= List of G.I. Joe video games =

G.I. Joe
- Genres: Side-scrolling; Third-person shooter
- Publishers: Parker Brothers; Konami; Backflip Studios; Epyx; Electronic Arts; Virgin Games; Taxan; Capcom; Paramount Digital Entertainment; DeNA; D3 Go! Maximum Games; GameMill Entertainment indie.io
- Platforms: Atari 2600, Commodore 64, Apple II, ZX Spectrum, Amstrad PCW, Nintendo Entertainment System, Arcade, PlayStation 2, Microsoft Windows, Nintendo DS, PlayStation Portable, PlayStation 3, Wii, Xbox 360, iOS, Android, Mobile Phone, Nintendo Switch, PlayStation 4, Xbox One, Macintosh, PlayStation 5, Xbox Series X
- First release: G.I. Joe: Cobra Strike; 1983
- Latest release: G.I. Joe: Wrath of Cobra; 2024

Throughout the existence of the G.I. Joe media franchise, there have been several video games released.

== List of G.I. Joe Games ==
Video game	Date	Platform(s)	Publisher(s)	Ref
G.I. Joe: Cobra Strike	1983	Atari 2600	Parker Brothers	
G.I. Joe: A Real American Hero	1985	Apple II, Commodore 64	Epyx	
Action Force: International Heroes	1987	ZX Spectrum, Commodore 64, Amstrad CPC	Virgin Games	
Action Force II: International Heroes	1988	ZX Spectrum	Virgin Games	
G.I. Joe	1991	Nintendo Entertainment System	Taxan	
G.I. Joe: The Atlantis Factor	1992	Nintendo Entertainment System	Capcom	
G.I. Joe	1992	Arcade	Konami	
G.I. Joe: The Rise of Cobra	2009	PlayStation 2, PlayStation 3, Wii, Xbox 360, mobile phone, Nintendo DS, PlayStation Portable	Electronic Arts	
G.I. Joe: The Rise of Cobra - Basic Training	2009	iOS	Paramount Digital Entertainment	
G.I. Joe: Battleground	2013	iOS, Android	DeNA	
G.I. Joe: Battleground	2013	iOS, Android	Backflip Studios	
G.I. Joe Strike	2015	Android	Backflip Studios	
G.I. Joe: War On Cobra	2020	iOS, Android	D3 Go!	
G.I. Joe: Operation Blackout	2020	Nintendo Switch, PlayStation 4, Xbox One, Microsoft Windows	NA: GameMill Entertainment; EU: Maximum Games	
G.I. Joe: Wrath of Cobra	2024	Nintendo Switch, Microsoft Windows, Arcade, Macintosh, PlayStation 5, Xbox Series X	indie.io, ExA-Arcadia	
