= Memories Off 6: T-wave =

2008 video game

- One of the two PlayStation 2 cover artworks.
- Developer: 5pb.
- Series: Memories Off
- Platforms: PlayStation 2, PlayStation 3, PlayStation Portable, PlayStation Vita, Xbox 360, iPhone, iPod Touch
- Release: PlayStation 2: JP: August 21, 2008; PlayStation Portable: JP: May 28, 2009; Xbox 360: JP: August 27, 2009; iPhone, iPod Touch: WW: November 4, 2010; PlayStation 3, PlayStation Vita: JP: June 27, 2013
- Genres: Drama, romance, visual novel
- Mode: Single-player

Memories Off 6: T-wave (メモリーズオフ シックス ～トライアングル・ウェーブ～, Memorīzu Ofu Shikkusu ~Toraianguru Uēbu~) is a Japanese romance visual novel developed by 5pb. originally released for the PlayStation 2 console on August 21, 2008. It was released for the Xbox 360 on August 27, 2009. This was the second game in the Memories Off series to be developed by 5pb. after exclusive development and distribution rights of the series was transferred over to 5pb. from Cyberfront. A manga adaptation of the game was published in the Comic Alive magazine in 2008.

A sequel named Memories Off 6: Next Relation was released for the PS2 and Xbox 360 in 2009. It was later ported to the PSP in 2010. A PlayStation Vita and PlayStation 3 port of both games are released on June 27, 2013.

== Characters ==
Shio Tsukamoto (塚本 志雄, Tsukamoto Shio)
Voiced by: Fujiwara Yuuki
The main male character of the game and the one who the player controls. He's the landlord of his own apartment building, making him the richest protagonist in the series. He also works in the student council, thanks to Ririsu. He also enjoys listening to radio, especially a radio show called T-Wave.
Ririsu Toomine (遠峯 りりす, Tōmine Ririsu)
Voiced by: Ayano Niina
A second year student at Sumisora High School. Ririsu is Shio's childhood friend and Chisa's best friend. She moved away for few years and when she came back to Sumisora her personality had changed dramatically.
Chisa Hakosaki (箱崎 智紗, Hakosaki Chisa)
Voiced by: Aya Hirano
A second year student at Sumisora High School. She has a crush on Shio, which she tells him about in the game's beginning.
Chloe Kagamigawa (嘉神川 クロエ, Kagamigawa Kuroe)
Voiced by: Yuko Goto
A third year student at Sumisora High School and the student council president. Her father is Japanese and her mother is French. She is the second heroine with mixed blood in Memories Off series (First one being Shion Futami from the first game).
Rein Suzushiro (鈴代 黎音, Suzushiro Rein)
Voiced by: Rie Tanaka
A 24-year-old woman who is a novelist. She's known for skipping deadlines, making her novels get delayed release.
Yuuno Kasuga (春日 結乃, Kasuga Yūno)
Voiced by: Ui Miyazaki
A first year transfer student at Sumisora High School.
Tooru Saga (佐賀 亭, Saga Tōru)
Voiced by: Kouta Nemoto
Shio's best friend, although he is often neglected. He claims that he likes Ririsu.
Shin Inaho (稲穂 信, Inaho Shin)
Voiced by: Junji Majima
The recurring character throughout the Memories Off series. He is the brother of a certain heroine.
KANATA
The DJ of the radio show that Shio listens to. Her real identity is Kanata Kurosu (黒須 カナタ, Kurosu Kanata) from Omoide ni Kanata Kimi: Memories Off. She does not make an actual appearance in the game.

== Development ==
The development and distribution of Memories Off 6: T-wave was handled completely by 5pb. Games. The character designers for the game are Takayuki Koshimizu and Yukihiro Matsuo, who also worked for the previous 3 games.

== Music ==
The music of Memories Off 6: T-wave is composed by Takeshi Abo. The opening theme, "Triangle Wave", will be performed by Ayumi Murata and the ending theme, "Perimeter" (プリミディア, Purimitea) will be performed by Ayane. Both theme songs were penned by Chiyomaru Shikura.
