= G.I. Joe (1991 video game) =

1991 video game

G.I. Joe: A Real American Hero
- Developer: KID
- Publisher: Taxan USA
- Directors: Motoyuki Inoue; Kuniharu Hosoda
- Producer: Ken Lobb
- Programmer: Shōji Takagi
- Artists: Abe; Kazuhiro Iizuka; Tsutomu Ozawa
- Composers: Nobuyuki Shioda; Yūsuke Takahama
- Series: G.I. Joe
- Platform: Nintendo Entertainment System
- Release: NA: January 1991
- Genres: Action, platform, run and gun
- Mode: Single player

G.I. Joe: A Real American Hero is a 1991 run and gun game published by Taxan for the Nintendo Entertainment System based on the toyline of the same name. The game was produced by Ken Lobb and developed by the same Japanese team that later formed KID. A sequel developed by the same team, titled G.I. Joe: The Atlantis Factor, was released the following year, but was published by Capcom after Taxan went out of business.

G.I. Joe on the NES garnered positive reception from reviewers since its initial release; praise was given to the colorful graphics, ability to choose between characters and form a team, soundtrack, controls, gameplay and music but the occasional flickering issues was criticized. Retrospective commentary has been positive.

== Gameplay ==
Gameplay screenshot of mission 1-1.

The player takes control of a team of three G.I. Joe characters, each with his own specialty. The goal of the game is to navigate through six stages on a mission to finally bring down Cobra. The initial character roster consists of Duke, Snake Eyes, Blizzard, Captain Grid-Iron, and Rock 'n Roll. A sixth character, Hawk, gives orders to the team between missions, and becomes available as a playable character for the final stage. The player's first character is automatically assigned depending on the stage, while the second and third characters are freely chosen.

The player collects power-ups in the game that increases an individual character's abilities. Gun icons increases firepower, K-rations recovers energy, and Chevron icons increases the current character's maximum stamina. Bullet icons refills the player's collective ammunition and bulletproof vest icons that grant temporary invincibility are also available at designated locations on each area. Icons flashing in red are more valuable than ordinary icons. All upgrades garnered during the course of the game are permanent, provided of course the character survives the mission.

Certain areas have empty enemy vehicles that the main character can operate. The three different vehicles available are the Buzz Boar, the Pogo, and the Battle Copter. The player can still plant bombs while riding these vehicles.

Each stage is broken up into three different segments: In the first segment, the player's team would fight their way into one of Cobra's bases. After penetrating the base, the player's team must plant a certain amount of bombs inside the base before time runs out. Afterward, the player must fight against the base's commander. The enemy bosses include a Range-Viper, Metal-Head, Overlord, Voltar, Destro and Cobra Commander himself. A password is given at the end of each stage.

There are five initial characters in the game (with a sixth character that becomes available for the final stage), each with his strength to bring to the game. The player can choose a team of three for each area. During gameplay, the player can switch between characters after pausing the game. The characters’ skills are agility, stamina, strength and firepower.

- Duke – The most balanced, possessing the mid-level skills and powers of his comrades. He leads the team in Amazon mission.
- Snake Eyes – Can jump higher and punch/throw faster than his teammates. He is also the only one who does not use up any ammunition, using white fireballs instead (described in game as a sort of Jujitsu). While being able to conserve vital ammunition, Snake Eyes' weapon is weak. He leads the team in New York's sewer mission.
- Capt. Grid-Iron – Has the greatest fist power and is average in other departments. He is very similar to Duke, but with a shorter jump and a smaller spread weapon (described as grenade launcher). He leads the team in Black Hills mission.
- Rock ‘n Roll – He has the strongest firepower (machine gun) and the widest range of all but all his other ratings below average. He leads the team in the desert mission.
- Blizzard - Sub-par in most skills except stamina. Blizzard may come in handy during the Antarctic world, but otherwise does not stand out in any specific areas, though his (grenade) throwing speed is almost as fast as Snake Eyes. His special ability is that he can shoot through solid walls. He is in charge on the Antarctica missile base mission.
- General Hawk – His appearance is based on the 1991 edition of his action figure. He is the only character who can fly and a requirement when facing Cobra Commander. He becomes available for use only in the final stage. In the course of the game, he was kidnapped by Destro, and Rock 'n Roll led a team of operatives to rescue him from the desert.

The six missions that the G.I. Joe team members must progress through each take place in a different part of the world: the Amazon, Antarctica, New York City, the Black Hills, and the Sahara. The game's final mission takes place in Cobra Headquarters.

== Reception ==
Reception

Review scores
Publication	Score
AllGame	3.5/5
Electronic Gaming Monthly	7/10, 8/10, 7/10, 8/10
GamePro	18/25
Nintendo Power	7.6/10
VideoGames & Computer Entertainment	7/10
Ação Games	100/100
VideoGame	7/10

G.I. Joe: A Real American Hero on the Nintendo Entertainment System received positive reception from critics. Electronic Gaming Monthly's four reviewers praised the colorful background visuals, ability to choose between characters and form a team, gameplay and music. GamePro's Mangoose noted the ability to switch between characters and commended the graphics, sound, gameplay, fun factor and challenge but nevertheless found the game to be average. Likewise, Nintendo Power gave positive remarks to the graphics, controls, challenge and thematic, stating that "Taxan has combined great control and graphics for a winner." VideoGames & Computer Entertainment's B.W. felt it was a good action title, giving positive commentary to the colorful graphics, smooth character animations, sound design and playability but criticized the occasional flickering. The Brazilian magazines Ação Games and VideoGame highly praised the audiovisual presentation and challenge for a licensed product.

Retrospective reviews for G.I. Joe on NES have been equally positive. AllGame's Skyler Miller remarked that the ability to switch between members at any time added an element of strategy into the game due to each character having their own statistics, while stating that both graphics and music were above average. HonestGamers' Julian Titus criticized its time-sensitive nature, due to timers being carried over to the next section of a stage and flickering issues. Regardless, Titus recommending the title and praised the detailed graphical presentation for being faithful to the franchise and core action. Hardcore Gaming 101's Sotenga felt it was more refined than Low G Man but not as fast-paced as other games such as Contra, criticizing the slow pacing of later stages as well as unavoidable boss patterns and character balancing. However, he commended the colorful visuals, detailed backgrounds, soundtrack and gameplay for being well-rounded, recommending it to those who are or not fans of the series.
