= Memories Off 5: Togireta Film =

Media franchise

- PlayStation 2 cover art
- Developers: KID, 5pb.
- Publishers: CyberFront, 5pb.
- Artists: Yukihiro Matsuo; Takayuki Koshimizu
- Composer: Takeshi Abo
- Series: Memories Off
- Platforms: PlayStation 2, PlayStation Portable, Windows
- Release: Memories Off 5: JP: October 27, 2005 (PS2); JP: January 29, 2009 (PSP); Memories Off 5 Encore: JP: July 12, 2007 (PS2); JP: September 17, 2009 (PSP)
- Genre: Visual novel
- Mode: Single-player

Memories Off 5: Togireta Film (メモリーズオフ #5 とぎれたフィルム, Memoriizu Obu #5 Togireta Firumu) is a Japanese romance visual novel developed by KID and published by CyberFront for the PlayStation 2 console. It was released on October 27, 2005, and is the fifth game in the Memories Off series. A port for the PlayStation Portable handheld developed and published by 5pb. was released on January 29, 2009. A sequel named Memories Off 5: Encore (メモリーズオフ #5 アンコール, Memoriizu Obu #5 Ankōru) was released for the PlayStation 2 on July 12, 2007. Its PlayStation Portable port was released on September 17, 2009. The gameplay of Memories Off 5 follows linear plot line, which offers different predetermined scenarios and events, and focuses on the appeal of the five female main characters.

The story of Memories Off 5 has been adapted into novels and a one-episode anime OVA has also been released. Memories Off 5: Encore has also been adapted into a novel.

== Gameplay ==
The gameplay of Memories Off 5 requires minimal interaction from the player as much of the time is spent in reading the text that appears in the bottom of the screen. The text that is displayed represents either the dialogue between the characters or the inner thoughts of the protagonist. Once in a while, the player will be presented will arrive at a "decision point". The game pauses at this point and lists some choices for the player to pick. Based on the choices that are selected, the plot will progress in a specific direction. There are five main plot lines in the game, each corresponding to one of the main female characters. The player will have to replay the game multiple times to experience all of the endings.

== Characters ==
The player takes on the role of Haruto Kawai (河合春人, Kawai Haruto; voiced by: Showtaro Morikubo), the protagonist of Memories Off 5. Haruto is a university student and a member of the Chihaya University Movie (CUM) society (Chihaya University Movie 研究会, Chihya University Movie Kenkyūkai). Yūsuke Hina (日名雄介, Hina Yūsuke; voiced by: Takahiro Sakurai) is a close friend of Haruto's. He was in the process of completing the planning for a film he thought of when he died in an accident one year prior to the events of the game. Mahiro Sendō (仙堂麻尋, Sendō Mahiro; voiced by: Nana Inoue) is an acquaintance of Yūsuke's and is at odds with Haruto and the other members of the CUM society as she claims to be responsible for Yūsuke's death. Asuka Hina (日名あすか, Hina Asuka; voiced by: Nogawa Sakura) is a senior high school student and the sister of Yūsuke.

Kazuki Mishima (観島香月, Mishima Kazuki; voiced by: Natsuko Kuwatani) is a friend of Haruto's and is a member of the CUM society. Shūji Ozu (小津修司, Ozu Shūji; voiced by: Daisuke Kishio) is another friend of Haruto's and is also a member of the CUM society. He has feelings for Asuka. Ayumu Kise (木瀬歩, Kise Ayumu; voiced by: Ryōko Shiraishi) is a new member of the CUM society and also a character from Memories Off: Sorekara, the previous game in the Memories Off series. Miumi Sawarabi (早蕨美海, Sawarabi Miumi; voiced by: Kaori Nazuka) is a cousin of Haruto's who also happens to be a classmate and close friend of Asuka's. Mizuho Amamiya (雨宮瑞穂, Amamiya Mizuho; voiced by: Rei Sakuma) is the manager of the fast food restaurant that Haruto and Asuka works at. Shin Inaho (稲穂信, Inaho Shin; voiced by: Junji Majima) is Haruto's neighbour.

== Development ==
The characters of Memories Off 5 were designed by Yukihiro Matsuo and Takayuki Koshimizu. The music was composed by Takeshi Abo.

=== Release history ===
Memories Off 5 was first released for the PlayStation 2 in regular and limited editions on October 27, 2005. The limited edition includes a special book and an original drama CD. The PlayStation Portable port of Memories Off 5 was released in both regular and limited editions on January 29, 2009. The limited edition included a soundtrack CD, a vocal CD containing character songs of the heroines and the opening and ending themes, an "AfterStory" novel, a book regarding the details of the game, and a DVD for the Memories Off 5 OVA animation. The "AfterStory" novel tells the story of the main characters between the events of Memories Off 5 and Memories Off 5: Encore.

== Memories Off 5: Encore ==
Memories Off 5: Encore is the sequel to Memories Off 5 and was released on July 12, 2007, for the PlayStation 2. The limited edition PlayStation 2 release included a soundtrack for the game. The scenarios for Encore were written by Masashi Takimoto, Naotaka Hayashi, and Haruhisa Kujira. The music for Encore was composed by Takeshi Abo who also composed the music for Memories Off 5. Encore, and 12Riven, another game that was under development by KID, was originally in danger of not being released after KID filed for bankruptcy in 2006. However, both games were resurrected after CyberFront purchased KID's intellectual properties in 2007.

The game was later ported to the PlayStation Portable and was released on September 17, 2009. For the PlayStation Portable's limited edition, a postcard set and a drama CD was included. The PlayStation Portable release of Encore includes screen capture feature that allows the player to save images onto a memory stick.

Encore introduces a new character named Akina Ichijō (一条 秋名, Ichijō Akina; voiced by: Minori Chihara). She comes in contact with the main characters after bumping into Kazuki Mishima at a video rental store. The character designs for Akina was done by Yukihiro Matsuo. Encore takes place in December, about half a year after the events of Memories Off 5, and ends in the following February. In this game, the player is able to experience the story from different perspectives besides that of Haruto Kawai. Encore also only focuses on three heroines whereas previous titles in the Memories Off series tended to feature four to six heroines.

== Adaptations ==
=== Books ===
A 128-page visual fan book of Memories Off 5 was published by Enterbrain on November 30, 2005, which included illustrations and information about the game's plot. Enterbrain also published two other novel adaptations, Memories Off 5: Togireta Film -distance- (メモリーズオフ#5 とぎれたフィルム -distance-, Memoriizu Obu #5 Togireta Firumu -distance-) and Memories Off 5: Togireta Film -last preview- (メモリーズオフ#5 とぎれたフィルム -last preview-, Memoriizu Obu #5 Togireta Firumu -last preview-), written by Chabō Higurashi. The novels were published on November 30, 2005, and December 24, 2005, respectively.

A visual fan book for Encore was published by Jive on September 1, 2007. The fan book includes art by Yukihiro Matsuo and Takayuki Koshimizu as well as interview with the development staff members. A novel was published on September 21, 2007.

=== Anime ===
- Memories Off #5 Togireta Film

Memories Off #5 とぎれたフィルム (Memorīzu Obu #5 Togireta Firumu)
- Original video animation
- Directed by: Tarou Iwasaki
- Produced by: Michiko Koyanagi
- Written by: Masashi Takimoto; Naotaka Hayashi
- Music by: Takeshi Abo
- Studio: Doga Kobo
- Released: March 29, 2006
- Runtime: 27 minutes

Memories Off 5 was adapted into a single anime OVA episode titled "Memories Off 5 the Animation", which aired on March 29, 2006.

== Music ==
Memories Off 5 has two main theme songs, the opening theme, "Orange" and the ending theme, "Romancing Story" (ロマンシングストーリー, Romanshingu Sutōrii). Both of the theme songs were sung by Ayane and written by Chiyomaru Shikura. The soundtrack for Memories Off 5 was released on November 10, 2005. Neal Chandran of RPGFan noted that while "[it is] nothing revolutionary for Takeshi Abo...", "[it] is definitely Takeshi Abo's strongest Memories Off soundtrack [based on what he has heard]".

The opening theme for Memories Off 5: Encore, "Kimi ga Ita Shōko" (キミが居た証拠に), like "Orange" from Memories Off 5, is performed by Ayane and written by Shikura. "Kimi ga Ita Shōko" was arranged by Toshimichi Isoe. The soundtrack for Encore was released on July 12, 2007, as a bonus item with the limited edition of the game. From the soundtrack, Patrick Gann of RPGFan felt the opening theme to be the weakest song in the collection.
