= Ken Lobb =

American video game designer

- Other names: KAL, K. Lobb, Ken Lobb
- Occupations: Video game designer, creative director, voice actor
- Years active: 1988–present

Kenneth Alan Lobb (also credited as Ken Lobb, KAL, and K. Lobb) is an American video game designer formerly employed by Taxan USA Corp., Namco Hometek, and Nintendo of America, and currently employed by Xbox Game Studios as Creative Director. He is best known as co-creator of the Killer Instinct series.

== Career ==
Lobb graduated from DeVry University in 1982 and attempted to secure a job in the video game industry unsuccessfully, blaming the video game crash of 1983. Lobb claimed that he applied to Atari Inc. around this time but never heard back. Lobb subsequently began working at AMD, specifically on programmable ROM.

Lobb was introduced to the management of Taxan USA via the owner of a video game store he frequented in Northern California. Lobb did not apply for a role with Taxan but instead had casual conversations with the company management about video games and this sparked their interest in hiring him, unbeknownst to Lobb until they invited him to play the newly released R-Type at their company office. Subsequently Lobb was employed as Product Manager of Taxan USA between October 1988 and January 1991, where he worked alongside Japanese developer KID on various NES games made for the U.S. market. After Taxan closed down in early 1991, Lobb was then employed by Namco Hometek until 1993, where he was Head of Product Development. The same year Lobb began working at Nintendo of America, where he worked on several games, including GoldenEye 007. While at Nintendo Lobb worked as Head of Game Development for Nintendo of America. Shortly after the resignation of Minoru Arakawa from Nintendo in January 2002, Lobb left to join Microsoft Game Studios. Lobb commented in a 2007 interview with IGN that had Arakawa not left the company he would have been less likely to leave.

A weapon in GoldenEye 007, the Klobb - aka the vz. 61 Škorpion - was named after him due to last-minute copyright issues, and became notorious amongst gamers for its lackluster abilities. Despite this, Lobb stated that it "ended up having a nice impact on me, personally".

== Works ==
Year	Title	Role	Platform	Developer
1990	Burai Fighter	Designer	NES	KID
1990	Low G Man	Designer	NES	KID
1990	G.I. Joe	Producer	NES	KID
1991	Rolling Thunder 2	Hometek Team	Sega Genesis	Namco
1992	G.I. Joe: The Atlantis Factor	Producer (uncredited)	NES	KID
1992	Kick Master	Producer	NES	KID
1992	Splatterhouse 2	Special Thanks	Sega Genesis	Now Production
1992	Wings 2: Aces High	Producer	SNES	Malibu Interactive
1992	Super Batter Up	Special Thanks	SNES	Namco
1993	Splatterhouse 3	Special Thanks	Sega Genesis	Now Production
1994	Super Punch-Out!!	Special Thanks	SNES	Nintendo
1994	Donkey Kong Country	Special Thanks	SNES	Nintendo
1994	Killer Instinct	Game design, character voices	Arcade	Rare
1996	Killer Instinct 2	Character voices, additional design, special thanks	Arcade	Rare
1996	Cruis'n USA	Special Thanks	N64	Williams
1996	Donkey Kong Country 3: Dixie Kong's Double Trouble!	Special Thanks	SNES	Rare
1997	Tetrisphere	Product coordinator	N64	H2O Entertainment
1997	Donkey Kong Land III	Special Thanks	Game Boy	Rare
1997	GoldenEye 007	NOA Treehouse Staff	N64	Rare
1997	Diddy Kong Racing	NOA Thanks To	N64	Rare
1997	Cruis'n World	NOA Producer	N64	Eurocom
1997	Blast Corps	NOA Staff	N64	Rare
1998	Banjo-Kazooie	NOA Big Thanks	N64	Rare
1999	Star Wars Episode I: Racer	Thanks to NOA	N64 Game Boy Color)	LucasArts
1999	R-Type DX	Special Thanks	Game Boy Color	Bits Studios
1999	The New Tetris	Special Thanks	N64	H2O Entertainment Blue Planet Software
1999	NBA 3 on 3 Featuring Kobe Bryant	Special Thanks	Game Boy Color	Left Field Productions
1999	Mickey's Racing Adventure	NOA Thanks	Game Boy Color	Rare
1999	Ken Griffey Jr.'s Slugfest	Special Thanks	N64 Game Boy Color	Angel Studios Software Creations
1999	Jet Force Gemini	NOA Thanks To	N64	Rare
1999	Duke Nukem: Zero Hour	Special Thanks	N64	Eurocom
1999	Donkey Kong 64	Special Thanks	N64	Rare
1999	Conker's Pocket Tales	NOA Special Thanks	Game Boy Color	Rare
1999	Command & Conquer	Executive producer	N64	Looking Glass Studios
2000	Perfect Dark	NOA Staff	N64	Rare
2000	Alice in Wonderland	NOA Special Thanks	Game Boy Color	Digital Eclipse Software
2003	Voodoo Vince	Special Thanks	Xbox	Beep Industries
2004	Fable: The Lost Chapters	Special Thanks	Xbox	Big Blue Box Studios
2007	Shadowrun	Special Thanks	Xbox 360	FASA Interactive
2010	Crackdown 2	Designer	Xbox 360	Ruffian Games
2013	Killer Instinct	Supervisor, voice of Chief Thunder	Xbox One	Double Helix Games
2015	Ori and the Blind Forest	Special Thanks	Xbox 360 Xbox One Windows	Moon Studios
2016	Quantum Break	Partner creative director	Xbox One Windows	Remedy Entertainment
