= MO5 =

MO5 may refer to:

- Memories Off 5 The Unfinished Film, a Japanese visual novel
- Thomson MO5, a home computer
- Former name used by MI5
