= Burai Fighter =

1990 video game

- Developer: KID
- Publishers: NES: NA: Taxan; JP: Taito; PAL: Nintendo; Game Boy: JP: Taito; NA: Taxan; EU: Nintendo; Game Boy Color: JP: KID; NA: Agetec
- Designer: Ken Lobb
- Composer: Norio Nakagata (uncredited)
- Platforms: Nintendo Entertainment System, Game Boy, Game Boy Color
- Release: NES: NA: March 1990; JP: July 20, 1990; PAL: 1990; Game Boy: JP: June 27, 1990; NA: January 1991; EU: 1991; Game Boy Color: JP: July 23, 1999; NA: August 28, 2000
- Genre: Shoot 'em ups
- Mode: Single-player

Burai Fighter (Note: Japanese: 無頼戦士(ブライ・ファイター), Hepburn: Burai Faitā) is a shoot 'em up video game developed by KID for the Nintendo Entertainment System. The game was released in North America by Taxan in March 1990, PAL regions by Nintendo in 1990, and Japan by Taito on July 20, 1990. The game was ported to the Game Boy and retitled as Burai Fighter Deluxe, and was released in Japan on June 27, 1990, in North America in January 1991 and in Europe in 1991; this port was released for the Game Boy Color as Space Marauder, originally released in Japan as Burai Fighter Color, as the original Game Boy version is not compatible with the later models.

The setting for Burai Fighter is to fend off seven bases of Burai, super-intelligent cyborgs. The player starts out with a relatively weak cannon, but can upgrade to ring, laser, and missile weapons, which are much more powerful. The player can initially choose from three difficulty settings: Eagle, Albatross, and Ace; the fourth difficulty setting, Ultimate, must be unlocked. The character can be moved in 8 directions and can shoot in a different direction from the direction he is moving towards.

== Gameplay ==
Gameplay screenshot of Stage 1

Burai Fighter is a single-player two-dimensional automatic sidescroller. It has three difficulty levels to choose from. At the start, the screen moves from left to right, but it can move in any cardinal direction and change directions in the same level. The player is expected to keep up, as getting stuck on the edge means the player character dies. The player starts out with a basic gun that can fire in all eight directions. Holding down the fire button locks the player's firing direction. The player floats through space to destroy robots. At the end of a level they must defeat a boss to continue to the next level. At times the player may find a gap at the side of the screen. When the player moves into the gap with correct timing, the orientation of the screen changes and takes them into a secret room with some power-ups. Higher difficulty levels have fewer secret rooms and more precise timing is required. The game is fairly linear, but there are some forks in the path where the player can either travel on the left side or the right side of the screen for a little while. Some sides are more challenging than their counterparts.

Each level has a password that can be input to start at that level.

== Plot ==
The Burai are an intelligent race bent on complete domination of the entire universe. They have seven facilities across the galaxy that produce their troops that are half-robot, half-animal. Only the unnamed protagonist can save the universe with his proton suit and laser gun.

== Release ==
Space Marauder (known as Burai Senshi Color in Japan) is a colorized version of the Game Boy version. It was developed and published by KID in Japan and Agetec in North America. It was released in Japan on July 23, 1999, and in North America on August 28, 2000. The game puts the player in the role an infantryman dropped into an alien base that is determined to enslave humanity. There are three different power-ups, and the game allows you to shoot in eight different directions. However, due to the difficulty of switching the direction of fire during the midst of battle, it is regarded to be easier to just shoot in one direction. The three power-ups are considered standard for the genre: a blue bullet, a lighter blue laser, and a pink laser. The game uses a password system to continue progress.

== Reception ==
Reviews (NES)

Review scores
Publication	Score
Aktueller Software Markt	10/12
Electronic Gaming Monthly	8/10, 7/10, 6/10, 7/10
Famitsu	22/40
Joystick	88%
Player One	88%
Total!	77%
Video Games (DE)	66%
VideoGames & Computer Entertainment	5/10
Mean Machines	79%
Micro News	3/5

Burai Fighter received a mixture of opinions from reviewers on the Nintendo Entertainment System, though a slight majority gave it a positive recommendation. Electronic Gaming Monthly's four reviewers compared it with Section Z, describing it as a cross between Forgotten Worlds and Side Arms. They stated that the power-up build-up system was a welcomed change of pace and praised its frantic action, varied background graphics and smooth scrolling, regarding it as one of the better shooters for NES. VideoGames & Computer Entertainment's B.W. felt that its visuals were adequate but did not help to convey an appropriate atmosphere. He commended the smooth scrolling but criticized the amount of flickering when too many enemies are present on-screen, as well as the sound design and lack of replay value after completing the game. Mean Machines' Matt Regan and Julian Rignall criticized its presentation and sound, while both critics felt divided in regards to its challenge and difficulty. However, they gave positive remarks to the graphics, playability and longevity, with Rignall regarding it as a welcomed addition to the NES library. Joystick's Sébastien Hamon gave positive commentary in regards to the audiovisual presentation, sprite animations, controls and precise action.

Micro News' Sylvain Allain commended its graphics and sprite animations but criticized the sound. Player One's Cyril Drevet praised the animated visuals, sound, varied difficulty, longevity and fun factor. Aktueller Software Markt's Michael Suck stated that "Burai Fighter shines with high playability and variable, always surprising gameplay." Suck also gave positive remarks to the graphics but criticized its sound design. Video Games' Andreas Knauf noted its high difficulty level, changing view perspectives and technical accomplishment. However, like B.W., Knauf criticized the amount of flickering and visuals due to the large sprites.

=== Deluxe ===
Reviews (Deluxe)

Review scores
Publication	Score
ACE	781/1000
Aktueller Software Markt	11/12
Consoles +	90%
Electronic Gaming Monthly	27/40
Joystick	85%
Player One	85%
Raze	84/100
Tilt	17/20
Ação Games	100/100
Mean Machines	83%
Power Play	63%

The Game Boy version, titled Burai Fighter Deluxe, received mostly positive reception from critics. Martin Gaksch of Power Play and Video Games criticized its audiovisual presentation but commended its original level design and password system. However, Gaksch ultimately felt that Deluxe could not compete with R-Type. Joystick's Jean-Marc Demoly drew comparison with the Commodore 64 shooter Dropzone due to its gameplay. Regardless, Demoly praised the Game Boy release for its graphics, sprite animations, sound and controls. Player One's Cyril Drevet gave positive remarks to the Deluxe release when it came to visuals, sound, longevity and fun factor, stating that "While waiting for better (Nemesis) [...], it will satisfy fans of the genre." Electronic Gaming Monthly's four reviewers felt that the Game Boy conversion was as intense as the NES original, giving positive commentary to its design, lack of screen blurring, challenge and weapon system. Similar to EGM's review of the NES original, Mean Machines' Matt Regan and Julian Rignall compared it with Forgotten Worlds. Nevertheless, both Regan and Rignall praised the Game Boy release for its presentation, graphics, playability and longevity but they felt mixed in regards to the sound.

Aktueller Software Markt's Hans-Joachim Amann commended Burai Fighter Deluxe for its graphics, smooth scrolling, password system and varied difficulty levels, but noted that the controls take time getting used to. The Brazilian magazines Ação Games called it "an excellent adaptation of the game", commending its audiovisual presentation and challenge. ACE's Rik Haynes gave positive remarks to the backgrounds and boss sprites, but criticized the Game Boy version for its small sprite size, sound design and overall longevity, recommending R-Type instead. Consoles +' Robinton felt mixed in regards to the presentation, but gave the conversion positive commentary when it came to visuals, sound, playability and longevity, regarding it as one of the best shooters on Game Boy. Likewise, Raze's Les Ellis regarded Deluxe as a "damn fine game" and one of the best shoot-'em-ups on Game Boy, due to the multi-directional scrolling, frenetic gameplay, graphics and music, but criticized its sound effects for being grating. Tilt's Jacques Harbonn called Burai Fighter the best shoot-'em-up on Game Boy.

=== Space Marauder ===
The Game Boy Color version, titled Space Marauder, received marginally positive reviews from critics. Nintendo Power felt mixed in regards to its dated graphics and game design but commended the responsive controls and fast-paced music. Marc Nix of IGN, the only other major critical site to review the game, noted its old school factor and compared it to NES and SNES era shooter games such as Space Megaforce, complimenting the usage of a genre that had been long dead.
