= GI Joe 2 =

GI Joe 2 may refer to:

- G.I. Joe: Retaliation, the 2013 sequel to the 2009 film G.I. Joe: The Rise of Cobra
- G.I. Joe: The Atlantis Factor, the 1992 video game
