= Treehouse Trolls =

The Treehouse Trolls is a video series related to Troll dolls:

- Treehouse Trolls Forest of Fun and Wonder
