= Memories Off 3.5 =

2004 original video animation

メモリーズオフ (Memorīzu Obu Furi Po'intu Fibu)
- Original video animation
- Directed by: Toshikatsu Tokoro
- Produced by: Chiyomaru Shikura; Takashi Saiki
- Written by: Chabou Higurashi
- Music by: Ryou Sakai
- Studio: Picture Magic; Rikuentai
- Released: May 12, 2004 – October 20, 2004
- Episodes: 4

Memories Off 3.5 is a double OVA series based on the third and fourth games of the Memories Off series: Omoide ni Kanata Kimi: Memories Off and Memories Off: Sorekara. The first two episodes centre on the events of Omoide ni Kanata Kimi: Memories Off, while the second season was best

episodes centre on Memories Off: Sorekara.1

== Memories Off 3.5: Omoide no Kanata e ==
The story takes place shortly after Omoide ni Kanata Kimi: Memories Off ended, where Cubic Cafe's manager dies in an accident while on a date with Kanata.

== Memories Off 3.5: Inori no Todoku Toki ==
The OVA takes place shortly before the Story of Memories Off: Sorekara, where Inori has flashbacks on how she met Isshu.

== Characters ==
=== Omoide no Kanata e ===
Shougo

Neo Kashima (Neo Kashima)

Kanata Kurosu (黒須 カナタ, Kurosu Kanata)

Tifu Kashima (Kashima Tifu)

Hibiki Kodama (Kodama Hibiki)

Tamaki Momose (Momose Tamaki)

Hotaru Shirakawa (白河 ほたる, Shirakawa Hotaru)

Shizuru Shirakawa (白河 静流, Shirakawa Shizuru)

Yue Imasaka (今坂 唯笑, Imasaka Yue)

Shin Inaho (稲穂 信, Inaho Shin)

Maguro

Tanaka

=== Inori no Todoku Toki ===
Isshu Sagisawa (Sagisawa Isshu)

Inori Misasagi (陵 いのり, Misasagi Inori)

Yukari Sagisawa (鷺沢 縁, Sagisawa Yukari)

Miyabi Fujiwara (藤原 雅, Fujiwara Miyabi)

Karin Hanamatsuri (花祭 果凛, Hanamatsuri Karin)

Nonohara Haya (野乃原 葉夜, Haya Nonohara)

Sayori Rikimaru (力丸 紗代里, Rikimaru Sayori)

Shizuru Shirakawa (白河 静流, Shirakawa Shizuru)

Hotaru Shirakawa (白河 ほたる, Shirakawa Hotaru)

Shin Inaho (稲穂 信, Inaho Shin)

Ken Inami (伊波 健, Inami Ken)

== Episodes ==
No.	Title	Original release date
1	"To the other side of the memories 1" "Omoide no Kanata e 1"	May 12, 2004
Kanata returns home in time for Tanaka's birthday, but her sudden appearance leads to problems between Shougo and Neo. After waiting for two hours for Tanaka to show up at his birthday party, the group learn that he and Kanata were involved in an accident...
2	"To the other side of the memories 2" "Omoide no Kanata e 2"	2004
Everyone is having a hard time after Tanaka's death. Neo worries that Shougo might choose Kanata over her, but is persuaded to keep fighting by Tifu, as Shougo is given advice from Yue. At Christmas, Shougo makes his true feelings known, and Kanata departs for America.
3	"The time when prayers are answered 1" "Inori no Todoku Toki 1"	2004
Inori invites Isshu to the upcoming festival so they can watch the fireworks together, but he declines due to work. She attends the festival alone and goes to the church, reminiscing about their relationship.
4	"The time when prayers are answered 2" "Inori no Todoku Toki 2"	2004
Inori continues to reminisce about her and Isshu's relationship, worrying that he doesn't truly love her. After Nonohara and Shizuru persuade him to go to her, Isshu and Inori watch the fireworks together.

== Music ==
The OVA used two theme songs: the opening is "Dry Words, Dry Maker" by Masumi Asano and the ending is "Shining Star" by Ayumi Murata.
