= Isolated Warrior =

1991 video game

- Developer: KID
- Publishers: JP: VAP; NA: NTVIC; EU: Nintendo
- Producers: Haruo Okamoto; Yuji Imazeki
- Designer: G. Baba
- Programmer: Shōji Takagi
- Composers: Nobuyuki Shioda; Norio Nakagata; Ryota Musha
- Platform: Nintendo Entertainment System
- Release: JP: February 15, 1991; NA: February 1991; EU: 1991
- Genres: Action, scrolling shooter
- Mode: Single-player

Isolated Warrior (Note: Also known as Max Warrior: Wakusei Kaigenrei (Japanese: マックスウォーリアー 惑星戒厳令, Hepburn: Makkusu Uōriā: Wakusei Kaigenrei; lit "Max Warrior: Martial Law Planet") in Japan.) is a 1991 video game developed by KID and published in Japan by VAP, in North America by NTVIC, and Europe by Nintendo.

Isolated Warrior received mostly positive reception from critics since its initial release; some drew comparison with Zaxxon due to the use of isometric projection, with praise being given to aspects such as the presentation, visuals and frenetic action, but other felt mixed in regards to the sound, difficulty and replay value, while common complaints were geared towards the amount of flickering that occurs when too many objects are present on-screen. Retrospective commentary has been mixed.

== Gameplay ==
Gameplay screenshot of level 1

The game is from an overhead oblique perspective. The player must collect weapon upgrades and operate various machines to combat the alien enemies.

Various obstacles, such as pitfalls and land mines, must be avoided. There is a boss battle at the end of each level, and sometimes mid-level as well. The player's progress in the game can be saved using a password system. Between some levels, images and text are displayed revealing Maverick's thoughts or reminiscence about his life.

== Plot ==
The game's plot takes place on a planet outside of Earth's galaxy called "Pan," which is suddenly attacked by a mysterious alien force.

The aliens have the unique power to consume any living thing, as well as machines and buildings. Pan soon becomes overtaken by the alien force, and the army of Pan begins to succumb to the onslaught. The soldiers and people of Pan are told to evacuate the planet. However, a captain of the army, Max Maverick, refuses to leave. He instead suits up for battle and faces the aliens alone, using a motorcycle and hovercraft as his means of transportation. Max must stop the alien menace or face the destruction of his world.

== Reception ==
Reception

Review scores
Publication	Score
AllGame	3.5/5
Electronic Gaming Monthly	26/40
Famitsu	21/40
Joypad	92%
Joystick	87%
Nintendo Power	6.6/10
Player One	56%
Total!	72%
Mean Machines	80%
Super Gamer	37%
VideoGame	4/5

Isolated Warrior received mostly positive reception from critics. Famitsu's four reviewers stated that the game felt similar to both Zaxxon and Solstice due to the pseudo 3D perspective and found it initially difficult to play because of this. Electronic Gaming Monthly's four reviewers commended the gameplay execution, graphics and music but criticized the amount of flickering that occurs when too many objects are present on-screen. Nintendo Power stated that the title's diagonal-based character action was well executed. Brazilian magazine VideoGame highly praised its audiovisual presentation and difficulty. Mean Machines's Richard Leadbetter and Julian Rignall disagreed with VideoGame's opinion when it came to the difficulty level, which they felt it was easy and lowered its replay value for more experienced players. However, both Leadbetter and Rignall regarded it to be an entertaining shooter for the NES, giving positive comments to the presentation, varied visuals, sound and addictive gameplay.

As with Famitsu, Joypad's Alain Huyghues-Lacour and Sébastien Hamon noted that Isolated Warrior was similar to Zaxxon due to the pseudo 3D graphical perspective. Both Huyghues-Lacour and Hamon praised its visuals, sprite animations, frenetic action, controls and audio. In contrast, Joystick's Jean-François Morisse felt more mixed towards the audiovisual presentation and controls but nevertheless gave the title a positive recommendation. Similarly, Player One's Cyril Drevet gave positive remarks to the isometric graphics, sprite animations, sound and difficulty but he felt mixed in regards to the longevity and overall gameplay. Total!'s Andy Dyer highly commended the graphics due to their hand drawn alien-esque presentation and visual effects, use of a password system, replayability and frantic gameplay. However, Dyer criticized said gameplay for being repetitive due to the long levels, odd soundtrack and flickering.

Retrospective reviews have been mixed, though most gave it a recommendation. AllGame's Brett Alan Weiss criticized the game's two technical shortcomings (flickering and slowdown), but commended the visual presentation for the character designs as well as the colorful and detailed environments. However, Weiss remarked that the game was "rather ordinary" besides its isometric perspective. Hardcore Gaming 101's Michael Plasket noted that the title was the only isometric shooter on NES but criticized its difficult fourth stage, imprecise hit detection due to the viewing perspective and requirement to reach the true final stage.
