= Mappy-Land =

1986 video game

- North American box art
- Developer: Tose
- Publishers: JP: Namco; NA: Taxan
- Series: Mappy
- Platform: Nintendo Entertainment System
- Release: JP: November 27, 1986; NA: April 1989
- Genre: Platform
- Mode: Single-player

Mappy-Land (Note: Japanese: マッピーランド, Hepburn: Mappī Rando) is a platform game developed by Tose and published by Namco for the Nintendo Entertainment System. It is a sequel to Namco's 1983 arcade video game Mappy. Originally released in 1986, it was released by Taxan in North America in 1989.

== Storyline ==
Mappy must travel through various themed areas, collecting six target items in each one, while attempting to avoid Goro and his gang of Meowkies. The target items differ depending on the story:

- Story 1: It is Mapico's birthday, and the task is to collect cheese as her present.
- Story 2: Mappy wishes to marry Mapico, and must collect wedding rings.
- Story 3: Mappy and Mapico are having a Christmas party, and Christmas trees must be collected.
- Story 4: It is Mappy Jr.'s birthday, and the task is to collect baseballs for his present.

After completing Story 4, it loops back to the first story.

There are eight areas with various unique features, and Goro wears costumes corresponding to each theme:

1. Railroad Town
2. Western World
3. Tropical World
4. Jungle World
5. Pirate World
6. Ghost Town
7. Seventh Avenue
8. Milky Town

== Gameplay ==
The gameplay is similar to the original Mappy, where the player must collect items and avoid enemies with the assistance of trampolines that will break if jumped on too many times before landing (Jungle World being the one exception to this). The player is a mouse, and the main items to collect are presents. The mouse must at all times avoid the deadly cats. Unlike the original, the doors and Microwave Doors are not present, and instead stage specific counterattack items can be used. Mappy can perform a short jump to trigger these items as well as collect the target items; he can also jump over the Meowkies if timed well. In addition, Mappy can carry a number of distraction items (up to 15) to temporarily stop enemies from pursuing:

- Cat Toys - Meowkies will dance around these, and the players can harmlessly pass them by. Goro will not be affected.
- Gold Coin - Goro will dance around this and not harm Mappy. Meowkies will not be affected.
- Silver Vine Pots - Meowkies will lose consciousness. Goro will not be affected.
- Fish - this will bounce forward in the direction Mappy's face. Both Goro and the Meowkies will chase it.

In the Ghost Town, Mappy will use a flashlight to ward off the ghosts, and can travel the stage with a balloon.

In order to finish a stage, the player must collect all six target items and then proceed to the exit on the right. Sometimes in certain stories, it is necessary to locate a subarea to obtain a special item before exiting. If it takes too long to finish an area, a warning chime will sound and the music will speed up, and eventually a Goro Coin will chase Mappy as well, which cannot be attacked or distracted.

- In the Ghost Town, sometimes the subarea where the player must enter is reminiscent of the original Mappy game, complete with its theme music playing, but there is only a doorway that leads to the next area, while all others warp the player to a different doorway instead.

Once reaching the last area (Milky Town) and collecting all the items, they must enter the castle and play an extra area; the six target items within must be collected and brought to Mapico or Mappy Jr. before the music ends. Failing to do this, the players must retry the extra area until they are successful. When successful, bonus points are awarded and the game starts the next story in the first area. Later stories alter the stage layouts and the enemies become much faster.

In some areas a bonus subarea can be found. These bonus subareas can reward with additional distraction items and extra lives. In order to access these, Mappy must be carrying no distraction items and must jump on a particular trampoline without any controller input; if successful, Mappy will then be sent upwards to the bonus subarea.

== Release ==
Mappy-Land was released in Japan on November 27, 1986. Taxan presented Mappy-Land at the Winter Consumer Electronic Show (CES) along with Mystery Quest (1987) and Fist of the North Star (1987). It was released in the United States in April 1989. Ed Harris of Electronic Gaming Monthly critiqued the marketing of the game, saying that the game looks like its for small children, but won't be fully appreciated by players under the age of 16.

Mappy-Land was released on the Wii U Virtual Console worldwide in February 2015, and on the Nintendo Classics service in March 2022. It was also included in the compilation Namco Museum Archives Vol. 2.

== Reception ==
Reception

Review scores
| Publication | Score |
|---|---|
| AllGame | 2/5 |
| Electronic Gaming Monthly | 7/10, 4/10, 6/10, 6/10 |
| Nintendo Life | 6/10 |

From contemporary reviews, the four reviewers in Electronic Gaming Monthly found the game appealing for different reasons. One said the game isn't revolutionary, but better than most, and was loaded with content to discover. One found it positively addictive and appropriately challenging. A third said the game starts out slow, but its graphics and other features brought it all together appropriately.

From retrospective reviews, Skyler Miller of Allgame said that fans of the original arcade game Mappy would feel at home with Mappy-Land but said that the flat and simple visuals, which would have looked dated by the American release of the game, would hurt the overall appeal of the game.
