= Memories Off: Sorekara =

Japanese visual novel

- Cover art for the PlayStation 2 version.

メモリーズオフ ~それから~ (Memorīzu Obu ~Sorekara~)
- Genre: Drama, romance
- Video game
- Developer: KID
- Genre: Visual novel
- Platform: PlayStation 2, Windows, PlayStation Portable
- Released: June 24, 2004 (PS2) October 14, 2004 (Windows) August 13, 2008 (PSP)
- Related works
- Memories Off 3.5: Inori no Todoku Toki OVA

Memories Off: Sorekara (メモリーズオフ ~それから~, lit. Memories Off: And Then) is a Japanese romance visual novel developed by KID for Windows and the PlayStation 2. It is the fourth game in the Memories Off series. The game was released for the PlayStation 2 on June 24, 2004. It was adapted into the second tale of an OVA series, titled as "Memories Off 3.5: Inori no Todoku Toki". A sequel to the game later followed titled Memories Off: Sorekara Again (メモリーズオフ ~それから again~) which was released on March 21, 2006. It was later ported to the PSP.

== Characters ==
Isshu Sagisawa (鷺沢一蹴, Sagisawa Isshu)
Voiced by: Daisuke Ono (OVA)
The main male character and the one the player takes the role of. He lives alone in an apartment and doesn't worry much about school. His girlfriend is Inori, but she dumps him at the beginning of the game. He works in a cafe called Narazuya (ならずや) and is a co-worker of Haya.

Inori Misasagi (陵 いのり, Misasagi Inori)
Voiced by: Sanae Kobayashi
The main female character and the one with the true ending, Inori is a sweet girl that likes cooking and playing the piano. She is the girlfriend of Isshu, but at the beginning of the game she dumps him. She met Isshu once when she was little but it seems that Isshu cannot remember it.

Yukari Sagisawa (鷺沢 縁, Sagisawa Yukari)
Voiced by: Eriko Ishihara
Voiced by: Sayaka Narita (Sorekara Again)
Isshu's non-blood related sister, as Isshu was adopted. She loves animals and likes cooking, even if she's a disaster at it.

Miyabi Fujiwara (藤原 雅, Fujiwara Miyabi)
Voiced by: Yumi Kakazu
One of the most famous girls at the school, Miyabi is very intelligent and beautiful. She loves sweets and becomes childish when you know her better, even that in the outside she looks cold. She's in the same Naginata club as Ayumu.

Karin Hanamatsuri (花祭 果凛, Hanamatsuri Karin)
Voiced by: Atsuko Enomoto
A popular model and idol who often visits the cafe Isshu and Haya work at. She acts like a rich lady in front of her fans, but she actually loves jokes and is very mature. Her nickname is Rikarin (りかりん) and she uses that name (in romaji) at work.

Haya Nonohara (野乃原 葉夜, Nonohara Haya)
Voiced by: Kimiko Koyama
An airhead who works in the same cafe as Isshu. She refers herself in third person with the name Non (のん). She is the best friend of Karin and Kanata and loves keeping secrets.

Sayori Rikimaru (力丸 紗代里, Rikimaru Sayori)
Voiced by: Yumiko Kobayashi
An underclassman of Isshu that is in love with Shin and admires Miyabi. She introduces herself as Sayorin (さよりん) because she doesn't like her last name. Although she does not reveal her real name in the game, it is strongly hinted what her last name is.

Ayumu Kise (木瀬 歩, Kise Ayumu)
Voiced by: Ryoko Shiraishi
A member of Naginata club. She speaks in Kansai dialect. She has a one-sided rivalry with Miyabi.

Shizuru Shirakawa (白河 静流, Shirakawa Shizuru)
Voiced by: Chiyomaru Shikura
Acting manager of Narazuya, and Hotaru's older sister.

Hotaru Shirakawa (白河 ほたる, Shirakawa Hotaru)
Voiced by: Chiyomaru Shikura
Main heroine of Memories Off 2nd. She's Inori's piano tutor, and helps Inori with her feelings.

Kanata Kurosu (黒須 カナタ, Kurosu Kanata)
Voiced by: Ayumi Murata
Main heroine of Omoide ni Kanata Kimi: Memories Off. She's good friends with Karin and Haya, and often visits Narazuya as well. She's also a model like Karin, and uses the name KANATA at work.

Shin Inaho (稲穂 信, Inaho Shin)
The recurring character throughout the Memories Off series. He lives in the same apartment building as Isshu.

Tobira Hida (飛田 扉, Hida Tobira)
Voiced by: Chiyomaru Shikura
Recurring character from Omoide ni Kanata Kimi: Memories Off. He used to live in the same orphanage as Isshu.

== Media ==
=== Anime ===
Memories Off ~And then~ was adapted into half of an OVA series, titled as "Memories Off 3.5: Inori no Todoku Toki".

=== Music ===
The opening for all the versions of the game except the PSP port is Soredemo Kimi wo Omoidasu Kara by Nana Mizuki. The opening for Sorekara Again is Drawing Again by Ayumi Murata. The opening for the PSP port is Kimi no Kakera sung by Ayane. This song is also used as the opening for the Omoide ni Kanata Kimi: Memories Off PSP port.
