= Serpent (video game) =

1990 video game

- Cover art
- Developer: Dual
- Publishers: JP: Naxat Soft; US: Taxan
- Platform: Game Boy
- Release: JP: April 6, 1990; NA: November 1990
- Genre: Snake
- Modes: Single-player, multiplayer

Serpent (Note: Japanese: かこむん蛇, Hepburn: Kakomunja) is a snake video game developed by Dual and published by Naxat Soft in Japan and by Taxan in North America for the Game Boy. It was released in 1990 in North America and Japan.

== Gameplay ==
When a snake cannot move, it self-destructs, and the surviving snake wins.

In the future, there is a sport called Serpent. Two fighters in serpentine robotic machines try to box each other in to win the fight. The serpents are detailed in the fact that they aren't just a line, giving a greater sense of realism to the game. Each snake has a fixed number of lives; with losing a life being a representation of "losing the war." The "game over" message is a simple message saying "the bitter taste of defeat" with an animated picture of a snake crying and accompanied by a melancholic music in a waltz rhythm.

There are two modes with four difficulty levels; level 1 is considered to be the easiest (normal speed and enemy performance) while level 4 is the hardest (fast speed and enemies are likely to cheat death). The first mode allows players to simply compete against an opponent while the second mode brings in a series of small snakes that emerge when players take too long conquering a level. Missiles can be launched when the player collects them on the field. White numbers help the player develop a longer body while black numbers make the body shorter.

Missiles can either make the enemy faster (black missiles) or slower (white missiles). Winning 7 of the 13 possible matches automatically makes the player into the "champion of serpents."

== Development and release ==
Serpent was developed by Dual and published by Taxan in the United States. It was released for the Game Boy in Japan on April 6, 1990. It was released for the American market in November 1990.

== Release and reception ==
Reception

Review scores
Publication	Score
Aktueller Software Markt	6/12
Famicom Hisshoubon	2/5
Famicom Tsūshin	5/10, 6/10, 6/10, 4/10
Power Play	43%

In Famicom Tsūshin, the four reviewers commented on the game. Two found it similar to earlier title such as Snake Byte (1982) and Taito's Replicart (1987). Martin Gaksch of Power Play also commented on its similarity to earlier titles, summarizing that "No idea is too old for a Game Boy port." The reviewers in Famicom Tsūshin 'generally found the game not very exciting as a single-player game, but grew more fun when played in the two-player mode. Sandra Alter of Aktueller Software Markt made similar comments that the game quickly grew dull as a single player game and only maintained interest as a two-player title.

A number of reviewers reviewers found the controls clunky or hard to get a hold of. Alter found the graphics lacking innovation and that the gameplay changes as the game went on were too minute. Gaksch echoed that the items somewhat liven up the gameplay, summarizing that it was not a bad game, just far too expensive for what it offered players.

== See also ==
- List of Game Boy games
