= Mystery Quest (video game) =

1987 video game

- North American version cover art
- Developer: Carry Lab
- Publishers: JP: Square; NA: Taxan
- Platforms: Family Computer Disk System, Nintendo Entertainment System
- Release: Family Computer Disk System: JP: May 1, 1987; Nintendo Entertainment System: NA: April 1989
- Genre: Platform
- Mode: Single-player

Mystery Quest (Note: Japanese: ハオ君の不思議な旅, Hepburn: Hao-kun no Fushigi na Tabi; lit. Hao's Mysterious Journey) is a platform game developed by Carry Lab. It was published in Japan by Square in 1987, and in North America by Taxan in 1989. The game follows the journey of Hao on his quest to become a wizard.

== Development and release ==
Mystery Quest was developed by Carry Lab Co. The game was part of Disk Original Group (DOG), which was established in July 1986 to pool financial resources for the seven then-fledgling companies to develop independently for the Famicom.

It was released in Japan by Square for the Family Computer Disk System on May 1, 1987.

Taxan presented Mystery Quest at the Winter Consumer Electronic Show (CES) along with Mappy-Land (1986) and Fist of the North Star (1987). It was set for release an early 1989 in the United States, and was released in April 1989.

== Reception ==
Reception

Review scores
Publication	Score
AllGame	1.5/5 (NES)
Famicom Tsūshin	4/10, 7/10, 8/10, 6/10 (FDS)

In Famicom Tsūshin the four reviewers were split on their opinion on the game. Two reviewers complimented as being fun with one saying it was similar to Super Mario Bros. (1985) while another said it appeared like an ordinary game at first, but you get more drawn in as you progress. The other two reviewers found the game lacking any unique features to make it stand-out. In the German video game magazine Joystick earned their middle-ground ranking of "OK", saying that the graphics and sound were not outstanding, but the game remained fun.

In a retrospective review, Skyler Miller of Allgame dismissed Mystery Quest as a "lifeless platformer" that had cute graphics but had "seemingly endless levels" and had graphics that would appear date by 1989.
