= Doki! Doki! Yūenchi: Crazy Land Daisakusen =

1991 video game

- Japanese cover art
- Developer: KID
- Publishers: JP: VAP; EU: American Softworks
- Designer: Kuniharu Hosoda
- Programmer: Norihisa Kawamoto
- Artist: Masao Kawai
- Composer: Nobuyuki Shioda
- Platform: Nintendo Entertainment System
- Release: JP: August 9, 1991; EU: 1993
- Genre: Action
- Mode: Single-player

Doki! Doki! Yūenchi: Crazy Land Daisakusen (ドキ!ドキ! 遊園地 クレイジーランド大作戦, Thrilling Amusement Park: Mission to Crazy Land) is a Nintendo Family Computer video game developed by KID and first released in 1991 by VAP. Its later European release for the Nintendo Entertainment System was called The Trolls in Crazyland, with its graphics and story adapted to feature the Troll doll characters, which were a very popular toy at that time.

The Japanese term Doki! Doki! (ドキ!ドキ!) is onomatopoeia for a beating heart, as a common expression referring to excitement.

== Gameplay ==
Gameplay screenshot.

Players control a boy with a helmet who kicks balls at enemies in an attempt to save his girlfriend from an unknown force inside an amusement park. The more damage he takes the more damage he does to enemies.

== Release ==
The game was scheduled for a North American release under the title Crazyland! The Ride Of Your Life!, however the publisher NTVIC cancelled it. Before the game's US release was cancelled, it was featured in the "Pak Watch" section of Nintendo Power Magazine, issue 29 (October 1991). The game was renamed The Trolls in Crazyland for release on the NES by American Softworks. It was to be released as Crazyland, but a change was made to feature the popular Troll dolls. That version was only released in Italy (PAL-A) and Western Europe (PAL-B).

== Reception ==
Reception

Review scores
Publication	Score
Famitsu	21/40
Total!	4+ (D+)
Video Games (DE)	68%
Hippon Super!	4/10

Doki! Doki! Yūenchi: Crazy Land Daisakusen was met with mixed reception from critics since its release. Public reception was also mixed; in a poll taken by Family Computer Magazine, Japanese readers voted to give the game a 19.2 out of 30 score, indicating a mixed following.
