= Ski Air Mix =

1998 video game

- Japanese box art
- Developer(s): KID
- Publisher(s): JP: KID; PAL: Midas Interactive Entertainment
- Platform(s): PlayStation
- Release: JP: July 23, 1998; EU: September 1, 2000
- Genre(s): Sports
- Mode(s): Single-player, multiplayer

Ski Air Mix (スキーエルーミックス) is an alpine skiing video game released on the PlayStation that was developed and published by KID in Japan. It was published by Midas Interactive Entertainment in Europe two years later and sold as a "budget" title.

== Gameplay ==
Typical view. Skier's speed and altitude are shown along with player's air points, personal records and time left.

The player takes control of one of four different skier models. Two male and two female models are available. Each model can be equipped with one of 11 different pairs of skis, each with their own statistics including Max Speed, Performance, Stability and Response. Then the player can ski on five different international slopes which include Italy, Austria, Japan, Switzerland and Canada in order of increasing difficulty. The game offers two modes, Alpen mode, which is single player and has the player racing against the clock, and Versus mode, which allows two players to compete on the same slope.

During a game, the player races downhill to the finish line before the clock runs out. Along the way there are jump points where the skier can pull off stunts and moves in mid-air, which grants the player Air Points upon successfully landing. Winding paths, gaps and slopes of varying steepness provide a constant challenge to the skiers as they travel to the finish line. Each slope is divided into three sectors, and each one is timed differently with different counters for Air Points.

The player wins a game by reaching the finish line before time runs out. Upon finishing a slope, the player has the option to view a replay of the run and then reaches a Results screen, which reports the time taken to complete each sector of the slope along with how many Air Points were attained in each one with a total. The player is then brought to a rankings screen which shows the best runs of the slope the player originally picked to play on. An option is also given to save a ghost replay of the run or, in case one already exists, to update it.

Reception

Review score
Publication	Score
PlayStation: The Official Magazine	1/10
