= Mayuko Takata =

Japanese actress (born 1971)

Mayuko Takata (高田万由子 Takata Mayuko, born January 5, 1971) is a Japanese actress, best known in the western world for her appearances on the Japanese TV show Iron Chef.

== Personal life ==
She was born in Tokyo, Japan. Her husband is Japanese violinist Taro Hakase. They currently reside in Tokyo, Japan.

== Iron Chef ==
Takata was a commentator and judge on the show. She has no culinary training.

== Language abilities ==
She is fluent in Japanese and English, and conversant in French.

== Selected filmography ==
=== Movies ===
- Goto Shi Kabushiki Kaisha (ゴト株式会社) (1993)
- Goto Shi Kabushiki Kaisha 2 (ゴト株式会社2) (1994)
- UFO Kamen Yakisoban: Ikari no Agedama Bomber (ＵＦＯ仮面ヤキソバン 怒りのあげ玉ボンバー) (1994) (Voice)

=== TV dramas ===
- June Bride (ジューン・ブライド) (1995, TBS)
- Miss Cinderella (1997, Fuji TV)
- Madame Mari (伝説のマダム, Densetsu no Madam) (2003, NTV)

=== Other television ===
- Takeshi & Itsumi's Heisei Board of Education (たけし・逸見の平成教育委員会, Takeshi, Itsumi no Heisei Kyōiku Iinkai) (1991, Fuji TV)
- Iron Chef (料理の鉄人, Ryōri no Tetsujin) (1994–1995, Fuji TV) - Judge and guest commentator
- Sunday Japon (サンデージャポン, Sandē Japon) (2001-2006, TBS) - Regular commentator
- Very Very Saturday! (ベリーベリーサタデー!) (2005, Kansai TV/Fuji TV)
- Let's Know It! (知っとこ, Shittoko) (2005, MBS/TBS)
- Baribari Value Around The World (世界バリバリ★バリュー) (2005, MBS/TBS)
- Hanamaru Market (はなまるマーケット) (2005, MBS/TBS)

== Media career ==
=== Radio ===
- Yokohama City File (1993-1995)

=== Written works ===
- The Cherry Blossoms Have Come Out: My Tokyo University Passing Story (サクラサク。～わたしの東大合格物語, Sakura Saku: Watashino Todai Gokaku Monogatari) (2000, 198 pages)
- Takata's Way: Advice For Successful Study (たかたま道～ミーハー学のススメ～, Takata Ma Michi: Miha Gaku No Susume) (2000, 173 pages)
- Takata was responsible for translating the Alistair, Le Crocodile Vert series of children's storybooks from French to Japanese. The three original books were authored by Florence Grazia and illustrated by Isabelle Charly.

- Alistair The Green Alligator (2004) - Original title: Alistair, Le Crocodile Vert
- Alistair The Green Alligator: Lucie And The Smile Doctor (2004) - Original title: Le Pari d'Alistair
- Alistair The Green Alligator: Lucie's Search For Treasure (2004) - Original title: La Croisière d'Alistair

- Mayuko Takata's Loveful Gift Recipe Cookbook (高田万由子の愛いっぱいの贈り物レシピ) (2005, 111 pages)
- 24 Hints For A Happier Family (家族がもっと幸せになる24のヒント) (2005, 143 pages)
- Takata has also published or participated in the publication of many essays and magazine articles, including:

- Jukenban Papiyon (受験版パピヨン) (1993, published by Gakken)
- Yasei Jidai (野生時代) (1993, published by Kadokawa Shoten)
- Asashi Chugakusei Weekly (朝日中学生ウィークリー) (1994, published by Asahi Shimbun)
- Kongetsuno Mitai Shiritai Kataritai (今月の見たい知りたい語りたい) (1995, published by Classy Magazine)
- Ripple (1995, published by Keihin Electric Express Railway)
- FYTTE (1996, published by Gakken)
- Raku (楽) (1997, published by Magazine House)
- Shinseikijin (新世紀人) (2001, published by Tokyo Shimbun)
- Yomiuri Shimbun Evening Newspaper (contributes an article every month)
- Fuji Bank Thanks... (contributes an article every month)
- Shinano Mainichi Shimbun (contributes an article every month)
- Felissimo (フェリシモ) (contributes an article every second month)
- Suku Suku Kosodate (すくすく子育て) (published by NHK Publications)
- Shinkin Visa: Clear Forecast (しんきんVISAはれ予報) (published by VISA)
- Kids Style (キッズスタイル)

=== Commercial Work ===
- Minolta
- JVC
- Coca-Cola (1994, "Lecturer" campaign)
- Rohto Pharmaceutical Co.
- Kagome Co., Ltd. (カゴメ株式会社) (for "100% Carrot Juice")
- Chubu Electric Power
- Calbee (カルビー, Karubi) (for "Autumn"-flavoured potato chips)
- Taisho Pharmaceutical
- Mitsui Fudosan ("1000 Cities - 1000 Towers" campaign)
- Mimatsu (三松)
- Tokyu Group (for "Tokyu Plaza")
- Sumiyoshi-Yamate Commons (Higashinada-ku, Kōbe)
- House Foods Corporation (for "Kokumaro"-brand tofu burger mix)
- Socie World (ソシエ・ワールド)
- Marriott International (for Okinawa Marriott Resort, Kariyushi Beach)

=== Stage Work ===
- We Are The World (1993) at Theater Apple, Shinjuku, Tokyo
- Tasoya Andon (1994) at Tokyo Takarazuka Theater, Chiyoda, Tokyo
- Kokumaro Na Onna Tachi (2001), at Nagoya, Aichi and Bunkamura Theater Cocoon, Tokyo

=== Miscellaneous ===
- Takata has been involved with the Pink Ribbon Smile Walk (for breast cancer awareness month)

== Political Appointment ==
Takata was appointed as Goodwill Ambassador to the Nation of France in 2000.
