= Omoide ni Kawaru Kimi: Memories Off =

Japanese visual novel

- You that became a Memory ~Memories Off~
- Artwork from the PlayStation 2 cover.

想い出にかわる君 ~メモリーズオフ~ (Omoide ni Kawaru Kimi ~Memorīzu Ofu~)
- Genre: Romance
- Video game
- Developer: KID
- Publisher: KID
- Genre: Visual novel
- Platform: Dreamcast, PlayStation 2, PlayStation Portable, PC, iPhone
- Released: November 28, 2002 (DC, PS2); August 13, 2008 (PSP)
- Related works
- Memories Off 3.5: Omoide no Kanata e OVA

Omoide ni Kawaru Kimi: Memories Off (想い出にかわる君 ~メモリーズオフ~, lit. You That Became a Memory ~Memories Off~) is a Japanese romance visual novel developed by KID for the Dreamcast and the PlayStation 2. It is the third game in the Memories Off series. The game was released for the Dreamcast and the PlayStation 2 on November 28, 2002. It was later ported to the PlayStation Portable. It was adapted into the first tale of an OVA series, titled as "Memories Off 3.5: Omoide no Kanata e".

== Story ==
Shougo is a lazy university student. He used to have a girlfriend called Kanata Kurosu, but one day she left him and he did not know anything about her. One day, he meets her at the Cubic Cafe, Shougo's usual relaxation spot, and a new story begins.

== Characters ==
Shougo Kagaya (加賀 正午, Kagaya Shōgo)
Voiced by: Hiro Shimono (OVA)
A first year student at Chihaya University.

Kanata Kurosu (黒須 カナタ, Kurosu Kanata)
Voiced by: Yukari Fukui
Voiced by: Ayumi Murata (OVA & sequels)
Shougo's ex-girlfriend. She leaves him without a trace.

Neo Kashima (荷嶋 音緒, Kashima Neo)
Voiced by: Ai Shimizu
A second year student at Chihaya First High. She wants to be a food journalist. Mifu's older sister.

Mifu Kashima (荷嶋 深歩, Kashima Mifu)
Voiced by: Yuri Shiratori
First year student at Chihaya First High and Neo's younger sister. She cannot walk and drives on a wheelchair. She has a cheerful personality and likes flowers.

Isako Narumi (鳴海 沙子, Narumi Isako)
Voiced by: Ayako Kawasumi
A first year student at Chihaya University Law Department with a cold attitude.

Nayuta Kitahara (北原 那由多, Kitahara Nayuta)
Voiced by: Mikako Takahashi
A first year student at Chihaya University Arts Department.

Hibiki Kodama (児玉 響, Kodama Hibiki)
Voiced by: Masumi Asano
A teenage freeter like Shin.

Tamaki Momose (百瀬 環, Momose Tamaki)
Voiced by: Miyuki Sawashiro
The second year high school student. Likes Kenji Miyazawa's Ginga Tetsudou no Yoru.

Ichitarou Tanaka (田中 一太郎, Tanaka Ichitarō)
Often called as Tenchou, he is the owner of a local cafe called Cubic Cafe. Most of the characters are frequent customers in this cafe.

Shinkurou Rikimaru (力丸 真紅郎, Rikimaru Shinkurō)
A frequent customer at Cubic Cafe and the older brother of a certain someone in Memories Off: Sorekara.

Tobira Hida (飛田 扉, Hida Tobira)
Voiced by: Chiyomaru Shikura
A frequent customer at Cubic Cafe. He grew up in an orphanage.

Shin Inaho (稲穂 信, Inaho Shin)
Voiced by: Junji Majima
The series' recurring character.

Yue Imasaka (今坂 唯笑, Imasaka Yue)
Voiced by: Megumi Nasu
Heroine of the first Memories Off. She studies at Fujikawa Nursing School. A frequent customer at Cubic Cafe. She makes a cameo in Memories Off: Sorekara.

Shizuru Shirakawa (白河 静流, Shirakawa Shizuru)
Voiced by: Shiho Kikuchi
A fourth year student in Chihaya University and Koyomi's best friend since high school. A pro-wrestling fan. Marked as a VERY dangerous driver by various people. She was a heroine in Memories Off 2nd.

Koyomi Kirishima (霧島 小夜美, Kirishima Koyomi)
Voiced by: Ruri Asano
A fourth year student in Chihaya University, and Shizuru's best friend since high school. Always refer herself as Beautiful University Student. Like Shizuru, she's a pro-wrestling fan as well. She was one of the heroines in the original Memories Off.

== Media ==
=== Anime ===
You that became a Memory ~Memories Off~ was adapted into the first half of an OVA series, titled as "Memories Off 3.5: Omoide no Kanata e". This OVA adapted Kanata's route in two episodes.

=== Music ===
The opening for all the versions of the game except the PSP port is Replay Machine by Nana Mizuki. The opening for the PSP port is Kimi no Kakera sung by Ayane. This song is also used as the opening for Memories Off: Sorekara.
