= Banana Prince =

1991 video game

- Developer: KID
- Publisher: Takara
- Producer: Motoyuki Inoue
- Designer: Shōji Takagi
- Programmer: Norihisa Kawamoto
- Artist: Masayuki Amano
- Composer: Nobuyuki Shioda
- Platform: Nintendo Entertainment System
- Release: JP: December 20, 1991; DE: February 1992
- Genre: Platform
- Mode: Single-player

Banana Prince (Note: Also known as The Great Adventures of the Prince Bananan (Japanese: バナナン王子の大冒険, Hepburn: Bananan Ōji no Daibōken) in Japan.) is a platform game developed by KID released in Japan by Takara on December 20, 1991 for the Family Computer. The German version was released in February 1992 for the Nintendo Entertainment System, and features slightly different graphics and game show questions.

== Gameplay ==
Stage 1-2

As an Island Native, the Banana Prince is on a quest to retrieve the stolen weapons of the island; along the way he'll pick up companions and even appear on a game show, which allows you to warp to another level. Like Jack and the Beanstalk, he has with him a bag of seeds that allows him to grow a flower and climb it. There are also hidden platforms, and doors that can only be reached by collecting flower tokens (which allow him to grow a bigger flower).

== Reception ==
Reception

Review scores
Publication	Score
Aktueller Software Markt	6/12
Famitsu	20/40
Mega Fun	64/100
Total!	3- (C-)
Video Games (DE)	71%
Hippon Super!	4/10

Banana Prince was met with mixed reception from critics since its release. Aktueller Software Markt's Thomas Morgen commended the plant-growing mechanic and overall playability but felt mixed in regards to the audiovisual presentation, stating that the game was "rather boring". Likewise, Mega Fun's Markus Appel and Sandrie Souleiman felt that the visuals were bearable but praised the music. Both Appel and Souleiman liked the question-based bonus rounds due to their simplicity as well as the story but ultimately remarked that it was an above-average title due to lack of direction. In contrast, Video Games' Stephan Englhart noted that its focus on collecting fruit was fresh and gave positive remarks to the varied character animations, technical presentation, precise controls and graphically varied stages. Total!'s Thomas Hellwig commented that its gameplay and controls were good but the rest was "rather sloppy" due to the visuals, music and poor text translation.

Retrospective reviews for Banana Prince have been positive. Game Freaks 365's Stan Stepanic compared the game with Kirby's Adventure due to its styling and storyline. Stepanic gave praise to the graphics due to the lack of flickering and slowdown, sound design, gameplay and creativity but remarked that the German questions could prove challenging for those not versed in the language. Hardcore Gaming 101's Kurt Kalata gave the title a modest recommendation.
