= Stone Protectors =

- Stone Protectors "Forged in Fire" British VHS
- Written by: Marty Isenberg; Robert Skir; Peter Lawrence; Matthew Malach; J. Larry Carroll; David Bennett-Carren; Richard T. Murphy; Chris Hubbell; Sam Graham; Grant Morgan
- Directed by: Dorie Rich; Susan Blu (voice director)
- Starring: Don Brown; Jim Byrnes; Ted Cole; Ian James Corlett; Scott McNeil; John Tench; Cathy Weseluck; Terry Klassen; Rob Morton; Louise Vallance; Campbell Lane; Phil Hayes; Kathleen Barr
- Composer: Steve Zuckerman
- Countries of origin: United States; United Kingdom; France
- No. of episodes: 13

Production
- Executive producer: Stephanie Graziano
- Producer: Michael Hack
- Running time: 30 Minutes
- Production companies: Graz Entertainment; Sachs TV Entertainment; Hanho Studios

Original release
- Network: Syndication
- Release: January 15, 1993

Stone Protectors is a 1993 multi-media entertainment property consisting primarily of an action figure line and animated series. The series also had a tie-in video game released for the Super NES and the Sega Genesis. It was one of several attempts to market the troll doll craze of the early 1990s to young boys, similar to the official line of Battle Trolls toys. While not particularly successful, Stone Protectors generally followed in the same vein as contemporaries, including Toxic Crusaders, Swamp Thing, and the highly popular Teenage Mutant Ninja Turtles.

== Back-story ==
A kingdom built of crystals came under attack by the reptilian humanoid and troll-like Saurians whose leader, Zok, desired the powerful crystals protected by the Empress. Zok broke into the castle and reached for the crystals only to see them explode into pieces and fly to Earth.

After being thrown out the back door of a New York City club, a rock band known as the Rock Detectors found the five magical stones which gave them troll-like appearances and special skills (not the least of which is playing good music), and they are now collectively known as the Protectors. This put them at odds with the music-hating Zok and his henchman Zink who call themselves the Predators.

- Cornelius, the group's leader, holds the green stone, which made him a samurai with an assortment of weaponry (katana, shuriken, and a pair of nunchaku made of microphones). He is the band's lead singer, but also plays the guitar.
- Chester holds the red stone, which gave him immense strength and made him an expert at wrestling. He plays the bass guitar and saxophone.
- Clifford "Cliff" holds the blue stone, which made him an expert rock climber. He is the band's drummer.
- Angus holds the yellow stone, which made him a soldier excelling in military combat and able to turn ordinary objects into weapons. He plays the keyboard.
- Maxwell holds the orange stone, which made him an "accelerator" - an athletic speedster who sports in-line skates. He plays the guitar.

== Animated series ==
A short-lived cartoon series based on the characters debuted in 1993. In it, Empress Opal of Mythrandir splits the legendary Great Crystal into six pieces to keep it out of Zok's hands. Zok manages to capture one piece, but the other five bond with the future Stone Protectors, spiriting them away to Mythrandir to help Opal upset Zok's schemes and spread a sentiment of peace and freedom with their music. The series lasted one season; 8 out of 13 episodes were released on VHS in 1994 by Family Home Entertainment, the whole series was released on VHS in England. Piko Interactive acquired the intellectual property rights to Stone Protectors from former owner Kam Toys. On March 2, 2021, a Kickstarter campaign was launched to get the entire 13-episode series released to DVD. The initial goal for the Kickstarter was $30,000 with further stretch goals such as a comic book, Blu-ray and a new episode for the series. The Kickstarter only met its main funding goal on March 29, 2021. The series was released on DVD on July 5, 2022. A special edition boxset was also released. In January 2025, it was announced Discotek Media would release the series on Blu-ray. It was released on October 28, 2025.

It is notable that while the advertisements for the action figures attempted to tie the Stone Protectors into the troll doll fad, the series seemed eager to avoid the comparison. For instance, it replaced the line "trolls on a roll" from the theme song in the commercials with "Don't you know?".

The series has also been broadcast on the BBC in the United Kingdom, RTB in Brunei, TV2 in Malaysia, Bop TV in South Africa, ZBC in Zimbabwe, Channel 33 in the United Arab Emirates and TV2 in New Zealand.

=== Episodes ===
No.	Title	Written by	Original release date
1	"Forged in Fire"	Martin Isenberg and Robert Skir	January 15, 1993
2	"Stranded in Mythrandir"	Peter Lawrence	TBA
3	"Levity"	Matthew Malach	TBA
4	"Return of Blackheart"	J. Larry Carroll and David Bennett Carren	TBA
5	"Weaponogs"	Richard T. Murphy	TBA
6	"Fan or Foe"	Chris Hubbell and Sam Graham	TBA
7	"Island Hopping"	Martin Isenberg and Robert Skir	TBA
8	"Digging In"	Peter Lawrence	TBA
9	"Between Zok and the Deep Blue Sea"	Grant Morgan	TBA
10	"The Test"	J. Larry Carroll and David Bennett Carren	TBA
11	"The Crystal Vampire"	Matthew Cartsonis and Peter Lawrence	Unaired
12	"The Wall of Sound"	Richard T. Murphy	Unaired
13	"Going Home"	Sam Graham and Chris Hubbell	Unaired

== Action figures ==
The Stone Protectors action figures were produced by the Ace Novelty Toy Company. All of the figures were roughly 5" tall and featured cut joints at the neck, shoulders, and elbows as well as ball joints at the hips. Their heads were a soft, rubbery material with tall, synthetic hair sticking straight out the top. In rotating the right arm of a Stone Protectors figure, a flint module would ignite inside its chest, creating a quick yet bright flash seen through the translucent chest emblem. A second series of sports-themed figures was also released. Princess Opal was never made as a figure, nor were there any generic Saurian Guards.

The toyline as well as the cartoon that followed it were seen as poor imitations of the popular Teenage Mutant Ninja Turtles line of toys and cartoon series and overlooked by many.

Series 1	Series 2: Sports Heroes/Villains	Vehicles
Angus the Soldier	Angus the Prince of Punch	Anti-Aircraft Barbeque
Chester the Wrestler	Chester the Gridiron Giant	Hang Glider Bomber
Clifford the Rock Climber	Clifford the Jumpin' Jammer	Mortar Launching Golf Cart
Cornelius the Samurai	Cornelius the Grandslam Guru	Mow 'N' Surf Attack Scooter
Maxwell the Accelerator	Maxwell the Slapshot	
Zok the Evil Leader	Suckerpuncher	
Zink the Horrible Hatchetman	Tackle Jackal	

== Video game ==
Stone Protectors
- Developer: Eurocom
- Publishers: Kemco; Piko Interactive
- Programmers: Ian Denny; Tim Rogers; Ashley Finley
- Artists: Mat Sneap; Colin Garratt; Matt Dixon; Nigel Quine-Bentley; Andy Bee
- Composer: Steve Duckworth
- Platforms: Super NES, Sega Genesis
- Release: SNES; November 1994; Mega Drive/Genesis; November 1994
- Genre: Side-scrolling beat 'em up
- Modes: Single-player, two-player Co-op

A Super NES game based on the property was released in November 1994 by Kemco. A Genesis version was developed and completed, but not released back then. This version, intended to be published by Vic Tokai, was leaked to the public in 2010 by Nesplayer.com. It was finally given an official release by Piko Interactive in March 2022, alongside a re-release of the SNES version.

Stone Protectors features 10 levels in which the heroes – Clifford, Cornelius, Chester, Maxwell, and Angus – battle The Predators throughout their mission to retrieve Zok's crystal and bring them all back to the kingdom. Weapons can also be acquired but only used by certain characters. Depending on the difficulty setting, the game's ending scene also features different music in which the Stone Protectors are seen performing as a band.

GamePro gave the game a generally negative review, commenting that the graphics are good but the animation is poor, and the controls make it difficult to pull off special attacks or counteract enemy attacks. They concluded that the game, while not without merits, is overall "a frustrating journey."

== Other merchandise ==
Pressman Toy Corp. released a Stone Protectors board game. In late 1993, Harvey Comics debuted Stone Protectors "Premiere Issue" (effectively an issue #0), followed by issues #1–3.
