= UFO Kamen Yakisoban =

1994 beat-'em-up video game

- Cover art
- Developer: KID
- Publisher: Den'Z
- Composer: Nobuyuki Shioda
- Platform: Super Famicom
- Release: JP: October 14, 1994
- Genre: Beat 'em up
- Mode: Single-player

UFO Kamen Yakisoban: Kettler no Kuroi Inbō (UFO仮面ヤキソバン ケトラーの黒い陰謀, "UFO Mask Yakisoban: Kettler's Dark Conspiracy") is a 1994 beat 'em up developed by KID and published by Den’Z for the Super Famicom.

== Background ==
UFO Kamen Yakisoban was the main character, played by Michael Tomioka, in a series of TV commercials for "UFO" instant yakisoba noodles produced by Nissin Foods. A feature film was released in 1994 directly to VHS video, which also featured Dave Spector as Kettler. The theme from the movie, sung by Hironobu Kageyama, was released on a CD single.

== Video game ==
The video game was initially only distributed as a prize, with 3,000 copies being promised as part of a prize draw among consumers of the eponymous instant yakisoba. This version features real-life pictures of the commercial actors on the cover and cartridge. Later, the game was released for sale, in a version that does not feature the actor's likenesses, and that lacks a congratulatory introduction.

In the game, the noodle superhero wants to marry the princess, but Kettler wants her for himself. The hero wears a bowl of UFO yakisoba on his head. There are five stages to overcome until the princess can be rescued.

== See also ==
- Mayuko Takata
