= Kick Master =

1992 video game

- Developer: KID
- Publisher: Taito America
- Directors: Hisayoshi Ichikawa; Motoyuki Inoue
- Producer: Ken Lobb
- Designer: Okumura
- Programmer: Shinobu Yagawa
- Artists: Kazuhiro Iizuka; Tsutomu Ozawa
- Composers: Nobuyuki Shioda; Yusuke Takahama
- Platform: Nintendo Entertainment System
- Release: NA: January 1992
- Genres: Action, platform
- Mode: Single-player

Kick Master (sometimes KickMaster) is an action game developed by KID and published by Taito for the Nintendo Entertainment System in 1992. The game has some role-play elements, such as leveling up.

== Gameplay ==
Gameplay screenshot

Kick Master resembles early games in the Castlevania series. Enemies are fought using martial arts kicks and magic spells. Defeated enemies drop three items that will either help or hurt the player character Thonolan. When Thonolan gains a level, his maximum MP is increased and new moves are learned.

== Plot ==
The castle of Lowrel is attacked and burned by the monsters and magic of the powerful witch Belzed. In the attack, the King and the Queen are slain and their only child, Princess Silphee, is kidnapped. The king's guards were all killed, except for the knight Macren. He and his younger brother, Thonolan, an aspiring martial artist, take off on a long journey to free the princess. As the fight against Belzed's minions commences, Macren is mortally wounded by a skeleton. With his dying breath, he pleads his brother to use his "great kicking skills" to avenge him.

There are a total of eight destinations that Thonolan must bravely journey through before confronting and defeating Belzed:

If the player manages to complete the game, the evil Belzed is destroyed and Thonolan rescues the princess Silphee. He torches down Belzed's Tower and disappears, never to be heard from again. The player is given an opportunity to try to beat the game again on a higher difficulty level. There are a total of three difficulty levels in this game. Once the third difficulty level is complete, the credits will roll.

== Reception ==
Reception

Review scores
Publication	Score
AllGame	3.5/5
GamePro	21 / 25
Nintendo Power	13.7 / 20
HonestGamers	3.5/5

GamePro gave Kick Master a positive review upon the release.
