= The Original Battle Trolls =

Hasbro action figures from the early 1990s

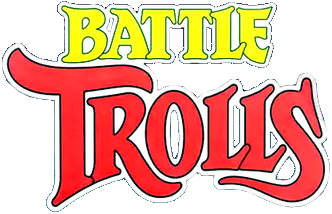
- Type: Action figures
- Company: Hasbro
- Country: United States
- Availability: 1992–1993

The Original Battle Trolls were a brand of action figures produced by Hasbro from 1992 to 1993. They were made in attempt to market the popular concept of troll dolls to young boys in the early 1990s.

== Overview ==
Introduced in 1992 at $4.99 to $6.99, the trolls were marketed with the slogan “Big Haired Dudes with Bad Attitudes” and were actually quite large at approximately 4 3/4 inches tall (not including roughly 4 inches of hair). The line did not establish a story arc to provide a unifying narrative for the characters as a group. However each individual troll was provided a brief biographical profile (in parody of a G.I. Joe file card), and, details on their cardbacks as how to properly "neglect" them suggested that the owner hide them in "a dark, smelly place" and keep them "cranky, mean and ready to fight anything or anyone for years!". In association with their tough nature, many of them had facial stitches and their toes poking through their boots.

The line featured 26 individual characters, two of which were repaints available in special "vehicle sets". Each Troll featured a single cut joint at the waist and included two handheld accessories. All but four had an accessory designed to launch a projectile by flicking with the finger. The individual characters were styled on either generic action/adventure themes (a pirate, a ninja, two Vikings, a robot, a policeman, a knight, a punk rocker, and a Wild West outlaw); athletes (an American football player, an ice hockey player, a boxer, and a skateboarder); military servicemen (a general, a navy diver, and an air force pilot); monsters (a vampire, Frankenstein's monster, a werewolf, and two cyclopes); or outright spoofs of famous franchises (John Rambo, the Terminator cyborg, Superman, a Mad Max-style villain, and The Ultimate Warrior).

While initially successful, the Battle Trolls line failed to achieve the popular success that the 'original' troll toys enjoyed. Though much of the line consisted of references to classic fiction and popular culture, it was retired in 1993 after a third, much scarcer run with eight final characters. A fourth series was planned, but never produced. The prototypes were displayed at the 1993 New York Toy Fair. This featured a line of six villains called the Evil Horde, including trolls styled after the Joker, Swamp Thing, an Alien, and one that looked like a hooded executioner. A promotional photo of the group can be viewed online.

Several imitations of Battle Trolls were made by competing companies: "Stone Protectors" by Ace Novelty Toy Company, "Troll Warriors" by Tyco, "Troll Fighter" by Simba, and "Troll Force" by Toys 'n Things.

== Characters ==
Battle Trolls were introduced in three assortments.

=== Series 1 (1992) ===
- Sgt. Troll - a John Rambo spoof
- Trollaf - a Viking
- Trollminator - a Terminator cyborg spoof
- Troll-Clops - a mythical cyclops
- Nunchuk Troll - a ninja
- Cap'N Troll - a sea pirate
- T.D. Troll - an American football player (T.D. stands for touchdown)
- Count Trollula - a vampire/Count Dracula spoof with a Batman-like costume

==== Special sets ====
- Capture Net, with Bulls-Eye Troll (Troll-Clops repaint)
- Trollasaurus, with SvenTroll (Trollaf repaint)

=== Series 2 (1992) ===
- Sir Trollahad - a knight (the name is a pun on Galahad)
- Roadhog Troll - a Mad Max villain spoof
- Super Troll - a Superman spoof
- Officer PaTroll - a police officer
- General Troll - a military general
- Trollbot - a purely mechanical robot
- Punk Troll - a punk rocker
- Franken Troll - a Frankenstein's monster

=== Series 3 (1993) ===
- Jack CousTroll - a navy diver (the name is a pun on Jacques Cousteau)
- Troll-timate Wrestler - a spoof of The Ultimate Warrior
- Thrasher Troll - a thrash metal skateboarder
- Quick Draw Troll - a Wild West outlaw cowboy
- K.O. Troll - a boxer (K.O. stands for knockout)
- Wolfman Troll - a werewolf
- Slapshot Troll - an ice hockey player
- Ace Troll - an air force pilot
