= Troll doll =

Type of plastic doll with furry up-combed hair

- A "wizard" troll doll, manufactured by Russ Berrie in the 1990s
- Type: Doll
- Invented by: Thomas Dam
- Company: Dam family (1959–present)
- Country: Denmark
- Availability: 1959–present

A troll doll (Danish: Gjøltrold) is a type of plastic doll with furry up-combed hair depicting a troll, also known as a Dam doll after their creator Danish woodcutter Thomas Dam. The inspiration came from trolls in old Scandinavian folklore. The toys are also known as good luck trolls.

The dolls were first created in 1956 and were larger and made from a softer, more rubbery material than the smaller versions that became popular in 1959, before becoming one of the United States' biggest toy fads in the early 1960s. They became popular again during the 1970s through the 1990s and were copied by several manufacturers under different names. During the 1990s, several video games and a video show were created based on troll dolls.

In 2005, the Dam company licensed the brand to DIC Entertainment to modernize the brand by creating a cartoon under the name Trollz, but the show only lasted one season. The failed cartoon also led to a lawsuit after a counter-claim lawsuit.

In 2013, the brand was bought by DreamWorks Animation, with an animated feature film called Trolls being released in 2016, followed by two sequels, released in 2020 and 2023.

== Toy history ==
Troll dolls were created by Danish fisherman and woodcutter Thomas Dam. Dam was initially a baker, but when flour supplies suffered, he sought numerous other jobs, including fishing and selling logs. Whenever he was home, he would carve little wooden figures depicting various mythical creatures for his children. Eventually he started selling the toys, and by 1956 was developing larger figures for department stores throughout Scandinavia. In 1959, Dam opened a factory, Dam Things Establishment, and began producing the dolls out of rubber; in 1961 they switched to using PVC plastic and made the dolls in various sizes under the name Good Luck Trolls. They became popular in several European countries during the early 1960s, shortly before they were introduced in the United States. They became one of the United States' biggest toy fads from the autumn of 1963 to 1965. The originals were of the highest quality, also called Dam dolls and featuring sheep wool hair and glass eyes. Their sudden popularity, along with an error in the copyright notice of Thomas Dam's original product, resulted in cheaper imitations.

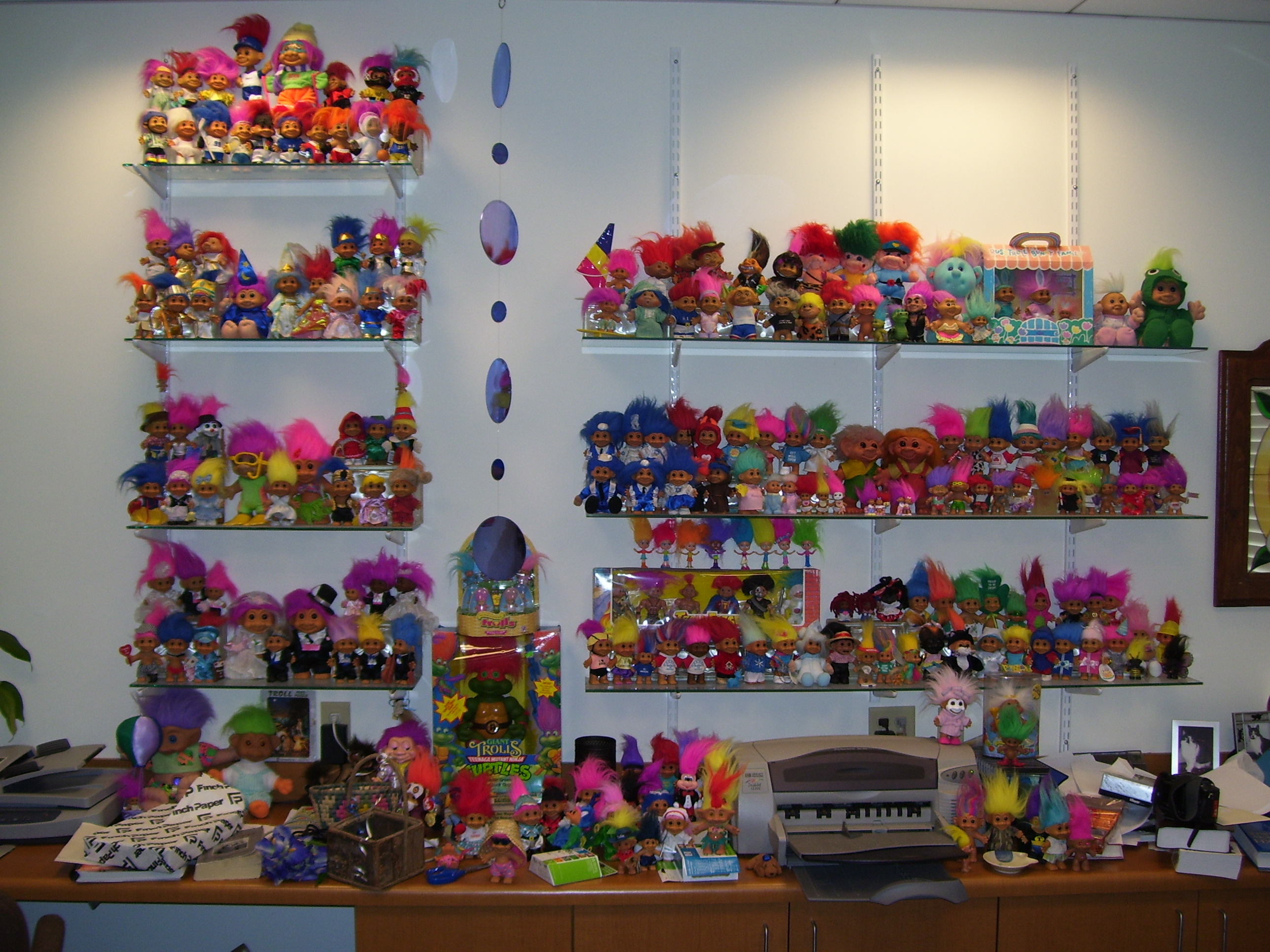
A collection of troll dolls

The Dam company never stopped its production of trolls in Denmark, where they were always a popular item. In the late 1980s, the Dam trolls started making another comeback in North America. E.F.S. Marketing Associates, Inc. was one of the few corporations granted permission to import and market the Thomas Dam trolls for resale in the United States. These Dam Trolls were marketed under the trade name of Norfin Trolls, with an "Adopt A Norfin Troll" logo on the tags.

During the period of popularity in the early to mid-1990s, several attempts were made to market the troll dolls to young boys. This included action figure lines such as The Original Battle Trolls from Hasbro, the Stone Protectors franchise, and Teenage Mutant Ninja Turtle Trolls. The popular Mighty Max line also had a series named Hairy Heads, also known as Dread Heads.

In 2003, the Dam copyright was restored by the Uruguay Round Agreements Act. The Uneeda Doll Company, a company that made millions of US dollars by manufacturing troll dolls in the U.S., challenged the restoration. The US Court of Appeals for the Second Circuit upheld the lower court's preliminary injunction, enjoining Uneeda from manufacturing, distributing, or selling "Wish-nik" troll dolls. The Toy Industry Association named troll dolls in its Century of Toys List, a list of the 100 most memorable and most creative toys of the 20th century.

In 2005, Dam licensed the trolls to DIC Entertainment as Trollz. With this, the licensing campaign saw the troll dolls being pushed towards young girls, featuring products such as fashion dolls and fashion accessories. The campaign failed and eventually lead into a lawsuit.

In 2007, DIC sued the Dam company, claiming that they alleged claims of fraud in the inducement and negligent misrepresentation in connection with Dam's troll doll, and DIC's Trollz, which was created after DIC licensed the brand from Dam. Dam counter-sued DIC, claiming that the company financially misrepresented its ability to create and market a modern troll doll toy campaign and destroyed the image and goodwill of the doll.

In 2013, DreamWorks Animation acquired the intellectual property for the Trolls franchise from the Dam Family and Dam Things and became the exclusive worldwide licensor of the merchandise rights, except for Scandinavia, where Dam Things remains the licenser.

== In entertainment ==
=== Television ===
In 1991, Créativité & Développement released a cartoon special called The Magic Trolls and the Troll Warriors, the special featured Magic Trolls battling against King Nolaf and his Troll Warriors.

In 1992, DIC (who would later produce Trollz in 2005) released a half hour special called Super Trolls. The special featured three heroic trolls who fight an evil troll named Craven. The special was released on VHS by Buena Vista Home Video.

In 1993, Graz Entertainment and Sachs TV Entertainment released an action cartoon based on the troll dolls called Stone Protectors. The show featured a kingdom built out of crystals that came under attack by the reptilian troll-like Saurians; their leader, Zok, desired the powerful crystals protected by the Empress. Zok broke into the castle and reached for the crystals only to see them explode into pieces and fly to the Earth.

In 2005, DIC as part of a licensing campaign with Dam, they produced Trollz. An animated TV series that featured five teenage girl trolls named after the gems on their belly buttons, their names are Amethyst, Ruby, Sapphire, Topaz, and Onyx. The trolls call themselves the “Best Friends for Life”. They live in a city called Trollzopolis, a city within a magical world. They use magic to help them with their everyday life. They also save the world from an evil green gremlin named Simon and his red monster dog friend named Snarf.

=== Film ===
A direct-to-video sing-along special was released in 1992 titled The Trollies Radio Show, with puppet trolls singing songs such as "Kokomo", "Woolly Bully", and "Do Wah Diddy", as well as some original songs.

GoodTimes Entertainment also released a direct-to-video sing along series Treehouse Trolls in 1992. The two videos in the series were Treehouse Trolls Forest of Fun and Wonder and Treehouse Trolls Birthday Day.

In 2016, following DreamWorks’ purchase of the troll property, they produced Trolls, an animated musical comedy film based on the Troll dolls. The film was released on November 4, 2016. It was directed by Mike Mitchell and co-directed by Walt Dohrn, with Anna Kendrick and Justin Timberlake providing the voices of Poppy and Branch. A sequel, Trolls World Tour, was scheduled for theatrical release on April 10, 2020, in North America. The film was originally planned to be released theatrically in the United States on this day, but the film was released simultaneously in drive-in theaters, as regular movie theaters closed due to the restrictions caused by the COVID-19 pandemic, and through Premium VOD in the United States, Canada, United Kingdom, South Korea and Italy. This affected the number of projections and the box office performance of the film. As the pandemic receded, the film was released back in regular movie theaters. Another sequel, Trolls Band Together was released exclusively in theaters on November 17, 2023.

=== Video games ===
Trolls, a platform game, was released in 1993 for Amiga, MS-DOS, and Commodore 64. Other games released were Trolls on Treasure Island, a modified re-release of Dudes with Attitude and The Trolls in Crazyland, a localized version of Doki! Doki! Yūenchi: Crazy Land Daisakusen for the Nintendo Entertainment System, and Super Troll Islands for the Super NES.

== See also ==
- Gonk
- Trolls (franchise)
