= Ação Games =

Brazilian video game magazine (1991–2003)

- Categories: Video games, Technology
- First issue: May 1991
- Final issue: January 2002
- Company: Editora Azul, Editora Abril
- Country: Brazil, Argentina
- Based in: São Paulo
- Language: Portuguese
- ISSN: 0104-1630

Ação Games was a Brazilian magazine specialized in video games that circulated from 1991 to 2002.

== History ==
Released as a special edition of the sports magazine A Semana em Ação, which replaced Placar at Editora Abril in August 1990, it had its first edition in December 1990 under the title A Semana em Ação: Especial Games (The Week in Action: Games Special). As the most prominent words in the title were "Ação" (Action) and "Games", the magazine soon was called Ação Games.

There was also a second edition in March 1991, but the "mother magazine" did not last long, being extinct in the first half of that year. However, the special about games had its title bought by Editora Azul, who started to edit it as a monthly magazine since October 1991, entitled Ação Games. It was created by, among others, Marcelo Duarte of ESPN Brasil and that today commands the video games TV show Game Up, from the same television network.

== Growth ==
With news about releases and tips on how to pass through stages in various games, the magazine had grown for about two years, along with the video game market in Brazil, and was published in Argentina under the name Action Games. When the editorial line began to favor one manufacturer over another, the quality began to be questioned. Aggressive competition only accentuated this situation, especially when, in 1994, the magazines Super Game and Game Power merged under the Editora Nova Cultural label and changed the market scenario.

== Decline ==
The rise of the Internet and the rapid successive changes in the magazine's profile, which culminated in the creation of Frango (a character created by the editors, who always answered the readers' letters in a rude way and spoke ill of the magazine itself), had also contributed to the loss of space of the magazine until it stopped being published in January 2002 According to the last editorial, the magazine would cease to be monthly and would be released as special editions without basis. Only two such issues were released, both in 2003.

== See also ==
- Gameroom magazine
