= Low G Man: The Low Gravity Man =

1990 video game

- Developer: KID
- Publishers: NA: Taxan; EU: Nintendo
- Producers: Kuniharu Hosoda; Shōji Takagi
- Designer: Ken Lobb
- Programmers: Norihisa Kawamoto; Shinobu Yagawa
- Composers: Nobuyuki Shioda; Norio Nakagata; Ryota Musha
- Platform: NES
- Release: NA: September 1990; EU: 1991
- Genre: Platform
- Mode: Single-player

Low G Man: The Low Gravity Man is a platform game developed by KID and published in 1990 by Taxan in North America and by Nintendo in Europe for the Nintendo Entertainment System.

Low G Man was met with mixed reception from critics since its initial release; many felt divided in regards to the graphics, sound and gameplay, while common complaints were geared towards the jerky background scrolling, choppy animations, small character sprites and color scheme but praise was given to the fast-paced soundtrack and large bosses. Retrospective commentary has been mostly positive.

== Gameplay ==
Gameplay screenshot of chapter 1-1

This video game was unusual for a science fiction game in that rather than the usual laser gun weapon, the player had a freeze ray that did no damage to enemies; once they were frozen, the player had to stab them from the top or bottom with an extending spear. Other weapons included fireballs, boomerangs, 'force-waves,' and bombs. The name of the game derives from the protagonist's high-powered jumping, which at its maximum power reaches three screen-heights; this allows the player to kill enemies without freezing them, which generated more power-ups. The plot was a typical alien invasion scenario, in which evil aliens took over a robot-manufacturing planet.

The game includes a password feature for players to restore their progress after receiving a game over screen.

== Development and release ==
Designer Ken Lobb spoke on the inspiration for the game stating, "The Low G Man story is actually John Carter of Mars, you know, I like the idea of jumping super high. The movie was okay, this was the book, long before the movie. Those were the first novels I read as a kid, the first three books, that idea I really became fixated with."

== Reception ==
Reception

Review scores
Publication	Score
AllGame	2.5/5
Electronic Gaming Monthly	6/10, 8/10, 6/10, 5/10
Joypad	75%
Joystick	69%
Player One	89%
Video Games (DE)	68%
VideoGames & Computer Entertainment	7/10
Mean Machines	84%
VideoGame	4/5

Low G Man: The Low Gravity Man received a mixture of opinions from critics, though a slight majority gave it a positive recommendation. Electronic Gaming Monthly's four reviewers criticized the color palette, choppy animations and small character sprites but commended the overall visuals, large bosses and stage variety, regarding it as an above-average action game. VideoGames & Computer Entertainment's Chris Bieniek and criticized the game for the jerky animations of its main character and poor background scrolling, which he felt it was exacerbated by the low-gravity jump. However, Bieniek gave positive remarks to the graphics and fast-paced music but ultimately felt mixed in regards to the playability and its execution. In a similar manner, Brazilian magazine VideoGame also gave positive remarks to the audiovisual presentation and difficulty.

Mean Machines's Richard Leadbetter and Julian Rignall praised the overall presentation, addictive gameplay and longevity. Both Leadbetter and Rignall echoed the same opinions as EGM and VG&CE in regards to the graphics, jerky scrolling and color scheme, while sound design was also criticized for being grating and sparse. Like other reviewers, Joystick's Jean-François Morisse criticized the jerky horizontal scrolling and visual color scheme but also noted that the enemies are uninteresting aside from the large bosses. Morisse also criticized the character animations and controls but gave the sound a positive remark. In contrast to other reviewers, Player One's Christophe Delpierre praised its graphics, sprite animations, sound, difficulty, longevity and overall gameplay. Joypad's Sébastien Hamon felt mixed in regards to the audiovisual presentation and controls, whlie he criticized the action for feeling slow. Video Games' Jan Barysch stated that "Low G Man is a good mix of skill, action, and combat tactics."

Retrospective reviews for Low G Man have been mostly positive. AllGame's Brett Alan Weiss noted its plot, weapon system and large bosses but criticized the slow character movement and gameplay for being clunky. However, Weiss commended the fast-paced soundtrack. HonestGamers' Rob Hamilton found it to be an enjoyable game, regarding the low-gravity jumping ability to be a novelty and noted that its ending changes with each playthrough. Hardcore Gaming 101's Michael Plasket regarded the gameplay to be mostly fun due to the protagonist's ability to perform extremely high jumps and unorthodox weapons. Plasket gave positive remarks to the futuristic industrial-style graphics, use of the Nintendo Entertainment System's color palette and upbeat music but criticized its choppy animations.
