= KID =

Japanese game development company

KID Corp. 株式会社キッド
- Industry: Consumer games Video games
- Founded: May 12, 1988; 38 years ago
- Defunct: 2006; 20 years ago
- Headquarters: Tokyo, Japan
- Key people: Hisaaki Ichikawa, President
- Revenue: ¥92.9m (March 2006)
- Number of employees: 41
- Website: www.kid-game.jp

KID (Kindle Imagine Develop) was a Japan-based company specializing in porting and developing bishōjo games. It went bankrupt in 2006 and its intellectual properties have been transferred to multiple companies. Most of the IPs are currently owned by Mages.

== History ==
KID was founded in 1988, with capital of 160 million yen and 31 employees. In the early 1990s, it served primarily as a contract developer. Notable titles from this era include Burai Fighter, Low G Man, G.I. Joe, Isolated Warrior and Recca. In 1997, it began porting PC games to games consoles. In 1999, it released an original title called Memories Off on PlayStation, which later became its first well-known series. Pepsiman was also released in 1999, to little initial success, but the title eventually became seen as a cult classic. In 2000, it released the original title Never 7: The End of Infinity, the first in the Infinity series. KID created the underground PlayStation game Board Game Top Shop. In 2005, KID became a sponsor of the Japanese drama series Densha Otoko.

The company declared bankruptcy in 2006. However, in February 2007 it was announced that KID's intellectual properties had been acquired by the CyberFront Corporation. CyberFront would continue all unfinished projects until its own closure in December 2013.

Kaga Create then bought CyberFront Corporation and owned the rights to KID's works. After Kaga Create closed down, 5pb. bought Cyberfront's assets which also included all of KID's works.

== Works ==
=== Infinity series ===
- Infinity Cure
- Never 7: The End of Infinity
- Ever 17: The Out of Infinity
- Remember 11: The Age of Infinity
- 12Riven: The Psi-Climinal of Integral

=== Memories Off series ===
- Memories Off
- Memories Off 2nd
- You that became a Memory ~Memories Off~
- Memories Off ~And then~
- Memories Off ~And Then Again~
- Memories Off 5: Togireta Film
- Memories Off #5 encore
- Your Memories Off: Girl's Style

=== Other ===
- Blocken (Arcade)
- Armored Police Metal Jack (Game Boy)
- Kingyo Chūihō! 2 Gyopichan o Sagase! (Game Boy)
- Battle Grand Prix (SNES)
- Jumpin' Derby (Super Famicom)
- Super Bowling (SNES)
- Super Jinsei Game (series) (2 & 3) (Super Famicom)
- Fastest Lap (Game Boy, 1991)
- Chibi Maruko-chan: Okozukai Daisakusen (Game Boy, 1990)
- Chibi Maruko-Chan 2: Deluxe Maruko World (Game Boy, 1991)
- Chibi Maruko-chan 3: Mezase! Game Taishou no Maki (Game Boy, 1992)
- Chibi Maruko-chan 4: Korega Nihon Dayo Ouji Sama (Game Boy, 1992)
- Chibi Maruko-Chan: Maruko Deluxe Gekijou (Game Boy, 1995)
- Genjin Kotts (Game Boy, 1995)
- Gamera: Guardian of the Universe (Game Boy, 1995)
- Burai Fighter
- Low G Man: The Low Gravity Man
- Bananan Ouji no Daibouken
- Kick Master
- G.I. Joe
- G.I. Joe: The Atlantis Factor
- Rock 'n' Ball
- Sumo Fighter: Tōkaidō Basho
- UFO Kamen Yakisoban
- Sutobasu Yarō Shō: 3 on 3 Basketball
- Mini 4WD Shining Scorpion Let's & Go!!
- Pepsiman
- Doki! Doki! Yūenchi: Crazy Land Daisakusen (Famicom)
- Ai Yori Aoshi (PS2 and PC adaptation)
- Ryu-Koku (final game released before the bankruptcy)
- Separate Hearts
- Ski Air Mix
- Recca (Famicom Shooter created for the "Summer Carnival '92" gaming tournament)
- We Are*
- Close to: Inori no Oka
- Yume no Tsubasa
- Max Warrior: Wakusei Kaigenrei
- Kaitou Apricot (PlayStation)
- Kiss yori... (Sega Saturn and WonderSwan)
- 6 Inch my Darling (Sega Saturn)
- Dokomademo Aoku... (consumer port of TopCat's Hateshinaku Aoi, Kono Sora no Shita de...)
- Kagayaku Kisetsu e (consumer port of Tactics' One: Kagayaku Kisetsu e)
- She'sn
- Screen (consumer port of Ather's Campus ~Sakura no Mau Naka de~)
- Emmyrea (consumer port of Penguin Soft's Nemureru Mori no Ohime-sama)
- My Merry May
- Iris
- Flamberge no Seirei (consumer port of Nikukyuu's Mei King)
- Prism Heart (Dreamcast)
- Oujisama Lv1 (PlayStation)
- Boku to Bokura no Natsu (Dreamcast)
- Monochrome (PlayStation 2 and PSP)
- Hōkago Ren'ai Club – Koi no Etude (Sega Saturn)
- Subete ga F ni Naru (PlayStation)
- Treasure Strike (Dreamcast)
