= Ayane (singer) =

Japanese singer

- Also known as: 彩音
- Born: October 9 Saitama, Japan
- Genres: J-pop, anime song, video game songs
- Occupation: Vocals
- Years active: 2004–present
- Label: Mages
- Website: Official website

Ayane (彩音; born October 9) is a female Japanese singer from Saitama Prefecture, who is mainly known for having performed several songs used in video games and anime.

She has performed theme songs for numerous animated works, including Higurashi When They Cry, Kenkō Zenrakei Suieibu Umishō, Ayakashi, 11eyes: Tsumi to Batsu to Aganai no Shōjo, the Memories Off series, and Steins;Gate, among others.

== Biography ==
She studied piano, and began writing lyrics and dancing since early childhood.

In 2004, she released her debut single, entitled "Kizuna", which was used as opening theme for the TV anime series W Wish. Her 2007 single, "Nageki no Mori", which was used as the opening theme of the PlayStation 2 game Higurashi: When They Cry – Matsuri and became her first Top 30 entry on the Oricon charts.

On August 6 2008, Ayane released her second album, Elephant Notes. The album featured fourteen tracks, all of which are theme songs or ending themes from anime and video games. To promote the album, Ayane held campaigns with mini concerts in Tokyo, Nagoya, and Osaka starting late August 2008. A sold-out solo live concert followed on September 28, 2008, at FAB in Omotesando, Tokyo.

In 2009, Ayane celebrated the fifth anniversary of her debut. That year marked a significant milestone as she received recognition at the Bishōjo Game Awards, where her song "Lunatic Tears..."—the opening theme for the PC game 11eyes: Tsumi to Batsu to Aganai no Shōjo-—won the Gold Prize in the Theme Song category. In spring of the same year, she embarked on her first major live tour, titled Ayane Live Tour 2009, covering the three Japanese cities of Tokyo, Nagoya, and Osaka. While she had previously conducted promotional events in these locations, the tour featured her debut solo live performances in Nagoya and Osaka accompanied by a live band. Additionally, this year she was also invited to perform for the first time at the anime song festival Animelo Summer Live 2009, which took place on August 2 at the Saitama Super Arena.

On January 22, 2011, Ayane performed at the live event J-Pop in China 2011 held in Beijing, co-organized by the Japanese Embassy. She appeared alongside R&B singer Jay'ed, marking her first visit to China.

In 2012, Ayane released her single "Cry Out", her first collaboration with Japanese rock band Nagareda Project.

In 2013, Ayane performed the opening theme song "Phenogram" for the video game Steins;Gate: Linear Bounded Phenogram released for PlayStation 3 and Xbox 360. This marked her first time contributing an opening theme to the Science Adventure series. She was subsequently appointed to also perform the opening theme for the Playstation Vita edition of the same game, entitled "Kaikō no Fatalität", and then "Isumo Kono Basho de", which was used as ending theme for the theatrical film Steins;Gate: The Movie − Load Region of Déjà Vu. This year she also launched her first solo-hosted radio program, titled Ayane no Choco-Bana Radio, which began streaming on July 3, 2013, via HiBiKi Radio Station.

In January 2014, Ayane released her fourth studio album, Luminous Flux, marking her first album in approximately three years. To support the album, Ayane embarked on her two-venue tour Ayane Live Tour 2014: Luminous Flux, consisting of two performances: February 15 at Osaka Muse in Osaka, and March 22 at Shinjuku Blaze in Tokyo. On July 30, she released her double A-side titled "Headway! Buccaneers"/"Never Give Up", the first song serving as the opening theme for the pirate-themed game Sōkai Buccaneers!, while the latter served as ending theme for Hyperdimension Neptunia Re;Birth2. On October 8, 2014, Ayane released her tenth anniversary commemorative album Base Ten, for which she included re-arranged versions of previous singles, self-covers, and anime covers. This year she was also invited to numerous international anime-related events, and performed live in Russia, the United States and Taiwan.

In 2015, Ayane collaborated for the first time with fellow singer Kanako Ito on the duet track "Ascension", which was released on March 4 as part of the soundtrack single for the complete edition visual novel Higurashi no Naku Koro ni Iki. She also released her single single "If", which continued her long-standing association with the Steins;Gate franchise., as the title track was selected as the original song for the Japanese slot machine Steins;Gate Kaiten Sekai no Inductance. The single's B-side featured the song "Mirai e no Resolve," which served as the ending theme for the Playstation 4 game Megadimension Neptunia VII.

In November 2016, her 23rd single "Soul Buster" was used as theme song of the Chinese-Japanese co-produced anime of the same name.

In 2019, she celebrated the 15th anniversary with the release of the EP for Dearest, whose leading song was used as theme song for the video game Memories Off: Innocent Fille, and also held her 15th anniversary concert Ayane 15th Anniversary Live -for Dearest- at Club Seata in Kichijoji, Tokyo.

In 2020, Ayane was appointed to perform the ending theme song for the Higurashi: When They Cry – Gou anime. She subsequently also performed the second ending theme of Gou, and the opening theme of the final season Higurashi: When They Cry – Sotsu in 2021.

== Discography ==
Ayane discography
- Studio albums: 5
- Extended plays: 2
- Compilation albums: 3
- Singles: 27

=== Studio albums ===
| Title | Album details | Peak chart positions | Sales |
| Title | Album details | JPN | Sales |
|---|---|---|---|
| Archive Lovers | Released: April 25, 2007; Label: 5pb. Records; Formats: CD, CD+DVD, digital download, streaming | 99 | JPN: 2,600 |
| Elephant Notes | Released: August 6, 2008; Label: 5pb. Records; Formats: CD, digital download | 55 | JPN: 3,400 |
| Lyricallya Candles | Released: December 22, 2010; Label: 5pb. Records; Formats: CD, digital download | 79 | JPN: 2,700 |
| Luminous Flux | Released: January 29, 2014; Label: 5pb. Records; Formats: CD, CD+DVD, digital download | 82 | JPN: 1,100 |
| Life Time | Released: October 9, 2024; Label: Mages; Formats: CD, digital download, streaming | — | |

==== Extended plays ====
| Title | Album details | Peak chart positions | Sales |
| Title | Album details | JPN | Sales |
|---|---|---|---|
| For Dearest | Released: March 27, 2019; Label: 5pb. Records; Formats: CD, digital download, streaming | 142 | JPN: 300 |
| Songs for... Music from Mages Studio | Released: August 31, 2022; Label: Mages; Formats: Digital download, streaming | — | |

==== Compilation albums ====
| Title | Album details | Peak chart positions | Sales |
| Title | Album details | JPN | Sales |
|---|---|---|---|
| Base Ten | Tenth anniversary album; Released: October 8, 2014; Label: 5pb. Records; Formats: CD, digital download, streaming | 132 | JPN: 500 |
| Resilience: Memories Off Best | Compilation of theme songs from the Memories Off series; Released: March 21, 2018; Label: 5pb. Records; Formats: CD | 164 | JPN: 400 |
| Analogy: Ayane Higurashi Song Collection | Compilation of theme songs from the Higurashi When They Cry series; Released: July 28, 2021; Label: Mages; Formats: CD+Blu-ray disc, CD, digital download, streaming | 38 | JPN: 1,500 |

==== Remix albums ====
| Title | Album details | Peak chart positions | Sales |
| Title | Album details | JPN | Sales |
|---|---|---|---|
| Hyper Moe Trance | Released: May 25, 2007; Label: Five Records; Formats: CD | — | |
| Hyper Moe Trance II | Released: July 23, 2009; Label: 5pb. Records; Formats: CD | — | |
| Hyper Dance Remix | Released: December 26, 2012; Label: 5pb. Records; Formats: CD | — | |

=== Singles ===
2000s

List of singles as lead artist
| Title | Year | Peak chart positions | | Sales | Album |
| Title | Year | JPN | JPN Hot 100 (Note: The Billboard Japan Hot 100 chart was established in 2008.) | Sales | Album |
|---|---|---|---|---|---|
| "Kizuna" | 2004 | 95 | | JPN: 2,100 | Elephant Notes |
| "Ribbon" | 2005 | 112 | | JPN: 1,100 | Elephant Notes |
| "Orange" | 2005 | 71 | | JPN: 2,000 | Archive Lovers |
| "Film Makers" | 2006 | 114 | | JPN: 600 | Archive Lovers |
| "Nageki no Mori" | 2007 | 30 | | JPN: 18,100 | Archive Lovers |
| "Dolphin Jet" | 2007 | 78 | | JPN: 2,000 | Elephant Notes |
| "Cloudier Sky" | 2008 | 81 | — | JPN: 2,600 | Elephant Notes |
| "Lunatic Tears..." | 2008 | 68 | — (Note: "Lunatic Tears..." did not enter the Billboard Japan Hot 100, but peaked at number 56 on the Top Singles Sales chart.) | JPN: 4,600 | Elephant Notes |
| "Sono Saki ni Aru, Dareka no Egao no Tame ni" | 2008 | 64 | — | JPN: 3,200 | Lyricallya Candles |
| "Endless Tears..." | 2009 | 25 | — (Note: "Endless Tears..." did not enter the Billboard Japan Hot 100, but peaked at number 42 on the Top Singles Sales chart.) | JPN: 4,800 | Lyricallya Candles |
| "Gravity Error" | 2009 | 60 | — | JPN: 2,000 | Lyricallya Candles |
| "Arrival of Tears" | 2009 | 22 | — (Note: "Arrival of Tears" did not enter the Billboard Japan Hot 100, but peaked at number 26 on the Top Singles Sales chart.) | JPN: 10,900 | Lyricallya Candles |
"—" denotes a recording that did not chart or was not released in that territory.

2010s

List of singles as lead artist
| Title | Year | Peak chart positions | | Sales | Album |
| Title | Year | JPN | JPN Hot 100 | Sales | Album |
|---|---|---|---|---|---|
| "Angelic Bright" | 2010 | 40 | — (Note: "Angelic Bright" did not enter the Billboard Japan Hot 100, but peaked at number 55 on the Top Singles Sales chart.) | JPN: 2,500 | Lyricallya Candles |
| "Jūjika ni Sasagu Septet" | 2010 | 45 | — (Note: "Jūjika ni Sasagu Septet" did not enter the Billboard Japan Hot 100, but peaked at number 55 on the Top Singles Sales chart.) | JPN: 3,300 | Lyricallya Candles |
| "Crest of Knights" | 2011 | 151 | — | JPN: 600 | Luminous Flux |
| "Cry Out" | 2012 | 168 | — | JPN: 300 | Luminous Flux |
| "Itsumo Kono Basho de" | 2013 | 34 | — (Note: "Itsu mo Kono Basho de" did not enter the Billboard Japan Hot 100, but peaked at number 37 on the Top Singles Sales chart, and at number 14 on the Hot Animation chart.) | JPN: 5,500 | Luminous Flux |
| "Phenogram" | 2013 | 54 | — (Note: "Phenogram" did not enter the Billboard Japan Hot 100, but peaked at number 49 on the Top Singles Sales chart.) | JPN: 2,000 | Luminous Flux |
| "Genjutsu no Crossroad" | 2013 | 157 | 74 | JPN: 400 | Luminous Flux |
| "Kaiko no Fatalitat" | 2013 | 170 | — | JPN: 400 | Non-album singles |
| "Headway! Buccaneers" | 2014 | 165 | — | JPN: 300 | Non-album singles |
| "Never Give Up" | 2014 | 165 | — | JPN: 300 | Non-album singles |
| "If" | 2015 | 156 | — | JPN: 300 | Non-album singles |
| "Soul Buster" | 2016 | — | — | | Non-album singles |
| "Resilience" | 2018 | — | — | | Resilience: Memories Off Best |
"—" denotes a recording that did not chart or was not released in that territory.

2020s

List of singles as lead artist
| Title | Year | Peak chart positions | | Sales | Album |
| Title | Year | JPN | JPN Hot 100 | Sales | Album |
|---|---|---|---|---|---|
| "God's Syndrome" | 2020 | 39 | — (Note: "God's Syndrome" did not enter the Billboard Japan Hot 100, but peaked at number 39 on the Top Singles Sales chart, and at number 37 on the Download Songs chart.) | JPN: 1,600 | Analogy: Ayane Higurashi Song Collection |
| "Irregular Entropy" | 2021 | 57 | — (Note: "Irregular Entropy" did not enter the Billboard Japan Hot 100, but peaked at number 57 on the Top Singles Sales chart, and at number 40 on the Download Songs chart.) | JPN: 1,500 | Analogy: Ayane Higurashi Song Collection |
| "Anagram of Coda" | 2022 | 181 | — | JPN: 100 | Life Time |
| "Dream On" | 2023 | 197 | — | JPN: 100 | Life Time |
| "Our Days" | 2024 | — | — | | Life Time |
| "Love Groove" | 2024 | — | — | | Life Time |
| "Tatoeba Kimi ga Kodoku demo" | 2024 | — | — | | Life Time |
| "Not Always True" | 2025 | 53 | — | JPN: 300 | Non-album singles |
| "Unreal Nonfiction" | 2025 | — | — | | Non-album singles |
| "Forever&ever" | 2026 | 108 | — | | Non-album singles |
"—" denotes a recording that did not chart or was not released in that territory.

=== Other appearances ===
List of other appearances, showing other performing artists, year released, and album name
| Title | Year | Other performer(s) | Album/EP |
|---|---|---|---|
| "Eien no Mukō" | 2010 | | Kōrin no Machi, Lavender no Shōjo Theme Song |
| "Ascension" | 2015 | Kanako Itō | Higurashi no Naku Koro ni Sui Theme Song Collection |
| "Hoshizora Orgel" | 2021 | | Since Memories: Off the Starry Sky Theme Song Collection |

=== Other ===
- カカシ (Kakashi) — crystal2 ~Circus Vocal Collection~ Vol.2
- 月と夜空とホウキ星 (Tsuki to Yozora to Houkiboshi) — Yanezutai no Kimi he opening song
- Fractal Tree — PS2 game Que -Fairy of ancient leaf- opening theme
- デコトラ☆愛らんど～伝説の男達～ (Dekotora ☆ Airando ~Densetsu no Otokotachi~) — Wii game Zenkoku Dekotora Matsuri ~Yosakoi Bakusou Onban~ insert song
- After Rain (Live ver.) — THE WORKS Chiyomaru Shikura Gakkyoku Shuu
- 宵闇の月に抱かれて (Yoiyami no Tsuki ni Dakarete) — FAR EAST OF EAST / Tatsh Music Circle Touhou project Arrange CD
- 旋風ノ舞 (Senpuu no Mai) — Wii game Taiko no Tatsujin Wii: Do Don to 2 Daime
- Close Your Eyes (kors k mix) - ULTRA RELOAD Vol.1 feat. AKABEi SOFT2
- Lunatic Tears... (DJ Shimamura Remix) — SUPER SHOT3: Bishōjo Game Remix Collection
- Red Rose Evangel — Arcade game Taiko no Tatsujin playable song
- Purple Rose Fusion - Arcade game Taiko no Tatsujin playable song
- 覚醒 - Fractional Vision (Kakusei - Fractional Vision) - Visual Novel SINCLIENT theme song
- Divine Beast - Hatsukoi 1/1 character theme song
- Re-Start - Aikomyu!! -IDOL Communication- ending theme
- punitive justice～千年の錯綜～ (Sennen no Sakusou) - PC game Shoujo Shin'iki ~ Shoujo Tengoku -The Garden of Fifth Zoa- ending theme
- いつもこの場所で (Symphonic Ver.) (Itsumo Kono Basho de) - STEINS;GATE SYMPHONIC REUNION
- REALIZE (vocals) - Cytus

=== With platoniX ===
- CARRY ON NIGHT (English Version) — "beatmania IIDX 10th Style"
- PLATONIC-XXX — "beatmania IIDX 10th Style"
- Don't be afraid myself — "beatmania IIDX 11: RED"
- Under the Sky (with Sayaka Minami from BeForU) — "beatmania IIDX 12: HAPPY SKY" & "Dance Dance Revolution SuperNOVA 2"
- Xepher (with Yumi Natori) — "beatmania IIDX 12: HAPPY SKY"
- DOUBLE ♥♥ LOVING HEART (with Sayaka Minami from BeForU) — "beatmania IIDX 13: DistorteD"
- CARRY ON NIGHT (Dub's Old Gamers Remix) — "V-RARE SOUNDTRACK 12"
- Don't be afraid myself (trance edge mix) — "V-RARE SOUNDTRACK 14"

=== As Junko Hirata ===
- Xepher (ver1.1) (with Tatsh and Yumi Natori) — "Bemani Top Ranker Ketteisen"
- 月光 (ver0.99) (Gekkou (ver0.99)) — "Bemani Top Ranker Ketteisen"
- Love Again... (with Tatsh) — "beatmania IIDX 11: RED CS"
- With Your Smile (with Shoichiro Hirata) — "beatmania IIDX 14: GOLD"
- 旅立ちの唄 (Tabidachi no Uta) (with Tatsh) — "pop'n music 14 FEVER!"
- Love Again... 'Brand New Life Mix' - Tatsh album MATERIAL
- 旅立ちの唄 'Graduation Mix' - Tatsh album MATERIAL

=== Songs written for other artists ===
- GLORY DAYS (lyrics) — from W Wish, performed by Saeko Chiba
- WONDERLAND (lyrics & composition) — performed by Maria Yamamoto
- MOON PARTY (lyrics & composition) — performed by CoCo☆HONEYMOON (Atsuko Enomoto & Maria Yamamoto)
- LOVE&HISTORY (lyrics & composition) — performed by Maria Yamamoto
- Reijou Doll (lyrics) — PC game Reijou Trader opening theme, performed by Yuuri Nashimoto
- Gekkou (lyrics) — "beatmania IIDX 12: HAPPY SKY" performed by Kanako Hoshino
- Lunatic Tears... (lyrics) — "EXIT TRANCE PRESENTS SPEED ANIME TRANCE BEST ECSTASY" performed by xue
- Next Relation (lyrics) — Xbox 360 game Memories Off 6 Next Relation opening song, performed by Velforest.
