= Gameroom magazine =

US magazine

GameRoom
- Editor: Meredith Hoenes-Buckman
- Former editors: David C. and Donna Cooper; Tim and Jacqueline Ferrante; Kevin Steele
- Categories: Pinball Machines, Jukeboxes, Arcade Video, Slot Machines, Coin-Operated Games
- Frequency: Bi-annually
- Publisher: Nic Parks
- Founder: David Cooper
- First issue: January 1989
- Final issue: August 2019 (Double issue number 7 & 8)
- Country: United States
- Language: English
- ISSN: 1049-3948

GameRoom Magazine is an inactive American magazine focusing on gameroom products (pinball, arcade games, jukeboxes, etc.). It was founded in 1988 by David C. and Donna Cooper of New Albany, Indiana, and was created to serve the growing market of coin-op memorabilia collectors, hobbyists, and restorers. The first issue, dated January 1989, focused on jukeboxes. The magazine also covered other coin-operated playthings, such as pinball machines, slot machines, and gumball machines, in addition to related items such as carousels, gas station memorabilia, and antique ice cream scoops.

== History ==
In 1993 GameRoom absorbed a competing periodical, Pinball Trader. To serve this market, GameRoom increased its pinball machine coverage.

GameRoom was subsequently sold to Tim and Jacqueline Ferrante after the sudden passing of David Cooper in September 1996. After relocating the magazine's homebase to Keyport, New Jersey, and subsequently to Land O Lakes, FL in 2003, the magazine grew to feature regular columnists, more pages, a website online, and a merchandise department.

Coverage of arcade video games began in January 1997 (with an article about Tapper), and in 2001 GameRoom published The Arcade Video Game Price Guide, the world's first comprehensive pricing guide for arcade video games. It was co-authored by Tim Ferrante, Daniel Hower and John Talerico.

The cover of the June 2000 issue was taken on the set of the ABC Television Network's game show, Who Wants to Be a Millionaire?. The editor is seated in the contestant's chair and collector Robert Schles, who was featured in that issue's special Gameroom of the Month article, is seated in host Regis Philbin's chair. Schles was granted use of the set by its production company, he being an ABC-TV employee. It generated a greater response than all prior covers.

In late 2005, after nine and a half years and 110 issues, the Ferrantes sold the magazine to Kevin Steele, best known as the creator of RetroBlast!, a website focusing on the home arcade industry. The first edition under Steele's ownership was the February 2006 issue. Under his direction, GameRoom increased its video game content. It was usually around 64 pages an issue, and full color pages throughout the magazine.

On November 17, 2010, a notice was posted to the magazine's website announcing the magazine was no longer economically feasible to produce and would cease publication immediately. The last issue produced was October 2010 - volume 22 number 10.

In May 2014, The Pinball Company acquired the assets of GameRoom. The company's first edition appeared in August 2015 with a quarterly schedule. It provided more high quality images of new and classic pinball machines and arcades. By January 2017, publisher Nic Parks and editor Meredith Hoenes-Buckman, both of Columbia, MO, had published six editions, and announced the magazine would switch to a "two double issues per year" schedule. Two and half years later, in August 2019, double issue number 7 & 8 was published. It was announced on Facebook, "This is likely the last issue unless we find a new team to produce a high quality issue for us." The August 2019 double issue number 7 & 8 remains the last edition of GameRoom.

== Focus ==
Coverage of pinball games, jukeboxes, arcade video games, and arcade emulation cabinets were frequent topics, as were tips on repairing and restoring these machines. Interviews with game creators and programmers, spotlights on individual collector's home gameroom layouts, reviews of topical books and DVDs, and news items of interest to coin-operated game collectors.
