= Memories Off =

- Series logo
- Genre: Visual novel
- Developers: KID, 5pb.
- Platforms: iPhone OS, Windows, PlayStation, PlayStation 2, PlayStation 3, PlayStation 4, PlayStation Portable, PlayStation Vita, Dreamcast, Xbox 360, Nintendo Switch, WonderSwan Color, Neo Geo Pocket
- First release: Memories Off; September 30, 1999
- Latest release: Memories Off Sousou: Not always true April 10, 2025

Memories Off (Japanese: メモリーズオフ, Hepburn: Memoriizu Ofu) is a series of Japanese romance visual novel video games released by KID. The first game in the series, simply called Memories Off, was released in 1999 for the PlayStation. Memories Off titles have been released on the PC as well as video and handheld gaming consoles such as the PlayStation 2, Dreamcast, WonderSwan Color, and the PlayStation Portable. Several of the series' games' story have been adapted into original video animations, novels, or manga.

With the bankruptcy of KID in 2006, the development of Memories Off #5: Encore was cancelled. It also marked a temporary halt to any development of the game series. However, after Cyberfront took over the brand, development resumed and Memories Off #5: Encore was released on July 12, 2007. However, as of November 30, 2007, 5pb. Games has acquired exclusive rights of the series from Cyberfront and all future development of the series will be handled by 5pb. Games.

== Gameplay ==
The gameplay of Memories Off follows the style of most visual novels; the majority of time spent playing the game is spent on reading through the dialogue or story that appears on screen. Every so often, the game will pause and the player is given a chance to choose from two to five options regarding how he or she wishes to advance the game. The plot will then branch into paths focusing on a single heroine depending on the choices that were made by the player; a conclusive character ending will be presented at the end of any given path. Starting from Memories Off 2nd, all main series games offer the possibility of multiple endings for each of the heroines. Hence, in order to experience the game and all of the main plotlines in their entirety, the player will have to replay the game multiple times and make difference choices to further the plot in alternative directions. Some of the Memories Off games may also contain a hidden "True" plotline that is only made available to the player after all of the other main plotlines are completed.

Voice acting is usually present during all key points of the games, and all main series games from Memories Off 2nd onward have had full voice acting. Environments and objects in game are also generally non-interactive and non-free-roaming, but some background animations have been added to the series, starting with You That Become A Memory ~Memories Off~, in order to enhance the visual experience.

== Games ==
The first installment of the series was released in Japan on September 30, 1999. Subsequent titles were tied together based on the ending of a specific route from the previous installment. Since the game's original release, many Memories Off games have been localized for the Chinese and Korean-speaking markets as well as being ported on multiple video game consoles, handhelds, and the PC. As of June 2013, there are 17 games in the series. This number includes the main series as well as direct prequels and sequels and spin-offs. The first seven games in the main series are planned for release across two collections titled Memories Off Historia Vol. 1 and Vol. 2, with four and three games included respectively, on March 25, 2021, for the Nintendo Switch and PlayStation 4 consoles. All 7 titles were for released on Steam in 2024 as standalone titles, as well as a Memories Off Historia bundle containing all 7 titles.

=== Main series ===
- Memories Off (PS: 1999, PC: 2000, DC: 2000, PS2: 2002, PSP: 2008, iPhone: 2009)
- Memories Off 2nd (PS: 2000, DC: 2001, PC: 2002, PSP: 2008, iPhone: 2010)
- Omoide ni Kawaru Kimi: Memories Off (PS2: 2002, DC: 2002, PC: 2004, PSP: 2008, iPhone: 2010)
- Memories Off: Sorekara (Memories Off ～それから～, Memories Off ~Sorekara~) (PS2: 2004, PC: 2004, PSP: 2008)
- Memories Off 5: Togireta Film (Memories Off #5 とぎれたフィルム, Memories Off #5 Togireta Firumu) (PS2: 2005, PC: 2007, PSP: 2009)
- Memories Off 6: T-wave (PS2: 2008, PSP, 360: 2009, iPhone: 2010, PS3, PSV: 2013)
- Memories Off: Yubikiri no Kioku (360: 2010, PSP: 2011, PS3, PSV: 2013)
- Memories Off: Innocent Fille (PS4, PSV, PC, Switch: 2018)
- Memories Off Sousou: Not always true (PS4, PS5, PC, Switch: 2025)

=== Direct prequels, sequels, and spin-offs ===
- Memories Off Pure (NGP: 2000) – Prequel to Memories Off
- Memories Off Festa (WSC: 2001)
- Memories Off Duet (PS2: 2003, PC: 2008) – A compilation of Memories Off and Memories Off 2nd, includes additional prequel story Memories Off 2nd ～雪蛍～ (Memories Off 2nd ～yukihotaru～)
- Memories Off Mix (PS2: 2003)
- Memories Off After Rain Vol. 1~3 (PS2: 2005, PC: 2008, PSP: 2009) – After stories to Memories Off and Memories Off 2nd.
- Memories Off ~And Then Again~ (Memories Off ～それから again～, Memories Off ~Sorekara again~) (PS2: 2006)
- Memories Off History (PC: 2007)
- Memories Off #5 encore (PS2: 2007, PSP: 2008)
- Your·Memories Off ~Girl's Style (PS2: 2008, PSP: 2009) – The only otome game in the series (targeted at female players)
- Memories Off 6: Next Relation (PS2: 2009, 360: 2009, PSP: 2010, PS3, PSV: 2013) – Sequel to Memories Off 6: T-Wave.
- SINce Memories: Off the Starry Sky (PS4, PC, Switch: 2021) – Spin-off set ten years after the main series.

== OVA adaptations ==
- Memories Off
- Memories Off 2nd
- Memories Off 3.5 To the Distant Memories (Memories Off 3.5 ～想い出の彼方へ～, Memories Off #3.5 Omoide no Kanata e)
- Memories Off 3.5 The Moment of Wishing (Memories Off 3.5 ～祈りの届く刻～, Memories Off #3.5 Inori no Todoku Toki)
- Memories Off #5 The Unfinished film (the animation) (Memories Off #5 とぎれたフィルム the animation, Memories Off #5 Togireta Firumu - The animation)
