= Taxan =

Japanese video game brand

- Trade name: Taxan
- Type: Brand
- Industry: Computer hardware, video games
- Founded: 1981; United Kingdom
- Defunct: 1991
- Headquarters: Bracknell, United Kingdom
- Products: Product list to 1985; List of games
- Parent: Kaga Electronics Co. Ltd

Taxan was a brand of Kaga Electronics Co. Ltd, Tokyo, Japan. It was founded in July 1981. In the late 1980s and early 1990s, the US division published several video games on the NES and Game Boy. The company shut down in 1991 according to former employee Ken Lobb.

== Taxan (UK) Ltd and Taxan (Europe) Ltd ==
On 12 December 1985, Kaga Electronic Company Ltd opened a UK office in Bracknell, Berkshire.

Taxan (UK) Ltd initially sold a range of monochrome and colour monitors for IBM, IBM-compatible and Apple personal computers as well the highly successful KP810 and KP910 dot matrix printers with NLQ printing technology.

The company appointed Northamber plc and P&P Micro Distributors followed by Bytech Peripherals Ltd to sell Taxan products to computer resellers. In addition, Taxan appointed approximately 50 leading resellers who purchased directly from Taxan and were chosen specifically to build the brand in the UK. Taxan also supplied a number of system integrators and OEM customers either under the Taxan brand or original brand. This included Dell Computer Corporation who set up their first UK office in the building next door to Taxan.

Despite considerable success in the dot matrix printer market, Taxan (UK) Ltd made a decision in 1987 to focus on monitors and thus the KP815 and KP915 were the last printers sold in the UK.

By 1987, Taxan became the market leader in the UK and as a result of this position Kaga Electronics decided to transfer all activities for Europe to the UK office, renaming the Company Taxan (Europe) Ltd.

Taxan (Europe) Ltd expanded operations in Europe rapidly, which included opening subsidiary companies and offices in Germany, France, and Sweden. Distributors were appointed throughout Europe and the company enjoyed considerable growth.

In addition to selling computer monitors, the company also sold a range of graphics cards under Taxan brand. This included products designed and manufactured in Japan as well as a highly successful relationship with Paradise System Inc.

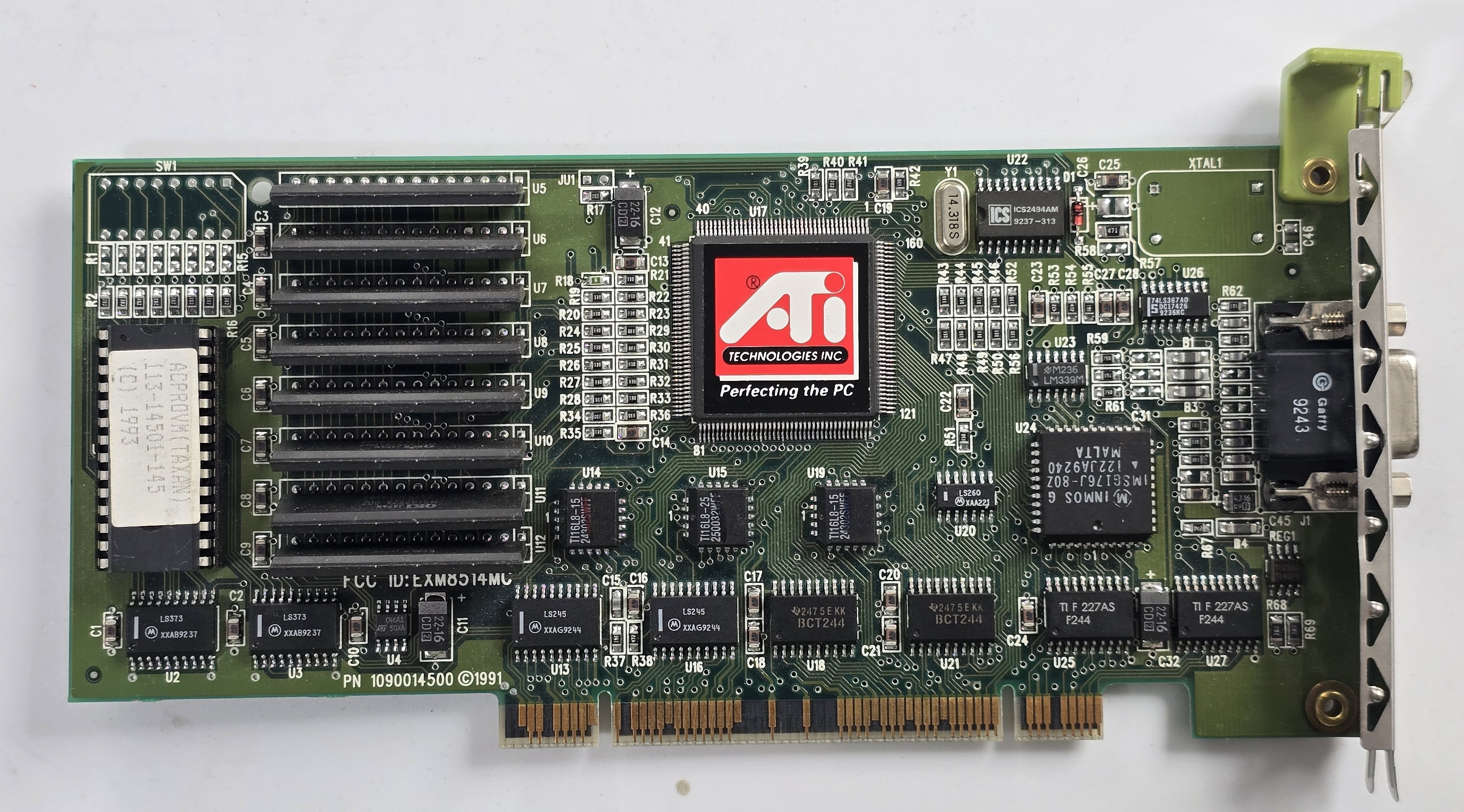
Taxan 8514 Ultra MCA, 8514/A-compatible graphics card featuring the ATI Mach8 from 1992

In 1987, Taxan added the ATI EGA Wonder Graphics adaptor (under the ATI brand) to its product range establishing a strong relationship with the founder of ATI Technologies in Toronto, Canada. This led to Taxan eventually working with ATI on an exclusive basis selling graphics adapters under the Taxan brand and eventually under the ATI brand only.

At its peak, Taxan (Europe) Ltd revenues exceeded $80 million per year.

== Product list to 1985 ==
- KX-12G (Monochrome with either P31 or P39 Green Phosphor)
- KX-12A (Monochrome with Amber Phosphor)
- 12" Vision I (0.63mm Dot Pitch Colour Monitor)
- 12" Vision II (0.51mm Dot Pitch Colour Monitor)
- 12" Vision III (0.38mm Dot Pitch Colour Monitor)
- Supervision II (Colour Monitor)
- Supervision III (Colour Monitor)
- Supervision IVM (Colour Monitor)
- Supervision IV (Colour Monitor)
- KP810, KP815 80 Col Dot Matrix Printer
- KP910, KP915 156 Col Dot Matrix Printer

== List of games ==
Title	Date	Platform
Star Soldier	January 1989	NES
Fist of the North Star	April 1989	NES
Mappy-Land	April 1989	NES
Mystery Quest	April 1989	NES
8 Eyes	January 1990	NES
Burai Fighter	March 1990	NES
Low G Man: The Low Gravity Man	September 1990	NES
Serpent	November 1990	Game Boy
Burai Fighter Deluxe	January 1991	Game Boy
G.I. Joe	January 1991	NES
Magician	February 1991	NES
Putt Master	NR	NES
