= Ayumi Murata =

Japanese singer and actress

Ayumi Murata (村田あゆみ, Murata Ayumi) (born January 12, 1982) is a female Japanese singer and actress from Tokyo, Japan. She has also played the role of Minako Aino in the Sailor Moon musicals from 2001 to 2002.

== Anime voice roles ==
- Happiness! (Opening theme)
- Kappa no Kaikata
- Kenkō Zenrakei Suieibu Umishō (Kaori Himekawa)
- Kono Aozora ni Yakusoku wo (Ending theme)
- Lamune (Ending theme)
- Memories Off 3.5 - Omoide no Kanata e (Ending theme and Kanata Kurosu)
- Myself ; Yourself (Hinako Mochida)
- Academy Wasshoi!

== Visual novel voice roles ==
- Happiness! (Ending Theme)
- Myself ; Yourself (Hinako Mochida and one of the ending themes)
- Memories Off ~sorekara again~ (Opening theme and Kanata Kurosu)
- Omoide ni Kanata Kimi ~Memories Off~ (Kanata Kurosu)

Preceded by Yuki Nakamura	Minako Aino/Sailor Venus in the Sailor Moon musicals, 2001-2002	Succeeded by Mizuki Watanabe
