= Shuten Order =

2025 adventure video game

- Key visual featuring Rei Shimobe (center) and the angels Mikotoru (left) and Himeru (right). In the background is a collage of the ministers. From left to right: Yugen Ushitora, Honoka Kokushikan, Teko Ion, Manji Fushicho, and Kishiru Inugami
- Developers: Too Kyo Games; Neilo
- Publishers: WW: Spike Chunsoft (Note: In North America, physical versions for Nintendo Switch and Nintendo Switch 2 were distributed by PM Studios. In Europe, the physical Switch 2 edition was distributed by Reef Entertainment.); JP: Exnoa
- Directors: Takumi Nakazawa; Hiroaki Shima
- Producer: Junta Inagaki
- Programmer: Toshiki Kikawa
- Artist: Shimadoriru
- Writers: Kazutaka Kodaka; Takumi Nakazawa; Takekuni Kitayama
- Composer: Masafumi Takada
- Platforms: Windows; Nintendo Switch; Nintendo Switch 2
- Release: Windows, Nintendo Switch; September 5, 2025; Nintendo Switch 2 November 27, 2025
- Genres: Adventure, visual novel, multi-genre
- Mode: Single-player

Shuten Order (Note: Known in Japan as Shūten Kyōdan (Japanese: 終天教団; lit. 'End's Heaven Religious Order')) is a 2025 adventure-visual novel and multi-genre video game developed by Too Kyo Games and Neilo, and published by Spike Chunsoft and Exnoa. The story takes place within the city-state of Shuten, governed by the titular religious cult. The protagonist, Rei Shimobe, is a reincarnation of the cult's murdered Founder, revived without memories in a temporary body through the power of God. To permanently resurrect, Rei must clear God's Trial by identifying her murderer among the five ministers of Shuten's government. The game was originally released for Windows and Nintendo Switch on September 5, 2025, and an upgraded version for the Nintendo Switch 2 was released that November.

Shuten Order takes place over five routes, in which Rei investigates each of the ministers. Every route features a different style of gameplay, including point-and-click adventure, dating simulator, and stealth-based horror. A collaboration between Too Kyo and DMM Games (a subsidiary of Exnoa), the game was conceived by Too Kyo's Kazutaka Kodaka, directed by Takumi Nakazawa, and produced by DMM's Junta Inagaki. An omnibus-styled video game, it was designed to showcase the different styles of the adventure game genre. The art director was Shimadoriru, who used vivid colors to create an eeriness against the story's religious themes. The soundtrack was composed by Masafumi Takada.

Upon release, Shuten Order received mixed reviews. Its critical reception and sales stalled due to its English localization, which contained several grammatical errors but was later improved in a patch. While some critics considered the various gameplay styles to be underdeveloped, the game was praised for its concept, story and characters, art direction, soundtrack, and voice cast led by Mitsuki Saiga as Rei.

== Gameplay and setting ==
=== Premise and characters ===
Shuten Order is an adventure and visual novel video game in which the player advances through text to progress the mystery, sci-fi, and dystopian story. The game takes place within the nation of Shuten, a theocratic city-state governed by the titular new religious movement and cult. The cult firmly opposes God and are awaiting the extinction of humanity; countdown clocks to this moment of demise are found around every corner in the city. The player character is Rei Shimobe (Mitsuki Saiga), who awakens without any memories, but is informed by two self-proclaimed angels of God, Himeru (Aoi Yūki) and Mikotoru (Toshiyuki Morikawa), that she is a reincarnation of the Shuten Order's Founder, who was murdered and dismembered during festivities for Shuten's national day. According to the angels, Rei is in a temporary body and must clear God's Trial — identify her killer, acquire a confession, and then kill them herself — if she wants to be permanently revived. Rei can take help from the power of God in her search for the culprit, but she must use it sparingly since it is outlawed by the doctrines of the Shuten Order.

The suspects for the Founder's murder are the five ministers of Shuten, who Rei has to investigate over the following days. The suspects are: Minister of Justice Kishiru Inugami (Daisuke Ono), a spontaneous free spirit and drug addict but an exceptional mediator; Minister of Health Yugen Ushitora (Yūki Ono), a highly skilled doctor and seemingly deeply compassionate, but pathologically meticulous; Minister of Science Teko Ion (Ayumu Murase), a charmless genius with immeasurable IQ and the designer of most technology in Shuten; Minister of Education Honoka Kokushikan (Inori Minase), a mysterious and quiet masked girl who controls and manipulates the country's spread of information; and Minister of Security Manji Fushicho (Shizuka Itō), a short tempered and aggressive public servant who mercilessly hunts down dissenters of the Shuten Order. Each minister was given possession of one of the Founder's dismembered body parts, with the exception of the torso, which went missing after the murder and is believed to be secretly possessed by the culprit.

After the prologue, Shuten Order diverges into multi-genre gameplay. The player is given the option to choose which one of the five suspects to pursue; this choice determines the route, and each route features a different style of gameplay. All of the routes need to be cleared to reach the game's ending, but the order is determined by the player. Clues on the Founder's murder are stored in a list accessible to the player at all times.

=== Routes ===
Gameplay examples

Each route in Shuten Order features different gameplay. In the Ministry of Justice route, the player investigates areas to solve a murder. Dialogue in green can be selected and acquired as evidence.

The Ministry of Security route is played from a top-down perspective in 3D environments while escaping a serial killer's line of sight.

In the Ministry of Justice route, Rei accompanies Inugami to an island manor for the reading of a wealthy businessman's will. When a beneficiary to the will ends up killed and the collapse of a bridge leaves the island isolated, Rei cooperates with Inugami to solve the murder. During investigations, the player must search areas and gather testimonies from other characters in a point-and-click manner. In response to certain highlighted words during dialogue, the player can snap Rei's fingers to acquire the statement as evidence. Investigations culminate in meetings, where the player will refute false statements and select evidence in response to prompts in order to solve the case. Rei has a meter for trustworthiness, which will deplete if the player finger snaps on the wrong statement during investigations or if they select the wrong option during meetings. The trustworthiness bar reaching zero will end Rei's investigation, causing a game over.

In the Ministry of Health route, Rei, Ushitora, and other affiliates of the ministry are kidnapped and forced into a series of competitive death games. The player controls Rei from a first-person perspective in three-dimensional environments and must navigate the labyrinth-esque facility where the characters are captured. Navigation will be hindered by locked doors, which must be opened by solving pentomino, connect-the-dots, and sliding puzzles. On occasion, the player must also make decisions on negotiating with other participants to survive the death game; making the wrong choice results in a game over, after which the player is sent back to remake their decision. The route features the constant livestreaming overlay of a VTuber, the death game's mastermind, who commentates on Rei's actions and on occasion gives hints to survival.

The Ministry of Education route takes the appearance of a school life dating sim. Rei is poisoned by Kokushikan and has to travel to an academy, identify which of the three students there is actually Kokushikan in disguise, and then seduce her to be given the antidote. During the day, the player has a limited number of turns to navigate the school using a map, in search for their romantic interest and to increase their relationship points. At night, Rei meets with the girl to confess her feelings, and the player has to choose dialogue options within a limited timeframe for Rei to confess. Since the player has to engage with all three girls in a pre-determined order, Rei ends up multi-timing. The player has to diffuse the "bombs" of previous love interests by spending some of the turns to meet with them and lowering their suspicions.

In the stealth-based horror Ministry of Security route, Rei teams up with Fushicho to investigate Nephilim, a costumed serial killer in Shuten, who gouges out the eyes of his victims using a jackhammer. In between visual novel-styled dialogue with Fushicho, the player controls Rei from a top-down perspective in various levels while avoiding Nephilim. To reach the goal in each level, the player has to clear various objectives, such as pipe puzzles or placing weighted objects on pressure plates. If caught within his line of sight, Nephilim will begin to chase Rei and cause a game over upon contact. Utilities throughout the stages can be used to escape; security shutters can slow Nephilim down, and lockers can be used to hide.

The Ministry of Science route takes place within Teko's underground research lab, which gets attacked by terrorists. Rei is forced to team up with Teko to save Shuten from the threat posed if the terrorists are to reach the bottom floor of the facility. Within entirely text-based gameplay, the player controls the perspectives of multiple characters, including Rei and Teko. Each character has a flowchart that branches off based upon the player's choices. Incorrect choices will lead to a game over or dead end, either for the character in question or another; in such cases, the player must navigate the flowchart to alter the choice of the correct character.

== Plot ==
An amnesic young woman awakens in a hotel room and is greeted by Himeru and Mikotoru, two self-proclaimed "angels", who give her the name Rei Shimobe and task her with God's Trial. Over the next three days, Rei sets out to identify her killer among the five ministers of Shuten so that she may achieve full resurrection. Throughout her investigations, Rei learns several truths about the Shuten Order. Its citizens, and Rei herself, are in fact droids, the "God" detested by the cult actually refers to the droids' human creators, and the power of God used by Rei is in reality computer hacking. In each route, Rei fails to identify the culprit and meets her own death instead, only to awaken once again in the hotel room at the start of the same four-day period, without recollection of the preceding events.

After dying in every route, Rei awakens on the fourth day and retains the memories from all of her investigations. Rei and the ministers gather in the Shuten Order's main office for an assembly conference surrounding the Founder's murder, where Rei correctly surmises the culprit as Manji Fushicho, who runs away when cornered. Rei and Kishiru Inugami track her down to the hotel where Rei awakened, only to find that every guest room contains an exact copy of Rei still asleep. Fushicho appears and explains that Rei/the Founder is a special hive-type droid who is revived upon dying by having her memory transferred into another body; the hotel, Fushicho explains, is where these spare bodies are stored. It is revealed that the five routes were not timeloops, but rather five of Rei's bodies activating simultaneously.

Within Rei's subconscious, she meets with the fading personality of her past self as the Founder, who explains the background to the Shuten Order. Several decades ago, humans constructed factories capable of mass-producing hyper intelligent and humanistic droids, who became ubiquitous as tools and servants. Later, a mass extinction event caused all lifeforms on Earth to lose their reproductive capabilities; a war subsequently broke out amongst humans, and droids were sent out to fight on the battlefields. Rei (SMB Type-0) was a hive-type fighter droid created for this war. Amongst growing anti-droid sentiment, Dr. Mikoto, the scientist who developed Type-0, was instructed to create an Elimination Code capable of factory resetting all droids; however, due to his moral qualms about having sent out droids to suffer and die in war, he also created a second Elimination Code that would grant droids freedom by removing the code preventing them from attacking humans. Type-0 was entrusted both Elimination Codes but was unable to pick between saving humans or droids. Instead, she used neither and created the land of Shuten as a safe haven for droids, while safeguarding the codes in her torso, to protect both humans and droids.

Shortly before the events of the game, the Founder was infected by a malware program created by the few remaining humans with the goal of retrieving the Elimination Codes. To prevent this, the Founder asked Fushicho to kill her and safeguard the codes. Upon the Founder's revival in a spare body, her memories were erased by the angels — embodiments of the malware program — who then used the amnesic Founder/Rei as a vessel to retrieve the Elimination Codes. Back in the present, Rei teams up with the five ministers to fight the angels, but their battle ends in a stalemate when the angels seize complete control over Rei's last body and threaten to destroy it. The player is then presented the choice to either save humanity, or to save the droids:

- If the player chooses to save the droids, Rei refuses to input the code and commits suicide to kill the angels along with her. A year later peace has returned to Shuten, and Rei is shown to have survived thanks to the ministers salvaging spare parts from her other bodies. She and Fushicho set out into the destroyed world outside of Shuten to search for any human survivors to save.
- If the player chooses to save humanity, Rei uses the Elimination Code to reset the droids, while promising to the ministers that they will never forget each other. Decades later, humans have moved into Shuten and the outside world is slowly healing thanks to the efforts of the droids, who are once again working for humans. Rei awakens in an abandoned factory and steps outside to find a young girl, the first newborn human in years. They travel back to Shuten, where the five former ministers await them. Seeing them triggers Rei's memories and she weeps in relief at being reunited with her friends.

== Development ==
Too Kyo Games co-founder Kazutaka Kodaka, otherwise known for the Danganronpa series, conceived of Shuten Order while planning the game Death Come True (2020), shortly after the cancelation of a project that would later become the predecessor to their 2025 title The Hundred Line: Last Defense Academy. The cancelation of The Hundred Line's predecessor gave Kodaka time to plan out Shuten Order, which he intended to pursue as an indie game within Too Kyo, but was forced to place the project on hold when Hundred Line re-entered development. He planned to resume the game when Hundred Line was completed; however, coincidentally around the same time, he acquainted with Junta Inagaki, the producer of DMM Games. They discussed creating a title together, so Kodaka presented the decently developed plot of Shuten Order during a meeting between the two companies. DMM, who were looking to expand their business with an original IP, agreed to partner with Too Kyo for the title.

Since he and many members of Too Kyo would be pre-occupied with Hundred Line, Kodaka took on a supervising and advisory role for Shuten Order while entrusting creative direction to Takumi Nakazawa. Nakazawa was also on the staff team for Hundred Line, but dropped out to prioritize Shuten Order when it entered full-scale production. After its completion, the Shuten Order team at Too Kyo were reunited with the rest of the company on finishing Hundred Line.

=== Writing and characters ===
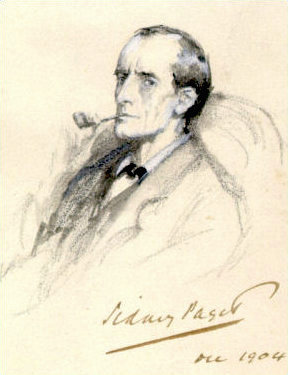
The writing of Shuten's ministers was left to the writer of their respective route, but some elements of their characterizations were decided early on. For example, Minister of Justice Kishiru Inugami was based on Sherlock Holmes (1904 depiction by Sidney Paget pictured) to fulfill a detective role in his mystery adventure route.

Shuten Order's thematic focus on religion and murder by dismemberment formed Kodaka's original concept for the story since its early stages. Inspired by games such as Hayarigami: Keishichō Kaii Jiken File (2004), he had long wished to write an occult mystery story, which translated into the religious themes in Shuten Order. By creating a fictional religion, the focal cult could have unique values, rules, and a worldview detached from the real-world. The idea of "unusual incidents", set within such a world where common sense does not apply, was one of Kodaka's concepts for the story's premise.

Nakazawa was uninvolved in forming the overarching plot of Shuten Order, which had already been planned out by Kodaka when the game entered development. Nakazawa's role as director instead entailed overall supervision of the project, including quality control and ensuring that the game matched Kodaka's original vision. The scenario was a collaboration between various writers, whose work was divided across the routes. Principally, they included Nakazawa and Kodaka, who also served as scenario supervisors, and Takekuni Kitayama, a mystery novelist who previously wrote Danganronpa: Kirigiri (2013–2020) and worked on the murder mechanisms in Danganronpa V3: Killing Harmony (2017) and Master Detective Archives: Rain Code (2023). Kitayama planned how the Founder's murder would be solved, with additional contributions to multiple routes. Other contributors to specific routes included Yōichirō Koizumi, Kyohei Oyama, and Yasuyuki Mochida.

Before the writing of the routes, Shuten's ministers had already been developed to some extent. Kitayama received a document with bullet points about each minister, which he used to write their introduction in the game's prologue. Thereafter, further development of their characterizations was left to the writer of their respective route. Some characters were influenced by the genre of their route; for example, the Ministry of Justice route had been broadly designated as mystery adventure, which led Kishiru Inugami to be written to fit a detective role, inspired by Sherlock Holmes. Candidates for the voice cast were shortlisted by DMM, who prioritized industry veterans due to the large amount of voiced dialogue required.

The protagonist, Rei Shimobe/the Founder, went through various changes to her characterization during development. Rei is female, a fact that is revealed to the player but is not known to several other characters, which becomes a key plot point in solving the Founder's murder. (Note: In Shuten, the Founder's gender is kept a mystery to the public to protect a more "charismatic" image, but most characters assume she is male. In the final chapter, it is revealed that the Founder's murderer would have known her true gender, which is used in the climactic process of elimination to determine the culprit.) One idea during early development was for Rei's gender to be held secretive even to the player, which inspired a more masculine and androgynous character design. The idea was ultimately scrapped due to difficulties faced in both writing and design; Rei was subsequently redesigned with more feminine body lines, but elements of her androgynous characteristics were kept in the writing. Another part of Rei's design is her mask, a standard fashion accessory in Shuten which conveniently allows her to disguise her identity as the Founder. During development, Rei's mask proved to be the most drawn out part of the character design process, with over one hundred suggested variations during the concept art stage. According to Nakazawa, Rei's amnesia — a common trait of protagonists in Kodaka's works — put her in the same position as the player: thrown into a world without any prior knowledge and gradually learning the truth of the Shuten Order.

In Kodaka's original plot outline, the role of the angels was occupied by only one character, but this was changed to two in early development to prevent overlap with the premise of a prior Too Kyo title, Master Detective Archives: Rain Code. (Note: In Rain Code, the player character is an amnesic detective who is guided by a shinigami god of death.) The developers spent time experimenting with different dynamics for the pair. One earlier idea was for the angels to be in respective sadist and masochist roles, but their final design sees Himeru as a young girl and Mikotoru as a dandy mister.

=== Game design ===
[Shuten Order] is influenced by every visual novel I have ever loved [...] a culmination of all the visual novels I've ever read.

— Kazutaka Kodaka, Nintendo Life interview (August 2025)

Kodaka wanted to create an omnibus-styled video game, which inspired the Founder's murder by dismemberment; since he wanted the story to take place over five routes, a murder by dismemberment would allow for the designation of a body part to each path. Kodaka wanted every route to have a different atmosphere, which expanded into the idea that each route should also have a different style of gameplay. Conceived as a title that would allow players to experience the various styles of the adventure game genre, Kodaka described Shuten Order as "a culmination" of all visual novels he had played, and said he had "poured all of [his] love" for the genre into the project. Among others, influences included 428: Shibuya Scramble (2008) on the Ministry of Science route and the Clock Tower series on the Ministry of Security route. According to the interpretation of game reviewers, the Ministry of Justice route was based on Ace Attorney, while the Ministry of Education route borrows its interface style and bomb-clock system from Tokimeki Memorial. In a Gematsu interview, Kodaka gave an extended list of influences, which also included Cross Tantei Monogatari (1998), Machi (1998), Princess Tomato in the Salad Kingdom (1994), Cross Channel (2003), The Portopia Serial Murder Case (1983), the Zero Escape series, Ever 17: The Out of Infinity (2002), Higurashi When They Cry (2002), and Saya no Uta: The Song of Saya (2003).

While Too Kyo Games were credited as the creative developer of Shuten Order, the development of gameplay was handled by the studio Neilo. They included director Hiroaki Shima and lead programmer Toshiki Kikawa, who led multiple teams specialized to the different genres of each route. Nakazawa explained that developing "completely different game systems, scenarios with varying tones, and distinct UI designs all within one game" proved to be a significant challenge that required "frequent mental shifts", and that Neilo "probably put in even more effort and faced greater difficulties" than he had. One consideration during development was difficulty. Nakazawa remarked that they had no intention of creating a challenging game, since the story was the main focus and gameplay was primarily meant to improve immersion. A difficulty too great, he thought, would only hinder the player's engagement with the story. Their goal was to find a middle ground difficult enough to remain engaging, but easy enough for any resilient player to be able to progress.

The ideas for each route had been established since the start of development. The only one to undergo fundamental changes to its genre was the Ministry of Science route, which had been considered for escape room and tower defense gameplay in earlier development. The most difficult to develop was the stealth action Ministry of Security route, which took multiple months of development and debugging on its level design and game balance before it was finalized. The developers foresaw these issues and began developing the Security route first; regardless, it was the last one completed. Inagaki commented that it would have been a "disaster" had it been left until the end.

=== Art direction and music ===
Artwork of the city of Shuten. The game was designed to feel familiar but somehow otherworldly.

Illustrator Shimadoriru served as both art director and character designer on Shuten Order. On choosing him over Too Kyo's other illustrator, Rui Komatsuzaki, Kodaka said they wanted Shimadoriru's more vibrant and colorful art style to contrast the impression most players would have about the religious themes. Shuten Order would also require designing a country from scratch; since Shimadoriru had prior experience as an environment artist, he was considered well-fit for the job.

Shuten Order's different style to Too Kyo's past titles compelled Shimadoriru to create a large variety concept art, with the goal to provide Kodaka and the team with a wide range of possibilities. One of Shimadoriru's earliest design concepts was reminiscent to a Japanese countryside town, with rice fields and Buddhist statues, which the team spent time developing into a more urban setting with a balance between retro and high-tech. According to Kodaka, the art direction was influenced by the Japanese artists Tadanori Yokoo and Tarō Okamoto, and the city of Shuten was intended to feel "slightly off", in a way similar to the atmosphere produced by AI-generated imagery. Shimadoriru said that "While vivid colors usually give a bright, pop impression, they can also create a sudden sense of eeriness and otherworldliness"; in this sense, the artsyle was intended to "bring out a sense of mystery and intrigue" and balance the dark themes of the story. He favored softer pastel colors for the background environments, whereas the characters were given "vivid and bright" color patterns to stand out in contrast.

The sound director on Shuten Order was Too Kyo Games' composer Masafumi Takada, who worked on the game simultaneously to Hundred Line under a tight schedule. Takada began by writing several musical motifs, which were reused across multiple routes but given different arrangements to fit with the respective genre. His primary goal was to create a unified sense of the Shuten Order's culture, where players would feel as though they were always within the same country even across different scenes. As such, by reusing motifs, he believed "the soundtrack transforms with each route" while still allowing for "the world of Shuten Order [to linger] like a scent". Although this proved to be his biggest challenge, Takada considered the game relatively easy to compose for. He found that writing multiple styles of music — such as switching from working on a dating sim song to a horror game song — allowed him to exercise his mind and not run out of ideas.

== Release ==
Too Kyo and DMM Games announced Shuten Order with a teaser trailer on May 16, 2025, but omitted information such as its genre and release date. A more detailed, official announcement trailer was released on May 22 and unveiled the game's release date, the five routes and their premises, and story details. The marketing highlighted the multiple sub-genres; an English press release described the game as a "gripping, multi-genre experience". Individual trailers were also released detailing various characters, including Rei, the angels, and the five ministers. In Japan, VTubers Usada Pekora and Takane Lui were given pre-release copies to premiere the game's prologue on their livestreams. Nano, a Japanese-American singer, performed the original song "Antagonist" in the game's final trailer, released on August 25. The song was issued for music platforms on the day of the game's release.

Shuten Order was released worldwide on September 5, 2025, for Nintendo Switch, and on Windows computers via Steam and DMM's own distribution platform. The game was published in Japan by Exnoa, the parent company of DMM Games, and in Europe and North America by Spike Chunsoft, the former employer of Kodaka and others before their founding of Too Kyo Games. (Note: On Steam, the game is published by both Spike Chunsoft and Exnoa.) It was Too Kyo's third title of 2025, following Tribe Nine and Hundred Line; many game journalists commented on the speed of their releases, especially after the large scale of Hundred Line. (Note: The Hundred Line, which features a hundred different endings, was described by Kotaku in their year-end list as one of the most ambitious games of the visual novel genre. In an interview with Famitsu, Kodaka had joked that Hundred Line numbed their sense of scale when writing the five routes of Shuten Order.) A special "Ministry Edition" of Shuten Order, sold by Spike Chunsoft through their U.S. store, came with a Steam voucher, sticker sheet, and clear paper file. A "Deluxe Edition" released in Japan was bundled with the Switch game, an artbook, a mini soundtrack, and snow globe. The artbook and mini soundtrack were also sold via a "Digital Deluxe Edition", and pre-orders of all editions included a digital novella written by Kodaka, Before the Murders — Case: Manji Fushicho, which explores Fushicho's backstory.

Upon release, Shuten Order's English localization contained numerous errors and mistranslations such as typos, punctuation mistakes, misattribution of the speaking character, and instances of dialogue misaligning with text bubbles. A reviewer for Anime News Network noted "sentence fragments, redundant language, clunky phrasing [...] name an issue common to Japanese to English localizations, and it's there." A recurring issue in the English script was improper usage of pronouns, such as the swapping of "you" and "I", and characters interchangeably using both male and female pronouns. This and other issues, such as the lack of cloud functionality and a mistake on the Chinese storefront where the game was priced higher than intended, resulted in Shuten Order receiving "mixed" user reviews on Steam a day after release. The developers issued an apology for the Chinese pricing mistake and later released a patch on September 19 to fix part of the translation issues. The pronoun mistakes, particularly in regards to the Ministry of Health route, had led some English players to assume the game's writing was an intentional depiction of transphobia, which Nakazawa denied in an X post.

An upgraded version of Shuten Order for the Nintendo Switch 2, featuring a higher frame rate, enhanced visuals, and support for Joy-Con 2 mouse controls, was released on November 27, 2025. It was sold as a standalone title for new players and as a cheaper "Upgrade Pack" for those who already owned the Switch 1 version. A physical version for the Switch 2, distributed by Reef Entertainment, was released in Europe on April 23, 2026; the North American physical release, distributed by PM Studios, was delayed from the same date due to "ongoing global shipping disruptions", and was instead released on April 30 for both Nintendo Switch and Nintendo Switch 2.

== Reception ==
Reception

Aggregate scores
Aggregator	Score
Metacritic	69/100 (Switch); 78/100 (PC)
OpenCritic	75% recommend

Review scores
Publication	Score
Famitsu	9/10, 8/10, 9/10, 8/10
GamesRadar+	3/5
Hardcore Gamer	4.5/5
Nintendo Life	6/10
Nintendo World Report	2/10
Shacknews	7/10
RPG Site	7/10
Siliconera	7/10

According to aggregator OpenCritic, Shuten Order was recommended by 75% of 53 professional reviewers. Rival aggregator Metacritic describes reception as "mixed to average" on Nintendo Switch and "generally positive" on PC, based on weighted averages of critic scores. Out of 20 reviews on Switch, 12 were positive, 7 were mixed, and 1 was negative. According to Caitlin Moore for Anime News Network, critical reception and sales of the game stalled due to its initial localization issues. In an amendment to her original review after the release of the translation patch, she wrote:

Shuten Order was highly praised by critics, but most of us pointed out the issues with the English text, whether specifically pointing to the pronoun issues or a more general discussion of the inaccuracies and grammar mistakes. These criticisms are also reflected in player reviews and community discussions; currently, the game has "Mixed" reviews on Steam, with many citing the translation as the reason not to recommend it. Within my personal circles, people who would ordinarily pick up any game with Kodaka's name on it have chosen to wait to buy it. A cheap, rushed, machine-driven translation hurts game sales. It makes it impossible for international players to understand the message the creators were trying to convey, and I'm glad the publishers are changing course to provide players with an accurate, quality release.

Barring the English translation, many critics praised the game's story and writing. In a review for Hardcore Gamer, Ivanir Ignacchitti found the immersion-breaking lack of script polish to be "a shame", since Shuten Order would have otherwise been "a perfect experience" demonstrating Too Kyo's "mastery [...] over text adventures" and their ability to write engaging stories. Similarly, Siliconera's Stephanie Liu wrote that the translation issues stood to hinder the game's "innate quality". Praise was directed towards the cast of characters, which Checkpoint Gaming reviewer Bree considered to be "Shuten Order's strong point". Lucas White at Shacknews described the route system as successful in allowing each character ample development, solving what he considered a typical issue in Kodaka's works of characters failing to amount to more than their "central gimmick". A similar sentiment was shared by Denfaminico Gamer's Amsa, who wrote that, by spending time with a minister throughout their route, the character becomes increasingly likeable: "It's ironic; even though you selected them as the [suspect to investigate] at the start of the game, you get to know them and eventually you're wishing, 'I hope they're not the culprit'."

For many reviewers, Shuten Order's multiple styles of gameplay was a weak point. Nintendo Life's Ollie Reynolds and Nintendo World Report's Melanie Zawodniak both called the game a Jack of all trades. Zawodniak found the game's marketing as a five-in-one adventure game to be "wishful thinking at best" when it is, in reality, mostly "a simple visual novel that occasionally dips into poorly thought out and underdeveloped copies of some other game that's much more worth your time." Oscar Taylor-Kent of GamesRadar+ liked some routes, but contended that others were not "made equal". Similarly, Pascal Tekaia at Adventure Game Hotspot complimented the game for its new take on the "walls of text" visual novel formula, but wrote that the gameplay of some routes would fail to appeal to all players. Regardless, several critics considered the game's concept ambitious. Yōnashi at Gamer called Shuten Order an "innovative" work that challenges the limits of adventure games. GamesRadar+ described it as a "cross-genre celebration" of mystery games, even if it required more merit to be "worth celebrating on its own".

The art direction received wide praise, especially for its use of bright colors. Nintendo Life praised the contrast of "striking blues, yellows, and pinks" against the agonizing themes of the story, and Checkpoint Gaming wrote that the bright style created a setting that feels "both alien and alive at the same time". Critics described the dialogue interface as akin to comic panels; others also made stylistic comparisons to the action role-playing game The World Ends with You (2007) and the animations of Studio Trigger. The character designs were also praised; Majkol Robuschi for UK Anime Network wrote that "designs pop with fluorescent, vibrant colors and diverse physiques, resulting in a cast of memorable and charismatic characters." The music was well acclaimed and drew comparisons to Takada's past work, such as Danganronpa. Cullen Black for RPG Site called the music "equally fantastic" to the art style. Adventure Game Hotspot classified the soundtrack as "decent to good" and a "a credit to Shuten Order" that it failed to grow repetitive over the game's lengthy play time. The Japanese voice acting was also well received, particularly for Mitsuki Saiga's lead role as Rei Shimobe.

== See also ==
- List of fictional religions
- Doomsday cult
- Three Laws of Robotics
- Infinity, a sci-fi visual novel series directed by Nakazawa
