= Myself ; Yourself =

2007 Japanese visual novel and anime series

- Myself ; Yourself limited edition visual novel cover featuring Nanaka Yatsushiro.

マイセルフ；ユアセルフ (Maiserufu ; Yuaserufu)
- Light novel

Myself ; Yourself Sorezore Overture
- Written by: Takumi Nakazawa
- Illustrated by: Wadapen
- Published by: MediaWorks
- Magazine: Dengeki G's Magazine
- Original run: March 30, 2007 – November 30, 2007
- Volumes: 6 chapters
- Anime television series
- Directed by: Tetsuaki Matsuda (Chief); Yasuhiro Kuroda (Note: Credited as "QZo", a pseudonym.)
- Produced by: Mariko Kusuhara; Makoto Itō; Michiko Koyanagi; Tetsuko Kotani
- Written by: Gō Zappa
- Music by: 5zizz (Note: Collaboration between game company 5pb. and musician group ZIZZ Studio.); Chiyomaru Shikura
- Studio: Doga Kobo
- Licensed by: NA: Maiden Japan
- Original network: TV Kanagawa, CTC, TV Saitama, TV Aichi, TVO, AT-X
- Original run: October 3, 2007 – December 26, 2007
- Episodes: 13
- Video game
- Developer: Regista; Chiyomaru Shikura (Composer and Sound Producer)
- Publisher: Yeti
- Genre: Visual novel
- Platform: PlayStation 2
- Released: December 20, 2007
- Video game

Myself ; Yourself: Sorezore no Finale
- Developer: Regista
- Publisher: Yeti
- Genre: Visual novel
- Platform: PlayStation 2
- Released: May 28, 2009

Myself ; Yourself (マイセルフ；ユアセルフ, Maiserufu ; Yuaserufu) (Note: The title is also officially rendered Myself;Yourself, without spaces before or after the semicolon.) is a Japanese visual novel developed by Regista which was released on December 20, 2007, for the PlayStation 2. Takumi Nakazawa, the main scenario writer for the Infinity series (Ever17, Remember11), is the principal writer for Myself ; Yourself. Character design for the game is provided by Mutsumi Sasaki, who also produced the original character design for Memories Off, Happy Lesson, and Futakoi. Before the game's release, a light novel based on the story, written by Takumi Nakazawa, and illustrated by Wadapen, was serialized in the Japanese bishōjo magazine Dengeki G's Magazine between March and November 2007, published by MediaWorks.

A 13-episode anime television series adaptation by Doga Kobo, the first for the studio, aired in Japan from October to December 2007 on TV Kanagawa. A spin-off sequel to the visual novel was developed by the previous staff entitled Myself ; Yourself: Sorezore no Finale and was released on May 28, 2009, for the PlayStation 2.

== Plot ==
Myself ; Yourself is set in 2007 in the fictional town Sakuranomori (桜乃杜) in W Prefecture which is modeled after Wakayama Prefecture, Japan. The town is in a quiet, rural area on the southern tip of the prefecture and borders the Pacific Ocean. Sakuranomori is the birthplace of Sana Hidaka, a sixteen-year-old high school student, who grew up with his childhood friends Nanaka Yatsushiro & Aoi Oribe, his best friend Shusuke Wakatsuki, and Shusuke's fraternal twin sister Shuri Wakatsuki. Sana left Sakuranomori when he was eleven years old, but returns five years later living on his own in the apartment building Aoi's family runs. Sana soon finds out that while some things have stayed the same, there are still just as many things that have changed.

== Characters ==
=== Protagonists ===
Sana Hidaka (日高 佐菜, Hidaka Sana; born October 13, 1991)
Voiced by: Shinnosuke Tachibana (regular), Madoka Kimura (childhood)
Sana is the main protagonist of the series. He left Sakuranomori during his childhood, and during the beginning of the series he comes back to live by himself in the apartment building owned by Aoi's parents. He apparently had a crush on Nanaka before he left and still holds those feelings for her. He used to play the piano, but he forgot every song except the song Nanaka wrote for him which he says is very important to him. He has a fear of blood because he tried to commit suicide during his middle-school years due to constantly being bullied. At the end of the anime series, Sana proposes to Nanaka and she accepts by wearing the proposal ring during her concert.

In the game, his default romantic partner is Nanaka Yatsushiro, as shown in "Sorezore no Finale".

Shusuke Wakatsuki (若月 修輔, Wakatsuki Shūsuke; born March 23, 1991)
Voiced by: Takehito Koyasu (regular), Yūko Sanpei (childhood)
Shūsuke is one of the four childhood friends Sana left behind when he moved, and they renew their friendship on his return. He is Sana's best friend and the only male besides Sana in their circle. He is the younger twin of Shuri Wakatsuki. Yuzuki-sensei refers him as the lucky one of the Wakatsuki twins. When he and Shuri are accused of being lovers, their father decides to send Shuri away to London. When Shuri tells Shūsuke that she cannot stand to be separated from him, they decide to run away together knowing people will think that they have eloped.
In the game, his default romantic partner is Asami Hoshino, as shown in "Sorezore no Finale". However, in the first game, if Sana takes Shuri's route, Shūsuke will admit that he has romantic feelings for his sister. Even though Shūsuke has these feelings, if playing the game as Shūsuke, there is no Shuri route.

=== Heroines ===
Nanaka Yatsushiro (八代 菜々香, Yatsushiro Nanaka; born July 29, 1991)
Voiced by: Ami Koshimizu
Nanaka is one of Sana's childhood friends and seemed to have feelings for Sana. When Sana returns to town after five years, her personality has changed from sweet and caring to a cold and moody demeanor. On meeting again she slaps him, apparently for not recognizing her. In the anime, it is also explained that they had agreed to send letters to one another and that Sana had neglected to do so, while Nanaka had stuffed their mailbox with countless letters begging for help. This may have also provided motivation for the slap. She still seems to have romantic feelings for him as she gets jealous whenever Sana is with another girl (especially Asami).

Nanaka was a victim of a possible arson shortly after Sana left Sakuranomori, and lost both of her parents in the fire. She managed to escape with only her violin (which she stopped playing and kept only as a memento) and the sakura bracelet that Sana had given her. She claims not to remember anything of the events of that night. Her uncle and aunt took her in and made efforts to ensure that she didn't try to remember to spare her further pain. Events after Sana's return, however, start triggering buried memories and she comes to remember everything. Her father was unable to cope with the knowledge that her mother had been unfaithful to him with their very close friend a short time prior to their marriage. As a result, Nanaka's father immolated himself and his wife after knocking her senseless when she confirmed that Nanaka was in fact the result of the tryst and not his daughter after all, something that Nanaka's uncle had always suspected. (Nanaka's biological father was also her violin teacher.) Unable to cope with the burden of her returned memories, Nanaka attempts suicide but is discovered in time by Sana, who overcomes his fear of blood to save her. In the last episode of the anime, Sana proposes to her and she accepts.

In the game, her default romantic partner is Sana, as shown in "Sorezore no Finale". It is also revealed that she and Asami Hoshino are cousins, which surprises Hinako at first. She later comments that she knew there was some kind of a connection between them because they both had the same air to them. Nanaka dreams of becoming a professional violinist, which was inspired by Sana's suggestion as a child.

Aoi Oribe (織部 麻緒衣, Oribe Aoi; born August 28, 1990)
Voiced by: Tomoko Kaneda
Despite the fact that Sana calls her mother his aunt, Aoi and Sana are not related (in Japan it is common to refer to a woman older than oneself as oba-san, which is also the term used for an aunt). Her parents own the apartment building that Sana lives in. Her vision has weakened ever since she entered high school, so she now wears glasses. She loves to read books and is very energetic but clumsy. She has a very high-pitched voice and child-like character, but has a busty physique. Despite being childish, Aoi has a very caring personality, and never fails to aid a friend in need. Her dream is to become a picture-book author. This dream was inspired by Sana.

Shuri Wakatsuki (若月 朱里, Wakatsuki Shūri; born March 23, 1991)
Voiced by: Yukari Tamura
Shuri is one of Sana's childhood friends and the older twin of Shūsuke. Yuzuki-sensei refers her as the unlucky Wakatsuki twin. She is the most athletic of all the girls, although she is somewhat lacking when it comes to her figure. Shuri is a very supportive friend and had no trouble reconnecting with Sana, even after his prolonged absence. She also volunteers at the local retirement home and later invites Asami to join her. In the anime, she and Shūsuke run away together, but come back in the final episode to see Nanaka's violin performance.

The heroines of Myself ; Yourself (from left to right): Nanaka, Aoi, Shuri, Hinako, Yuzuki, and Asami.

Hinako Mochida (持田 雛子, Mochida Hinako; born August 5, 1997)
Voiced by: Ayumi Murata, Ayano Niina (Sorezore no Finale)
Hinako is a ten-year-old girl going on eleven. She has been infatuated with Shūsuke since he saved her from three bullies who had taken her school bag and would not give it back. She wants to know how to become a girl that he will like and asks Sana and Aoi for their help. Hinako's personality is similar to Aoi's, however being only in the fifth grade, she is more childish. In the last anime episode, it is shown that she is the girlfriend of Asami's cousin, who is five years younger than she is.

Yuzuki Fujimura (藤村 柚希, Fujimura Yuzuki; born December 26, 1982)
Voiced by: Megumi Toyoguchi
Yuzuki is the twenty-five-year-old homeroom teacher of Sana's class; Shūsuke, Nanaka, and Shuri are also in the same class. It is a well known secret that she rewards her students with caramel candy whenever they do a good job in school, whether it involves assigned duties or favors for her. This habit of rewarding her students with candy originated many years previously when she was still in high school and found a child attempting to perform a flip over a metal bar in the park (revealed to be Sana in the anime). She offered him a caramel as a reward if he succeeded, which, of course, he did.

Asami Hoshino (星野 あさみ, Hoshino Asami; born October 28, 1991)
Voiced by: Mai Nakahara
Asami is Sana's childhood friend and a second year student. Although she volunteers at the retirement home along with Shuri and seems to have a very gentle personality, she is in fact quite vindictive and takes revenge on people who hurt her. In the anime, she had a crush on Shuri and when she confessed to her, Shuri said that they should remain friends. Angered, Asami wrote a letter to the school accusing Shuri and her twin of being lovers. She later invites Shuri and Sana to the hospital to visit a sick woman from the retirement home in an attempt to hurt Shuri mentally. To her surprise, Shuri doesn't react as she expected and seems unfazed. The old woman obtains a knife and tries to kill Shuri in a fit of madness (brought on by the death of her granddaughter) but Asami knocks Shuri out of harm's way and is stabbed in her stead. She comes to realize that her hatred of Shuri is unfounded and tries to make amends.
In the game, her default romantic partner is Shūsuke Wakatsuki, as shown in "Sorezore no Finale". She is also revealed to be Nanaka's cousin.

== Media ==
=== Light novel ===
A six-chapter light novel under the title Myself ; Yourself Sorezore Overture (Myself ; Yourself それぞれのOverture), based on the visual novel's story, started serialization in the Japanese bishōjo magazine Dengeki G's Magazine on March 30, 2007, and ran until November 30, 2007. The novel is written as a prologue to the game by Takumi Nakazawa, who has also written scenarios for Ever17, and Memories Off 2nd, and is illustrated by Wadapen. Each chapter centers on one of the six heroines; chapters one through six are arranged as: Nanaka, Aoi, Shuri, Yuzuki, Hinako, and Asami.

Chapters

1. "Seven children: Nanaka's Story" (七つの子, Nanatsu no Ko), published March 30, 2007
2. "The Lost Child Aoi-san: Aoi's Story" (まいごのあおいさん, Maigo no Aoi-san), published April 30, 2007
3. "Me and Him, My Friend: Shuri's Story" (私とあいつと、私の仲間, Watashi to Aitsu to, Watashi no Nakama), published June 30, 2007
4. "Close Encounter: Yuzuki's Story", published August 30, 2007
5. "A Small and Large First Step: Hinako's Story" (小さくて、大きな第一歩, Chiisakute, Ōkina Daiippo), published September 30, 2007
6. "What Thing Did You Lose?: Asami's Story" (なくした もの は、なんですか?, Nakushita Mono wa, Nan desu ka?), published November 30, 2007

=== Anime ===
An anime television series adaptation aired in Japan between October 3, 2007 and December 26, 2007 on TV Kanagawa containing thirteen episodes. The series is written by Gō Zappa, directed by Yasuhiro Kuroda, and animated by Doga Kobo, their first television production, through the Myself ; Yourself Production Committee, which is composed of Happinet Pictures, Marvelous Entertainment, The 5pb, and Pony Canyon Enterprises. Seven DVD compilations, the first six containing two episodes of the anime, and the last containing the final episode have been released; the DVDs are distributed by Happinet Pictures. The anime has been licensed by Maiden Japan.

=== Visual novels ===
The Myself ; Yourself visual novel, developed by Yeti, was released on December 20, 2007, playable on the PlayStation 2. The game is published by Regista which mainly ports all-age versions of adult games developed by other companies, but in 2006 developed and published their first original game called I/O; Myself ; Yourself is the second time Regista has published an original title. Character design for the game is provided by Mutsumi Sasaki, who also did the original character design for Memories Off, Chaos;Head, Happy Lesson, and Futakoi. Unlike most visual novels, Myself ; Yourself has two male protagonists.

A spin-off sequel to the visual novel entitled Myself ; Yourself: Sorezore no Finale (Myself ; Yourself それぞれのfinale) was developed by the previous production staff and was released in spring 2009. The game features four new scenarios with Nanaka and Asami getting separate scenarios, and there are two duel scenarios with Shuri and Aoi in one, and Hinako and Yuzuki in the other. Several new characters are also introduced.

== Music ==
The opening theme for the anime is "Tears Infection" by Kaori, and the ending theme is "Kimi to Yozora to Sakamichi to" (キミと夜空と坂道と) by Kanako Itō; the singles for both songs were released on October 24, 2007. The first opening theme for the visual novel is "Day-break" by Kaori, and the second opening theme is "ivy" by Kanako Itō. "Day-break" was released on the same single album as "Tears Infection", and "ivy" was released on the same single as "Kimi to Yozora to Sakamichi to" as B-side tracks. The visual novel version has seven ending themes: "Another World" and "Myself ; Yourself" by Ami Koshimizu, "Aoitori" (青い鳥) by Tomoko Kaneda, "Never leave me alone" by Yukari Tamura, "Hajimete no Kiss? (#^.^#)" (はじめてのKiss?(#^.^#)) by Ayumi Murata, "Mirai Kansoku" (未来観測) by Megumi Toyoguchi, and "Haru no Kiss" (春のKISS) by Mai Nakahara. Each of the ending themes are sung by the voice actresses of the six heroines from the series. These songs were released as character song albums: volumes one through three were released on November 21, 2007, and consist of the themes "Another World", "Hajimete no Kiss? (#^.^#)", and "Haru no Kiss" respectively. The second batch, volumes four through six, were released on December 7, 2007, and consisted of the themes "Never leave me home", "Aoitori", and "Mirai Kansoku" respectively. The game's original soundtrack was released with the limited edition release of the game on December 20, 2007; the soundtrack was also used for the anime version.

== Reception ==
Stig Høgset from THEM Anime Reviews comments that the anime is similar to Kanon due to both having "a guy who's not a complete loser, who returns to his old town and meets various people, most of them girls or teachers/parents of said girls. Unlike with Kanon, however, these are people he already know [sic]." He criticizes the anime for Aoi's "unchanging voice" throughout the flashback, the present and the epilogue that flash forwards ten years into the future.
