= Code 18 =

2011 video game

Code_18
- Cover art, depicting (clockwise from top left) Arika, Hikari, Nanari, Yuzu, and Tamaki
- Developer: Cyberfront
- Publisher: Cyberfront
- Director: Ken Wakabayashi
- Producer: Ken Wakabayashi
- Artist: Yutaka Akatsu
- Writer: Chabou Higurashi
- Series: Infinity
- Platforms: PlayStation Portable; Xbox 360; Microsoft Windows
- Release: PSP, Xbox 360: JP: September 29, 2011; Microsoft Windows: JP: December 21, 2012
- Genre: Visual novel
- Mode: Single-player

Code_18 is a visual novel video game developed by Cyberfront and released on September 29, 2011, for the PlayStation Portable and Xbox 360, and later for Microsoft Windows. It is a reboot of the Infinity series, which also includes Never 7: The End of Infinity, Ever 17: The Out of Infinity, Remember 11: The Age of Infinity, and the spin-off 12Riven: The Psi-Climinal of Integral. The story follows Hayato Hino, a high school student who receives voice messages from the future on his phone, and is stuck in a loop, repeating a month of his life over and over again. The gameplay involves advancing the story through conversations with characters, with dialogue choices influencing the story's path.

Cyberfront bought the rights to the Infinity series after its previous developer, KID, closed down. The game's writing was done by the group Run & Gun, while the sound production was handled by the band Milktub. While the development team had originally planned to use a theme of "escape from an enclosed space" similarly to previous Infinity games, it was changed due to concerns of the size of the game's audience, and was seen as a reboot of the series. Western journalists were optimistic, while Famitsu 360 gave it an average score. Sales of the title were low, with both console versions reaching a combined total of over 11,000 units.

== Gameplay ==
The player character talks with Hikari Haruna, one of the supporting characters and romance options.

As with the rest of the Infinity series, Code_18 is a visual novel in which the player makes progress through the linear story by talking to characters and listening to dialogue. Disposing of the escape scenarios of earlier Infinity games, the core gameplay features the player character Hayato Hino exploring his school environment and interacting with five female characters with whom he can develop relationships. The state of Hayato's romantic relationships, together with choices made during the story, can alter the flow of events to a degree; some options can trigger alternative bad endings for characters, and the game's full ending is altered depending on whom Hayato has formed a romantic relationship with.

== Synopsis ==
=== Setting and characters ===
In Code_18, the player takes the role of Hayato Hino, a high school student at Ryuusei Academy in Tokyo, and a member of the school's Second Science Club. Among other characters are Hikari Haruna, a friend of Hayato's, who often visits the club despite not being a member; Tamaki Tatekawa, a wealthy girl with otaku hobbies; Yuzu Soraki, a tomboy who is an acquaintance of Hayato's; Nanari Torikura, a quiet girl who often reads alone; Arika Tokitou, who appears to dislike Hayato.

=== Plot ===
The game opens on September 11, 2018. When Hayato is about to test his "Dragon Unit" flight pack on the school's roof, a girl falls from the sky, wearing a similar device. He tries to save her, but falls to his death; after this, he is transported back in time without any memory of the event, and manages to save her. Her name turns out to be Arika Tokitou. Ryuusei Academy and the Second Science Club prepare for a school festival that is scheduled for a month later, when Hayato's science professor, Genkuro Kanbara, gives him a smartphone chip composed of an "Agastia Stone", which theoretically would allow him to receive voice messages from the future. He installs it and does receive messages from the future, but is unable to tell what they are saying.

At one point, due to an accident with the Dragon Unit, Hayato's house blows up, forcing him to sleep in the science clubroom. He and the rest of the club decide that for the festival, they should put on a live performance for Hikari. During the month, Hayato and Hikari get closer, and he moves in with her. He helps her overcome issues with self-confidence and to succeed at the live performance, and they become a couple. At the end of the festival, time moves backwards to September 11 again; the same month loops several times, with Hayato being unaware of it and having no memory of past loops. During each loop, he gets closely involved with one of the game's female characters, helps them with the festival, and with resolving their personal problems. While Arika is distant at first, she starts to lighten up to Hayato the more loops he goes through.

After going through several loops, Hayato returns to September 11 with his memories intact, and realizes that Arika is the only one who appears to have a connection to the looping. He confronts her, and while she admits to have a connection, she does not trust him to help her. When Hayato realizes that his house is about to explode, with Hikari and Arika inside, he gets them out instead of saving the Dragon Unit; this earns him Arika's trust, and she tells him that she is a time traveler from 2040. Learning that her presence caused a time loop, she wanted to return to her time, but was unable to as her time machine had broken. Hayato gathers parts to repair it with, and again gets close to Hikari. He learns that Arika's true identity is Akari Hino, and that she is Hayato and Hikari's daughter from the future. In the future, Hayato had become a workaholic, building a time machine while neglecting Hikari and Akira; in anger, Akira had stolen the time machine and traveled to 2018. As the time machine only works in a zero-gravity environment, they combine it with the Dragon Unit and take it to the 1,200 feet Sky Tower; their way there is hindered by an earthquake, however they are able to reach it with the help of Hikari, Tamaki, Yuzu, Nanari, and professor Kanbara.

The sender of the voice messages from the future is revealed to be the Hayato of 2040; as the future versions of Hayato and Hikari had seen Akari in 2018, they knew that they needed to recreate the events in order to avoid a time paradox that would cause Akari to cease existing. Because of this, Hayato had spent all of his time on creating a time machine by 2040, while he acted cold to Akari on purpose to give her incentive to travel back in time. The Hayato of 2040 then sent voice messages to his 2018 self to offer guidance and to cause an ontological paradox, ensuring Akari's continued existence. Akari travels back to 2040, breaking the loop, and makes up with her parents.

== Development and release ==
After KID – the developer of previous Infinity games – closed down, Cyberfront bought the rights to all of their projects. Ken Wakabayashi, who worked on 12Riven: The Psi-Climinal of Integral as director, returned for Code_18 as director and producer, in addition to creating the basic scenario with Chabou Higurashi. The writing group Run & Gun, mostly known for working on otome games such as Skip Beat!, wrote the game's scenario, while the character design was done by comic book artist Yutaka Akatsu. The game was seen as a reboot of the Infinity series. The theme of "an escape from an enclosed space" from the previous three games in the series was not used in Code_18; instead, it was set in a school with romance themes. Initially, the development team had planned to use the "escape" theme, but had to change it due to concerns about the size of the audience for the game. The game's sound production was done by members of the band Milktub, who also performed the game's opening and ending themes: the opening theme, "Agastia Stone" (アガスティアストーン) was composed and arranged by Kyoura Miyazuki, and written and sung by Airi.

The game was showcased at Cyberfront's booth at the DreamParty Tokyo 2011 spring event on May 1. In September of the same year, the PlayStation Portable version of the game was playable at Konami's booth at Tokyo Game Show. A mobile game titled Code_18: Another Side was made to promote Code_18, and was released for free via Mobage on June 8, 2011. In it, the player spends time with the game's female characters, and makes progress by getting more intimate with them.

Code_18 was published by Cyberfront on September 29, 2011, for PlayStation Portable and Xbox 360 in Japan In addition to the standard edition, a limited edition which included an artbook, an audio drama, and a soundtrack CD, was made available. Certain stores also offered telephone cards, pre-paid cards for book stores, and postcards, with "seductive" illustrations of the game's female characters in a negligee, in underwear, or naked, for people who bought the game. A Microsoft Windows version was released on December 21, 2012, both separately and in a bundle with Ever 17: The Out of Infinity.

== Reception ==
Reception

Review score
Publication	Score
Famitsu	26/40 (7, 7, 6, 6)

Prior to the game's release, some video game journalists wondered about the game's tone: Spencer at Siliconera said that he was curious about it since KID mostly made bishoujo games, while Run & Gun was best known for otome games; and Andrew Barker at RPGFan thought it would be interesting to see if the game would have a different feeling to it compared to previous Infinity games. Derek Heemsbergen, also writing for RPGFan, thought that a new Infinity game was "welcome news".

At the game's release, the video game magazine Famitsu gave the game a score of 26/40 in their cross-review, with individual reviewers giving it the scores 7, 7, 6, and 6. At the end of 2011, the PlayStation Portable version was the 809th best selling video game of the year in Japan, with 5,766 copies sold; the Xbox 360 version was on 847th place, with 5,311 copies sold, adding up to a total of 11,077 copies across both platforms during the debut year.
