= List of Myself ; Yourself episodes =

The cover of the first DVD compilation released by Happinet Pictures.

Myself ; Yourself is a Japanese animated television series, directed by Tetsuaki Matsuda, animated by the Japanese animation studio Dogakobo and produced by the Myself ; Yourself Production Committee, which is composed of Happinet Pictures, Marvelous Entertainment, The 5pb and Pony Canyon Enterprises. The series is based on the visual novel Myself ; Yourself by Yeti, adapting the source material over thirteen episodes. The episodes' plots follows Sana Hidaka and his return to the town of Sakuranomori after leaving the town and his friends five years earlier.

The series was broadcast from October 3 to December 26, 2007, on TV Kanagawa, and later on Chiba TV, TV Aichi, TV Saitama, TV Osaka and AT-X. The AT-X broadcast was notably late, starting on November 22, 2007.

Two pieces of theme music are used for the series. The opening theme is "Tears Infection" by Kaori and the closing theme is Kanako Itō's "Kimi to Yozora to Sakamichi to" (キミと夜空と坂道と). The singles for "Tears Infection" and "Kimi to Yozora to Sakamichi to" were released on October 24, 2007.

Seven DVD compilations, the first six containing two episodes of the anime, and the last containing the final episode were released. The first was released on December 21, 2007, and the second on January 25, 2008. The DVDs are distributed by Happinet Pictures.

== Episode list ==
No.	Title	Original release date
1	"Nostalgic Place"; Transliteration: "Natsukashii Basho" (Japanese: なつかしい場所)	October 3, 2007
Before he leaves the town of Sakuranomori, Sana Hidaka has a party with his friends, Shusuke Wakatsuki, Nanaka Yatsuhiro, Aoi Oribe and Shuri Watatsuki. They each give him going away presents, with Nanaka playing a half-completed song on her violin. Five years later, Sana returns to Sakuranomori, staying at an apartment owned by Aoi's parents. When he goes to school the next day, he recognizes two of his childhood friends: Shusuke and Shuri. When Nanaka enters the classroom, Sana fails to recognize her. As a result, he is slapped furiously by Nanaka.
2	"The Important Melody"; Transliteration: "Taisetsu na Merodī" (Japanese: 大切なメロディー)	October 10, 2007
Sana mulls over Nanaka's reaction, and is elected the classroom representative along with Nanaka when Shusuke refused to stand for another year. Nanaka still acts coldly towards Sana, leaving him lost in the library. When he returns to the classroom with the aid of Asami Hoshino, she looks jealously at him and Asami. Later, Sana and Nanaka coincidentally go to the music room, where Nanaka, sequestered in the teacher's office, overhears Sana playing the song she played to him on her violin the day he left. Touched, she says hello to him the following morning.
3	"Cookies and Pebbles"; Transliteration: "Kukkī to Koishi" (Japanese: クッキーと小石)	October 17, 2007
In order to repair Sana's and Nanaka's relationship, Shusuke and Shuri decide to go on a trip to a river to which the five used to go in their youth. Beforehand, Sana accidentally breaks Nanaka's mirror, and Nanaka is appreciative when Sana buys her a new one, but forlorn after learning that Sana bought one for Asami as well. After the group goes to the river, they swim at the spa, where Nanaka is embarrassed at her lackluster swimsuit. As Nanaka is going home with Sana and Aoi, she reveals she made cookies for the group, and the three eat them at Aoi's apartment. There, Sana gives Nanaka a pink stone he found near the river as a gift.
4	"Not a Child"; Transliteration: "Kodomo ja nai yo" (Japanese: 子供じゃないよ)	October 24, 2007
On his way back from school, Shusuke comes upon a group of boys tormenting a young elementary school girl. Shusuke chases the boys off, and the next day, the girl, Hinako Mochida, thanks Shusuke. Shortly afterwards, Hinako meets Sana at a restaurant and reveals her infatuation with Shusuke. With Aoi's aid, Hinako attempts to court Shusuke, but despite her efforts, is rejected by him. Despite this, Shusuke reveals that he considered Hinako an adult, which Hinako tearfully accounts to Sana, noting her satisfaction nevertheless.
5	"The Cherry Tree That Won't Bloom"; Transliteration: "Sakanai Sakura" (Japanese: 咲かない桜)	October 31, 2007
Nanaka spends increasing amounts of time practicing for the upcoming festival at the temple, where she will perform a traditional dance so the sakura will bloom that year. However, she forsakes her practice to go with Sana, Shuri and Asami to help at a retirement home. After meeting a woman traumatized by the death of her granddaughter, Nanaka mysteriously refuses to play her violin to cheer her up. Later at the festival, the group observes Nanaka perform her dance, and Sana sees her afterwards, expressing his delight at her dancing.
6	"I'm An Adult"; Transliteration: "Otona da yo" (Japanese: オトナだよ)	November 7, 2007
After learning that her mother will not be home for her birthday, Hinako moves into Sana's apartment. Hinako's inexpertise in cooking and Sana's shock at her arrival contribute to the hectic situation, but Sana manages to get her comfortably situated into the room. She was not able to sleep without her Yeti giant soft toy and asks Sana to be her Yeti and let her hug him. Sana eventually learns that the day was Hinako's birthday, and the following day, takes her around town with Shusuke. Once they return to Sana's apartment, Nanaka, Aoi, and Shuri have prepared a birthday party for Hinako. After Hinako leaves the party, she thanks Sana for the only birthday party she has ever had with a kiss on the cheek before running home.
7	"Teacher's Caramel"; Transliteration: "Sensei no Kyarameru" (Japanese: 先生のキャラメル)	November 14, 2007
Due to Sana and Nanaka's work as classroom representatives, their sensei, Yuzuki Fujimura frequently gives them caramels, causing Sana to remember an incident in a youth when a younger Yuzuki gave him a caramel. Meanwhile, Shuri attempts to gather signatures for a project to stop the building of a new town hall over the nature center. The school's administration forbids Shuri to continue. At her home, her father, the one who proposed the construction, angrily berates Shuri, who flees home. At the retirement home, Sana and Asami continue to help there, and fulfill a request by an elder lady to bury a package on a hill. However, Asami trips and Nanaka comes upon Sana and Asami accidentally embracing each other.
8	"Secret Post"; Transliteration: "Himitsu no Posuto" (Japanese: 秘密のポスト)	November 21, 2007
Nanaka acts coldly towards Sana the following day, even after Sana explains his incident with Asami was an accident. After Sana exclaims that Nanaka is not her old self, she angrily runs away. Sana comes upon an old mailbox that Sana and Nanaka used for private communication in their youth, and finds dozens of letters, some desperate cries for help. Sana then learns from Shusuke that three years earlier, Nanaka's house had burned down, killing both of her parents and traumatizing her. After learning of Yuzuki's ability to cheer herself up with caramel, Sana meets Nanaka, who tearfully denounces him for not being there for her when she needed him most.
9	"Do Your Best! Animenger!"; Transliteration: "Ganbare! Animenjā!" (Japanese: がんばれ!アニメンジャー!)	November 28, 2007
As Nanaka contemplates how to apologize to Sana, she goes into shock after accidentally burning the fish she was cooking, bringing her close to recollecting memories of the fire that consumed her house. She then overhears a discussion between her uncle and her aunt hinting that her uncle was the one who caused the fire. The next day, the group goes to a theme park, where they meet Asami and her cousin. After viewing a tokusatsu show, Nanaka gathers enough courage to talk to Sana. As they ascend in a Ferris wheel, the two reconcile. In another car, Shuri and Shusuke angrily argue over their stepmother, and Asami accidentally catches a glimpse of Shuri's saddened face.
10	"For Sakura's Sake"; Transliteration: "Sakura no Tame ni" (Japanese: 桜のために)	December 5, 2007
Shuri and Shusuke travel to the grave of their mother to pay their respects, buying each other presents afterwards to cheer themselves up. When they return to school the next day, an anonymous letter claims that Shuri and Syusuke spent the night in a love hotel. Although the school refuses to pursue this, Shuri and Shusuke's father angrily beats Shusuke for this. Shuri, Asami and Sana then go to give a gift to one of the ladies from the retirement home. However, the lady attempts to kill Shuri, and is stopped by Asami, who is stabbed in the process. As a result, Shuri's father plans to send Shuri to London to save his political career, and Shusuke promises to join her so they can be together.
11	"Confession"; Transliteration: "Kokuhaku" (Japanese: 告白)	December 16, 2007
Sana visits Asami in the hospital, where Asami reveals that she was the one who sent the anonymous letter claiming that Shuri and Shusuke were in a love hotel. She admits that ever since Shuri rejected her for expressing her feelings towards Shuri, Asami has constantly hated her. When Shuri and Shusuke arrive to visit Asami, she acts normally, although she asks Shuri to converse privately with her. Shuri later runs out of the hospital in tears. The following day, Shuri and Shusuke are absent from school, and Sana realizes that they are running away to avoid being separated. He desperately runs after their train, and reminiscent of Shusuke when Sana left town, Sana yells that they will always be friends, and Shusuke and Shuri erupt in tears.
12	"Red Memories"; Transliteration: "Akai Kioku" (Japanese: 赤い記憶)	December 19, 2007
Sana, Nanaka and Aoi are depressed because of Shuri and Shusuke leaving, and decide to go to the river to take their minds of it. However, Aoi fakes being ill to allow Sana and Nanaka to be together. After a failed attempt at fishing, Sana takes Nanaka to a cave that he and Shusuke considered their secret hideaway. After it starts to rain outside, the two stay in the cave, where Sana asks Nanaka why she did not send the notes in the mailbox directly to Sana. Nanaka reveals that she was afraid that the Sana she knew and loved was gone. The following morning, as Nanaka walks outside, she recalls what occurred in the fire in her youth and screams in pain.
13	"Bonds"; Transliteration: "Kizuna" (Japanese: きずな)	December 26, 2007
Nanaka recalls that on the night of the fire, her father had been told that Nanaka was not his child, and in turn, he beat his wife and set the house on fire. In response, Nanaka locks herself in her room and refuses visitors, and Sana visits every day in an attempt to talk to her. One day, Sana finds Nanaka in the bath with her wrist cut, and he manages to have her taken to a hospital. In a subsequent conversation, Sana reveals that he also attempted suicide in his old middle school, and came back to Sakuranomori in order to be with his friends. Ten years later, everyone returns to see a concert performed by Nanaka. Before the concert, Sana proposes marriage to Nanaka, who accepts. For the concert, Nanaka plays the finished version of the song she wrote for Sana when she was younger titled "Myself ; Yourself". Shusuke and Shuri attend the concert though their relationship remained unexplained on their return.

== See also ==
- List of anime based on video games
