= Never 7: The End of Infinity =

2000 video game

- Cover art, featuring Izumi (top) and Yuka (bottom)
- Developer: KID
- Publishers: KID, Cyberfront, 5pb., Mages, Spike Chunsoft
- Director: Takumi Nakazawa
- Writer: Kotaro Uchikoshi
- Composer: Takeshi Abo
- Series: Infinity
- Platforms: PlayStation; Neo Geo Pocket Color; Dreamcast; Microsoft Windows; PlayStation 2 Macintosh; PlayStation Portable; Android iOS; Nintendo Switch; PlayStation 4
- Release: March 23, 2000: PlayStation; JP: March 23, 2000 Neo Geo Pocket Color; JP: November 23, 2000 Dreamcast; JP: December 21, 2000 Microsoft Windows; JP: October 26, 2001; WW: March 6, 2025 PlayStation 2; JP: June 26, 2003 Mac; JP: March 3, 2005 PlayStation Portable; JP: March 12, 2009 Android; JP: August 28, 2012 iOS; JP: October 24, 2012 NS, PS4; WW: March 6, 2025
- Genre: Visual novel
- Mode: Single-player

Never 7: The End of Infinity is a visual novel video game developed by KID. It was originally published by KID on March 23, 2000, for the PlayStation as Infinity, and has since been released on multiple platforms. It is the first entry in the Infinity series, and is followed by Ever 17, Remember 11, the spin-off 12Riven, and the reboot Code_18.

The story follows Makoto Ishihara, a college student who attends a seminar camp on an island together with three other students; he also befriends three other people whom he meets on the island. The game takes place over the course of a week, and consists of the player reading the story, occasionally making choices that affect the direction of the plot; on the sixth day, one of the characters dies, and the game moves back in time to the beginning, letting the player use knowledge from the first set of six days to make new choices, to try to prevent the death.

The game was directed by Takumi Nakazawa, planned and written by Kotaro Uchikoshi, and composed by Takeshi Abo. Uchikoshi included science fiction elements, but was unable to make heavy use of them, as his superiors at KID thought that the game needed to focus on cute female characters in order to perform well commercially. Abo composed music based on his first impressions of reading the game's story, with a focus on its "emotional flow". Because of the science fiction and theoretical themes, he composed what he describes as "geometric music".

RPGFan praised the game for its plot, its intimate scope, and its music, whereas Famitsu found the game's mood boring. As the science fiction elements were well received, later entries in the series gradually moved away from the dating theme and became more focused on science fiction.

== Gameplay ==
Average gameplay, showing a conversation between the player and Yuka in a fan translation of the game.

Never 7 is a visual novel in which the player reads the story, and presses a button to advance through the text. At certain points, the player gets to make choices which affect the direction the plot proceeds in; these involve choosing what location to move to, and what the player character should say, as well as subtler choices such as whether to look a girl in the eyes or to take her hand. The game is presented from a first-person perspective, with pre-rendered backgrounds and 2D character portraits accompanying the text. The visuals mostly consist of still images, but with characters often changing their expression while talking.

After six days have passed in the game's story, the game moves back in time to the beginning, allowing the player to make new choices based on the knowledge they have gained through the first six days to try to prevent certain events. Depending on the choices the player makes, the game either ends on a "bad ending" on the sixth day, or continues into a "good ending" on the seventh day. After finishing the game, a picture gallery and a music test are made available in an omake mode. When replaying parts of the game, the player is able to use a fast forward function to move past sections of text that they have already read. The game also includes an "Append Story" mode in which the player can play new scenarios that are downloaded from the developer's website.

In the Dreamcast version of the game, a meter on the system's Visual Memory Unit shows how the player is doing with the female characters: it shows three blocks, which have hearts inside if the player is doing well. In the PlayStation Portable version, the player has access to a glossary, which explains various key words used in the game. In the Android version, the player gets points throughout the game, which can be used to unlock applications such as a calculator, a calendar, and mini-games.

== Synopsis ==
=== Setting and characters ===
Never 7 takes place in the week of April 1–7, 2019. Makoto Ishihara, the player character, is a college student and truant who rarely attends his classes. As a result, he is forced to attend a seminar camp held on a remote island in to be allowed to pass to his next grade. Three other students are at the camp: Yuka Kawashima, the leader of the group; Haruka Higuchi, a studious and quiet girl; and Okuhiko Iida, a wealthy playboy who is the heir of the Iida Financial Group. Makoto also meets three girls unrelated to the seminar camp: the wealthy Saki Asakura; and sisters Kurumi and Izumi Morino, who are temporarily running the café Lunabeach on the island. The seven are stuck on the island for a week due to a tropical cyclone preventing boats from leaving, and become friends.

=== Plot ===
The game begins on April 1 with Makoto awakening from a nightmare of a girl dying on April 6 with a bell in her hand. As the week goes on, he occasionally experiences premonitions of the future, all of which come true. Depending on the player's choices, Makoto ends up getting close to one of the girls, and on April 5, the story branches into different routes focusing on one of them. In each route, the girl Makoto was close to dies on April 6 with a bell in her hand. Afterwards, Makoto finds that he has traveled back in time to April 1, retaining the memories of the previous six days. Concluding that he is trapped in an infinite loop, he vows to keep the girl alive and break free of the loop. He does so by rebuilding his relationships with her while dealing with the emotional problem troubling her. On April 6, the girl ends up in a situation similar to when she died in the last loop, but Makoto saves her, breaking free of the loop and becoming her boyfriend.

After finishing Yuka, Haruka, Saki, and Kurumi's routes, the player gets access to the Izumi Cure route, in which Makoto learns that Izumi and Okuhiko had deceived him into thinking that his premonitions were true. Makoto confronts Izumi, after which both he and Izumi fall off a cliff. They travel back in time, retaining their memories of the past six days. Makoto accepts that he has traveled through time, and Izumi reveals that she is the professor in charge of the seminar camp, and that the events of the past week were a science experiment; she attempted to test the phenomenon known as Curé Syndrome, where if multiple people believe in a delusion and the delusion is spread to others, the delusion becomes reality. Makoto was the test subject of the experiment, which was meant to involve him having the delusion that he could have premonitions; unexpectedly, he turned out to have real premonitions.

Izumi suggests that in the first six days, Makoto had been deceived by her and Okuhiko, but rather than believing in premonitions had believed he had traveled back in time. When Izumi died on April 6, and Makoto had desired to travel back in time, Curé Syndrome manifested. She suggests that while he had thought that he was traveling back in time, he had only imagined a different past where events played out differently, as part of a delusion, and that he had given himself partial memories in the form of premonitions in each loop; in the last loop, he would have given himself all his memories, other than the knowledge that he is experiencing a delusion. She says that once Makoto succeeds in saving her, he will break out of the delusion, and the six days in his delusion will become reality. Makoto refuses to believe her, claiming that everything around him is reality, but starts to doubt throughout the week. Depending on the player's choices, the route branches into two endings. In one, the delusions appear to be changing reality, but are revealed to be a chain of coincidences. In the other, the delusions do change reality, and Makoto wakes up at the bottom of the cliff he fell down at the end of the last loop, badly wounded from having protected Izumi during the fall. It is left ambiguous as to what is real and what is a delusion, and whether Makoto has escaped to reality or still is trapped in his delusion.

== Development ==
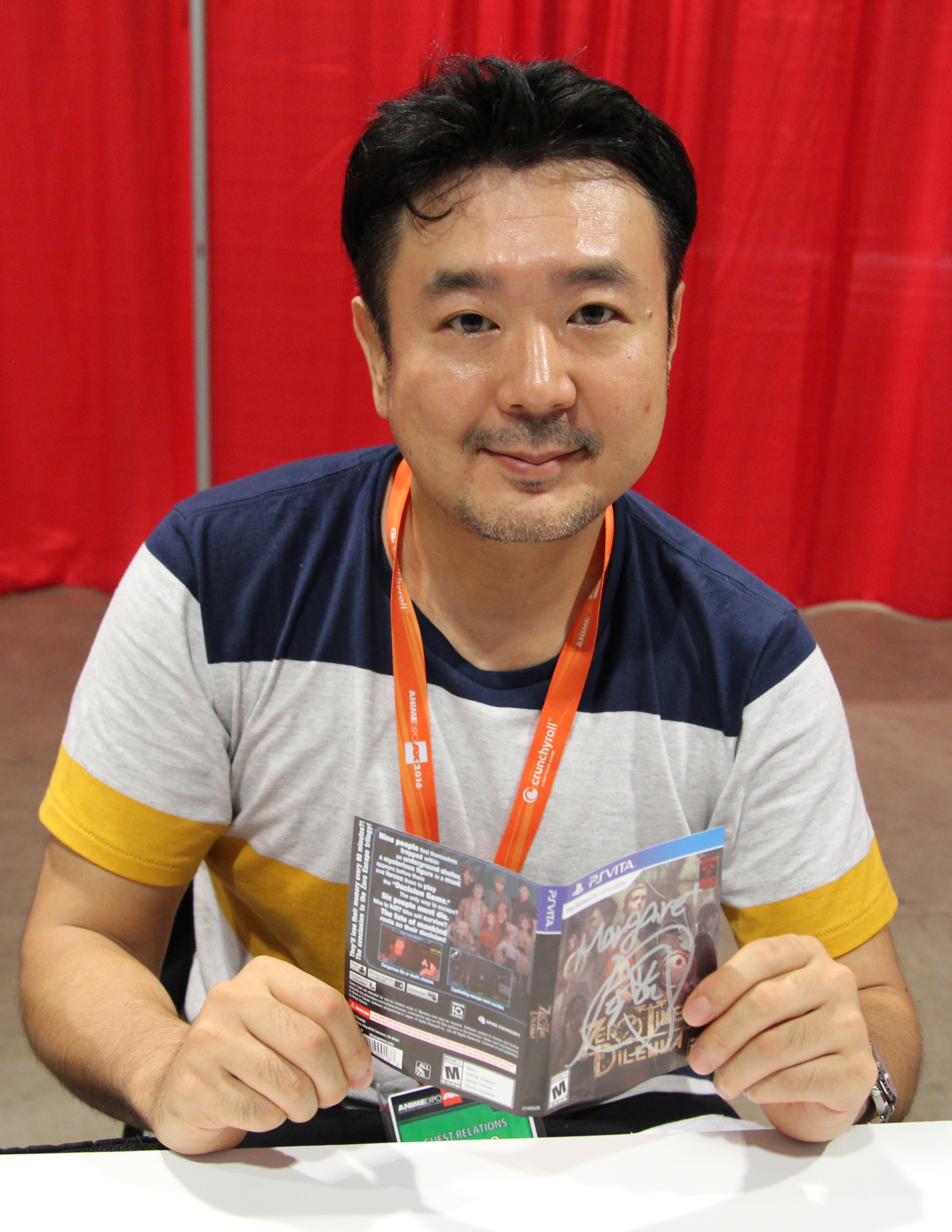
The game was written by Kotaro Uchikoshi, as his second visual novel after Memories Off.

The game was directed by Takumi Nakazawa, while Kotaro Uchikoshi was the planner and scenario writer. Development began immediately after Uchikoshi's first visual novel, Memories Off, was finished. He was unable to make heavy use of science fiction themes in Never 7, as his superiors at KID told him that the game needed to include cute girl characters in order to sell; he kept science fiction themes light, and the game was designed with a focus on dating game elements, with the main focus being to develop a relationship with a girl. The Dreamcast version includes new scenarios not available in the PlayStation version.

The development team depicted reality in the world of Never 7 as subjective and relative rather than absolute. As such, for each route, that route's history is the only one Makoto knows and the only one that is real to him; the Curé syndrome only exists to him in the routes where it is mentioned. The bells were used as symbols for reality being relative, and were described by the development team as "vague existences", saying that one cannot know if they exist or not. In the bad ending to Izumi's route, the bells, which "should be fictional" remain while something that should exist disappears; this was a metaphor for the idea that delusions become reality while reality becomes a delusion. The game's title comes from how Makoto is unable to escape the infinite loop and reach April 7, and how most of the seven characters die at some point during the game. It is also based on the belief that 7 is a lucky number. The game was designed to be open to speculation and multiple interpretations, a design philosophy that was carried over to later entries in the series and was part of what led to Infinity being chosen as the series title. One example of the openness to interpretation was that development team did not want to confirm or deny whether the game's world was connected to that of the Memories Off series, saying that while characters with similar names may appear, they wanted to leave the player to decide for themselves what the answer would be.

The game's soundtrack was composed by Takeshi Abo, and features "geometric music" because of the game's theoretical and science fiction elements. Prior to composing the music, he read through the game's story, to understand the setting and each character's personality as much as possible. He would write his impressions of the plot, with a focus on the "emotional flow" and the events that occur throughout the story; he valued his first impressions as very important for this. According to Abo, this method takes longer time, but allows him to make better music with a stronger relation to the game's world than if he had just designated different songs to different points of the game. Because he enjoyed the story, the music strongly reflects Abo's own musical tastes. The opening and ending themes of the PlayStation Portable version, titled "Sen Oku no Hoshikuzu Furasu Yoru no Sora" and "Hokorobishi Hana", respectively, were performed by the band Asriel.

The game was originally released by KID for PlayStation under the title Infinity on March 23, 2000. A Neo Geo Pocket Color version titled Infinity Cure was released on November 23, 2000, also by KID. On December 21, 2000, KID released a Dreamcast version titled Never 7: The End of Infinity; this version was also released for Microsoft Windows on October 26, 2001, and for PlayStation 2 on May 22, 2003. On March 3, 2005, it was released for Macintosh computers through the "GameX for Mac" service. Cyberfront released it for PlayStation Portable on March 12, 2009, for Android on August 28, 2012, and for iOS on September 11, 2012.

== Reception ==
Reception

Review scores
Publication	Score
Famitsu	26/40 (PlayStation)
Famitsu DC Dreamcast	7/10, 8/10, 6/10 (Dreamcast)
RPGFan	92% (Dreamcast)

In reviews around the time of the game's release, reviewers appreciated the science fiction themes of the game. Neal Chandran at RPGFan called the plot excellent, and appreciated how the game's story is a "personal, character-driven, emotive, human tale based around gentle romance" rather than an apocalyptic "beat-the-bad-guy kind of story". He also liked how the game's interactivity is on a more personal scope than in adventure games and role-playing games he had played. He found the game's pacing and writing quality to be good, and liked the music, finding it to complement the mood of the game well. While he thought the game's graphics were not "anything special", he was impressed by the character designs, especially that of the character Haruka. A writer at Famitsu, however, called the game's mood boring from start to end in their review of the PlayStation version. Reviewing the Dreamcast version, Famitsu DC Dreamcast's three reviews praised the high resolution graphics and its twists that could only be done in these types of games. While one reviewer found the story a bit long-winded, another founds its tempo good and appreciated that scenarios could be downloaded from the internet.

According to Nakazawa, the original version of the game did not sell very well. The PlayStation Portable version was on the lower end of the top 1000 best selling video games of the year in Japan in 2009, with an estimated 4,250 copies sold.

=== Legacy ===
After Never 7, four more Infinity games were made: Ever 17: The Out of Infinity, Remember 11: The Age of Infinity, 12Riven: The Psi-Climinal of Integral, and Code_18; Nakazawa worked on Ever 17 and Remember 11, and Uchikoshi worked on all except Code_18. As the science fiction elements of Never 7 had been positively received by critics, Uchikoshi gradually focused more on science fiction and less on romance with each new game, with Remember 11 not featuring any dating elements at all. Originally, Never 7 was not intended to be part of a series, but during the development of Ever 17, it was decided to connect the worlds of the two games.
