= 12Riven: The Psi-Climinal of Integral =

2008 video game

- PlayStation 2 cover art
- Developers: KID (until 2006); CyberFront (2006-2008); SDR Project (2006-2008)
- Publisher: CyberFront
- Director: Ken Wakabayashi
- Artists: Bomi; Yuu Takigawa
- Writer: Kotaro Uchikoshi
- Composer: Takeshi Abo
- Series: Infinity
- Platforms: PlayStation 2; Microsoft Windows; PlayStation Portable
- Release: PlayStation 2: JP: March 13, 2008; Microsoft Windows: JP: April 4, 2008; PlayStation Portable: JP: April 16, 2009
- Genre: Visual novel
- Mode: Single player

12Riven: The Psi-Climinal of Integral (Note: Stylized as 12Riven: The Ψcliminal of Integral) is a visual novel video game developed by KID, CyberFront, and SDR Project, and released on March 13, 2008, for the PlayStation 2 and April 16, 2009, for the PlayStation Portable. There is a regular edition, and a special edition which included the game's original soundtrack. KID are known for producing the Memories Off series, and the Infinity series which includes Never 7: The End of Infinity, Ever 17: The Out of Infinity, and Remember 11: The Age of Infinity. When KID declared bankruptcy in November 2006, production on the game was halted until CyberFront took over and resumed production.

The game had two different PC releases on April 4, 2008. It was released as a standalone product and as a part of the Infinity Plus pack (which includes PC versions of Never 7: The End of Infinity, Ever 17: The Out of Infinity, Remember 11: The Age of Infinity and 12Riven). A port for Android and iOS was announced by Cyberfront in 2012 but was ultimately not released as Cyberfront was dissolved in 2013.

== Gameplay ==
12Riven is a visual novel in which the player makes progress by reading the game's story. At certain points during conversations with other characters, the player is given a set of choices. Depending on what the player chooses, the story diverges into different branches, eventually leading to different endings; there is only one "true ending".

== Plot ==
=== Characters ===
==== Player characters ====
- Renmaru Miyabidō (雅堂 錬丸, Miyabidō Renmaru)
- Narumi Mishima (三嶋 鳴海, Mishima Narumi)

==== Others ====
- Myū Takae (高江 ミュウ, Takae Myū). Voiced by: Ai Nonaka
- Mei Kiridera (霧寺 メイ, Kiridera Mei). Voiced by: Masaya Matsukaze
- Maina (マイナ). Voiced by: Rina Satō
- Ōtemachi (大手町). Voiced by: Junichi Suwabe
- Chisato Inose (伊野瀬 チサト, Inose Chisato). Voiced by: Ai Shimizu
- Omega Inose (伊野瀬 オメガ, Inose Omega). Voiced by: Naozumi Takahashi

=== Story ===
The story of 12Riven takes place on May 20, 2012, with high school student Renmaru Miyabidō biking his way speedily towards the abandoned Integral (インテグラル, Integuraru) building after receiving a message on his cellphone that Myū, an old friend of his, would die at the building's top level today at noon. When he gets there, he checks his wristwatch and sees that it is 11:24 AM.

Elsewhere, police detective Narumi Mishima is on her motorcycle heading towards the same location. She has received a request from a friend and coworker asking her to help save a girl named "Myū" at Integral. Narumi must save Myū to prevent the execution of the "Second Eclipse Plan" (第弐エクリプス計画, Daini Ekuripusu Keikaku). Narumi has never heard of this phrase before, moreover, the message was sent with the "XXX Lv6" marking. This was a rating scale for the severity of a situation, and a level 6 marking has never been used. Even a large-scale terrorist threat was set at level 5. The message also indicated to Narumi that someone named Renmaru may be there, and that he will be on her side.

Renmaru finds nothing at the observation deck of the building, but when he goes outside onto the opening of the building, he finds Myū injured on the ground. Renmaru also finds her attacker there, but is unable to defeat him because every time Renmaru tries to connect a blow, he is thrown onto the ground himself by some unknown force. At this point, Myū's attacker draws out a gun, he takes Myū and threatens Renmaru to leave the place quietly after he counts to ten with his eyes closed. Renmaru does not know what to do and stands there hopelessly. Right as the attacker counts down to one, Narumi arrives at the scene and points her gun at him.

== Development and release ==
The game was developed by KID and SDR Project. 12Riven and Memories Off 5: Encore, another game that was under development by KID, were originally in danger of not being released when KID filed for bankruptcy in 2006. Both games were resurrected in 2007 by CyberFront when they acquired KID's intellectual properties.

The game's music was composed by Takeshi Abo. Both the game's opening theme, "Third Bridge", and ending theme, "Process" (プロセス, Purosesu), are performed by Kaori. Both theme songs were included in a CD single that was sold on April 23, 2008, and debuted on Oricon at 144th place. Chomaru Shikura composed and wrote the lyrics to both tracks, and Kōji Ueno handled their arrangements. For the release on PSP, new opening and ending themes sung by Yui Sakakibara were recorded. The opening theme is named "Toki no Nai Sekai" (時のない世界) and the ending theme is named "Distance".

12Riven was originally set to be released on December 6, 2007, but it was delayed to February 14, 2008. It was once again delayed further to its final release date on March 13, 2008. Both the standalone PC version and the bundled version with the Infinity Plus package was released on April 4, 2008.

== Reception ==
On its first week of release, 12Riven was the thirteenth best selling video game in Japan, and the third best selling PlayStation 2 game. By the end of 2009, the PlayStation Portable version was the 908th best selling video game of the year in Japan, with 4,745 copies sold.

Neal Chandran at RPGFan said that the Infinity series' atmosphere, story, setting, and themes had gotten progressively more sophisticated, dark, and deep with each installment. He felt that the music had followed this progression, and that 12Riven's music was among the most sophisticated music Abo had ever composed; he said that while there was nothing that stepped outside of Abo's comfort zone, the music was "highly refined".
