= Remember 11: The Age of Infinity =

2004 video game

- Cover art, featuring the main characters
- Developer: KID
- Publishers: KID (PS2); Success (PS2) (Note: As part of SuperLite 2000 series); Cyberfront (PSP, PC, mobile) (Note: Until 2014); Mages (PC) (Note: Since 2014)
- Director: Takumi Nakazawa
- Artist: Hidari
- Writers: Takumi Nakazawa; Kotaro Uchikoshi
- Composer: Takeshi Abo
- Series: Infinity
- Platforms: PlayStation 2; Microsoft Windows; PlayStation Portable; iOS; Android
- Release: March 18, 2004: PlayStation 2; JP: March 18, 2004 Microsoft Windows; JP: April 4, 2008 (Note: Initially released as part of the compilation Infinity Plus. A standalone physical version was released later in 2008. It was released digitally in 2011 by Cyberfront, and in 2014 by Mages.) PlayStation Portable; JP: April 16, 2009 iOS; JP: 2012 Android; JP: December 10, 2012
- Genre: Visual novel
- Mode: Single-player

Remember 11: The Age of Infinity is a visual novel video game developed by KID. It was originally released on March 18, 2004 for the PlayStation 2, and has later been ported to Microsoft Windows, PlayStation Portable, iOS, and Android. The game is the third entry in the Infinity series; it is preceded by Never 7 and Ever 17, and followed by the spin-off 12Riven and the reboot Code_18.

The game follows Fuyukawa Kokoro and Yukidoh Satoru, who frequently experience a phenomenon that makes their minds switch place with each other, putting them in the other person's body. Kokoro is stuck in a blizzard in an emergency cabin on a mountain together with three other people, while Satoru is in an institute for the treatment of mentally ill criminals, having lost his memory. The player takes the role of Kokoro, and reads the story while occasionally making choices that affect the course of the narrative, attempting to keep her alive for seven days; after doing so, they are able to play through the seven days from Satoru's perspective as well.

The development team included director Takumi Nakazawa, scenario writer Kotaro Uchikoshi, music composers Takeshi Abo and Chiyomaru Shikura, and character designer Hidari. The game was originally planned to be titled Parasite and be unrelated to the Infinity series, but when production started it was given the project name Project Infinity 3. Nakazawa and Uchikoshi had creative differences regarding the game's ending, each having their own idea for how the game should end; because of this and time constraints, the ending was left in an unfinished state, with the development team planning to develop a sequel. The game was positively received by reviewers at Famitsu and RPGFan, with the former complimenting the game system and plot, and the latter liking the character design and music.

== Gameplay ==
One of the options that affect the story; in this one, the player can choose whether or not to confront another character.

Remember 11 is a visual novel in which the player makes progress by reading the game's story. At certain points, they are able to pick one of a number of options, which affects the course of the game's story, leading to different endings. The game takes place over the course of seven days, and the goal is to make choices that keep the player characters alive. At first, the player can only play through the game as the character Fuyukawa Kokoro; (Note: Cocoro Fuyukawa (Japanese: 冬川こころ, Hepburn: Fuyukawa Kokoro)) after surviving a week as her, they also get to play as Yukidoh Satoru. (Note: Satoru Yukidoh (優希堂悟, Yūkidō Satoru)) Various terms used throughout the game are explained in a glossary, referred to as the "TIPS" system.

Throughout the game, a "personality transfer" phenomenon frequently causes Kokoro's and Satoru's minds to switch places with each other, leaving them in the other person's body. As the player only learns what their current character experiences, they need to play the game as both characters in order to access all information. Choices the player makes as one of the characters also affect what happens in a playthrough as the other; for instance, if the player chooses to drink water as Satoru, there will be no water left if they play through the game as Kokoro, and if they get into an argument with a character as Kokoro, their relationship to that character becomes strained when they play the game as Satoru.

== Plot ==
=== Setting and characters ===
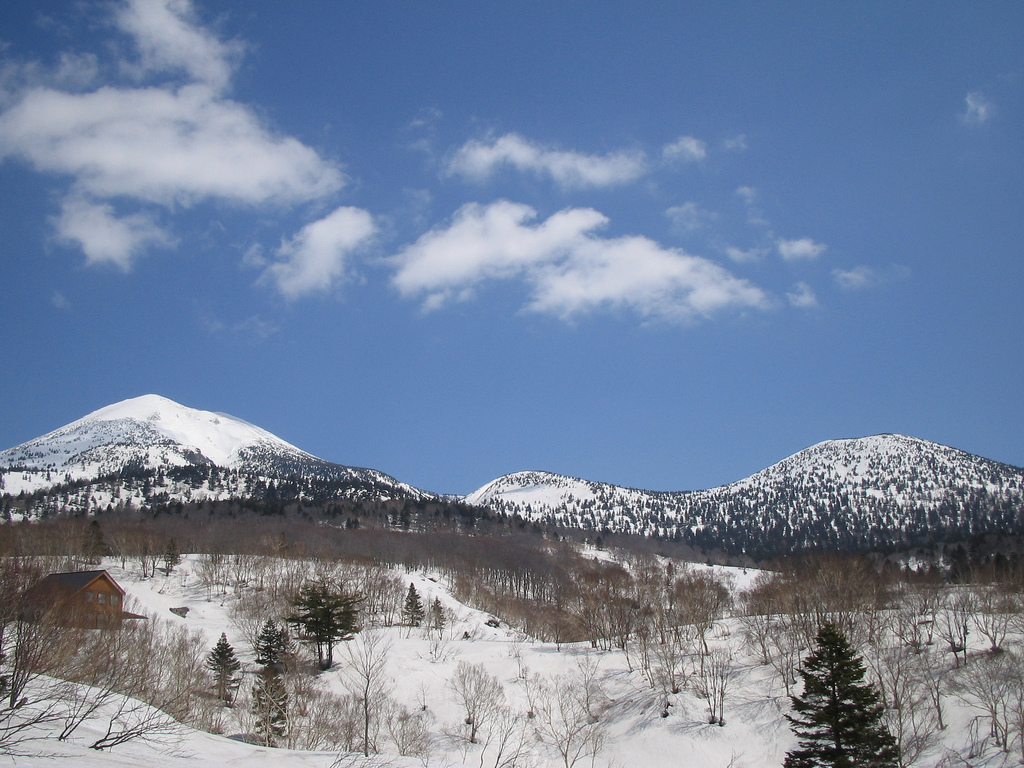
Part of the game takes place in the Hakkōda Mountains.

Remember 11 takes place in 2011 and 2012 concurrently, from January 11 to January 17, in two places in Japan: an emergency cabin on Mount Akakura in the Hakkōda mountain range, and the Specified Psychiatric Hospital for Isolation and Aegis (SPHIA) institution on the fictional island of Aosagi, in which mentally ill criminals are treated. The player takes the roles of Fuyukawa Kokoro, a third-year sociology major who is stranded on Akakura after surviving a plane crash, and Satoru Yukidoh, who lives in SPHIA and has lost his memory. Kusuda Yuni, (Note: Yuni Kusuda (楠田ゆに, Kusuda Yuni)) a young boy who survived the plane crash, appears in both the cabin and at SPHIA.

Among other survivors of the plane crash are Mayuzumi Lin, (Note: Lin Mayuzumi (黛鈴, Mayuzumi Rin)) a lawyer and the girlfriend of Satoru; and Yomogi Seiji, (Note: Seiji Yomogi (黄泉木聖司, Yomogi Seiji)) a professional mountain hiker. The player also encounters two characters at SPHIA: Utsumi Kali, (Note: Kali Utsumi (内海カーリー, Utsumi Kārī)) an elementary school teacher who is employed at SPHIA as a psychologist; and a girl assumed to have dissociative identity disorder, who has been confined at SPHIA since being acquitted of murder charges on grounds of insanity. While her birth records identify her as Inubushi Keiko, (Note: Keiko Inubushi (犬伏景子, Inubushi Keiko)) she claims to not recognize that name, and that her real name is "Suzukage Hotori"; (Note: Hotori Suzukage (涼蔭穂鳥, Suzukage Hotori)) this is the name of one of the passengers on the crashed plane.

=== Story ===
The game begins in 2011 with Kokoro traveling to SPHIA to interview Inubushi, when her plane experiences turbulence and crashes on Mount Akakura. Yuni and Yomogi get the unconscious Kokoro and Mayuzumi to an emergency cabin to take shelter from the blizzard. In 2012, Satoru falls from the SPHIA facility's clock tower and loses consciousness. Kokoro wakes up in a room and is relieved to find that Yuni is safe. Yuni does not recognize her; when looking at herself in a mirror, she sees a man's body. Similarly, Satoru wakes up in a woman's body. Both eventually switch back to their respective bodies, but the phenomenon continues, with their minds moving between their bodies; they conclude that their consciousnesses are transcending time and space. In the cabin, a news article dated July 4, 2011 is found, which says that Yuni was the only survivor, with the other three having died in an avalanche on January 17. Satoru finds a key in his room, but does not know what it unlocks.

As the week goes on, the people in the cabin are running out of food, while Satoru is subjected to multiple attempts on his life by an unknown assailant. As days pass, Satoru notices that he can see the same lunar phase at SPHIA and at the cabin and that both areas are surrounded by a body of water. It is revealed that the Yuni in the cabin is from the year 2012, while the Yuni at SPHIA is from 2011. Satoru finds a locked room in the basement of SPHIA, where he encounters a man named Enomoto, monitoring the facility through cameras. Enomoto tells Satoru that it is not consciousnesses that are transferred but the entire area within a 110-metre radius that is transported across time and space, with their consciousnesses left behind. Satoru attempts to destroy the facility, and Enomoto tries to stop him. A set of transfers occur, and Enomoto is killed by someone using Satoru's body.

Reviewing the camera footage, Satoru concludes that a third personality and location are part of the transfers. He leaves SPHIA and waits; the transfer occurs, and the third transfer point appears, in which there is a large cubical structure. The player can enter using the key from Satoru's room, or wait outside. If Satoru enters, he finds it empty except for a bed and a black sphere. The Enomoto of 2011 enters the structure, asking Satoru for his name; Satoru answers, after which Enomoto panics, saying that "the project" is ruined. He says that Satoru's memory has been transplanted from someone called "That Guy", that the sphere is the transfer device, and that the third transfer point is a relay between the mountain and the island, to level air pressure during transfers; he also reveals that this was where Utsumi was when she was hospitalized in 2011. Another person, who is identical to Satoru, enters and stabs Satoru. While Satoru dies, the killer calls the person thought to be Enomoto "Satoru", who in turn calls the killer "Enomoto".

If the player instead waits, the cabin gets transported to Aosagi Island. Yomogi, Mayuzumi, and Kokoro avoid the avalanche that was mentioned in the newspaper. The Yuni from 2011 is left at Akakura to be rescued by the rescue team in 2011, and to go to SPHIA in 2012 to repeat the loop, making sure that Kokoro, Yomogi, and Mayuzumi survive the week. Satoru reviews his theory regarding Inubushi; he thinks that she, too, was experiencing the transfer phenomenon, and that her consciousness ended up at Mount Akakura in the dying body of Hotori. He thinks the consciousness of Hotori inhabited Inubushi's body, rendering it free of homicidal tendencies, but realizes that since both his and Inubushi's consciousnesses remain at the island, Hotori cannot occupy Inubushi's body when he occupies his; Kokoro runs towards Inubushi, who is holding Utsumi's infant child over the edge of a cliff while singing. The game ends with Satoru meeting Mayuzumi, who says she does not recognize him.

== Development ==
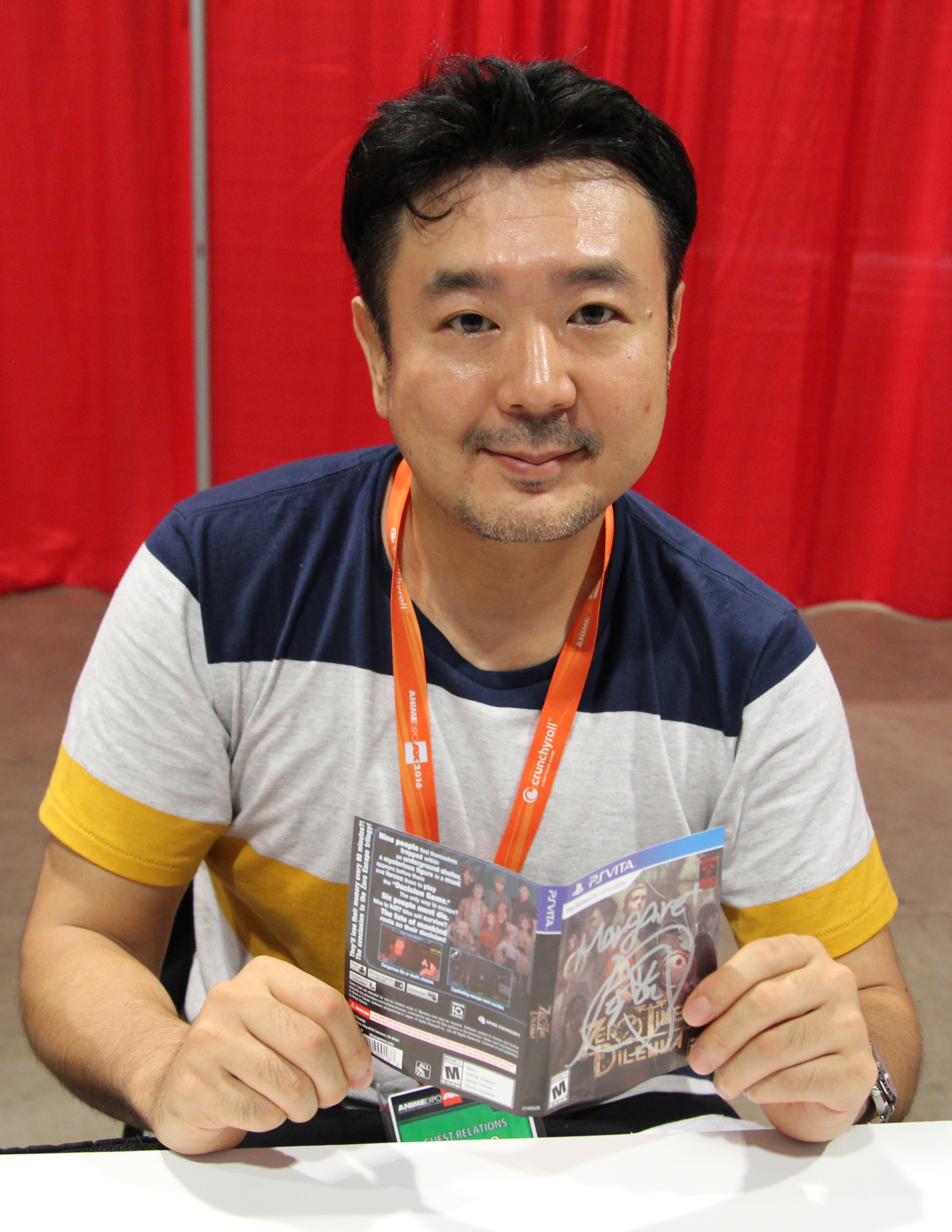
Development was troubled by creative differences between writer Kotaro Uchikoshi (pictured) and director Takumi Nakazawa.

The game was directed by Takumi Nakazawa, while Kotaro Uchikoshi was in charge of the scenario writing, and Hidari designed the characters. The game was originally conceived by Nakazawa in May 2002, at the end of the development of Ever17: The Out of Infinity; he planned the plot together with Uchikoshi in January 2003. The first game in the Infinity series, Never7: The End of Infinity, had a focus on dating, with light science fiction elements, but as the science fiction elements were positively received by reviewers, the series gradually moved away from the dating aspects; with Remember 11, the focus was entirely on science fiction, with no dating elements at all. Like other entries in the series, the game was designed to be open to speculation and multiple interpretations. Several characters in the game were based on Jungian archetypes: Kokoro and Satoru represent the anima and animus, respectively; Mayuzumi represents the persona; Yomogi represents the wise old man; Utsumi represents the great mother; Inubushi represents the shadow; and Yuni represents the trickster.

At first, the game was titled Parasite, and was meant to be unrelated to the Infinity series, but when development began in May 2003, it was codenamed Project Infinity 3. In September of the same year, they added the subtitle The Age of Infinity. Development was troubled by creative differences between Nakazawa and Uchikoshi; Nakazawa was unhappy with Uchikoshi's idea for the game's ending, and had a different ending in mind, which they were having disagreements over. They also did not have the time to write everything that they had wanted, so they ended up with an ending that Uchikoshi described as only being half-finished. In 2013, Uchikoshi looked back on the game, saying that while he would have liked to rewrite some portions of the scenario that he felt were boring or that did not advance the story much, he would not have changed or added anything in terms of the content of the game; he felt that his ending was still in the story, and still felt happy with it. In 2025 he stated that the game was incomplete and that if it were to be rereleased it would need to be reworked.

The game's soundtrack was composed by Takeshi Abo, and features "geometric music" because of the game's theoretical and science fiction elements. Prior to composing the music, he read through the game's story, to understand the setting and each character's personality as much as possible. He would write his impressions of the plot, with a focus on the "emotional flow" and the events that occur throughout the story; he valued his first impressions as very important for this. According to Abo, this method takes longer time, but allows him to make better music with a stronger relation to the game's world than if he had just designated different songs to different points of the game. Because he enjoyed the story, the music strongly reflects Abo's own musical tastes. The opening and ending themes, titled "Little Prophet" and "Darkness of Chaos", were composed by Chiyomaru Shikura; the opening was performed by Kaori. The PlayStation Portable version features new opening and ending themes, performed by Miyazaki Ui. They are titled "Uchū no Stencil" (Note: "Uchū no Stencil" (宇宙のステンシル, Uchū no Sutenshiru)) and "Kirenai Knife", (Note: "Kirenai Knife" (キレナイナイフ, Kirenai Naifu)) respectively.

== Release ==
Remember 11 was originally released for the PlayStation 2 on March 18, 2004, in both a standard and a limited edition; the latter included a booklet with material related to the game, and a "special voice CD". An updated version of the game, with seven new CG sequences added, was released by Success in 2005 as part of their budget series Superlite 2000. The game was later released for Microsoft Windows as a part of the Infinity Plus box set on April 4, 2008. It was also released for the PlayStation Portable on April 16, 2009, and for iOS in 2012.

Other media based on the game has been released. A novelization was published by Enterbrain in two parts: Remember 11 Ue Kokoro-hen on April 1, 2004, and Remember 11 Shita Satoru-hen on June 1, 2004. A music album with the game's soundtrack was released on March 24, 2004, by Scitron, with the title Remember 11: The Age of Infinity - Sound Collection. Another album, which features songs with vocals about or inspired by the game, was released with the title Remember 11: The Age of Infinity - Vocal Collection on September 23, 2004, also by Scitron. Scitron also released a drama CD based on the game on May 19, 2004.

== Reception ==
Reception

Review score
Publication	Score
Famitsu	7/10, 7/10, 7/10, 7/10

Remember 11 was the 16th best selling video game in Japan during its debut week. By the end of 2004, the game was the 393rd best selling game of the year in Japan, with 24,508 copies sold. By 2009, more than 40,000 copies had been sold across Microsoft Windows and PlayStation 2. At the end of 2009, the PlayStation Portable version was the 958th best selling game of the year in Japan, with 4,325 copies sold.

Reviewers at Famitsu commented on the user-friendliness of the game system, with its quick save function and shortcuts, and said that the game has enough to pull the player in until the end. Neal Chandran at RPGFan said that the Infinity series had become more and more interesting with each game. He called the character designs "excellent" and distinct from those in previous games in the series; he found it interesting that the character designs in previous games, which took place in "watery" settings, had brighter and less earthy colors, while Remember 11, which takes place in the mountains, makes more use of earthy colors.

Chandran also liked the game's soundtrack, calling it Abo's best work to date. He said that it is unmistakably the work of Abo, but improved over his previous soundtracks, and having "enough layers of experimentation to showcase musical growth" for it to not feel formulaic or like a rehash. He felt that the change in the series' setting was also reflected in the music, with the music's rhythm section being more noticeable and making the music feel more grounded, and with more use of "earthy sonic textures" compared to previous Infinity soundtracks' "watery" ones.
