= Infinity (video game series) =

- Cover for the Infinity Plus collection, featuring artwork from the first four games
- Genre: Visual novel
- Developers: KID, Cyberfront, SDR Project
- Publishers: JP: KID, Success, Cyberfront, 5pb.; NA: Hirameki International
- Creator: Takumi Nakazawa
- Writer: Kotaro Uchikoshi
- Composer: Takeshi Abo
- Platforms: Android, Dreamcast, iOS, Macintosh, Microsoft Windows, Neo Geo Pocket, PlayStation, PlayStation 2, PlayStation Portable, Xbox 360
- First release: Infinity; March 23, 2000
- Latest release: Ever 17 (remake); December 1, 2011

Infinity is a series of visual novel video games mainly developed by KID. The first game in the series, Never 7: The End of Infinity, was originally released as Infinity for PlayStation in 2000, and was later ported to other platforms. Since then, four more games have been developed, as well as a remake of the second game. The first three games were directed by Takumi Nakazawa, and the first four were planned and written by Kotaro Uchikoshi and composed for by Takeshi Abo. The fifth was written by the otome writing group Run & Gun, and featured sound production by the band Milktub. Alongside Memories Off, Infinity was KID's flagship series.

Initially the series focused on romance with a light use of science fiction themes; as the science fiction themes were positively received by reviewers, the series gradually moved away from the romance themes, with the third game focusing entirely on science fiction. Starting with the second game, the series has featured the theme of escaping from an enclosed space, which was used by the development team as a way of embodying humanity's instinctive desires. During the development of the fourth game, KID filed for bankruptcy; their assets were acquired by the company Cyberfront, which finished development of the fourth game and developed a fifth.

== Media ==
=== Main games ===
Release timeline
2000	Never 7: The End of Infinity
2001
2002	Ever 17: The Out of Infinity
2003
2004	Remember 11: The Age of Infinity
2005
2006
2007
2008	12Riven: The Psi-Climinal of Integral
2009
2010
2011	Code_18
2011	Ever 17 (remake)

The series consists of three video games, one spin-off, and one reboot. In Japan, the series has been published by KID, Success, and Cyberfront. In North America, the second game was localized and published by Hirameki International; this is the only game in the series to have been released in English.

- Never 7: The End of Infinity is the first game in the series. It was originally released for PlayStation on March 23, 2000, under the name Infinity, and was later released for Neo Geo Pocket, Dreamcast, Microsoft Windows, PlayStation 2, Macintosh computers, PlayStation Portable, Android, and iOS. The game follows Makoto, a student who spends a week in a lodge with other students and uses a sixth sense to prevent bad things from happening.
- Ever 17: The Out of Infinity is the second game in the series. It was originally released for PlayStation 2 and Dreamcast on August 29, 2002, and was later released for Microsoft Windows in both Japan and North America, and for PlayStation Portable, Android, and iOS. A remake was released for Xbox 360 on December 1, 2011. The game follows Takeshi and an amnesiac boy who, along with others, are trapped in an underwater theme park that is estimated to implode in 119 hours due to high water pressure.
- Remember 11: The Age of Infinity is the third game in the series. It was originally released for PlayStation 2 on March 18, 2004, and was later released for Microsoft Windows, PlayStation Portable, and iOS. It takes place in both 2011 and 2012, and follows Cocoro, who has survived a plane crash, and Satoru, who has lost consciousness after falling off a clock tower.
- 12Riven: The Psi-Climinal of Integral is a spin-off to the Infinity series, and the first and only game in the Integral series. It was originally released for PlayStation 2 on March 13, 2008, and was later released for Microsoft Windows and PlayStation Portable. It follows Renmaru, who is headed to the Integral building after hearing that his friend Myu will die there, and Narumi, who also heads to the building to save Myu and to prevent an event from happening.
- Code_18 is the first and only game in a reboot of the Infinity series with different writers. It was originally released for Xbox 360 and PlayStation Portable on September 29, 2011, with a Microsoft Windows version following on December 21, 2012. It is set in a high school in 2018, and follows the second-year student Hayato, who tries to get his Dragon Mk-7Va unit into flight.

=== Other media ===
Other media based on the series has been made. Ever 17 has been adapted into a manga, and Remember 11 has received a novelization in two parts. A promotional mobile game based on Code_18 was published prior to the release of Code_18. Drama CDs based on Ever 17, Remember 11, and Code_18 have been made.

== Common elements ==
A scene in the cabin in Remember 11, with one of the options that affect the story.

The games are all visual novels with stories about time travel and with science fiction elements, featuring time loops as a recurring plot element. Starting with Ever 17, the series has featured the theme of "an escape from an enclosed space"; for instance, Ever 17 has characters trapped in an underwater theme park, and Remember 11 is set both in a cabin on a mountain during a blizzard and in a facility for the rehabilitation of mentally ill criminals. Never 7 can also be considered to fit this theme, as its protagonist is unable to leave an isolated island due to rough weather conditions. This theme was abandoned with Code_18, which instead is set in a school. Also starting with Ever 17, the series has featured multiple protagonists for each game, that the player can play through the story as; this, too, was abandoned with Code_18, which features one protagonist.

The player makes progress in the games by reading their stories. At certain points, they are presented with a number of options; depending on which one they pick, the story progresses differently, leading to different endings. Some of these choices affect subtle things such as whether the player character should take another character's hand or to look them in the eyes, while some can cause the death of a character; the player aims to avoid "bad" endings in which the player character or another character dies. Several of the games in the series include an in-game glossary referred to as the "TIPS" system, which explains various terms used in the story.

== Development ==
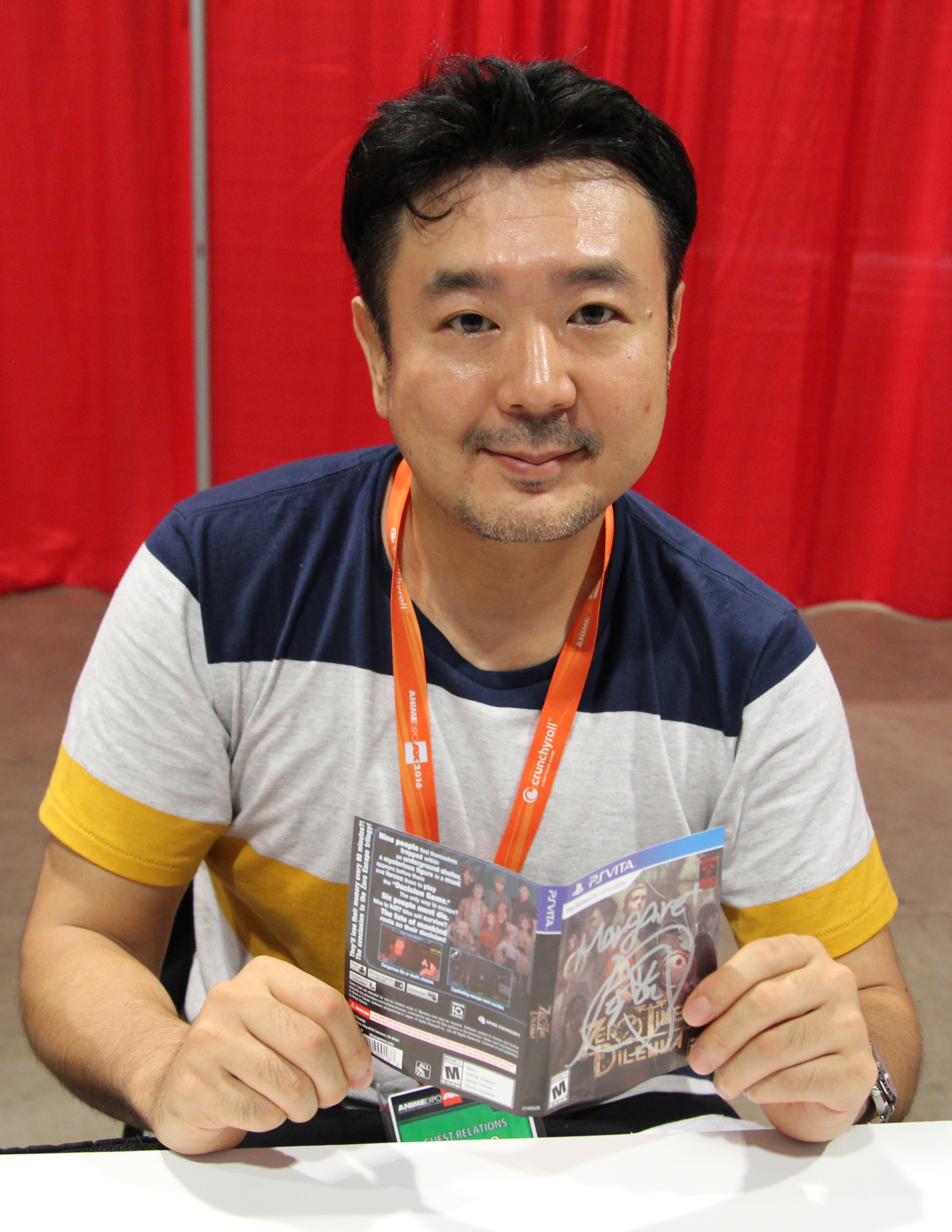
The first four games in the series were written and planned by Kotaro Uchikoshi.

The first three games in the series were directed by Takumi Nakazawa, and the first four were written and planned by Kotaro Uchikoshi and composed for by Takeshi Abo. Several artists have worked on the character design for the series, including Yuu Takigawa for Ever 17 and Hidari for Remember 11. Along with Memories Off, Infinity was KID's flagship series.

Uchikoshi was unable to make heavy use of science fiction themes in Never 7, as his superiors at KID thought the game would not sell well if it did not focus on dating game elements and cute female characters, so it was made with the main focus of developing a relationship with a girl, with light science fiction elements. At release, the science fiction elements were well received by reviewers, which led to the decision to increase the science fiction focus in later games; this was done gradually, with the second game, Ever 17, having a balance between dating and science fiction, and the third game, Remember 11, entirely focusing on science fiction. According to Uchikoshi, the series' theme of "an escape from an enclosed space" was intended to embody two of humanity's instinctive and primitive desires: the unconscious desire to return to the safety of one's mother's womb and shut oneself away from the world, and the desire to escape and overcome one's current condition. Another recurring theme for the series was how the games were designed to be open for speculation and multiple interpretations, which was part of why the series was named Infinity.

When Abo composed the games' music, he first read the stories, so that he could understand the setting and characters fully. While doing this, he wrote down his impressions of the various events and situations that occur throughout the games. The things he considered the most important were the emotional flow of the stories, and his first impressions. He described this method as taking longer than if he just were to designate various songs to different points in the game, but said that it allowed him to create music with a better relation to the worldview of the games. Because of the series' science fiction and theoretical elements, Abo composed with what he refers to as "geometric music" in mind. As he enjoyed the stories, the music he composed strongly reflected his own musical tastes.

Development of the first game began right after Memories Off was finished, which was Uchikoshi's first visual novel. Never 7 was planned as a stand-alone game, but it was decided during the development of Ever 17 to connect the two games' worlds and turn them into a series. Development of Ever 17 was finished in May 2002, at which point Nakazawa came up with ideas for Remember 11; he and Uchikoshi planned the game's plot in January 2003, initially intending for the game to be unrelated to Infinity and to be titled Parasite. When development began in May 2003, however, it was given the project name of Project Infinity 3. Production of the title was troubled by creative differences between Nakazawa and Uchikoshi, who each had their own idea for the game's ending. In addition to their disagreements, they were unable to write everything they had wanted for the game, and ended up with an ending that Uchikoshi described as only being half-finished; at the time of the game's release, they planned to finish the story in a sequel.

KID started development of a fourth game, 12Riven, and planned to release it in 2007; however, on December 1, 2006, KID filed for bankruptcy due to debts of 530 million yen; this was due to KID having continued to release games for the PlayStation 2 throughout 2006 with dwindling sales, which was thought to be due to the success of the Nintendo DS in Japan. According to Abo, the company's employees were unaware of the problems until the very day KID closed down. In 2007, the company Cyberfront acquired all of KID's assets, and announced that development of 12Riven had been resumed; it was released in 2008, with development credited to both KID and SDR Project. The fifth game, Code_18, was developed by Cyberfront; as KID no longer existed, the otome writing group Run & Gun was hired to write the game's story. Meanwhile, sound production was done by the band Milktub. The development team saw the game as a reboot of the Infinity series, and despite initially planning otherwise, moved away from the "escape from an enclosed space" theme due to concerns of the size of the game's audience. Cyberfront also developed a remake of Ever 17, in collaboration with 5pb., using 3D models for the characters rather than the 2D sprites of the original version. In February 2023, Mages Inc. director Makoto Asada revealed that early planning was in progress to potentially produce new remakes of the series.

== Reception ==
Famitsu review scores
Game	Famitsu
Never 7: The End of Infinity	26/40
Ever 17: The Out of Infinity	26/40
Remember 11: The Age of Infinity	28/40
12Riven: The Psi-Climinal of Integral	N/A
Code_18	26/40
Ever 17 (remake)	30/40

In 2010, RPGFan ranked Ever 17 as the 18th best role-playing game of the 2000s; editor Neal Chandran ranked it as number 3 in his "editor's pick" portion of the same feature.

=== Sales ===
By November 2011, total sales for the series were over 200,000.

=== Legacy ===
Uchikoshi cited the positive reception of Never 7 and Ever 17 as what gave him the confidence to leave KID and become a freelance writer.
