= Takumi Nakazawa =

Japanese writer

Takumi Nakazawa (中澤 工, Nakazawa Takumi) (born November 19, 1976) is a Japanese video game writer and founder of the visual novel publishing company Regista. He worked at KID from 1998 until 2004, leaving to form Regista after the release of Remember 11: The Age of Infinity. As of 2017, he now works at Too Kyo Games.

== Works ==
=== Video games ===
Year	Title	Role
1997	Can Can Bunny Extra	Planning assistant
1999	Kiss yori...	Planner, planning, coordinating manager
1999	Memories Off	Director
2000	Never 7: The End of Infinity	Director
2000	Meitantei Conan: 3 Nin no Meisuiri	Script
2001	Close To: Inori no Oka	Director, scenario
2001	Memories Off 2nd	Director, scenario
2002	Subete ga F ni Naru	Scenario writer
2002	Ever 17: The Out of Infinity	Director, scenario, movie
2004	Remember 11: The Age of Infinity	Director, scenario
2006	I/O	Director, producer, scenario, public relations
2007	Myself; Yourself	Director, producer, planning, story supervisor
2008	Secret Game: Killer Queen	Director
2009	Myself; Yourself: Sorezore no Finale	Director, producer, planning, story supervisor
2010	Himawari: Pebble in the Sky Portable	Director
2012	Root Double: Before Crime * After Days	Director
2013	Rebellions: Secret Game 2nd Stage	Director
2016	Punch Line	Director
2020	Death Come True	Scenario assistant
2020	World's End Club	Director, scenario assistant
2022	AI: The Somnium Files - nirvanA Initiative	Scenario assistant
2025	Tribe Nine	TBA
2025	The Hundred Line: Last Defense Academy	Production assistant
2025	Shuten Order	Director, scenario, story supervisor

=== Light novels ===
Year	Title	Role
2007	Myself ; Yourself Sorezore Overture	Writer
