= Ever 17: The Out of Infinity =

Japanese science fiction visual novel

- North American cover art, featuring (clockwise from top) Coco, Sora, Tsugumi, Sara, and You
- Developer: KID: Cyberfront (remake); 5pb. (remake)
- Publishers: KID: JP: Success (PS2) (Note: As part of SuperLite 2000 series); JP: Cyberfront (PSP, mobile); NA: Hirameki (PC); Remake; JP: Cyberfront, 5pb. (360); JP: Mages (NS, PS4); WW: Spike Chunsoft
- Directors: Takumi Nakazawa; Kazuhiro Ichikawa (remake); Yuusuke Matsumoto (remake)
- Producer: Chiyomaru Shikura (remake)
- Artist: Yuu Takigawa
- Writers: Kotaro Uchikoshi; Takumi Nakazawa; Kitaro Sasanari; Nobuaki Umeda
- Composer: Takeshi Abo
- Series: Infinity
- Platforms: Dreamcast; PlayStation 2; Microsoft Windows; PlayStation Portable; Android; iOS; Xbox 360; Nintendo Switch; PlayStation 4
- Release: August 29, 2002: Dreamcast, PlayStation 2; JP: August 29, 2002 Microsoft Windows; JP: May 16, 2003; NA: December 20, 2005 PlayStation Portable; JP: March 12, 2009 Android, iOS; JP: January 15, 2013 Remake Xbox 360; JP: December 1, 2011 NS, PS4, Windows; WW: March 6, 2025
- Genre: Visual novel
- Mode: Single-player

Ever 17: The Out of Infinity is a visual novel video game developed by KID. It is the second entry in the Infinity series; it is preceded by Never 7: The End of Infinity, and followed by Remember 11: The Age of Infinity, the spin-off 12Riven: The Psi-Climinal of Integral, and the reboot Code_18. It was originally released in Japan on August 29, 2002, for the PlayStation 2 and Dreamcast, and was later ported to Microsoft Windows, PlayStation Portable, Android, and iOS. A localization of the Microsoft Windows version was released by Hirameki International in North America in 2005.

The game follows Takeshi Kuranari and a boy with amnesia who is referred to as "the Kid", who are trapped inside an underwater theme park together with a group of other people after a leak has flooded parts of the park; they cannot contact people on the surface, and due to high water pressure, the park is estimated to implode after 119 hours. The gameplay consists of the player reading the game's story, at certain points making choices that affect its direction, leading to one of several possible endings.

The development team included director Takumi Nakazawa, writer and planner Kotaro Uchikoshi, character designer Yuu Takigawa, and composer Takeshi Abo. Because the science fiction aspects of Never 7 had been positively received, Ever 17 was made with a larger focus on science fiction. The game has been positively received, with reviewers calling it one of the best in its genre, citing its story, characters, music, and graphics.

A remake, simply titled Ever 17, was developed by 5pb. and Cyberfront for Xbox 360 in 2011. It features various changes to the story and the characters, additional illustrations by Takigawa, and new music arrangements by Abo. The original visual novel's 2D sprites were replaced by 3D models; this change was done as 3D models were seen as being easier to animate. A remaster that uses the remake as the basis, but brings back the 2D visuals, released worldwide for Nintendo Switch, PlayStation 4, and Windows on March 6, 2025, again with The Out of Infinity subtitle.

== Gameplay ==
Throughout the game, the player makes choices that affect the plot.

Ever 17 is a visual novel in which the player reads the game's story. At certain points, they get to make a choice, which affects the direction of the story, leading to eleven possible different endings. The whole plot is not revealed in just one ending; instead, the player has to play through the game multiple times, with each playthrough revealing new information. After playing through the game once, the player is able to fast-forward past text to decision points; they can also choose to start from a point further into the game, so that they do not have to go back to the beginning of the game for each playthrough.

The game has two player characters: Takeshi Kuranari (Note: Takeshi Kuranari (Japanese: 倉成 武, Hepburn: Kuranari Takeshi)) and the Kid. (Note: The Kid (少年, Shōnen)) Depending on the character the player plays as, they get to build relationships with different characters: for instance, the player can become close to Tsugumi Komachi (Note: Tsugumi Komachi (小町 つぐみ, Komachi Tsugumi)) when playing as Takeshi, who just is a supporting character when playing as the Kid. The player character is not chosen directly; instead, a decision the player makes during a blackout in the beginning of the game determines who they will play as.

== Plot ==
=== Setting and characters ===
Ever 17 is set in Japan, in the underwater marine theme park LeMU, 51 meters below the surface of the artificial island Insel Null. After an incident, almost half of LeMU is flooded, and the path to the surface and the communication lines are cut off, trapping the game's characters inside. In addition, LeMU is under large water pressure, limiting time to find a means of escape to 119 hours.

The player takes the roles of two characters, and sees the story from their respective perspectives: Takeshi Kuranari, a student who visited the park with his friends but got separated from them; and an amnesiac boy who does not remember his own name, and is simply called "the Kid". Among other characters are You Tanaka, (Note: You Tanaka (田中 優, Tanaka Yū)) a part-time employee at LeMU; Tsugumi Komachi, a woman who is distrustful of the others; Sora Akanegasaki, (Note: Sora Akanegasaki (茜ヶ崎 空, Akanegasaki Sora)) an artificial intelligence and the computer engineer of LeMU, who is only seen through a projection onto the other characters' eyes; Sara Matsunaga, (Note: Sara Matsunaga (松永 沙羅, Matsunaga Sara)) a second-year student and a hacker; and Coco Yagami, (Note: Coco Yagami (八神 ココ, Yagami Koko)) a girl who is stranded on LeMU with her dog Pipi.

=== Story ===
The game opens on May 1, 2017, when a blackout occurs in LeMU, its communications system go down, and the park springs a leak; portions of it get flooded, blocking the exit and trapping the characters. Due to water pressure, the park is estimated to implode after 119 hours. The pressure also prevents escape by swimming, as it would crush one's lungs.

If the player plays as Takeshi, he builds a relationship with Tsugumi, who reveals that she and her pet hamster Chami are carriers of the Cure virus, which has rewritten their genetic code and halted their biological aging. She and Takeshi have sex, and she becomes pregnant. Later, Coco becomes sick. It is revealed that LeMU was created by the Leiblich Pharmaceutical company as a cover for IBF, a research facility underneath the park. IBF developed the deadly virus Tief Blau, and the LeMU disaster was caused when IBF lost containment of it. Coco was exposed to the virus while visiting her father, an IBF researcher.

The group goes to IBF in search for a cure, but starts showing signs of Tief Blau. An exception is Tsugumi, as the Cure virus has made her immune; the group injects themselves with her antibodies. They get contact with the surface, and a rescue pod is sent down, but is only able to stay for a short time. Tsugumi leaves to find Chami, who has gone missing; Takeshi chases after her, and saves Sora's data onto a disk to save her memories. Returning to IBF, they have missed the rescue vessel. They find a submarine and escape, but its batteries die; Takeshi exits it, giving it enough buoyancy to save Tsugumi, while he drowns on the ocean floor. Coco dies in IBF, as she had been looking for Pipi, and the rescue team could not find her.

If the player plays as the Kid, Sara is trapped in LeMU instead of Coco; the Kid frequently has visions of Coco, but no one else sees her. The group manages to contact the surface, and open and close doors to rooms in LeMU to move the water around, allowing them to escape.

After having played the game as both Takeshi and the Kid, the player accesses the final route, where it is revealed that although the events Takeshi experienced took place in 2017, those the Kid experienced were a recreation, and took place in a rebuilt LeMU in 2034. The You of 2017, whose full first name is Yubiseiharukana, (Note: Yubiseiharukana (優美清春香菜, Yūbiseiharukana)) had artificially impregnated herself and given birth to Yubiseiakikana, (Note: Yubiseiakikana (優美清秋香菜, Yūbiseiakikana)) who took the role of You during the recreation. Pipi had escaped LeMU in 2017, carrying with it the disk with Sora's memories and footage of Coco being trapped in IBF. Sara and the Kid are revealed to be Tsugumi and Takeshi's children, and the Kid's real name turns out to be Hokuto. (Note: Hokuto (ホクト)) The Kid of 2017, whose name is Ryogo Kaburaki, (Note: Ryogo Kaburaki (桑古木涼権, Kaburaki Ryōgo)) played the role of Takeshi during the recreation, having stopped aging due to the Cure virus.

The recreation was done to line up two points in the fourth dimension, time, to get the attention of the person playing Ever 17; the characters see the player as a 4th-dimensional being, "Blick Winkel", who can move through time; Blick Winkel appearing was what caused Hokuto's amnesia. Yubiseiharukana tells Blick Winkel that they had told her to perform the recreation to save Takeshi and Coco. Blick Winkel travels to 2017, and wakes up Takeshi on the seafloor, forcing him to swim to IBF; inside, he injects Coco with Tsugumi's antibodies. Blick Winkel warns Yubiseiharukana in 2017 to not save Takeshi and Coco immediately, to avoid a time paradox; instead, Blick Winkel has Takeshi and Coco enter cryogenic suspension in IBF. They wake up in 2034, saved. Sora, who now has a robotic body, is given back her memories from the disk, and Yubiseiharukana leaks information about Leiblich, exposing them as the ones behind the Tief Blau outbreak.

== Development ==
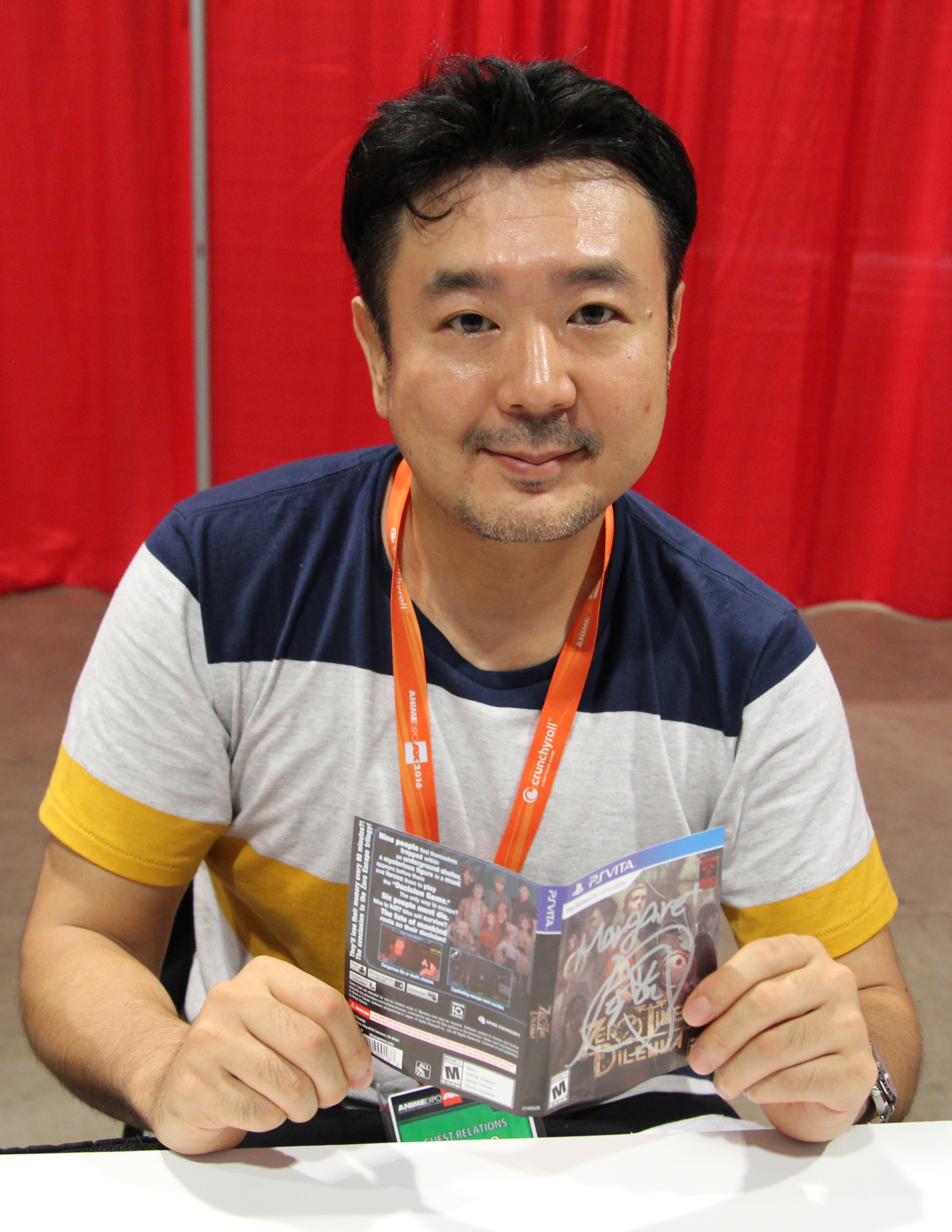
The game was written and planned by Kotaro Uchikoshi.

The game was developed by KID, with direction by Takumi Nakazawa, planning and scenario writing by Kotaro Uchikoshi, character design by Yuu Takigawa, and music by Takeshi Abo. Nakazawa and Uchikoshi were appointed to their respective positions as they had worked on the previous game in the Infinity series, Never 7: The End of Infinity, which had been well received. As Ever 17 was to be released on consoles, it was required to be finished two months before the planned August release, meaning that after the scenario's completion in May, there was only time for debugging until late June. Uchikoshi and Nakazawa described this as a tight development schedule, and said that the game was only possible through the staff working very hard, and a lot of things being worked on at the same time.

=== Writing ===
Uchikoshi, who was freelancing at the time, came up with the original concept and pitch for the game after having started to research material in August 2001, including the Russian mathematician P. D. Ouspensky's book Tertium Organum. A month later, he took a trip to Bali, from which he got a lot of inspiration for the story. As he was getting ready to return to Japan, he saw live news coverage of the September 11 attacks; because the game's plot was conceived during this time, Uchikoshi said that the story was influenced by the "spirit of the time" following the attacks. He wrote it from September until February the next year, after which the story was divided among the scenario writers, who wrote the script over the course of three months, from March to May 2002.

The writing team included Nakazawa, who wrote You's route and the Kid's common route; Nakazawa's assistant Kitaro Sasanari, who wrote Tsugumi and Sora's routes; Nobuaki Umeda, who wrote Sara's route; and Uchikoshi, who wrote Coco's route. The writing process for all routes were supervised by Uchikoshi, in an effort to eliminate inconsistencies in the setting or characters, and plot holes between the different parts of the story. Because he was running out of time at the end, he had to rush the writing of the end of Coco's route, which he described as possibly his only regret with the game. Nakazawa wrote his parts in between his directorial work, such as writing specification documents, supervising the production, and doing quality control work; due to the lack of time, he ended up having to stay overnight at KID everyday and work through the night, something he said was only possible because of how young he was at the time. Nakazawa described himself as working particularly hard on the game because he felt bitter that Never 7 had not sold particularly well.

When writing the story, Uchikoshi made use of what he calls the "inductive composition method", where a setting is created first, after which one thinks about a core to the story that can be used to make the setting work. He did not recommend this way of writing, as he saw it as gamble that might not have resulted in an interesting story. This is in contrast to the deductive composition method, where a core story is thought of first, after which a setting is "deduced", that matches the core. As an example of inductive composition used, Uchikoshi did not initially think up the story's "main trick", and instead created two protagonists only because he thought it was getting stale with single-protagonist stories in visual novels, after which he thought about how to make two protagonists interesting. The writers only put little effort into hiding the 17-year gap between the Kid's and Takeshi's routes, writing each day of the story casually without a particular plan in mind. Rather, it took special effort to make it seem convincing when the game's secrets were revealed, with hints toward the truth added throughout the story, such as Tsugumi acting more suspicious when playing as the Kid due to having already experienced the events of Takeshi's route, or slight differences between the Kid's and Takeshi's routes due to the characters not being able to perfectly recreate events. While Coco was planned from the beginning as the character who knew the truth, Uchikoshi did not come up with the idea of leaving her on the bottom of the ocean until during the writing of the script.

Another example of the inductive composition method was the creation of the game's title, which was only decided on after the story was completed. It was meant to reflect how the game's story connects the future and the past, with the word "ever" intended to be read with two meanings: "once before" and "someday", but the number "17" was initially simply chosen as Uchikoshi liked the number due to being born on the 17th, and because he liked the transition to "17" from the "7" in Never 7; upon checking the calendar for year spans where dates and days of the week would line up, he found that one such occurrence was the seventeen years between 2017 and 2034; other spans included eleven years, which was too short, and twenty-eight, which was too long. When Uchikoshi considered how to bring characters over from 2017 to 2034, some worked out naturally: Tsugumi was immortal due to being infected with the Curé Virus, You had a clone in 2034, and Sora was an artificial intelligence. He could not come up with a way to make Coco and Sara appear in both 2017 and 2034, but thought that the player probably would not figure it out just from this discrepancy. The one character left was Kaburaki, who would be a teenager in 2017 but in his 30s in 2034; Uchikoshi solved this by infecting him with the Curé Virus, which then led to him making the rest of the 2017 cast infected as well.

The character routes were divided between Takeshi and the Kid according to what made sense for the plot, rather than in an effort to pair up the player characters with specific female characters. Although the routes were given a recommended playing order, this did not occur until around the time the scenario was finished. According to Nakazawa, bad endings were painful to write, but were included both as foils to the good ending to increase the sense of accomplishment in reaching the good ending, and as "what if?" events that give the story variety, showing what would have happened had events played out differently. The game's epilogue was not originally planned, but was written by Uchikoshi in three days after being advised by Nakazawa. When a PlayStation Portable version was developed, Nakazawa was asked to create new content for it; as it would have been hard to expand the story or add new event computer graphics artwork (CGs), it was decided to create an in-game dictionary explaining terms used to allow players to enjoy the game on a deeper level.

==== Themes and influences ====
Uchikoshi described the game's theme as "thinking of concepts and themes". With Ever 17, the series saw the start of a shift from Never 7's focus on romance with only light use of science fiction themes to a more balanced use of the two, a shift that would continue in the entirely science fiction-based third game in the series, Remember 11: The Age of Infinity. Although Uchikoshi planned Ever 17 as part of the same series, it was initially proposed as a game "following the tradition" of Never 7 rather than as a direct sequel to it. Never 7 had been planned as a stand-alone game, but during Ever 17's development it was decided to connect the two games' worlds, when Uchikoshi wrote details of the plot and used keywords relating to Never 7. Intending to make Ever 17 similar to but distinct from Never 7, the developers referenced series where different entries were of different genres, such as Koji Suzuki's novels Ring, Spiral and Loop, and films like The Terminator and Terminator 2: Judgment Day and Alien and Aliens. Uchikoshi was additionally influenced by the film Frequency, for the portrayal of the scene where Takeshi and Hokuto communicate. They also included elements meant to mislead people who had previously played Never 7, such as the misleading implication that a Never 7-like time travel occurred after Takeshi's routes, leading to the Kid's, and elements meant to feel nostalgic, such as names and terms from Never 7.

The concept for using an underwater theme park as the game's setting came from a conversation Uchikoshi had with a friend, who mentioned it being nice to be in Disneyland parks when it is raining, as very few people are there then, making it feel like the park is reserved to oneself. Uchikoshi agreed that empty theme parks are nice, and considered setting the game in an empty theme park on land, but moved it underwater after realizing that the characters could escape by climbing the fence and that some further obstacle was needed. This setting, described by Uchikoshi as "you're trapped somewhere and trying to escape", was made to embody two of humanity's instinctive desires: the unconscious desire to return to the safety of one's mother's womb and shut oneself away from the world, and the desire to escape from and overcome one's current condition. German elements were used a lot in the game's setting, including German terminology. This was decided on for multiple reasons: the developers thought that English was "too ordinary", and when they decided to use the pharmaceutical company Leiblich in the story, they also thought that Germany and Switzerland were known for pharmaceuticals. Additionally, Uchikoshi had visited Germany and was influenced by the 1999 animated film Jin-Roh: The Wolf Brigade, and how the friend he had the theme park conversation with spoke German. Each of the game's heroines were assigned a related attraction in the park, where their "impactful events" would occur. The one exception was Coco, as "her speech and conduct was already as delightful as an attraction".

The game's two player characters, Takeshi and Hokuto, were created as opposites: Takeshi was made assertive, optimistic, and hot-blooded, while Hokuto was introverted, negative, and cowardly; Takeshi had a past but not a future due to sleeping at the bottom of the sea, while Hokuto had forgotten his past and lived for the future; and Takeshi lived in the past, while Hokuto lived in the future. The concept of Blick Winkel came from how Uchikoshi's first visual novel, Memories Off, was criticized by players, who said that he did not understand that in bishoujo games, the protagonist is the player. The phrase "The protagonist of bishoujo games is the player themselves" stuck with him due to the impact the criticism had on him, leading to Blick Winkel's creation.

Sora was planned as an artificial intelligence from the start, but because Uchikoshi thought robots seemed cliché, and holograms could not move around to different places, he came up with the idea of her being an image shot onto people's eyes with a laser; thinking that if a layman like himself could come up with the idea of such technology, an expert in the field could have been working on developing it already, so he researched it and found out about retinal scanning display technology, and made use of it in the game's story. The full names of both the original You and her clone were taken from a name dictionary, and were initially challenged by KID's marketing team, who thought they sounded "lame"; they relented after Nakazawa explained that the names had a meaning and could not be changed. Because Uchikoshi liked the film Interview with the Vampire, he conceived Tsugumi as being a vampire; the staff did not like this idea, so it was scrapped, but the concept of her being immortal was kept, which led to the introduction of the Curé Virus in the story, as Uchikoshi considered the spreading of vampirism similar to a virus. Another remnant of the vampire concept was kept in Sara, who has infrared vision and can see in the dark. Sara was noted by Uchikoshi as being the otherwise single normal person in the cast, offsetting the balance; because of this, she was made into the Kid's twin sister.

=== Visuals ===
Takigawa was chosen to design the game's characters on recommendation of KID's PR staff, who got along well with Takigawa's friend and fellow character designer Chisato Naruse. In addition to designing the characters, Takigawa was in charge of creating the game's key visual, which was both used as promotional material representing the game as a whole, and as reference material for in-game event graphics; Takigawa drew the game's heroines in an underwater environment.

The event CGs were decided by Nakazawa based on the game's plot and script, and written down in a specification document given to the art team. Because this was done before the scenario was completely finished, there were some places that he when looking at the scenario as a whole realized would have benefited more from a CG than some of the passages that did get one, despite how he updated the specification document every so often throughout the development. Because of this, it was decided to add more CGs to several scenes for the game's "Premium Edition" re-release. A challenge in creating the CGs was that the art team did not understand the game's main plot twist, resulting in several finished CGs with mistakes that a person who does not know about the twist would not have noticed, that had to be fixed. For the background art, inspiration was drawn from the films Cube and The Abyss and the video game Resident Evil.

The opening movie to Ever 17 was created by the game's producer, who picked out CGs and keywords from the game to include. Nakazawa gave instructions to have the characters appear in the same order as the recommended route playing order the developers had decided on, hoping for the order to leave an impression and influence players to play the game in that order. The ending movie was created by Nakazawa, who was not used to the tools used in video creation. He added a timeline to the credits roll, intending for it to feel emotional to get an overview of the story after having finished it, and finding it fitting to have a timeline scrolling along with the calm ending theme. For the PlayStation Portable version, the creation of a new opening movie was outsourced to a video design company, chosen specifically for one designer working there. Nakazawa sent them instructions on what text and graphics to use, and they created an animatic based on it, before adding the details. The ending movie for this version was created by the publisher, Cyberfront, without Nakazawa's involvement.

=== Audio ===
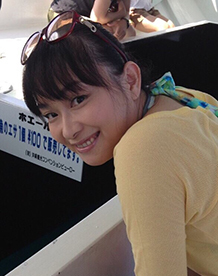
Asami Imai performed the PlayStation Portable version's opening theme.

During the voice recording, two characters posed problems: You, as she had the by far most lines of any character in the game, causing her voice actor, Noriko Shitaya, to get exhausted from how much she had to speak; and Sora, whose long lines with difficult terms were a challenge for her voice actor, Hiroko Kasahara.

For the music, Nakazawa and the game's producer determined the number and variety of tracks based on the budget and the game's content, and told Abo what kind of music they were imagining for the game. Sasanari was knowledgeable in music, so he helped Nakazawa with discussing the soundtrack. When composing the soundtrack, Abo used what he described as "geometric music" because of the theoretical and science fiction elements. Prior to composing the music, he read through the game's story, to understand the setting and each character's personality as much as possible. He would write his impressions of the plot, with a focus on the "emotional flow" and the events that occur throughout the story; he valued his first impressions as very important for this. According to Abo, this method takes longer time, but allows him to make better music with a stronger relation to the game's world than if he had just designated different songs to different points of the game. Because he enjoyed the story, the music strongly reflects Abo's own musical tastes.

After writing down rules about how the music was to be used, such as specific scenes certain songs should be used in, or ways a certain song should not be used, the game's scripters implemented the music at points they found fitting. During debugging, Nakazawa would request fixes for songs that he did not think fit the scenes they were used in. For the PlayStation Portable release, Asami Imai performed the opening theme.

== Release ==
Ever 17 was originally released for Dreamcast and PlayStation 2 on August 29, 2002, in Japan. A Microsoft Windows version was released on May 16, 2003, in Japan, and was localized and released by Hirameki International on December 20, 2005, in North America. The game was also released for PlayStation Portable on March 12, 2009, and for Android and iOS on January 15, 2013. The PlayStation Portable version of the game was the 744th best selling game of 2009 in Japan, with 7,482 copies sold.

Other media based on the game has been published. A music album with the game's soundtrack, titled Ever 17: The Out of Infinity – Sound Collection, was released by Scitron on September 4, 2002. Scitron released another album, Ever 17: The Out of Infinity – Vocal Collection, on August 6, 2003, which collects singles previously released during a two-year period. The album includes two vocal tracks from the game, instrumental versions of them, and songs based on the events and characters of the game. A drama CD titled 2035 was released on December 18, 2002, also by Scitron. A manga adaptation of the game was drawn by Chigusa Umetani and released by Enterbrain on their Famitsu Comic Clear website from 2011 to 2012; it has since been collected in two volumes. A book, titled Ever 17 10th Anniversary Fanbook, was released at 2012's winter edition of Comiket, and included new art by Takigawa.

=== Remake ===
The remake features 3D models rather than 2D sprites, to make character animation easier.

A remake of the game, simply titled Ever 17, was developed for Xbox 360 by 5pb. in collaboration with Cyberfront. It was originally planned to be released on July 28, 2011, but was delayed to December 1, 2011. It was made available in both a standard edition and a limited edition, the latter including a 2-disc soundtrack. The remake was redone from the ground up, and includes new event graphics, re-recorded voices, new routes, and a new ending. It uses 3D models for the conversation scenes; this move from 2D to 3D was made as 3D character models were seen as easier to animate than 2D sprites, as they can be posed without the need to draw new poses manually. The setting was redesigned, with newly added facilities, and Tsugumi was given redesigned clothes.

5pb.'s executive director, Chiyomaru Shikura, felt that visual novels are above manga but below anime as a media genre, and said that, with the move to 3D, the genre would gradually catch up to anime. He said that while the Xbox 360 market was not strong in Japan, he felt that Japanese Xbox 360 users were people who liked video games a lot, and who had the ability to increase their community; he believed word-of-mouth to be an important aspect of the Japanese Xbox 360 market. The remake's theme song was performed by Kokomi of the band Asriel.

== Reception ==
Reception

Review scores
Publication	Score
Famitsu	7/10, 6/10, 7/10, 6/10 (PS2/DC); 7/10, 8/10, 7/10, 8/10 (X360)
RPGFan	93%

Neal Chandran at RPGFan called Ever 17 "a fantastic adventure game", and one of the best Japanese games in the genre that are available in English, describing it as a "must-play". He liked the game's writing, finding the conversations with other characters to be deep, philosophical, and intellectual, and said that each character was interesting. He found the conversations to reading "like conversation should", but also found the English localization to contain multiple flaws, including spelling mistakes and grammatical errors, such as the misuse of the words "your" and "you're". Jason Young at GameZone called the game an "all-age masterpiece [that] is nearly flawless in every regard", and said that it was the best visual novel that was available in English. He said that it was one of the video games with the best characterization in history, and called the game's plot twist "mind-blowing".

Writers for Famitsu thought that the combination of suspense and romance made for a strange feeling. They found the game system to be characteristic of KID, calling it user-friendly, and saying that it made repeated playthroughs pleasant. Chandran liked the game's graphics, saying that while they only consist on still 2D images on static backgrounds, the character designs were appealing and the backgrounds were bright and detailed. He called the game's sound "top notch", saying that the voice actors did an excellent job with their characters, and that the music was very good; he liked how it was varied, feeling that it represented the various scenarios and moods in the game well, and that it was a big improvement over the music in the previous game in the series.

In 2010, RPGFan ranked the game as the eighteenth best role-playing game of the 2000s, calling it "a pinnacle of visual novels", citing its story, which they called "one of the most emotionally charged, intense, deep, and compelling storylines ever seen in a video game", and the characters, which they said develop believably, ensuring that the player forms an emotional bond to at least one; they called the character of Tsugumi one of the best tragic heroines they had encountered in a game. Chandran ranked the game as the third best role-playing game from the sixth generation of video game consoles, saying that it was his favorite in the Infinity series, and one of his favorite video games overall.

== See also ==
- List of underwater science fiction works
