= List of Punch Line episodes =

Cover art for DVD volume 1, featuring the character Mikatan Narugino

Punch Line (Japanese: パンチライン, Hepburn: Panchi Rain) is an anime series produced at the animation studio MAPPA by Mages. It was directed by Yutaka Uemura and written by Kotaro Uchikoshi, and features music by Tetsuya Komuro and character designs by Shōta Iwasaki. It premiered on the Fuji Television programming block Noitamina on April 10, 2015, (Note: While an episode may be advertised as airing on a certain date at "24:50", this means that the episode aired at 50 minutes past midnight on the following date; this list uses the actual dates.) and was streamed by Crunchyroll in several other regions as it aired in Japan. In Australia, it is also streamed on AnimeLab. The series is being released for home media in Japan by Aniplex on DVD and Blu-ray in six volumes. Another home media release is planned by Sentai Filmworks, which has licensed the series for North America.

The story follows Yūta Iridatsu, whose soul gets separated from his body. As a spirit, he watches the daily lives of the inhabitants of an apartment.

The opening theme of the series, "PUNCH LINE!", was composed and written by Ken'ichi Maeyamada, and performed by Shoko Nakagawa and Dempagumi.inc under the name Shokotan Dempagumi.inc.

== Episode list ==
No.	Title	Original release date
1	"Panty Panic"; Transliteration: "Pantsu Panikku" (Japanese: パンツパニック)	April 10, 2015
On December 21, Yūta Iridatsu is caught up in a bus hijacking along with his neighbour Rabura Chichibu, at which point super heroine Strange Juice comes to save the day. Rabura is knocked out by the mastermind who is about to shoot Strange Juice, but hesitates when he sees a pink "G" on her neck. When Yūta sees Rabura's panties, he powers up and tackles the mastermind out into the sea. He wakes up on the shore with Strange Juice, and upon seeing her panties, falls unconscious again and powers down, at which point something falls from the sky, forcing his soul out of his body. He reawakens in his room at the Korai House apartment complex two days later, where a spirit cat, Chiranosuke, explains that another spirit is inhabiting his body and he must find the "Nandala Gandala" book to take back his body. While Yūta searches for the book in his apartment building, he learns that when he sees girls panties twice in a row, he loses consciousness and a meteor destroys earth. Luckily, he also learns that he can go back in time and re-do the situation in his spirit form, as well as manipulate objects to a small extent. Later, Yūta learns that his neighbour, Mikatan Narugino, is Strange Juice.
2	"The Lace of Compassion"; Transliteration: "Seirui Awaremi no Rēsu" (Japanese: 生類憐みのレース)	April 17, 2015
As Rabura despairs that she will never have real spirit powers like her parents, the apartment's landlady, Meika Daihatsu, learns "Cheermancy" to cheer her up, which Rabura mishears as "necromancy". Meanwhile, Yūta learns that cinnamon dust in the air raises his spirit powers, using the opportunity to break a bottle in front of Rabura, though he cannot do it again without the cinnamon boost. Later, Ito Hikiotani tries and fails to hide a bear cub named Muhi she found abandoned in a box.
3	"Mars Attacks!"; Transliteration: "Kaseijin, Shūrai!" (Japanese: 火星人、襲来！)	April 24, 2015
The "Qmay group" broadcasts a video challenging the government to explain an imminent asteroid due to arrive on New Year's Eve, leading Yūta to suspect that the group's recently deceased leader, Qmay Tsubouchi, is the spirit inhabiting his body. Later, as Mikatan plans a Christmas party in Ito's room, she uses Meika's camouflage technology to try to keep her identity as Strange Juice a secret from Ito. Later that night, an intruder from the Qmay group known as "Turtle Man" attempts to kidnap Muhi, who gets cut in the struggle. However, he is rescued by a costumed hero calling himself Kenji Miyazawa, who appears to have the same powers as Yūta, and is revealed to have regenerative healing. Afterwards, Ito and Rabura learn that Mikatan is Strange Juice while Meika is revealed to be a robot.
4	"Possessed by the Stripes"; Transliteration: "Toritsuku Shima Moyō" (Japanese: 取り憑くシマ模様)	May 1, 2015
In a flashback, a boy named Pine asks a girl named Guriko to run away from a laboratory with him, while another girl, Chiyoko, sings a song. In present time, as Rabura prepares for a date with a man named Gliese, Yūta discovers that a girl included on a list of names posted by QMay has been found dead, with Ito's name also featured on that list. Yūta manages to use cinnamon power to possess Rabura's body, but fails to warn the others about the trouble Ito is in before its effects run out. After meeting with Rabura, Gliese reveals he is from the NSA, and is trying to contact Meika so she can hack the Qmay group's virus before it can disrupt a satellite meant to intercept the meteor. They are interrupted by Kenji, who is thwarted by Rabura, before all the girls end up getting into a fight. Later, Yūta recognizes a song that Mikatan sings as the one Chiyoko sang.
5	"Ito Dies"; Transliteration: "Ito, Shisu" (Japanese: 愛、死す)	May 8, 2015
On December 29, Yūta is shocked to find Ito dead at the shrine and uses his power to go back in time to earlier that day. After Yūta possesses Rabura and informs her about Ito's impending doom, Mikatan manages to stop her from going to the temple. Ito reveals to Mikatan that the other girls' names in the video were people who bullied her at school, further revealing that she originally posted the video herself as a prank, but someone else edited the video to include her name and sent out threatening e-mails. When Mikatan mentions she was raised with two other kids at Über Labs, Yūta has a flashback of Pine using a power called "Über-fy" to protect Chiyoko. The next day, the Turtle Man captures Muhi as punishment for not showing up at the shrine. Using his powers to manipulate Ito's phone, Yūta lures the intruder up to the rooftop and has Meika and Rabura lay out a trap for him, but he see through their scheme and shoots Meika.
6	"It's New Year's Eve, Meikaemon"; Transliteration: "Ōmisoka da yo, Meikaemon" (Japanese: 大晦日だよ、明香えもん)	May 15, 2015
As Kenji and Mikatan arrive on the scene, the Turtle Man reveals he possesses the same Über-fy powers they do and fights back. However, Kenji, who is able to perceive Yūta, creates an opportunity for him to possess Rabura and defeat the intruder, with Meika also surviving. Afterwards, the girls discover the intruder was Ito's homeroom teacher Chihaya Tomoda, who, out of a deranged love for Ito, allowed himself to be possessed by Qmay Tsubouchi's spirit in order to carry out revenge against the students who bullied Ito. The next day, the girls hold a New Year's Party, during which Meika reveals that Yūta is biologically female, later telling Ito about how she came to meet Mikatan. After Kenji helps out Mikatan, who needs to take medication to counter the side effects of her powers, the meteorite in orbit suddenly starts hurtling towards Earth. Revealing himself to be Yūta's future self, Kenji gives Yūta the Nandala-Gandala, which is blank except for the word "U-turn", and tells Yūta that in order to regain possession of his body and prevent Earth's destruction, he must go back in time to the point where it all began.
7	"Panty Panic Returns"; Transliteration: "Kaettekita, Pantsu Panikku" (Japanese: 帰ってきた、パンツパニック)	May 22, 2015
Yūta returns to his own body on December 21, right after the busjacking incident. After reviewing the upcoming important dates, Yūta is informed by Chiranosuke that he must change the future, which his previous selves failed to do, without revealing the truth to anyone or changing the future without his permission, further explaining how his nosebleeds results in mankind's destruction. After setting up talismans to keep his spirit double from reaching his body, Yūta decides against writing "U-Turn" into the Nandala-Gandala, feeling it would be admitting defeat, while also managing to prevent his spirit double from seeing the girls' panties. The next day, as Yūta tries to ask Rabura about Gliese, he spots Tomoda and pursues him, but is stopped by Chiranosuke, who tells him not to undo the events that helped the residents form bonds with each other. Chiranosuke further explains that the reason Yūta's soul so easily detached from his body is related to an event nine years ago. During this event, Pine, Chiyoko, and Guriko ended up switching bodies with each other during an escape attempt when a lightning strike hit their Über-fied states, with Yūta being the result of Pine's soul winding up in Chiyoko's body. Back in the present, Yūta receives a package from his foster sister, Akina Iridatsu, which turns out to be the Kenji Miyazawa costume.
8	"Panty Party!"	May 29, 2015
On December 24, the day Tomoda first attempted to kidnap Muhi, Yūta takes on the guise of Kenji in order to chase after him. Questioning the soul of Tsubouchi possessing Tomoda, Yūta learns that the Qmay group was the one responsible for creating both Muhi and Uber powers. Afterward Qmay leaves and Tomoda is hospitalized, Yūta speaks with Meika, who appears to be familiar with Kenji due to the words of her late grandfather, who told her to form a hero team known as Justice Punch after receiving a fax from the future. The next day, Yūta meets with Rabura's cousin Rando, the one who gave Muhi to Ito, who betrayed the Qmay group in order to put a stop to their W project. Later, on December 26, as Mikatan expresses her thanks to Yūta for his help during the bus-jacking, she collapses in front of him.
9	"Brazilian High Kick"; Transliteration: "Burajirian Hai Kikku" (Japanese: ブラジリアンハイキック)	June 5, 2015
After getting her medication, Yūta reveals his identity as Pine to Mikatan, who is revealed to be Chiyoko's soul inhabiting Guriko's body. Mikatan explains how, after she ended up switching bodies, she was looked after by Ishigata, the man who helped everyone escape from Über Labs, who was later killed by lab members searching for her. The next day, Yūta speaks with various scientists, who contradict Gliese's claims about being able to destroy the meteor with nuclear weapons, leading him to suspect Gliese is lying about his identity. Afterwards, Yūta speaks with Meika about Mikatan's worsening condition, asking her to do a physical check-up on her. The next day, December 27, Chiranosuke urges Yūta not to change the days events that would lead to the group fighting and making up with each other, but he decides against it and confronts Gliese Gliese reveals himself to be one of the leaders of the Qmay group who devised a scheme to trick Meika into hacking into a satellite in order to change the meteor's trajectory towards Earth. Hitting Yūta with an anesthetic, Gliese attacks using Über-fy powers, revealing himself to be Guriko, the one now possessing Pine's body.
10	"The Fall"; Transliteration: "Tsuiraku" (Japanese: 墜落)	June 12, 2015
On the morning of December 28, Yūta finds he is too late to stop Meika hacking into the satellite just as Guriko planned, giving Qmay the ability to launch missiles at the meteor to steer it towards Earth. Deeming the mission to save mankind to be a failure, Chiranosuke has Yūta make preparations for his next self. The next day on December 29, the day where Ito was originally scheduled to die, Yūta and Mikatan receive a text calling them to the shrine, where they come face to face with Guriko, who had taken Ito hostage to lure them out. Returning Ito to them, Guriko states that the only way Yūta and Mikatan can survive the meteor crash is if they become Ws using Muhi's regeneration ability before taking her leave. Just as Yūta is at the brink of giving up altogether, he thinks of his friends and becomes determined to protect them, asking Meika for her help in saving humanity.
11	"Justice Punch!"; Transliteration: "Jasutisu Panchi!" (Japanese: ジャスティスパンチ!)	June 19, 2015
Learning about the change in the meteor's trajectory and everything Yūta has gone through, Meika concocts a plan to launch all the world's ballistic missiles at the meteor as it comes within range, tasking Yūta with protecting Korai House from anyone trying to stop her from doing so. On the day before New Year's Eve, Meika is reluctant to let the others, who had eavesdropped on her, help out with the operation, stating that Mikatan will die if she Über-fies one more time. However, the others remain determined to help, forming the Justice Punch team together. Come New Year's Eve, the operation begins, with Yūta and Mikatan protecting the Korai House from armed forces under the influence of the Qmay group. When Guriko arrives with a team of Ws, along with the U.S. Army whose leader is possessed by Tsubouchi, Ito takes up a mech to hold off the army while the Spirit Yūta possesses Rabura to assist Yūta and Mikatan.
12	"Punch Line"; Transliteration: "Panchi Rain" (Japanese: パンチライン)	June 26, 2015
With thirty minutes left on the clock, Guriko infiltrates the Korai House and heavily damages Meika, putting a stop to her hacking. As Yūta faces off against Guriko, Rabura manages to stop Tsubouchi and exorcise him, allowing Ito and Meika to finish the hacking and launch the missiles and destroy the meteor. Meanwhile, Mikatan decides to activate her power to stop Yūta and Guriko fighting. Before Mikatan is killed by the side effects, Yūta switches bodies with her, returning Mikatan back to Chiyoko's body while he passes away in hers. 49 days later, the Spirit Yūta bids farewell to the others before going back in time to accomplish what he needs to do for a bright future.

== Media release ==
The series is being released in six volumes on DVD and Blu-ray by Aniplex in Japan. Each volume includes a character song; the first volume also includes a clean version of the series' opening and ending, a collection of commercials and promotional videos for the series, and the storyboards of episode 1; volumes 2 through 6 include a booklet.

Volume	Episodes	Release date
Volume 1	1–2	July 22, 2015
Volume 2	3–4	August 26, 2015
Volume 3	5–6	September 30, 2015
Volume 4	7–8	October 28, 2015
Volume 5	9–10	November 25, 2015
Volume 6	11–12	December 23, 2015
