= Punch line (disambiguation) =

A punch line is the conclusion of a joke.

Punch line or punchline may also refer to:

== Film, television, video games and comics ==
- Punch Line, a Japanese anime television series produced by MAPPA.
  - Punch Line (video game), a video game based on the anime series.
- Punchline (company), a video game developer.
- Punchline (film), a 1988 American film written and directed by David Seltzer.
- Punchlines, a British comedy game show.
- Punchline (character), a DC Comics supervillain.
- "Punchline" (Snuff Box), a TV episode

== Music ==
- Punchline (band), an American pop punk band
- Punchline (rapper), longtime partner of rapper Wordsworth
- The Punch Line, an album by Minutemen, 1981
- "Punchline", an instrumental by The Beach Boys from Good Vibrations: Thirty Years of The Beach Boys

== Other uses ==
- Punch Line San Francisco, a comedy club in San Francisco
- The Punchline, a comedy club in Atlanta, Georgia, US
- Punch line (ice hockey), a line for the 1940s Montreal Canadiens
