= Pepsiman =

Pepsiman may refer to:

- Pepsiman (character), a mascot character for Pepsi
  - Pepsiman (video game), a 1999 PlayStation video game featuring the character
