= Too Kyo Games =

Japanese game developer

Too Kyo Games, Inc.
- Native name: トゥーキョーゲームス株式会社
- Romanized name: Tū Kyō Gēmusu Kabushiki-gaisha
- Type: Kabushiki-gaisha
- Industry: Video games, anime
- Founded: 2017; 9 years ago
- Headquarters: Tokyo, Japan
- Key people: Kazutaka Kodaka (CEO); Kotaro Uchikoshi; Masafumi Takada; Rui Komatsuzaki
- Number of employees: 10 (2023)
- Website: tookyogames.jp

Too Kyo Games, Inc. (Japanese: トゥーキョーゲームス株式会社, Hepburn: Tū Kyō Gēmusu Kabushiki-gaisha) is a Japanese video game developer founded by ex-employees of Spike Chunsoft. It was formed in 2017 by Danganronpa series creator Kazutaka Kodaka, Zero Escape series creator Kotaro Uchikoshi, composer Masafumi Takada, and artist Rui Komatsuzaki. The company is working on several games, and collaborated with Pierrot on the 2020 anime series Akudama Drive.

== History ==
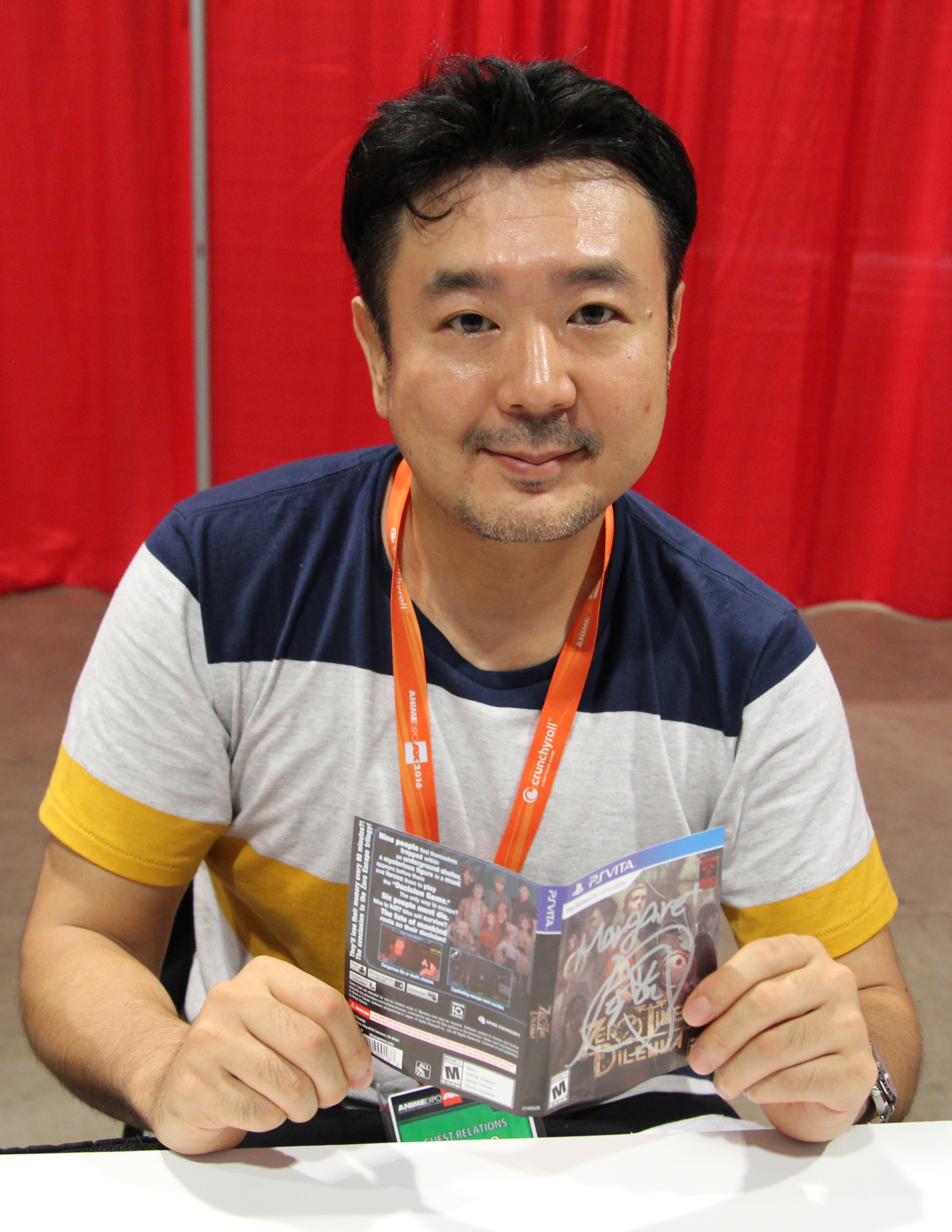
Kotaro Uchikoshi (pictured), Kazutaka Kodaka, Masafumi Takada, and Rui Komatsuzaki are the core members of the company.

Kazutaka Kodaka, the writer of Spike Chunsoft's Danganronpa franchise, started thinking about how he wanted to create his own development company where he could do new things, following the completion of the anime television series Danganronpa 3 (2016) and the video game Danganronpa V3 (2017). He discussed it with the Danganronpa composer and character designer, Masafumi Takada and Rui Komatsuzaki, who also were interested in the idea. Takada founded the company in 2017, as he had already been involved in the launch of other companies. Kodaka also invited other people to join the company, including Kotaro Uchikoshi, the director and scenario writer for Spike Chunsoft's Zero Escape series, the Danganronpa illustrator Shimadoriru, Takumi Nakazawa, the director and co-writer of KID's Infinity series, and the Danganronpa novelist Yoichirou Koizumi. Kodaka, Takada, Komatsuzaki, and Uchikoshi are the core members of the company, and Kodaka is its representative and CEO. The company's name is a wordplay on Tokyo – where they are based – and the Japanese word kyō (狂; "crazy"), thus meaning "Too Crazy Games". The goal of the company, according to Kodaka, is to create new intellectual properties, and for the staff to also create their own indie game projects; though he has stated he would like to return to the Danganronpa franchise.

The company was announced to the public in September 2018, announcing that four projects were under development, which were eventually revealed as the games World's End Club, Master Detective Archives: Rain Code, and The Hundred Line: Last Defense Academy, and the anime series Akudama Drive. Development of Rain Code began prior to Kodaka's departure from Spike Chunsoft. In addition to these four projects which were released from 2020 through to 2025, the company announced and released the FMV game Death Come True in 2020, and announced the "Extreme Baseball" multimedia project Tribe Nine.

Between 2020 and 2023, Too Kyo Games recruited new employees, including Jun Fukuda, the sound designer and composer known for working in the No More Heroes series, UI and graphic designer Yuki Kudo, and novelist Kyohei Oyama.

In May 2025, Too Kyo Games was announced to be developing Shuten Order in collaboration with DMM Games. It was released in September 2025. Later that year, it was announced Too Kyo Games would participate in the development of Danganronpa 2×2, a remake and retelling of 2012's Danganronpa 2: Goodbye Despair, which is set to release in 2027.

== Works ==
=== Video games ===
Year	Title	Publisher	Platform(s)	Notes	Ref.
2020	Death Come True	IzanagiGames	Android, iOS, macOS, Nintendo Switch, PlayStation 4, PlayStation 5, Windows, Xbox One	Co-developed with Esquadra	
2020	World's End Club	JP: IzanagiGames; WW: NIS America	iOS, macOS, Nintendo Switch, Windows, PlayStation 5, Xbox One, Xbox Series X/S	Co-developed with Grounding	
2023	Master Detective Archives: Rain Code	WW: Spike Chunsoft; AU: Nintendo (Switch)	Nintendo Switch, PlayStation 5, Windows, Xbox Series X/S	Co-developed with Spike Chunsoft	
2025	Tribe Nine	Akatsuki	Android, iOS, macOS, Windows	Co-developed with Akatsuki	
2025	The Hundred Line: Last Defense Academy	WW: Aniplex; NA: Xseed Games (Switch)	Nintendo Switch, Windows	Co-developed with Media.Vision	
2025	Shuten Order	JP: DMM Games; WW: Spike Chunsoft	Nintendo Switch, Nintendo Switch 2, Windows	Co-developed with Neilo	
2027	Danganronpa 2×2	Spike Chunsoft	Nintendo Switch, Nintendo Switch 2, PlayStation 5, Windows, Xbox Series X/S	Co-developed with Gemdrops	

=== Anime ===
Year	Title	Notes	Ref.
2020	Akudama Drive	Co-produced with Pierrot	
2022	Tribe Nine	Co-produced with Liden Films and Akatsuki	
