= The Girl in Twilight =

Japanese multimedia franchise

- Promotional art for the series

あかねさす少女 (Akanesasu Shōjo)
- Genre: Action
- Created by: Metal Layer; Kotaro Uchikoshi
- Anime television series
- Directed by: Jin Tamamura; Yūichi Abe
- Written by: Shogo Yasukawa
- Music by: Kohta Yamamoto; Shun Narita
- Studio: Dandelion Animation Studio; Jūmonji (1–7); Okuruto Noboru (8–12)
- Licensed by: Sentai Filmworks
- Original network: Animax, Tokyo MX, YTV
- Original run: October 1, 2018 – December 17, 2018
- Episodes: 12
- Video game
- Music by: Ryu
- Platform: iOS, Android
- Released: October 15, 2018

The Girl in Twilight (Japanese: あかねさす少女, Hepburn: Akanesasu Shōjo; lit. 'Girl Glowing Red') is a Japanese multimedia franchise created to celebrate the 20th anniversary of Animax. An anime television series aired from October 1 to December 17, 2018. The project also included a free-to-play mobile game that was launched on October 15, 2018, and shut down on January 31, 2019.

== Plot ==
The series follows five girls who discover a way to travel to parallel universes using a radio. As they visit several universes, they discover that a cosmic force known only as the "Twilight" is invading and destroying the universes. One by one, they start to transform into magical girls called "Equalizers", and find themselves drawn into the war against the Twilight.

== Characters ==
Asuka Tsuchimiya (土宮明日架, Tsuchimiya Asuka)
Voiced by: Tomoyo Kurosawa
Yū Tōnaka (灯中優, Tōnaka Yū)
Voiced by: Lynn
Mia Silverstone (みあ・シルバーストーン, Mia Shirubāsutōn)
Voiced by: Nao Tōyama
Nana Nanase (七瀬奈々, Nanase Nana)
Voiced by: Ami Koshimizu
Chloé Morisu (森須クロエ, Morisu Kuroe)
Voiced by: Marina Inoue

== Media ==
=== Anime ===
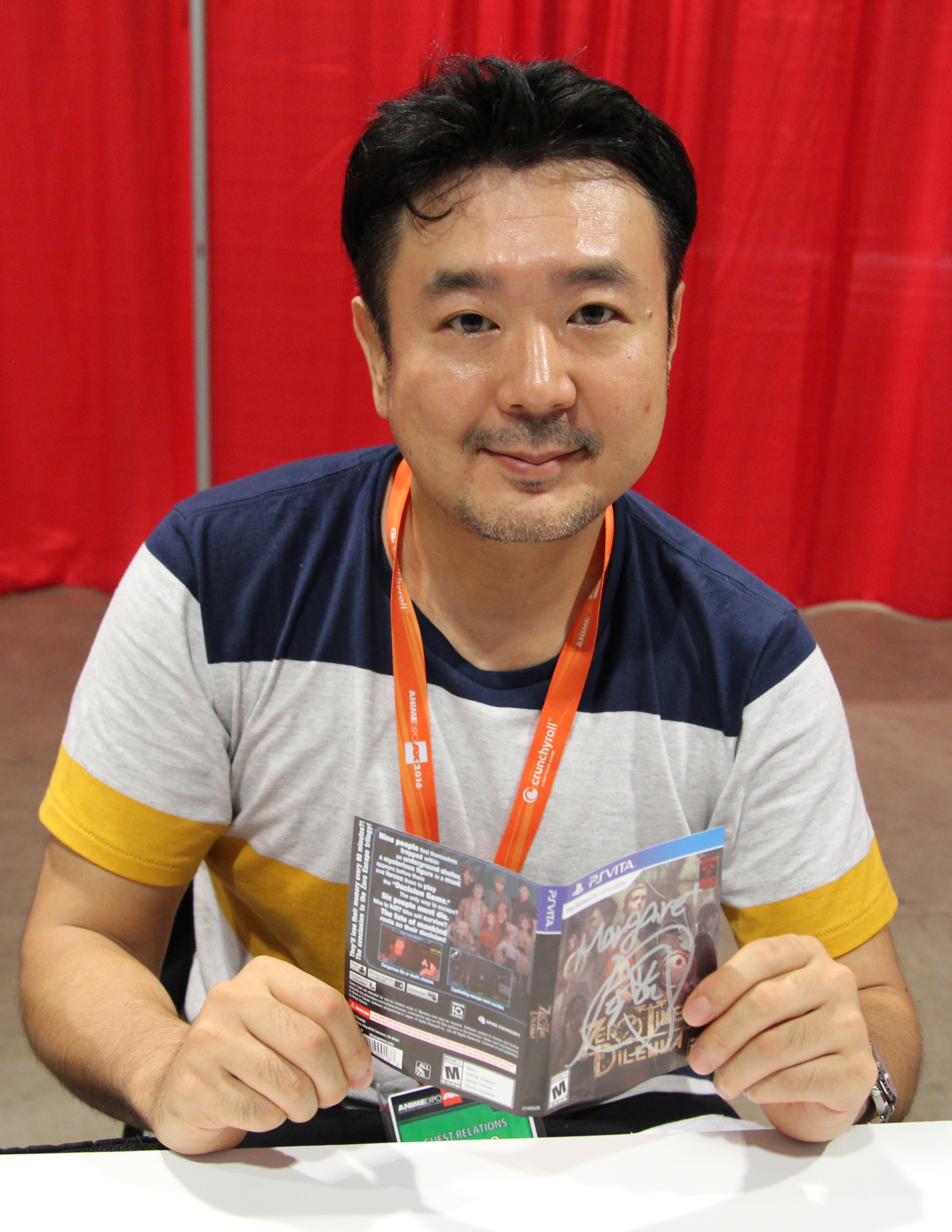
Kotaro Uchikoshi wrote the series' original concept.

Animax announced the project on March 22, 2018, as a celebration of the channel's 20th anniversary. The anime television series was directed by Jin Tamamura and Yūichi Abe and written by Shogo Yasukawa, based on a concept by Kotaro Uchikoshi. Hiroshi Yamamoto was credited for writing the series' "SF setting". The series was animated by Dandelion Animation Studio and Jūmonji. Character designs were provided by Masakazu Katsura and Hiroyuki Asada, who also served as the series' concept artist. Hiroki Harada adapted the character designs for animation. Akitomo Yamamoto, Koji Watanabe, and Yuki Kawashima served as sub-character designers, with Yamamoto also having served as chief animation director. Susumu Imaishi, Koji Watanabe, and Sayaka Takase provided prop designs for the series, and Ryō Hirata and Yasuhiro Moriki also provided designs. Yusa Itō served as art director at Kusanagi, while Haruko Nobori was the color key artist, Stanislas Brunet produced the imageboard art, and Akihiro Hirasawa was in charge of art setting. Atsushi Satou served as the director of photography at Studio Shamrock. Hideaki Takeda produced the series' 3DCG, and Hiroto Morishita served as sound director. The series was edited by Mai Hasegawa.

Ryu produced the series' music, and Kenji Itō composed the main theme song. The opening theme song, "Soranetarium" (ソラネタリウム), was performed by Michi, and the ending theme song was a cover of Hideaki Tokunaga's song "Kowarekake no Radio" (壊れかけのRadio; lit. 'Broken Radio'), performed by Ami Wajima.

The series ran from October 1 to December 17, 2018, for 12 episodes and was broadcast on Animax, Tokyo MX, and YTV. It is also available on multiple streaming services. Sentai Filmworks has licensed the series and is streaming it on Hidive. MVM Entertainment has acquired the series for distribution via Sentai Filmworks in the UK and Ireland.

==== Episode list ====
No.	Title (Note: All English episode titles are taken from Hidive.)	Original release date
1	"The Ritual at 4:44" "4 Ji 44 Pun no Gishiki" (4時44分の儀式 〜Ritual at 4:44〜)	October 1, 2018
2	"Another Fragment" "Furaggu Komento" (違う世界(フラッグコメント) 〜Another FRAGMENT〜)	October 8, 2018
3	"Before the Wedding Bells Ring" "Wēdingu beru ga naru mae ni" (ウェーディング・ベルが鳴る前に 〜The bride can't help it〜)	October 15, 2018
4	"The Magnificent Five. Or Eleven" "Kōya no go-ri, tomoni wa jū ichi-ri" (荒野の五人、もしくは十一人 〜The magnificent five. or eleven〜)	October 22, 2018
5	"The Hero in Me" "Hīrō no jōken" (ヒーローの条件 〜The hero in me〜)	October 29, 2018
6	"Alone on an Island" "Hitori no Airando" (ひとりのアイランド 〜Alone in the island〜)	November 5, 2018
7	"Tu n'es pas seule."	November 12, 2018
8	"Asuka and Asuka" "Asuka to Asuka" (明日架とアスカ 〜Asuka and ASUKA〜)	November 19, 2018
9	"Facing Twilight" "Sokoniaru tasogare" (そこに在る黄昏 〜Facing TWILIGHT〜)	November 26, 2018
10	"Liars Party" "Uso-tsuki no utage" (うそつきの宴 〜Liars' party〜)	December 3, 2018
11	"You, the Honor Student" "Yūtōsei" (優等生 〜You〜)	December 10, 2018
12	"After the Twilight Falls" "Itsuka, tasogare no furu sora no" (いつか、黄昏の降る空の 〜After the twilight falls〜)	December 17, 2018

=== Game ===
The project also included a free-to-play mobile game tie-in. The game shared the same writer, character designer, concept artist, composer, and main theme songwriter as the anime. The game was released on iOS and Android. The game's service closed on January 31, 2019, although an offline version retaining some features was then made available.

== Reception ==
=== Previews ===
The anime series' first episode garnered mixed reviews from Anime News Network's staff during the Fall 2018 season previews. Nick Creamer was impressed by the script's "grace of dialogue and characterization" during the introduction of Asuka and her friends, and the Land of the Lustrous-esque fight choreography but felt the story was "mostly just functional", saying it "demonstrates promise in a variety of ways." James Beckett praised the Radio Research society concept and its slice-of-life aura in the first half but was put off by the second half when the cast shrugged off their supernatural encounter and downplayed its overall mystery, saying that it's worth checking out a few more episodes to see more potential in the premise and tell a captivating story. Theron Martin gave praise to the "mostly solid" technical merits and was intrigued by the multiple dimensions concept and meeting alternate versions of Asuka but was critical of her ensemble being made up of "standard girl-group personality archetypes", concluding with: "Basically, this isn't a knock-your-socks-off kind of debut, but it's just good and intriguing enough to merit a mild recommendation." Paul Jensen commended the conversation between both Asukas towards the end but was conflicted over the ensemble cast and its supposed camaraderie with each other and the alternate world visuals having a vibrant color palette but a poor CG action scene, concluding that: "As it stands, this episode is just intriguing enough to merit sticking around for a week or two, if only to find out what the heck is going on." Rebecca Silverman criticized the tryhard attempts at being "interesting and quirky" with its ideas feeling unnatural and the female cast having sparse characterizations but gave praise to "the contrasts between the two Asukas" and the missing little brother mystery. She concluded that: "I'm not quite intrigued enough to say that I'll definitely be giving this a second episode, but it does seem like it will be worth catching up with further down the line. If it can get past its too-obvious attempts to stand out, the story itself may make this worthwhile all on its own."

=== Series ===
Martin reviewed the complete anime series in 2019 and gave it an overall B grade. He felt the story had a "fairly standard plot construction" and was "heavy-handed" with its subject matter throughout the various world designs but gave it praise for allowing the cast to have "decent character growth" as the series progressed, solid artistic efforts in the other worlds and its use of CG and Tomoyo Kurosawa's performance as the different versions of Asuka. He concluded that "the season's late episodes bring together the balance of serious and goofy story elements well enough for the story to be effective as a tale of personal growth." Allen Moody, writing for THEM Anime Reviews, was positive towards the story of each girl confronting their personal issues in an alternate world but felt it was undercut by "ludicrous showdowns" with "CG-animated magical/mecha girl transformations" and action sequences.
