= The Hundred Line: Last Defense Academy =

2025 video game

- English Nintendo Switch cover art
- Developers: Too Kyo Games; Media.Vision
- Publisher: Aniplex (Note: Nintendo Switch version published by Xseed Games in North America)
- Directors: Kazutaka Kodaka; Kotaro Uchikoshi
- Producer: Shuntaro Inou
- Designers: Akihiro Togawa; Tomonori Sakai
- Programmer: Kenichi Tajima
- Artists: Rui Komatsuzaki; Shimadoriru
- Writers: Kazutaka Kodaka; Kotaro Uchikoshi; Kyohei Oyama
- Composer: Masafumi Takada
- Platforms: Nintendo Switch; Windows
- Release: April 24, 2025
- Genres: Visual novel, tactical role-playing
- Mode: Single-player

The Hundred Line: Last Defense Academy (Note: Japanese: HUNDRED LINE -最終防衛学園-, Hepburn: Handoreddo Rain: Saishū Bōei Gakuen) is a visual novel and tactical role-playing video game developed by Too Kyo Games and Media.Vision and published by Aniplex. It was one of the first games announced by Too Kyo Games in 2018 and was released on April 24, 2025 for the Nintendo Switch and Windows.

The player controls a high school student named Takumi Sumino, who lives in the underground Tokyo Residential Complex. When the complex is attacked by invaders, Sumino fights back and finds himself at the Last Defense Academy, a school in a destroyed city continuously under attack by invaders and their leader, V'ehxness. After defending the school for 100 days, the player can re-do previous events in the game, altering the course of the narrative.

The game was a collaboration between directors Kazutaka Kodaka and Kotaro Uchikoshi. Kodaka's initial pitch of the game included 100 potential narrative routes for the player to traverse. By September 2023, the writing team was not complete, leading Uchikoshi and Kodaka to hire more writing staff. Too Kyo Games went into debt while developing the game, leading the studio to take out a loan to fund development.

The Hundred Line: Last Defense Academy was the highest selling new release in Japan for the Nintendo Switch from April 21 to May 4, 2025. It garnered "generally favorable reviews", according to review aggregator site Metacritic.

== Gameplay ==
The Hundred Line takes place over 100 in-game days and alternates between visual novel story progression and tactical role playing game combat gameplay. During combat, the player character Takumi Sumino, along with 14 other students in Last Defense Academy, must face off against waves of enemies known as School Invaders while protecting a defense target, such as a barrier generator or an injured person. During their turn, the player can use a limited amount of Ability Points (AP) to move the students around a grid and utilise their unique abilities, after which the enemy takes their turn. Successful attacks build up a Voltage meter which, once full, can be spent to either give a student an additional move or let them perform a special technique. Additionally, students can perform a sacrificial "Last Defense" technique when they are low on health. While within the school, any students who are killed in battle can be revived in between waves. Clearing battles earns Battle Points (BP) depending on how the player performs. When not engaged in battles, the player can enjoy Free Time, during which they can spend time with other students to increase their skills, take part in training battles to earn more BP, or explore outside of the school to obtain materials. By raising skills and gaining materials, players can enhance the students' weapons to make them more powerful in battle. After completing the game's first ending, the game's in-game title changes to The Hundred Line: Last Defense Academy 2, described by developers as the game's "sequel within the game itself". The player is then enabled to make decisions which branch the story, with the game containing a total of 101 endings, (Note: This includes the original ending of The Hundred Line. The Hundred Line 2 is listed in promotional material as having 100 endings.) distributed across 21 distinct 'routes'.

== Synopsis ==
=== Setting and characters ===
The player takes control of Takumi Sumino, a typical high school boy living in the Tokyo Residential Complex (TRC), an underground domed structure, alongside his parents and childhood friend Karua Kashimiya. After the TRC is attacked by invading monsters, Takumi is granted the power of "Hemoanima" to fight back by a "mysterious school mascot" named Sirei, who then forcibly enlists him in the Special Defense Unit (SDU) to protect Last Defense Academy, a school surrounded by a wall of Undying Flames located in the middle of city ruins on the surface. The SDU members include: Hiruko Shizuhara, a cold, calculating, and ruthless girl who seems to know more than she's letting on; Takemaru Yakushiji, an old-school delinquent with an honor code; Darumi Amemiya, a manic emo girl who loves killing game stories; Eito Aotsuki, a kind, reliable young man who gets overwhelmed easily due to an unidentified medical condition; Tsubasa Kawana, a lively, inspiring mechanic with a weak stomach; Gaku Maruko, a selfish, cowardly, but hardworking orphan with a variety of skill sets; Shouma Ginzaki, a young man who's constantly putting himself down; Ima Tsukumo, the cunning older twin brother of Kako who harbors an extreme sister complex; and Kako Tsukumo, Ima's younger twin sister who desires to become a detective one day.

They are joined shortly after by the members of the Second-to-Last Defense Academy, led by Nigou, Sirei's second-in-command, consisting of Nozomi Kirifuji, a determined young lady who bears a striking resemblance to Takumi's childhood friend Karua; Kyoshika Magadori, a clueless young samurai with a disturbingly close relationship with her katana; Yugamu Omokage, a teenage assassin with a warped view on love; Kurara Oosuzuki, an extremely wealthy, proud, and overbearing young lady who wears a tomato mask; and Moko Mojiro, a friendly and energetic pro-wrestler.

Together, they fight to protect the school from the Invaders, led by Enemy Commanders who resemble humans and also possess Hemoanima. They, in turn, are commanded by the Supreme Commander, V'ehxness, a tyrannical dictator who wishes to do away with their religion's scriptures and taboos and become God herself; also among the commanders is Eva, whom the SDU can take prisoner and make an ally.

=== Plot ===
Takumi Sumino and his childhood friend Karua Kashimiya are caught up in an apparent alien invasion, whereupon Takumi is rescued by a robot named Sirei. However, Takumi finds himself separated from Karua and taken to the Last Defense Academy, where he is conscripted into the school's Special Defense Unit due to him being compatible with cryptoglobin, special blood that unlocks a power called "Hemoanima" that grants him special abilities to fight the aliens, dubbed "Invaders". Sirei explains that the Last Defense Academy contains a weapon critical to humanity's survival in the war, and Takumi and his fellow students must defend the school for one hundred days. While reluctant at first, Takumi is forced to fight off waves of Invaders with his fellow classmates. They are eventually joined by surviving students from the Second-to-Last Defense Academy, who are led by Nozomi Kirifuji, who looks identical to Karua, much to Takumi's confusion.

After several battles, the students learn that the Invader Commanders resemble humans, and have Hemoanima. In addition, the students' efforts to defend the school are met with major setbacks, such as Sirei being mysteriously murdered, leading Takumi to suspect that there is a traitor within the SDU. Eventually, after many victories and some losses among the SDU, including Nozomi, they manage to defeat Supreme Commander V'ehxness of the Invaders. However, they learn humanity has already evacuated to a massive space station called the Artificial Satellite, and come to believe they have been left behind as sacrificial pawns. Determined to find answers, the students break into the school's fortified Defense Room, where they discover a young infant named Shion is being used to fill numerous missiles with highly volatile Undying Flames, which humanity plans to bombard the entire planet with to exterminate the Invaders once and for all. SDU member Eito Aotsuki kills Shion and absorbs his cryptoglobin, revealing himself as the traitor. He views humanity as monsters due to a cognitive disorder, and wishes to eradicate the human race. Takumi and the other students battle and kill him.

With the missiles disabled and no help coming from the Artificial Satellite, the students prepare to meet their end at the hands of the Invaders. However, when the 100th day arrives, an escape pod activates, ready to evacuate the students to the Artificial Satellite. Realizing they had a method of escape all along and regretting the mistakes he made that caused the loss of Nozomi and many other students, Takumi wishes he could change the past. Shion's spirit contacts Takumi, informing him that having absorbed his and the Commanders' cryptoglobin, Takumi's Hemoanima power has evolved to allow him to travel back in time to Day 1. Determined to save everyone, Takumi uses his power to return to the past.

==== The Hundred Line 2: Last Defense Academy ====
From this point, Takumi can make various choices that can alter the timeline in significant ways, such as choosing whether or not to kill Eito right away, carrying out the mission they were assigned, rebelling against humanity and joining forces with the Invaders, deserting the war, and more.

In the "Last Defense Academy 2nd Scenario", which exposes the full truth of the war, the students learn they are not actually on Earth, but a human-habitable alien planet called Futurum. The humans in the Artificial Satellite fled Earth's destruction and started the Exodus Project to colonize Futurum. However, upon arriving, they were shocked to discover the planet was already inhabited by an intelligent species called the Futurans. Unable to communicate past the language barrier, Project Exodus waged war against the Futurans and created Takumi and the SDU by cloning them from Shion's cells and implanting false memories, and tasked them with defending Shion until the Undying Flame missiles were ready. Nozomi is the only true human among the group, having secretly joined them so she could fight by their side. However, when the students confront V'ehxness this time, she destroys the Artificial Satellite with her own Undying Flames missile, wiping out humanity. V'ehxness's victory is short lived, as she is quickly killed by the SDU.

With humanity gone, the students feel there is no more reason to exterminate the Futurans, who were defending themselves against the invading humans. However, Sirei's programming glitches and he decides to continue the plan, forcing Nozomi to destroy him. The students head to the Defense Room to disable the missiles, but Shion is forced to fight them. All of the students sacrifice themselves to transfer their power to Takumi, who destroys the missiles at the cost of his life, leaving Nozomi the only survivor of the SDU. Now alone, Nozomi wanders the ruins of Futurum until she comes across a trio of Futuran children and befriends them.

In the "S.F. Route", Takumi discovers that not only does fellow SDU member Hiruko Shizuhara retain memories from previous timelines, but also that everyone is trapped in a time loop, forced to repeatedly defend the school for 100 days over and over. He also learns of the existence of the G'ie, parasitic organisms capable of taking over both living and dead bodies, who are responsible for committing several murders in other routes. Making use of a time leap machine in an abandoned research lab, Takumi and Hiruko leap into other timelines to stop the G'ie from committing their murders and create an ending where everyone can survive to Day 100, breaking the time loop. Eventually, the students kill V'ehxness, but discover that the missiles have fully charged and the escape pod has been destroyed by a particle bacteria infection. They use the time leap machine to flee to a timeline where the pod is intact and the SDU was wiped out defeating V'ehxness. Shion uses astral projection to safely activate the school's self-destruct mechanism and destroy the missiles, and the triumphant SDU escapes to the Artificial Satellite.

== Development ==
In 2017, developers Kazutaka Kodaka and Kotaro Uchikoshi formed a new video game studio called Too Kyo Games. They announced four projects in 2018, with one being The Hundred Line: Last Defense Academy.

=== Characters and narrative ===
The game's scenario was written and directed by Kodaka and Uchikoshi, with character designs by Rui Komatsuzaki and Shimadoriru, and music composed by Masafumi Takada.

Kodaka described one of the original concepts for the game as being a visual novel that can continue as long as the player wants, and as "a visual novel that never ends." Uchikoshi's initial response to the 100 narratives pitch was to "rethink this one" and created a flowchart with 100 routes to present how "rash [Kodaka's] idea was, but that only got him more motivated."

Uchikoshi added every route taken in the game should "feel like it could have been the true route" and there was "no true ending that can only be seen by completing the game". The multiple routes led to the team taking the narrative into different genres. Due to the large-scale narrative, the script was split between the team members. Kodaka wrote the first route in the game, with Uchikoshi working on the branching system and general ideas of what happens in the branch stories. This was followed by distributing responsibility for writing the routes. By September 2023, the writing team remained incomplete, leading Too Kyo to expand the writing team to include Kyouhei Oyama and Youichirou Koizumi.

Kodaka created the characters of The Hundred Line. He said the characters were intended to be down-to-earth, but gave them quirks whenever he found them too generic. Characters introduced later in the story, specifically Kurara Oosuzuki, Kyoshika Magadori, Yugamu Omokage, and Moko Mojiro, were designed to be more eccentric than Nozomi Kirifuji and the initial group of characters. As production progressed, Kodaka said all the characters' personalities became more extreme. Kodaka said that the major factor of defining the story was his own age, as he felt this was the last time he could write "believable teenager dialogue".

A cutscene in The Hundred Line: Last Defense Academy featuring various members of the defense team. Designer Rui Komatsuzaki focused on giving the characters different shaped bodies and heads to make them more identifiable during battle scenes.

Rui Komatsuzaki received Kodaka's script and a document listing the characteristics and nicknames of each character, such as "punk rock" for Darumi Amemiya. Komatsuzaki said his workflow was the same as previous games he had worked on, starting with a draft of the whole cast and then fine-tuning them for balance. As each character wears a uniform when they go into battle, Komatsuzaki designed the characters to be easier to identify by giving them diverse and distinct body types and heads. Unlike Kodaka and Komatsuzaki's earlier series Danganronpa which had fixed portraits when met during exploration periods, the characters in The Hundred Line sprites can be placed with expressions that fit the situation leading to The Hundred Line requiring more illustrations than in their previous games. Komatsuzaki highlighted Shouma Ginzaki's robot as being "hell for Media.Vision", as it had to transform, which required a lot more work to animate than other characters. Kodaka instructed the minor enemy invaders in the game be designed colorful and toy-like, to contrast with the seriousness of the narrative. In comparison, the Commanders were designed to be what Kodaka described as "monochrome and divine". This led a designer to visit Nakano Broadway to study vinyl kaiju figures for the game.

=== Gameplay ===
Kodaka opted to make the game a tactical role-playing game (TRPG), a style neither Uchikoshi or Kodaka previously worked on before, and which Kodaka felt would be the cheapest to develop. He found that during development, having the TRPG match the plot was much harder than the team had imagined, as difficulty had to be fine tuned to make each battle beatable depending on the amount of characters available in the story. Akihiro Togawa worked under various roles in the game including gameplay director, writer, schedule manager, and various other miscellaneous roles. Togawa described that the decision to let the writers create their own scenes was stressful as the schedule was tight and some writers, such as Nonon Ishii and Kyouhei Oyama had never done this before. Some scenes were designed to save time during development, such as the first-person perspective of a Commander when having their hemoanima taken by one of the defense unit members.

Togawa said that as the schedule manager, there was internal conflict during development on what would be "guaranteed to improve the game" versus against adding more hours to work. Too Kyo Games went into debt while developing the game, with the studio taking out a loan to fund development.

The design process involved Togawa coming up with game mechanics, and balancing the game around them. He purposely focused on giving the player a "cathartic moment" when battling opponents, such as setting up a special attack that would eliminate a horde of enemies. Unlike in most other TRPGs, Togawa designed party members to be used as disposable tools, which Togawa felt made the game more immersive. Togawa tweaked the gameplay until the last day of his contract.

== Release ==
Kodaka commented that he was happy on how the demo version of the game was received, saying that it was "the right marketing strategy, both for sales and for my mental health." On hearing early reception to the demo being that were too many sex jokes, Kodaka said his initial reaction to this was "Where?!", saying he thought he had toned them down.

The Hundred Line was announced during a Nintendo Direct presentation on June 18, 2024, and was released for the Nintendo Switch and Windows on April 24, 2025. The game's Japanese and English releases were scheduled for a simultaneous same day release. The game's physical release was distributed in North America by Xseed Games.

In Japan, a novel depicting a prequel to the character Hiruko Shizuhara was included for people who pre-ordered the game. Further novels were announced on August 2, 2025 which would expand on the background of characters, with the first being Darumi. Kodaka has said he has planned to keep expanding the game for "about ten years." While he said that the team was working on ideas daily for new routes, the development of them was "not fully in motion yet."

== Reception ==
Reception

Aggregate scores
Aggregator	Score
Metacritic	85/100 (NS); 83/100 (PC)
OpenCritic	79% recommend

Review scores
Publication	Score
Eurogamer	4/5
Famitsu	9/10, 9/10, 8/10, 9/10
Nintendo Life	9/10
Nintendo World Report	9.5/10
RPGFan	90/100
Shacknews	7/10

The Hundred Line: Last Defense Academy garnered "generally favorable reviews", according to review aggregator site Metacritic. Both reviews in Eurogamer and Nintendo Life complimented the narrative for its frequent plot twists and compelling nature, with the Eurogamer reviewer wishing that some passages later in the game were a bit shorter. Nintendo Life and The Verge complimented the characters and their over-the-top nature, while a Nintendo World Report reviewer wrote: "If you don't vibe with Kodaka's style of writing these highly exaggerated characters, I'm not sure The Hundred Line will change your mind," while concluding that "if you have enjoyed the large casts of a Danganronpa game, then know that The Hundred Line has possibly my favorite group of characters, which is saying a lot." Nintendo Life found the voice acting work strong, while noting there was not enough of it throughout the game.

The tactical RPG gameplay was also praised by Eurogamer, Nintendo Life and The Verge. Nintendo Life found it satisfying without being drawn-out while Eurogamer said fans of the genre will find it "minimalist", while still finding it appropriately challenging. The Verge complimented that the battles were not like Fire Emblem or Triangle Strategy and had unique gameplay that "fills the gaping hole Fire Emblem Engage created and the Advance Wars remakes could not fix." For the other gameplay elements, Nintendo Life complimented the risk vs. reward standards of the boardgame, while Eurogamer found that it "exploring the outside world on the game board demanded a lot of patience from me every time. The events are too random, the paths wear out quickly." Nintendo World Report found the persuasion minigames to be underdeveloped.

Shacknews found the focus on social and mini-games weakened the pacing. The reviewer wrote that allowing players entire in-game days to do this to "win a couple lines of sexual tensiony dialogue, just made me resent the Persona series for its crimes against the concept of portraying romance in video games."

Rolling Stone included The Hundred Line: Last Defense Academy on their year-end best of list. The game was listed at seventh, with Christ Cruz writing that the games scope was "quite an investment, but The Hundred Line packs in an entire series worth of anime lore and excitement into a single package worth wringing dry." Gene Park of The Washington Post included the list in his honorable mentions for the years finest titles, concluding that it "seems to be among the best in the visual novel genre, but its daunting run time scared me away." Kotaku ranked the game fourth on its 2025 best games list, praising the game for its ambition and variety of genres throughout the routes.

=== Sales ===
The Hundred Line: Last Defense Academy was the highest selling new release in Japan from April 21 to May 4, 2025, moving 26,732 retail units. Alana Hagues of NintendoLife wrote that these sales numbers were "fairly low" while being standard sales amounts for the Nintendo Switch for the past few weeks. In an interview prior to the release, Kodaka said that "There was a time I was worried about this selling less than a thousand copies, but not anymore." In an interview in July, Kodaka described the game as selling "pretty well" and no longer saw "bankruptcy as a serious future" for Too Kyo. In the first half of 2025, The Hundred Line: Last Defense Academy was among the top 50 most downloaded games for the Nintendo Switch in Japan.

=== Awards and nominations ===
Year	Ceremony	Category	Result	Ref.
2025	Japan Game Awards	Award for Excellence	Won	
2025	Golden Joystick Awards	Best Storytelling	Nominated	
2026	New York Game Awards	Herman Melville Award for Best Writing in a Game	Nominated	
2026	Famitsu Dengeki Game Awards	Scenario Award	Won	
2026	Famitsu Dengeki Game Awards	Rookie Award	Won	
