= World's End Club =

2020 video game

- Developers: Too Kyo Games; Grounding
- Publishers: iOS, macOS, Windows, PlayStation 5, Xbox One, Xbox Series X/S; IzanagiGames; Nintendo Switch; JP: IzanagiGames; WW: NIS America
- Directors: Kazutaka Kodaka; Kotaro Uchikoshi; Takumi Nakazawa
- Producer: Shinsuke Umeda
- Programmer: Shinnosuke Itou
- Artists: Take; Kentarou Yoshida
- Writers: Kotaro Uchikoshi; Takumi Nakazawa; Yoichiro Koizumi
- Composer: Jun Fukuda
- Platforms: iOS; macOS; Nintendo Switch; Windows; PlayStation 5; Xbox One; Xbox Series X/S
- Release: Apple Arcade (iOS/macOS): WW: September 4, 2020; Nintendo Switch: JP: May 27, 2021; WW: May 28, 2021; Windows: WW: November 30, 2021; PlayStation 5: WW: July 13, 2025; Xbox One, Series X/S: WW: February 9, 2026
- Genres: Action-adventure, puzzle
- Mode: Single-player

World's End Club (Note: Japanese: ワールズエンドクラブ, Hepburn: Wāruzu Endo Kurabu) is a puzzle action-adventure game developed by Too Kyo Games and Grounding, and published by IzanagiGames. It was initially released as part of Apple Arcade for iOS and macOS in 2020, for Nintendo Switch and Windows in 2021, for PlayStation 5 in 2025, and for Xbox One and Xbox Series X/S in 2026.

== Plot ==
In 1995 a group of students on a field trip, Reycho and his fellow members of the Go-Getters Club, (consisting of his friends Pochi and Vanilla, Vanilla's older brother Aniki, Chuko, Jennu, Kansai, Mowchan, Nyoro, Pai and Tattsun), survive an explosion near Tokyo. They wake up in an underwater amusement park called World's End Land. There, a magical robot named Pielope forces them to play a "Game of Fate", a life-or-death game of tasks. After Reycho saves his friends, Pielope attempts to start another game, but Pai renounces it on behalf of the mastermind hidden among them, before being hit by a debris. After escaping the underwater amusement park with a submarine, the class arrives at Kagoshima and Pai manages to restore her memory. They investigate all prefectures occupied by enemies, and plan to return to Tokyo. But the group splits off over traveling routes to Fukuoka or Ōita with one group learning it is 1996 while the other recruits a girl named Yuki, each club member awakening their mysterious powers. They reunite in Shikoku, where they meet the Master of a cult dedicated to a powerful artificial intelligence called MAIK, while being pursued by the damaged Pielope. After the incident of Kyoto and Osaka, the group meets the people at the cave, and learn the existence of an Otherworlder opposing MAIK and X-TYPES. They conclude the truth Vanilla is the mastermind trying to undo MAIK's brainwashing experiment, because the facility stored Vanilla's body with suspended animation, with her ghost accompanying her friends. They ride on a train from Nara, but Pielope disables it, unlocking two ending scenarios. In one end, the group are captured by robots and manage to regroup at the Nagoya factory, when MAIK uses the Master. The gang escapes from the facility and the erupting Mount Fuji destroys the helicopter near the ruined Tokyo.

In another ending, the reunited group reach Gifu and find a magical mushroom for them to see ghosts. The ships damage Reycho, revealing him as a robot controlled by Pochi with the others leaving them behind without a second thought. Pochi reveals himself as a robot and is captured by the drones. However, the children hijack one of the ships and save Pochi. MAIK explains to the group that Nyoro's father created it in 1991, predicting humanity had brought chaos. MAIK used nanomachines to turn humans into emotionless and subservient "sheep", while all humans hid themselves underground. But the Go-Getters are immune to nanomachines and possess latent abilities, with Reycho and Pochi placed among them as observers. This revealed the brainwashing was a surgical process to remove limitations while viewing various scenarios and illusions. MAIK plans for them to become humanity's "shepherds" or it will have the nanomachines kill anyone. The group learns Pielope is housing one of MAIK's sub-personalities while learning Vanilla, whose ability is astral projection, is still alive and located near the supercomputer at the park's HEAVEN facility. After the player collects clues from all timelines, Pochi reveals to be an X-TYPE communicating with the Otherworlder. After saving Vanilla, they plan to destroy MAIK's core. The Master reveals that Yuki would be erased upon its demise. Reycho, rebuilt by MAIK as a defense mechanism, attacks his friends, but their group's song causes him to be self-aware and disable the core barrier. Yuki reveals to be MAIK's other sub-personality, directly being connected to the core. To overwrite MAIK's main personality and save Yuki, Pochi and Vanilla hack into the system, while the former directly uploads into the mainframe to stop MAIK. The group uses an administrator account to override the commands and Pochi destroys MAIK with a code intact. They reunite with Reycho and restore humanity.

== Development and release ==
The game was announced in September 2018 at the same time the company Too Kyo Games was announced as one of the four projects being worked. In October 2018, the game had more details announced, with the original title Death March Club (デスマーチクラブ Desu Māchi Kurabu) announced at the time, but it changed to World's End Club in 2020. On September 4, a launch trailer for the game was released, announcing the stealth drop of the game on Apple Arcade, and the upcoming release on Nintendo Switch in spring 2021. In February 2021, during a Nintendo Direct, it was announced that the title would come to Nintendo Switch on May 28, 2021.

Before switching its target platform to Apple Arcade, World's End Club was initially announced only for personal computers; the Windows port was released to be released on November 30, 2021. The Too Kyo Games team worked on the premise, scenario and character design, while the team at Grounding handled the programming, action and graphic design. The game is localized in twelve languages. Kotaro Uchikoshi and Takumi Nakazawa served as the game's directors, and Kazutaka Kodaka served as a creative director. The initial release only featured the Japanese voice over. The game was dubbed in English for its full release.

== Reception ==
Reception

Aggregate scores
Aggregator	Score
Metacritic	iOS: 73/100; NS: 62/100
OpenCritic	19% recommend

Review scores
Publication	Score
Eurogamer	Recommended
Famitsu	8/10, 8/10, 7/10, 8/10
Nintendo Life	5/10
Pocket Gamer	4/5
IGN Japan	7/10

The Apple Arcade and Nintendo Switch versions of World's End Club received "mixed or average reviews" according to review aggregator Metacritic. Fellow review aggregator OpenCritic assessed that the game received weak approval, being recommended by 19% of critics. Sergio Velasquez of Pocket Gamer described the story as interesting and compelling, but not suited for those looking for more action, while Ryan Fabian of NookGaming recommended it to those who love slice-of-life with a hint of mystery, but stated that it doesn't live up to Kotaro Uchikoshi and Kazutaka Kodaka’s previous works.
