= Michi (Japanese singer) =

- Born: Michiko Tōyama; March 30, 1996 (age 30); Okinawa, Japan
- Genres: J-pop
- Label: Pony Canyon
- Website: michi-stbe.com

Michiko Tōyama (當山美智子, born March 30, 1996 in Okinawa, Japan), also known as Michi, is a Japanese J-pop singer.

Produced by Elements Garden, Michi began her career with her debut single, "Cry for the Truth/Secret Sky", which served as the opening and ending theme songs to the anime television series Rokka: Braves of the Six Flowers. Her second single "Checkmate!?" peaked at #51, and was used as the opening song to Dagashi Kashi. Her third single, "Realistic!", was used as the first ending theme to the anime Kuromukuro. She released her first album called "Sprint for the Dreams" on September 21, 2016. Michi was a guest at the 2016 Anime Expo and was a guest at Otakon 2016. Her song "I4U" was used as the ending theme to the 2017 anime television series Tsugumomo. Her song "Soranetarium" (ソラネタリウム) was used as the opening theme to the 2018 anime television series The Girl in Twilight.
