= Memories Off (video game) =

Japanese visual novel

- PlayStation cover art

メモリーズオフ (Memorīzu Ofu)
- Genre: Drama, Romance
- Video game
- Developer: KID
- Publisher: KID (PS, PC, DC, PS2); Success (PS, PS2); 5pb. (PSP, iOS)
- Genre: Visual novel
- Platform: PS, PC, DC, PS2, PSP, iOS
- Released: September 30, 1999 (PS)
- Video game

Memories Off: Pure
- Developer: KID
- Publisher: KID
- Genre: Visual novel
- Platform: Neo Geo Pocket Color
- Released: April 27, 2000
- Original video animation
- Directed by: Yawa Yokota (1); Yukio Okazaki (2–3)
- Produced by: Ken Sekiguchi; Natsuko Kotani
- Written by: Hiroshi Watanabe
- Music by: Chiyomaru Shikura
- Studio: E&G Films
- Released: November 21, 2001 – January 19, 2002
- Runtime: 30 minutes each
- Episodes: 3

Memories Off (メモリーズオフ, Memorīzu Ofu) is a Japanese visual novel developed by KID originally released in Japan on September 30, 1999, for the PlayStation, and was later released for the PC, Dreamcast, PlayStation 2, and the PlayStation Portable. Subsequent versions incorporated new content not found in the original version, such as a second part of the story, Memories Off: Pure, originally released as a separate game for the Neo Geo Pocket Color on April 27, 2000. The gameplay in Memories Off follows a linear plot line, which offers pre-determined scenarios and courses of interaction, and focuses on the appeal of the six female main characters.

Memories Off has made several transitions to other media. A manga anthology was published in August 2000 by Enterbrain. It was followed by an original video animation series produced by E&G Films released on three DVDs and VHSs between November 11, 2001, and March 8, 2002. Three novels and a drama CD were also produced.

== Gameplay ==
A conversation in Memories Off depicting the main character talking to Ayaka.

The gameplay in Memories Off requires little player interaction as much time is spent on reading the text that appears on the lower portion of the screen, representing either dialogue between characters, or the inner thoughts of the protagonist. Every so often, the player will come to a "decision point", where he or she is given the chance to choose from multiple options. The time between these points is variable and can occur anywhere from a minute to much longer. Gameplay pauses at these points and depending on which choice the player makes, the plot will progress in a specific direction. There are six main plot lines that the player will have the chance to experience, one for each of the heroines in the story. To view all five plot lines, the player will have to replay the game multiple times and make different decisions to progress the plot in an alternate direction.

In the versions subsequent to the original PS and PC releases, a second scenario called Pure is made available after the scenarios for the heroines, 1st Story, are completed. Pure covers the story set three years prior to the main portion of the game and revolves around Tomoya, Ayaka and Yue when they are still attending middle school. A third scenario called After Story is available immediately upon starting a new game in the PSP version. After Story is a continuation of the first portion of the game. Unlike the other scenarios, After Story is not accompanied by voice acting, character sprites and choices, allowing one to enjoy the story without any interaction.

== Plot and characters ==
The story of Memories Off revolves around the male protagonist Tomoya Mikami (三上 智也, Mikami Tomoya; Voiced by: Hikaru Midorikawa), a cynical seventeen-year-old student whose role the player assumes, and his interactions with his schoolmates during his second year attending the Sumisora Academy (澄空学園, Sumisora Gakuen), in which the main part of the story takes place. Tomoya meets Yue Imasaka (今坂唯笑, Imasaka Yue; Voiced by: Megumi Nasu), a childhood friend one day on a train en route to school. Yue is a lively and innocent, but clumsy girl. She is the main heroine of the story, and has a crush on Tomoya, but decided not to pursue him early on. Tomoya later also meets Kaoru Otowa (音羽かおる, Otowa Kaoru; Voiced by: Yukari Tamura), another heroine. Kaoru is a girl who transfers into Tomoya's class near the beginning of the story. She maintains a cheerful personality and articulate social skills, and excels in language subjects.

Tomoya later also encounters Shion Futami (双海詩音, Futami Shion; Voiced by: Yūko Kagata), Memories Off's third heroine. Shion is a girl who transferred into Tomoya's class in the past semester. She has a calm personality, and prefers to be isolated. Like Kaoru, Shion excels in language, and shows an interest in literature to the extent where she became a librarian. He also meets Koyomi Kirishima (霧島小夜美, Kirishima Koyomi; Voiced by: Ruri Asano), another heroine. Koyomi is actually a university student, but commutes to the school in order to substitute her mother as the cashier for the school for a week. She is kind and caring, but is also clumsy when collecting payments. She has two pet hamsters named Ggakdugi and Namul. Tomoya later also meets Minamo Ibuki (伊吹みなも, Ibuki Minamo; Voiced by: Kumi Tanaka), Memories Off's fifth heroine and an underclassman. Minamo has a lively personality, and also holds an interest in art. Due to her weak health, she has to constantly commute to hospitals.

Tomoya is constantly reminded of his previous romantic interest Ayaka Hizuki (桧月 彩花, Hizuki Ayaka; Voiced by: Maria Yamamoto), the main focus of the Pure story segment, as he continues his interactions with his many schoolmates. Ayaka is Tomoya and Yue's childhood friend and is Minamo's cousin. She maintains a kind and well-mannered, but timid personality. She passes away after being involved in a traffic accident towards the end of the Pure segment to Tomoya's dismay, leading him to constantly struggle to overcome with her death, and acts callously towards others.

== Development and release ==
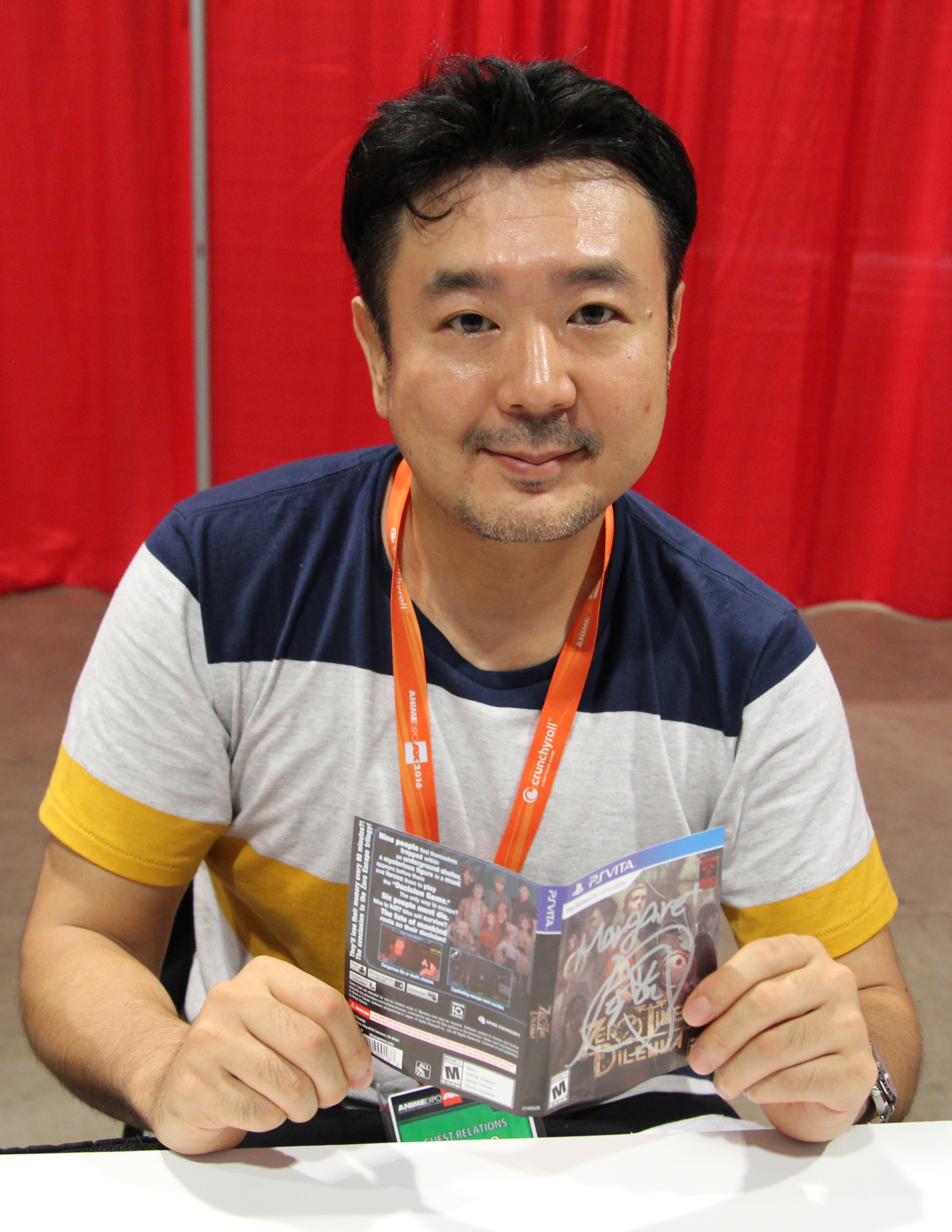
The writing team included Kotaro Uchikoshi, who worked on Ayaka's and Yue's story.

Like most of the previous games developed by KID, Memories Off was developed as an all-ages title, and does not contain any risqué situations. Art direction was headed by Yukihiro Matsuo, while character designs were provided by Mutsumi Sasaki. The scenario in the game was split between six people. Kotaro Uchikoshi worked on Ayaka's and Yue's story; Chabō Higurashi worked on Shion's story; Riichirō Abe worked on Miyako's story; Nobuhito Takabayashi worked on Kaoru's story; Tomohiro Sasaki worked on Minamo's story; and TAS who contributed to Ayaka's story. Music from the game was composed entirely by Takeshi Abo.

The original PlayStation and PC versions of Memories Off have one piece of theme music. The ending theme "This May Be the Last Time we can Meet" was performed by Maria Yamamoto, composed by Hidehiko Katō, written by Kaoru Akizuki, and arranged by Sunflower. Two more pieces of theme music were used in the Dreamcast version and the subsequent releases, one opening theme and one ending theme. The opening theme is "Wings of Bravery" (勇気の翼, Yūki no Tsubasa) and was performed by Maria Yamamoto; the final ending theme was "Gentle Constellation" (やさしい星座, Yasashī Seiza), and was performed by Kaori. Both songs were first introduced in the OVA series, and were composed, and written by Chiyomaru Shikura. A new opening theme was introduced in the PlayStation Portable version, in addition to the original opening theme. The opening theme, titled "Eternal Memories" (永遠のメモリーズ, Eien no Memorīzu) and performed and written by Ayane, is shared by the PSP version of Memories Off 2nd as the game's opening theme.

Memories Off was first released to the public on September 30, 1999, for the PlayStation. It was later released for the PC on March 16, 2000, and was later accompanied by a prequel titled Memories Off: Pure released for the Neo Geo Pocket Color, on April 27, 2000. An enhanced re-release for the Dreamcast, titled Memories Off Complete was released on June 20, 2000, with the scenario found in Pure. A second PlayStation release published by Success was released on July 19, 2000, at a cheaper price than the original.

Memories Off was later released in China on December 20, 2001, for the PC. A PlayStation 2 version was subsequently released in South Korea by Mdream on December 12, 2002, followed by a Hong Kong and Taiwanese release on March 6, 2003, published by T-Time Technology. The PlayStation 2 game was later released in Japan with Memories Off 2nd as Memories Off Duet on March 27, 2003, and contained additional scenarios. It was followed by another Hong Kong and Taiwanese release, on July 2, 2003, for the PC published by T-Time Technology. A second PlayStation 2 release in Japan, published by Success, was released on August 5, 2004, at a cheaper price than the original release. A PlayStation Portable version was released in limited and regular editions on May 29, 2008. The limited edition included the game itself, an image song disc, a soundtrack disc, development materials, a novel titled After Story already contained in the game itself, and a collector's box; the regular edition did not contain the aforementioned extras. An iOS version was released on September 1, 2009.

Memories Off was released on PlayStation 4 and Nintendo Switch in Japan as part of Memories Off Historia Vol. 1 compilation in 2021.

== Reception ==
Memories Off Complete, the Dreamcast version of the original visual novel, was well received by RPGFan, and was given an 83% from their grading scale. The reviewer praised the game's soundtrack and the game's Pure scenario, citing "it was very sweet, often funny, and it was wonderful seeing Tomoya's friendship with Ayaka and Yue", though noted the game's visuals and voice acting as "decent, but unremarkable". The reviewer concluded that although the game is not the most polished title, "it is a genre classic, and rightfully so".

According to Uchikoshi, he received a lot of criticism from players after the game came out, who told him that he did not understand bishōjo games, and how the protagonist is supposed to be the player. This had a large impact on him, and influenced his later visual novel Ever 17: The Out of Infinity.

== Related media ==
The game's original soundtrack was released on December 18, 1999, by Scitron containing six background music tracks, three sound dramas, and two vocal tracks. A piano arrangement album was released on November 20, 2002, containing twelve tracks from the Memories Off series, and was followed by a second piano arrangement album released on October 22, 2003, containing thirteen tracks from the series. An arrange album titled Memories Off Orgel Collection was released on December 22, 2004, which contained nine tracks from the Memories Off visual novel and OVA, out of a total of thirty-seven tracks. An 8-bit arrange album entitled Memories Off 8bit Arrange was released on September 25, 2006, containing two discs, which contained thirty-five tracks from the Memories Off series in total.

A series of six image song singles were also released by Scitron for the heroines from the game, featuring their respective voice actress. The first single, for Ayaka, was released on September 6, 2000; the second single, for Shion, was released on January 11, 2001; the third and fourth singles, for Kaoru and Koyomi respectively, were released on March 7, 2001; the fifth single, for Yue, was released on April 11, 2001; the sixth and final single, for Minamo, was released on May 9, 2001, along with a collector's box which can fit the six image song singles inside.

Memories Off was adapted into a series of three novels, written by Chabō Higurashi and published by Enterbrain under their Famitsu Bunko publishing label. The first, entitled Drop of Memories (想い出の雫, Omoide no Shizuku), was released in June 2000; the second, entitled "Anniversary" (アニヴァーサリー, Anivāsarī), was released in March 2001; the third, entitled Concerto, was released in November 2002. A manga anthology entitled Memories Off Visual Comic Anthology (Magical Cute) was also released in August 2000 as one volume published by Enterbrain. Another novel, written by Tomoco Kanemaki, was released by Jive under their Jive Character Novels publishing label in March 2005 based on Shion's point of view.

Memories Off was also adapted into a three-episode original video animation series produced by E&G Films. The OVA was originally released on three separate DVDs and VHSs by Scitron, each containing a thirty-minute episode. The first volume, titled "The Unending Rain: Yue Chapter" (終わらない雨 ～唯笑編～, Owaranai Ame: Yue-hen) was released on November 21, 2001, and was directed by Yawa Yokota with screenplay written by Akira Watanabe. The second and third volume, entitled "The Masked Heart: Shion Chapter" (仮面の心〜詩音編〜, Kamen no Kokoro: Shion-hen) and "The Golden Sea: Minamo Chapter" (黄金の海〜みなも編〜, Ōgon no Umi: Minamo-hen), was released on December 19, 2001, and January 23, 2002, and was directed by Yukio Okazaki.
