= Death Come True =

2020 video game

- Japanese PlayStation 4 box art
- Developers: Too Kyo Games; Esquadra
- Publisher: IzanagiGames
- Director: Kazutaka Kodaka
- Producer: Shinsuke Umeda
- Programmer: Kazuya Honda
- Writer: Kazutaka Kodaka
- Composer: Masafumi Takada
- Engine: Unity
- Platforms: Nintendo Switch, Android, iOS, macOS, Windows, PlayStation 4, PlayStation 5, Xbox One
- Release: June 24, 2020: Switch; NA: June 24, 2020; JP: June 25, 2020; EU: June 26, 2020; AU: June 27, 2020 Android, iOS, macOS; WW: June 25, 2020 Windows; WW: July 17, 2020 PlayStation 4; WW: November 12, 2020 PlayStation 5; WW: September 19, 2024 Xbox One; WW: October 7, 2024
- Genres: Adventure, interactive film
- Mode: Single-player

Death Come True (Note: Japanese: デスカムトゥルー, Hepburn: Desu Kamu Turū) is a 2020 interactive film adventure game developed by Too Kyo Games and Esquadra and published by IzanagiGames for the Nintendo Switch, Android, iOS, macOS, Windows, PlayStation 4, PlayStation 5 and Xbox One. The game was written and directed by Kazutaka Kodaka, known as the creator of the Danganronpa series.

== Gameplay ==
Death Come True is an interactive film adventure game in which the player is tasked with finding clues and uncovering the truth of the protagonist's actions. The player has the ability to "time leap" with Karaki, who can be sent to the past.

== Plot ==
The game follows Makoto Karaki (Kanata Hongō) as he wakes up in a strange hotel room after having lost all of his memories. When turning on the television, he finds out that he is a serial killer.

As Karaki investigates the hotel, he finds it impossible to leave as all of the exits are sealed. He also meets two police investigators, Akane Sachimura (Chiaki Kuriyama) and Nozomu Kuji (Win Morisaki) who are investigating him on the suspicion that he is a serial killer wanted for strangling numerous women. However, Karaki finds himself inexplicably drawn to Sachimura. After dying several times in the course of his investigations, Karaki eventually begins to recover some of his memories and confronts the hotel Concierge (Yuki Kaji), questioning if the hotel is even real. The Concierge reveals that the hotel is actually a virtual reality space created by the "Come True" system, which is capable of recreating memories from living or deceased individuals that others can view through virtual reality reconstruction. While intended for the treatment of mental illnesses, the Come True is secretly being used for police investigations. Karaki himself is actually another Investigator who connected the real Karaki and Sachimura, both deceased in the real world, to find the truth behind Sachimura's death.

The Concierge then warns the Investigator that an unknown party is hacking Come True in an attempt to delete the hotel, which also caused the Investigator to lose his memories and mistakenly believe himself to be Karaki. The Concierge suggests that the Investigator escape the hotel, which he always had the choice to do whenever he dies. However, the Investigator continues his search for the truth. With more of his memories coming back, he and Sachimura confront Kuji, suspecting him to be Sachimura's real killer. Sachimura suspected Kuji of corruption, so he made a deal with Karaki to murder her in return for passage out of the country, but Kuji betrayed him and killed him instead. The hacker, the real Kuji, then appears and admits that he is indeed guilty. However, he gives the Investigator a proposition. Rather than return to the real world and reveal Kuji's crimes, he can instead stay in the virtual world with Sachimura forever.

If the Investigator chooses to stay in the virtual world, Kuji escapes, though he warns the pair not to leave the hotel since the virtual world outside is unknown. The Investigator and Sachimura decide to leave the hotel, and live happily together in an unstable virtual world created from Sachimura's memories.

If the Investigator chooses to leave the virtual world, he follows clues left behind by Sachimura to find the evidence she gathered proving Kuji's corruption. As a result, Kuji is arrested and investigated for his involvement in Sachimura's murder and the killings performed by Karaki.

== Development and release ==
Death Come True was developed by Too Kyo Games and Esquadra and published by IzanagiGames, written and directed by Kazutaka Kodaka with music by Masafumi Takada. Esquadra was responsible for the primary development work. It was released for Android, iOS, macOS, and Nintendo Switch on June 24 in Japan, June 25 in North America, June 26 in Europe, and June 27, 2020, in Australia. It was also released for Windows on July 17, 2020, for PlayStation 4 on November 12, 2020, for PlayStation 5 on September 19, 2024, and for Xbox One on October 7, 2024.

== Reception ==
Reception

Aggregate scores
Aggregator	Score
Metacritic	iOS: 72/100; NS: 75/100; PC: 69/100
OpenCritic	58% recommend

Review scores
Publication	Score
Destructoid	7/10
Famitsu	9/10, 8/10, 10/10, 7/10
Pocket Gamer	2/5
RPGFan	75%
TouchArcade	4/5

According to the review aggregation website Metacritic, Death Come True was generally well received by critics on Nintendo Switch, while the iOS version saw "mixed or average" reviews. Fellow review aggregator OpenCritic assessed that the game received strong approval, being recommended by 58% of critics.
