= Kotaro Uchikoshi =

Japanese video game director (born 1973)

- 打越 鋼太郎
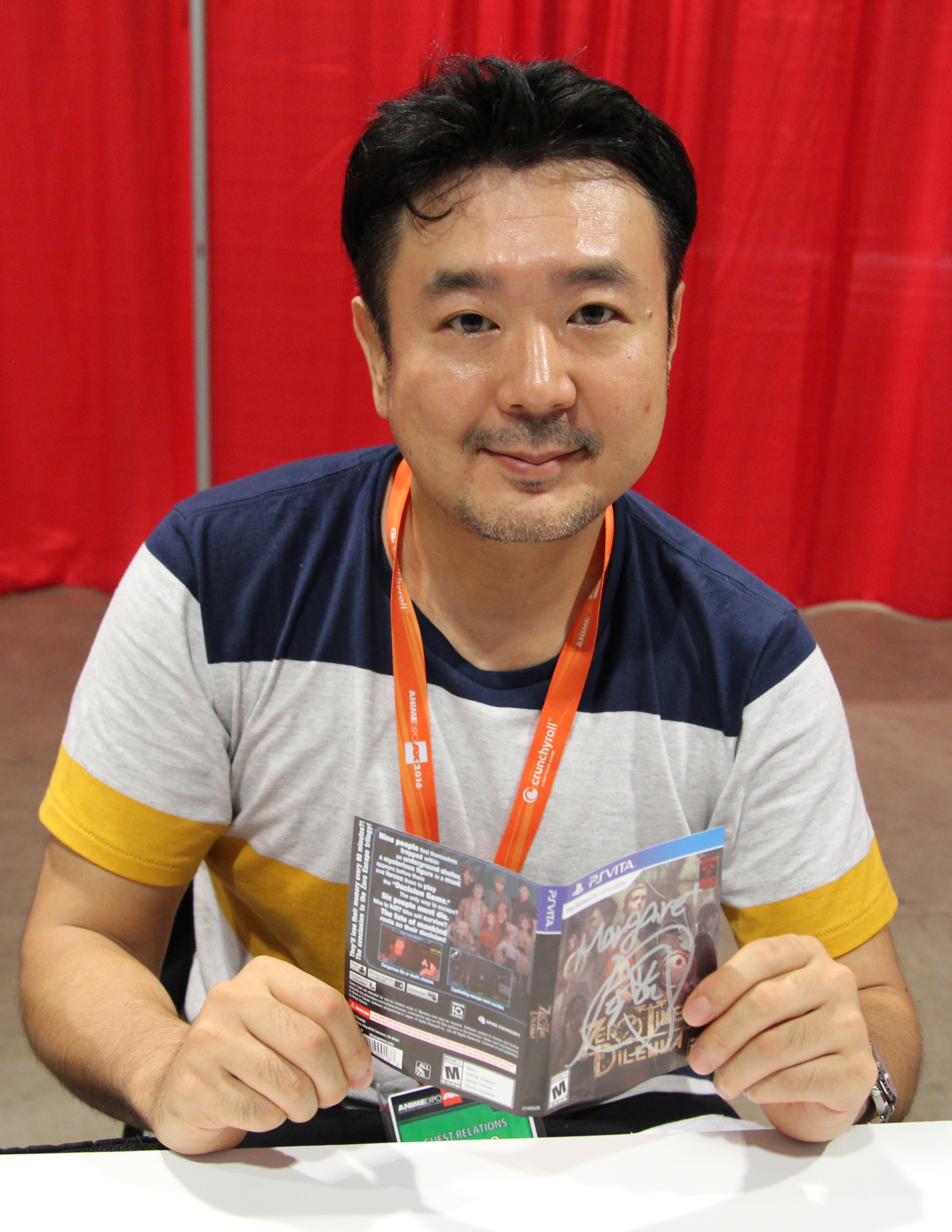
- Uchikoshi at Anime Expo 2016
- Born: November 17, 1973 (age 52); Higashimurayama, Tokyo, Japan
- Other name: Hagane Tsukishio (Note: Hagane Tsukishio (槻潮 鋼, Tsukishio Hagane)) (pseudonym)
- Occupations: Video game director, writer
- Years active: 1998–present
- Employers: KID (1998–2001); Spike Chunsoft (2007–2017); Too Kyo Games (2017–present)
- Notable work: Infinity; Zero Escape; AI: The Somnium Files

Kotaro Uchikoshi (打越 鋼太郎, Uchikoshi Kōtarō; born November 17, 1973) is a Japanese video game director and writer. He is known for his work on visual novel games, including the Infinity and Zero Escape series. His writing style often incorporates elements of science fiction with various scientific and philosophical themes, and makes heavy use of plot twists.

Interested in narrative based games from a young age, Uchikoshi studied video game development at a vocational school. His first job in game development was at KID in 1998, where he primarily wrote scenarios for bishōjo games and other visual novels. These included Memories Off (1999) and Never 7: The End of Infinity (2000). In 2001, he left KID to become a freelance writer, and continued to work on visual novels. Uchikoshi joined Chunsoft in 2007, where he came up with the idea of integrating puzzles into a visual novel for the player to solve. He implemented this idea in Nine Hours, Nine Persons, Nine Doors (2009), the first game in which he served as the director.

Both Nine Hours, Nine Persons, Nine Doors and its sequel Zero Escape: Virtue's Last Reward (2012) were commercial failures in Japan. When Chunsoft put the Zero Escape series on hiatus, Uchikoshi returned to freelance work, and wrote his first anime series, Punch Line (2015). He also worked on a manga and video game adaptation of Punch Line. A large fan presence helped revive the Zero Escape series, and Uchikoshi returned to write and direct the concluding installment, Zero Time Dilemma (2016). In 2017, he formed the video game developer Too Kyo Games together with Danganronpa series staff members and his Infinity co-writer Takumi Nakazawa. Shortly after, he wrote the concept for the anime series The Girl in Twilight (2018), directed and wrote the adventure game AI: The Somnium Files (2019), and returned to write its sequel, AI: The Somnium Files – Nirvana Initiative (2022), both for Spike Chunsoft. At Tookyo Games, Uchikoshi co-directed World's End Club (2021) with Nakazawa and Kazutaka Kodaka, and co-directed The Hundred Line: Last Defense Academy (2025) with Kodaka.

== Life ==
Uchikoshi was born on November 17, 1973, in Higashimurayama, Tokyo. Almost immediately after birth, he began choking on amniotic fluid, and claims he would have died had his doctor not held him upside down and "hit his backside". Uchikoshi was born with torticollis, which required surgery when he was three years old. While in middle school, he read gamebooks written by Steve Jackson, which instilled an interest in narrative-based games.

He studied management engineering in college, but dropped out and spent a year without a job. Uchikoshi then enrolled in the vocational school Vantan Design Institute, where he studied video game planning, 3D modelling, 2D art, sound, and programming. Vantan was founded as a school for clothes design, and only branched into game development later; according to Uchikoshi, the teachers were not well versed in video games, which led to uninteresting courses and many students dropping out. Eventually, only Uchikoshi and a few others attended classes, which resulted in the teachers being able to better focus and take care of the smaller group of students who still attended; because of this, Uchikoshi says that he and the other remaining students were able to achieve a higher level of proficiency.

=== Career ===
Uchikoshi's first job in game development was in 1998 when he joined KID, a company known for bishōjo games. At the time, KID was also developing video game adaptations of board games; he originally joined KID because of these board game projects, as he was interested in making simple games that a lot of people would be able to enjoy. His first project at KID however was designing 3D models for the action game Pepsiman (1999). Sometime after the release of Pepsiman, a producer at KID asked him to write a scenario for an upcoming bishōjo game. Uchikoshi believes he was chosen because of his personality and experience with writing. The first bishōjo game he worked on was the visual novel Memories Off (1999), followed by Never 7: The End of Infinity, Memories Off Pure and Memories Off 2nd (all 2000). While writing Never 7: The End of Infinity, Uchikoshi wanted to include science fiction themes, but was instructed by his superiors to instead focus on the romantic relationships between the game's characters.

In 2001, Uchikoshi left KID to become a freelance writer and developer; this was the result of a need for independence, and the ability to work for other companies besides KID. Over the next few years, he worked on several games, including Close To: Inori no Oka (2001), Ever 17: The Out of Infinity (2002), and Remember 11: The Age of Infinity (2004). He also wrote two erotic visual novels, the first was a 2003 game which he was uncredited for and whose title he does not remember, and the second was Eve: New Generation (2006).

While working as a freelance writer, Uchikoshi was contacted by the game development company Chunsoft about a possible job offering. Looking to provide a stable income for his wife and daughter, he accepted the company's offer in 2007. Chunsoft had developed several mystery visual novels in the past, such as Kamaitachi no Yoru (1994), but wanted to create a new type of visual novel that could appeal to a wider audience. Uchikoshi came up with the idea to include puzzles that are integrated within the story, and need to be solved in order for the player to make progress. He began implementing and expanding upon these ideas in Nine Hours, Nine Persons, Nine Doors (2009), in which he served as the game director, planner, and scenario writer. Although the game was a commercial failure in Japan, its unexpected critical success in North America prompted Uchikoshi to continue the series.

The sequel to Nine Hours, Nine Persons, Nine Doors was Zero Escape: Virtue's Last Reward (2012). In an attempt to reduce costs, Uchikoshi asked Chunsoft if he could develop Virtue's Last Reward and its eventual sequel simultaneously, as both games would use the same game engine and digital assets; Chunsoft agreed to the proposal. Uchikoshi maintained his duties as the director, planner, and scenario writer. Despite positive international reviews, Virtue's Last Reward was another commercial failure in Japan. As a result, Chunsoft placed the game's sequel on indefinite hiatus, effectively concluding the Zero Escape series. Uchikoshi examined the possibility of financing the development through the use of crowdfunding on a website like Kickstarter, but felt that the idea was "not quite persuasive enough".

After Virtue's Last Reward, Uchikoshi returned to freelance work. He wrote a scenario for Steins;Gate: Linear Bounded Phenogram (2013) before working on his first non-game related project, the anime series Punch Line (2015). Uchikoshi wrote the episode scripts, which he noted were more cinematic in tone than most of his previous projects. The series ran on Japanese television from April to June 2015. Uchikoshi also wrote a Punch Line manga, which began serialization in September, and a video game adaptation, released in 2016.

Meanwhile, fans of the Zero Escape series created an online campaign to raise awareness and support the development of a sequel to Virtue's Last Reward. Uchikoshi noted that the fan presence was a key factor for the sequel's reevaluation. While delivering the pitch for the game, he used a fan-made vocal rendition of the series theme song; Spike Chunsoft (Note: Chunsoft merged with the Japanese company Spike in 2012, and was renamed Spike Chunsoft.) agreed to the proposal, and green-lit production of Zero Time Dilemma (2016). With Zero Time Dilemma, Uchikoshi intended to resolve all mysteries left from the previous two games in the series, as well as those introduced in the third. Following the game's release, he remarked that having devoted the last decade of his life to the series, he was saddened to see it finally come to an end. His next two projects were announced in 2017: the escape room game The Pop Star's Room of Doom, and the video game AI: The Somnium Files. Another anime project, The Girl in Twilight, was announced in 2018, for which Uchikoshi wrote the original concept.

In 2018, it was announced that Uchikoshi had left Spike Chunsoft and formed a new, independent video game developer, Too Kyo Games, together with writer Kazutaka Kodaka and composer Masafumi Takada, both of whom previously worked on the Danganronpa series at Spike Chunsoft. Other Danganronpa staff members, and Uchikoshi's fellow Infinity writer Takumi Nakazawa, also joined the company. At Too Kyo Games, Uchikoshi has the role of scenario writer and game director, and has written two video games: World's End Club, an action-adventure game involving children playing a death game, and The Hundred Line: Last Defense Academy, a tactical role-playing game co-written with Kodaka.

== Writing style and philosophy ==
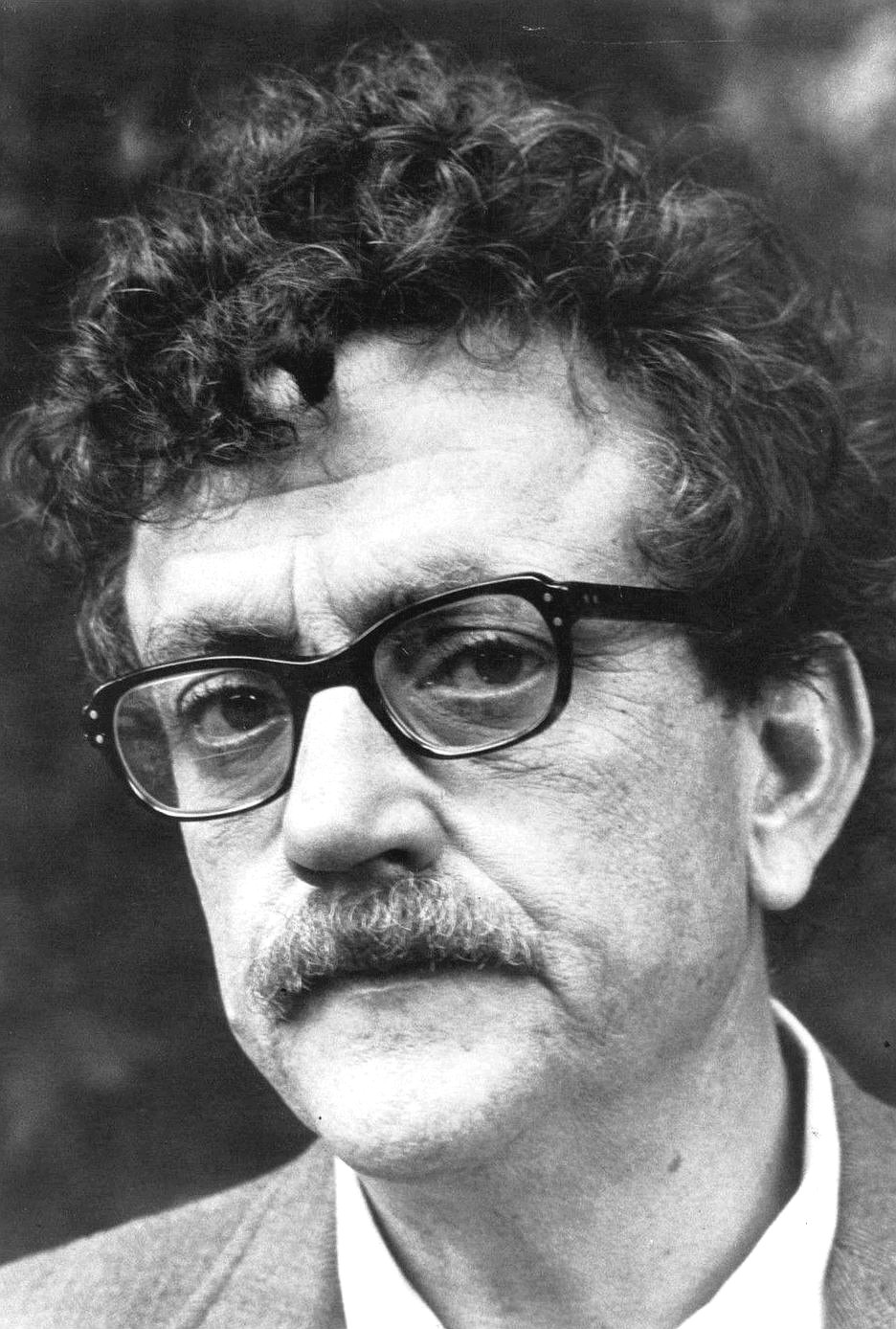
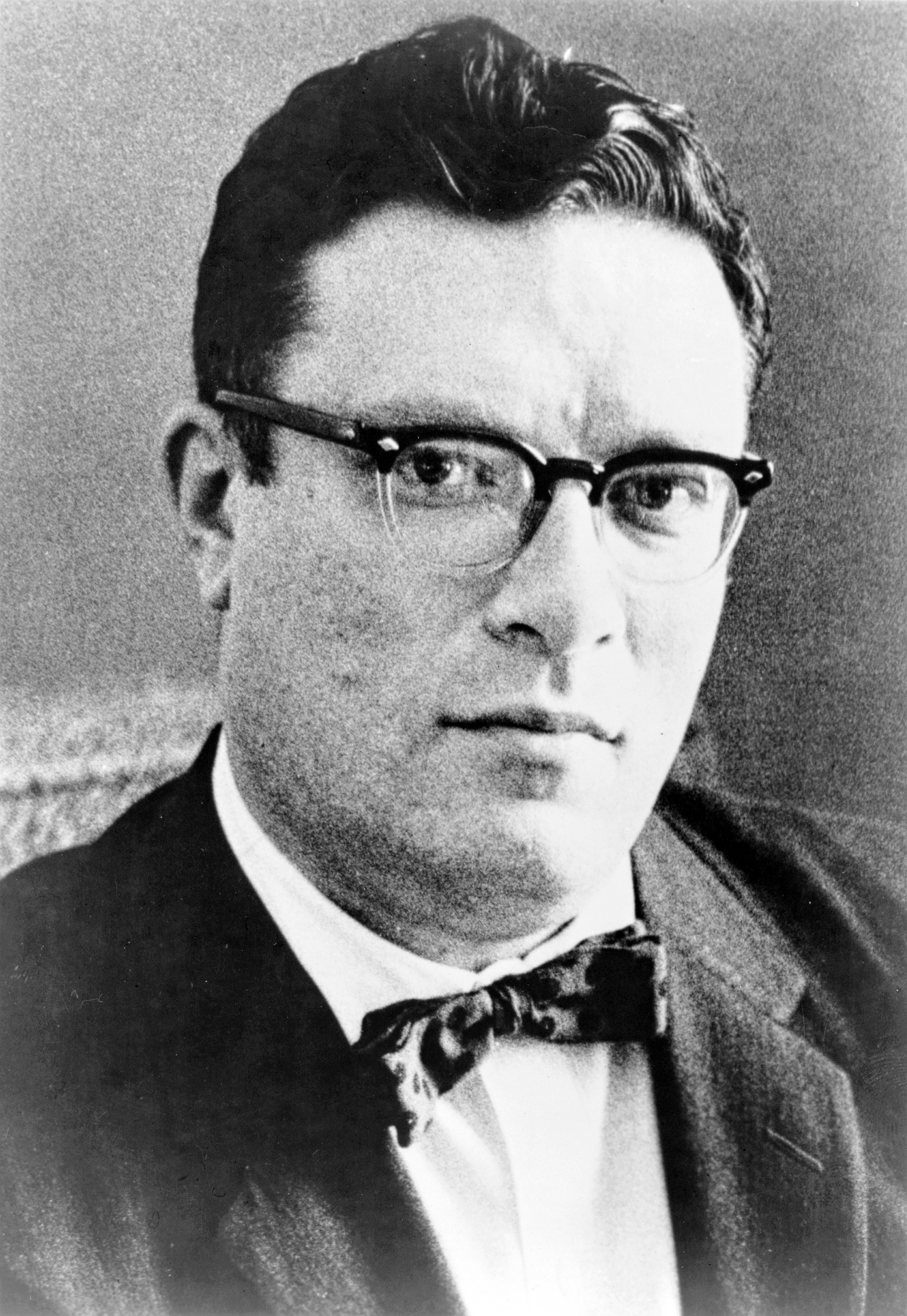
Uchikoshi's influences include science fiction writers Kurt Vonnegut (left) and Isaac Asimov.

As a writer, Uchikoshi prioritizes storylines over characters, with the goal to write a story that people will remember regardless of the overall quality. He first writes the basic outline of a story. With plot twist heavy stories, he will typically work on the ending first and continue backwards, in order to not get confused when writing the plot. This method of writing, referred to by Uchikoshi as the "deductive composition method", was not used in his earlier works; Ever 17: The Out of Infinity was written using the "inductive composition method", where a setting is created first, and a story is created to support the setting, something he described as a gamble, with the risk of an uninteresting story. He also likes to work non-sequentially, writing multiple scenes in parallel.

After crafting a story, Uchikoshi attempts to create a balanced cast of characters with regards to genders, personalities, and ages. He used the Enneagram of Personality as a reference while creating the characters for Nine Hours, Nine Persons, Nine Doors and Virtue's Last Reward. He purposefully does not give the main character of the story a strong personality in order for the player to more easily empathize with them. Although the character dialogue is usually written with an international audience in mind, Uchikoshi will sometimes incorporate humorous or important lines aimed towards Japanese audiences. This style of writing can be seen in Nine Hours, Nine Persons, Nine Doors, as a vital plot point hinged on a Japanese pun, which forced the localization team to play through the entire game again to determine if the story still made sense in English.

Uchikoshi believes the most important aspect of writing visual novels is to envision what the player will think about in each scene, saying that he always has "a conversation with an imaginary player" when writing stories. Uchikoshi's works often deal with scientific and philosophical themes, including idealism, Rupert Sheldrake's theory of morphic resonance, and the prisoner's dilemma. When asked about this, he noted that he often has them in mind before writing a story, and collects web pages related to the topics. Once he has completed the final preparations for a story, he will choose which topics interest him and conduct further research. Among his influences are science fiction writers Isaac Asimov and Kurt Vonnegut. Uchikoshi believes ninety percent of any creative work consists of pieces from others' works, and that the remaining ten percent is creativity, with the result hinging on how well a writer can incorporate their influences with their own ideas.

== Works ==
=== Video games ===
Uchikoshi's work on video games
Year	Title	Role(s)	Notes	Ref.
1999	Pepsiman	3D modeller		
1999	Memories Off	Designer, writer		
2000	Never 7: The End of Infinity	Designer, writer		
2000	Memories Off Pure	Writer		
2001	Close To: Inori no Oka	Writer		
2001	Memories Off 2nd	Designer, writer		
2002	Ever 17: The Out of Infinity	Designer, writer		
2003	Unknown erotic visual novel	Writer		
2004	Remember 11: The Age of Infinity	Writer	Credited under the alias Tsukishio Hagane	
2006	EVE: New Generation	Designer, writer		
2006	Kamaitachi no Yoru Niwango-ban	Writer		
2008	12Riven: The Psi-Climinal of Integral	Designer, writer		
2009	999: Nine Hours, Nine Persons, Nine Doors	Director, designer, writer		
2012	Zero Escape: Virtue's Last Reward	Director, designer, writer		
2013	Steins;Gate: Linear Bounded Phenogram	Writer	Wrote the scenario "Abduction Across Three Worlds"	
2016	Punch Line	Writer		
2016	Zero Time Dilemma	Director, writer		
2019	AI: The Somnium Files	Director, writer		
2020	World's End Club	Director, writer		
2022	AI: The Somnium Files – Nirvana Initiative	Writer		
2025	The Hundred Line: Last Defense Academy	Director, writer, original concept, designer		
2025	No Sleep for Kaname Date – From AI: The Somnium Files	Series director, scenario supervisor		

=== Other ===
Uchikoshi's work on other media
Year	Title	Role	Notes	Ref.
2015	Punch Line	Writer	Anime television series	
2015	Punch Line Max	Original concept	Manga series	
2017	The Pop Star's Room of Doom	Scenario writer	Escape room organized by Scrap in Japan and the US	
2018	The Girl in Twilight	Original concept	Anime television series	
