= Punch Line (video game) =

2016 video game

- European cover art, featuring (clockwise from left) Mikatan, Meika, Rabura, Ito, Yuta, and Chiranosuke
- Developer: 5pb.
- Publishers: JP: 5pb.; NA/EU: PQube
- Director: Takumi Nakazawa
- Producer: Kazuhiro Ichikawa
- Artist: Shōta Iwasaki
- Writer: Kotaro Uchikoshi
- Composer: Tetsuya Komuro
- Platforms: PlayStation 4; PlayStation Vita; Microsoft Windows
- Release: PlayStation 4, PlayStation Vita: JP: April 28, 2016; EU: August 31, 2018; NA: October 9, 2018; Microsoft Windows: WW: May 23, 2019
- Genres: Adventure, visual novel
- Mode: Single-player

Punch Line (Note: Punch Line (Japanese: パンチライン, Hepburn: Panchi Rain)) is a visual novel adventure video game developed by 5pb., based on the anime television series of the same name. It was published for the PlayStation 4 and PlayStation Vita by 5pb. in Japan in 2016, and was published by PQube overseas in 2018. A Microsoft Windows version was released in 2019. The player controls Yuta Iridatsu, a ghost who seeks to return to his body, and solves puzzles while haunting a house and using poltergeist abilities such as possession.

The game was written by Kotaro Uchikoshi and scored by Tetsuya Komuro, with character designs by Shōta Iwasaki, all three of whom previously worked on the Punch Line anime, and was directed by Takumi Nakazawa and produced by Kazuhiro Ichikawa. Owing to its origins as an anime adaptation, the game is structured akin to an interactive anime, and intersplices scenes from the anime show into its narrative.

== Story ==
On December 21, Yuta Iridatsu's spirit is forced out of his body while he is unconscious on the riverbank. A ghost cat called Chiranosuke explains to him another spirit forced him out of his body, and is now occupying it. In order to get his body back he needs to find a book called the "Nandara Gandara". If Yuta sees panties twice in a row, an asteroid will hit the Earth. Yuta begins seeking the Nandara Gandara around Korai House, the building where he is temporarily living alongside four women, while his sister, Akina Iridatsu, is in America.

Over the course of the next few days, it is revealed to both Yuta and the fellow residents that Mikatan Narugino is the super heroine Strange Juice and that Meika Daihatsu, who acts as Strange Juice's navigator called "Pumpkin Chair", is a robot who was created by Dr. Tenga for the purposes of bringing together a team called "Justice Punch". Yuta also learns about the Qmay Group, a religious cult who claim that the world governments are collaborating to hide the impending collision of an asteroid called VR-1". The Korai House residents have an encounter with a masked man (who they dub the "Turtle Man") who wants to capture Muhi, a pet bear cub owned by Ito Hikiotani. During the encounter Muhi is saved by a strange consumed hero calling himself Kenji Miyazawa. Muhi also displays regenerative abilities. Over the following days Yuta unravels the mystery surrounding the deaths of Ito's classmates. It is revealed that Turtle Man is the culprit, and that Turtle Man's identity is Chihaya Tomoda, one of Ito's teachers who had wanted revenge on the girls who were bullying Ito at school. Although he had also been working the spirit of Qmay Tsubouchi, the leader of the Qmay Group who died a month earlier, and had been possessing his body.

On New Year's Eve, it is revealed via Meika telling the other residents of Korai House that Yuta is a biological female with a male identity. This is why she is allowing him to stay in a female lodging. Kenji Miyazawa, who is revealed to be Yuta's physical body, informs the spirit Yuta that VR-1 will soon collide with Earth. He gives his spirit the Nandara Gandara, which has one word in it, "U-Turn". Yuta realises that this is an instruction to travel back to December 21. With his spirit power level and his will to save his friends, Yuta possesses his own body on the riverbank on December 21, thereby forcing the spirit out of his past self's body. Chiranosuke informs him that this loop has been occurring for billions of iterations, but every single time, the Yuta on this side of the loop failed to prevent VR-1 from hitting the Earth, and thus had to pass the buck to the "next iteration" in the form of the Nandara Gandara. However, Chiranosuke comes from one "happy and peaceful future" where an iteration of Yuta succeeds. Yuta realises that this is the reason why an asteroid would hit the Earth if he became "too excited" as a spirit, as the excitement overloaded his physical body that his spirit was attached to, causing him to die, and preventing him from stopping VR-1.

It is revealed to the player that as a child Yuta used to be a test subject at a Qmay Group run lab called Uber Labs called Pine, alongside his two female friends, Chiyoko, and Guriko. The lab looked into the ability of "uberfication", in which the body pushes itself past human limits, but at the cost of weakening the body. After this escape from the lab, a freak lightning strike during a car accident had caused the spirits of the children to get swapped around: Guriko went into Pine's body, Pine went into Chiyoko's body, and Chiyoko went into Guriko's body. Pine had been found, inside Chiyoko's body, by the Iridatsu family, and was adopted as "Yu Iridatsu". He eventually began to live his life presenting himself as boy called "Yuta"; those in the know, like his sister, assumed he was gender-confused. Meanwhile, Chiyoko had been raised by the researcher who had helped them escape, but was later raised by Meika. She was raised by Meika as Mikatan Narugino and Meika trained her into becoming the hero, Strange Juice.

Yuta alters history to prevent Tomoda from killing Ito's classmates. From Tomoda he learns that the Qmay Group's goal is to create a new perfect world where "Ws", people with the ability to "uberfy" eternally, are the only people left. For this, they need Muhi's regenerative abilities. Muhi had been the result of Qmay experimentation, but Rabura's brother, Rando, who had once been a member of Qmay, betrayed them, and gave the bear to Rabura's cousin, Ito. Yuta and Mikatan learn that they are Pine and Chiyoko, respectively, and that their female friend, Guriko, is a member of Qmay. Guriko--who now go by a male identity called Teraoka Ryuuto--has been disguising themselves as Gliese, Rabura's boyfriend, and posing as a US government personal. Teraoka has been taking control of Qmay from the inside, partly out of revenge by trying to undermine Qmay's plans, and partly because they have taken Qmay's teachings to heart. Unlike Pine and Chiyoko, they had been recaptured after their escape, and endured years of isolated pain and suffering as Uber Labs' only test subject. Teraoka's desires are to form a world where only themselves, Yuta, and Mikatan are alive, and desires to kill everyone else on earth as revenge for what they have gone through.

It is revealed that the official word was right and VR-1 was never going to hit Earth. However, by manipulating the superhuman hacking skills of Meika, Teraoka and their followers have hacked into the servers of the Air Force Space Command and are going to utilise the explosions of nuclear missiles in space to send VR-1 on course to hit Earth.

By December 31, all the Korai House residents have become aware of most of the events that have occurred. They form the fated team "Justice Punch", and launch "Operation Peacemaker". Meika attempts to hack into government servers worldwide to launch ICBMs and SLBMs at VR-1 at just the right time, in an attempt to obliterate it before its impact. Meanwhile, everyone else holds off the onslaught of the authorities and the Qmay Group who are attempting to stop her. Although they succeed at obliterating VR-1, Mikatan uberfies and begins to die; her years of uberfying while fighting crime as Strange Juice has strained her body to its limits. To save Mikatan, Yuta and Teraoka willingly swap their spirits back to their original bodies, thus causing Teraoka to die as "Mikatan" back in their original Guriko form.

Several months later, the discarded spirit of Yuta from the current iteration of the loop informs the gang that he is going to go back in time to Rabura's childhood to possess her to write down the plans for the future, and send them to Dr. Tenga. He will then go back to December 21, possess his own body, and continue the loop. Into the "happy and peaceful future", Mikatan and Yuta--now back in their respective Chiyoko and Pine bodies--continue to fight crime as Strange Juice and Kenji. Meanwhile, Ito informs Meika and Rabura that she is now looking after a pet cat called Chiranosuke. In a post-game epilogue scene, the spirit of Chiranosuke is seen leaving Yuta's sister Akina, who Chiranosuke had been possessing to help guide Yuta onto the right track.

== Gameplay ==
Punch Line is a visual novel adventure game in which the player takes the role of the ghost Yuta Iridatsu, who aims to return to his body. The game is structured like an interactive anime, with its chapters being called "Episodes", and each chapter including a cold open that leads in to opening titles, and closing credits.

The player haunts Yuta's house, solving puzzles while exploring their housemates' rooms. The player can set up pranks in the rooms during interactive "trick sections", which if successful advance the story and give the player access to new poltergeist abilities, such as possession and moving objects. The goal of standard trick sections is to gather "soul fragments" to level up your rank and spiritual powers, by scaring the residents.

"Trick chain" sections involves the player having a goal they need to reach, such as getting a character to a specific location, by using the knowledge they have of the residents circumstances to set up a string of pranks and tricks that will cause a chain reaction resulting in this goal occurring. They initiate their chain of tricks via a specific initiation trick. Initiation tricks are indicated via "Go!" next to them. The player then watches events play out. For example, in the tutorial trick chain the player is tasked with making Mikatan go to Meika's room. Meika has an exorcism job lined up for Rabura who she thinks is out. Meanwhile, Mikatan owes Meika rent money but has forgotten about it. The player topples Rabura's bottle of purifying salt, and moves a note about Mikatan's rent to be easily visible. They then initiate the events by turning off the noisy power tool Meika is using so that she can hear Rabura's voice through her apartment wall and know she is in. She goes and tells her about her job, Rabura visits Mikatan to replace the salt that was spilled, prompting her to find the note about Mikatan's rent, and causing Mikatan to hurry to Meika's room.

If the player fails at prompting their goal during Trick chain sections Yuta is sent back in time and the player attempts it again until they get it right.

During trick section, the player's primary obstacle is the exposed panties of female residents. If panty shots are on screen, Yuta's perverse instincts kick in and the camera moves towards them on their own. While this happens, the "boom!" gauge will begin to fill and the word "caution" flashes across the screen. The player must fight against Yuta's instincts by forcibly moving the camera away and rapidly hitting the escape button. If they fail, they prompt a resulting apocalyptic game over. Certain tricks will greatly expose a woman's panties but also give off a large amount of soul fragments. These are considered "high risk, high reward" tricks.

== Development and release ==
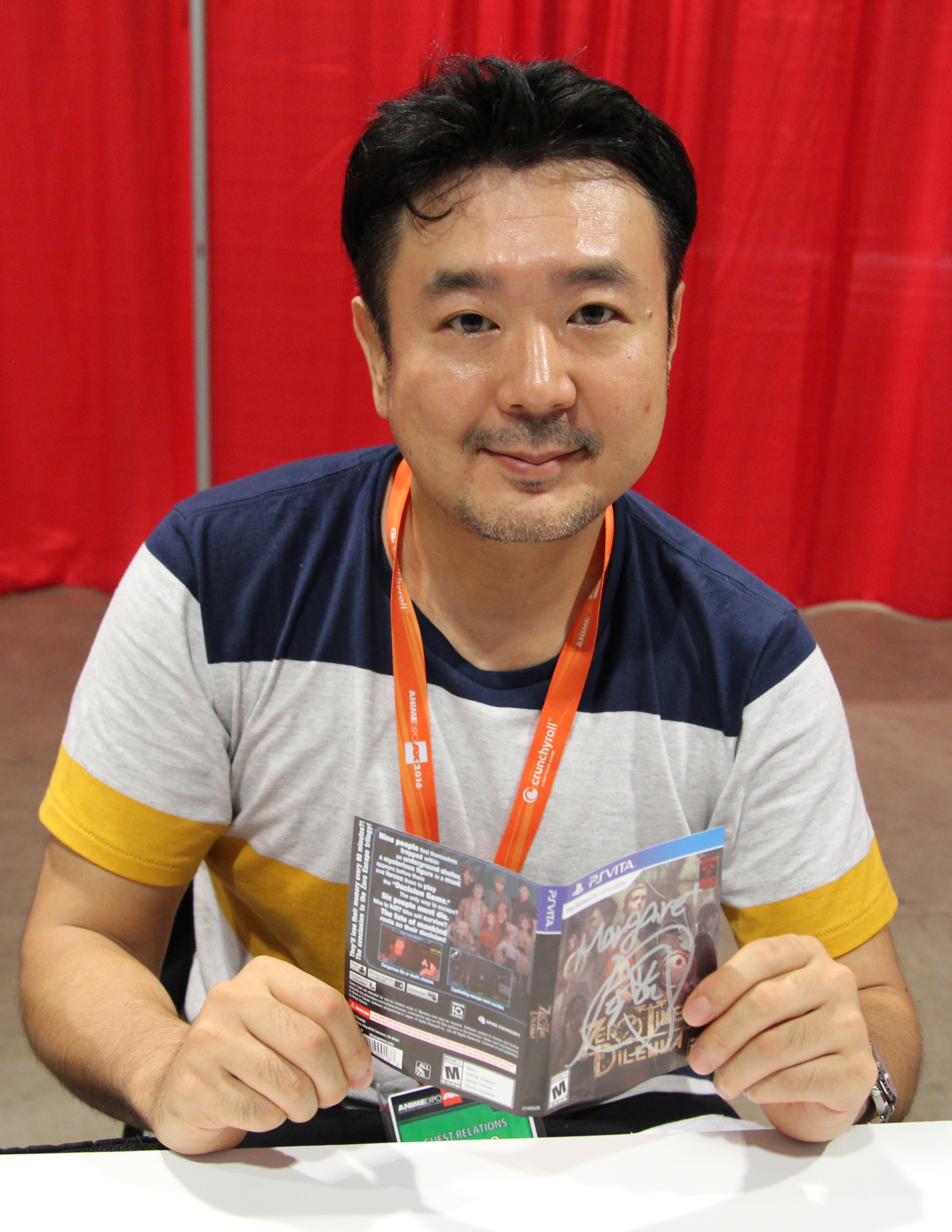
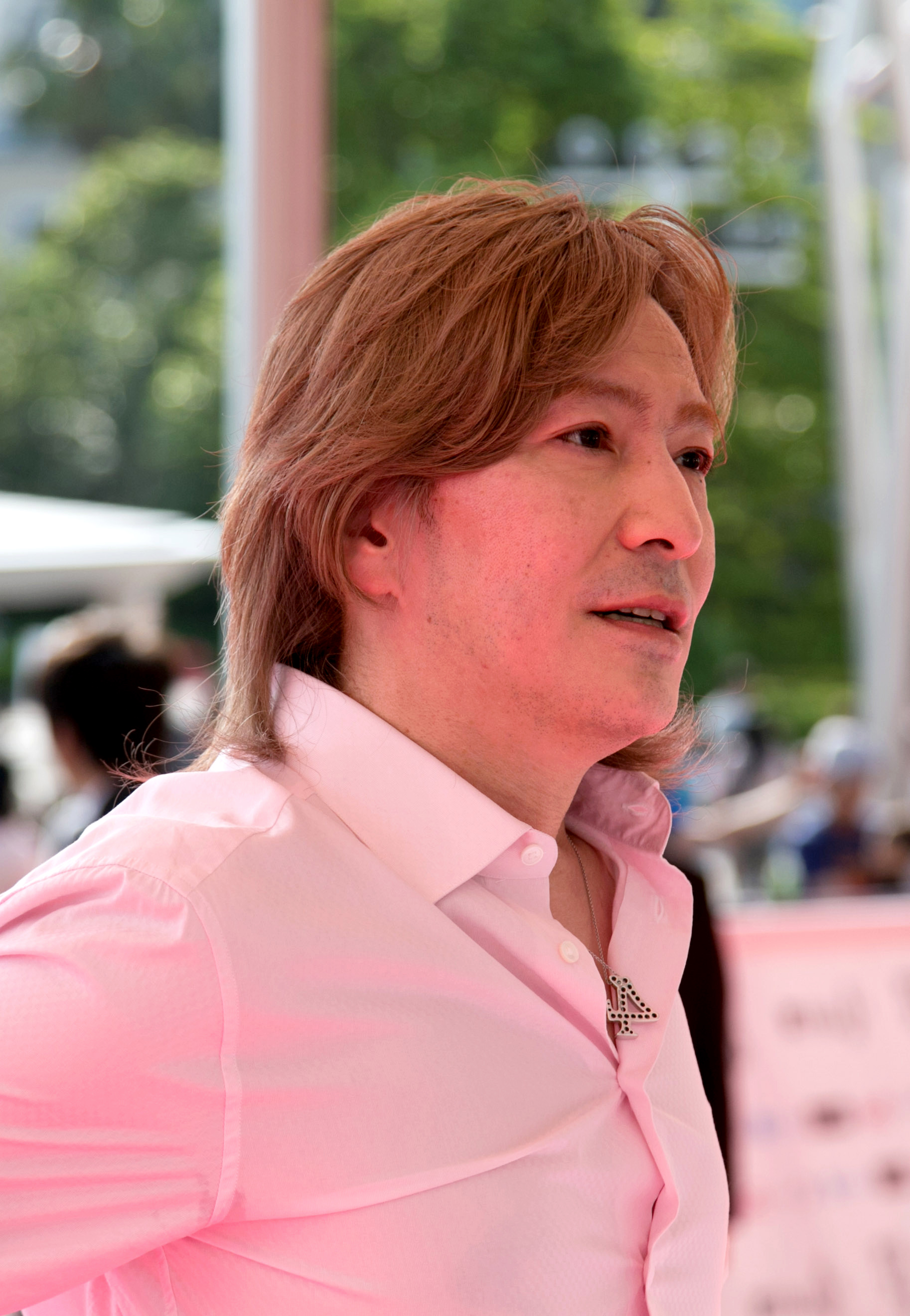
The game was written by Kotaro Uchikoshi (left) and scored by Tetsuya Komuro (right).

Punch Line was developed by 5pb., based on the anime television series of the same name, and was directed by Takumi Nakazawa and produced by Kazuhiro Ichikawa. Kotaro Uchikoshi wrote the scenario, Tetsuya Komuro composed the music, and Shōta Iwasaki designed the characters, all three reprising their roles from the Punch Line anime; the voice cast from the anime also reprised their roles for the game. The production of the 3D graphics was outsourced to the graphics studio Flight Unit. The game's opening theme, "Justice Punch, Here We Go!", was performed by Mikatan's voice actor Sora Amamiya, while the ending theme, "Bad End", was performed by the idol group Iketeru Hearts.

The story includes new material not featured in the original anime, including new mysteries and alternative endings; according to Uchikoshi, the new material approximately corresponds to ten episodes' worth of story on top of the twelve episodes of the anime.

The game was announced in June 2015, with a planned release later that year; it was eventually released for the PlayStation 4 and PlayStation Vita by 5pb. in Japan on April 28, 2016, and is planned to be released for PlayStation 4, PlayStation Vita and Microsoft Windows by PQube in Europe on August 31, 2018, and in North America on October 9. The Japanese limited edition of the game includes a Punch Line audio drama written by Uchikoshi, while the Western "Cheermancy Edition" includes an artbook, a soundtrack album, a cat collar like the character Chiranosuke's, and a rubber pigeon mask.

== Reception ==
Reception

Aggregate score
Aggregator	Score
Metacritic	PS4: 66/100

Review score
Publication	Score
Famitsu	32/40

Famitsu liked the uniqueness of the game's setting and premise, and found it fun to set up pranks and watch them play out.

The game got "mixed or average" critical reception from Western critics, according to Metacritic.

Most criticism was levelled at the game's more perverse elements, while most of the praise was given to game having a story, characters, and charm that extended beyond these aspects. Reviewers noted that many players will be put off by the game's more "offensive" material, a criticism that was also given to the anime it was adapted from. The gameplay was also criticised as being overly simplistic, too easy, too repetitive, and too "paint by numbers".

CGMagazine was especially scathing towards the game, stating that the game "fails to engage the player in any way".
