= Punch Line =

Japanese anime television series

- Key visual

パンチライン
- Genre: Adventure, comedy, supernatural
- Created by: Mages; Fuji Television
- Anime television series
- Directed by: Yutaka Uemura
- Written by: Kotaro Uchikoshi
- Music by: Tetsuya Komuro
- Studio: MAPPA
- Licensed by: Crunchyroll (streaming); NA: Sentai Filmworks; UK: Animatsu Entertainment
- Original network: Fuji TV, Kansai TV (Noitamina)
- Original run: April 10, 2015 – June 26, 2015
- Episodes: 12
- Manga

Punch Line Max
- Written by: Kotaro Uchikoshi
- Illustrated by: Ginichi
- Published by: Kadokawa Corporation
- Magazine: Dengeki G's Comic
- Original run: September 30, 2015 – December 29, 2016
- Volumes: 2
- Other media
- Punch Line (video game)

Punch Line (Japanese: パンチライン, Hepburn: Panchi Rain) is a Japanese anime television series directed by Yutaka Uemura and produced by MAPPA with scripts by Kotaro Uchikoshi, music by Tetsuya Komuro, and character designs by Shōta Iwasaki. The series aired on Fuji TV's Noitamina block between April 10, 2015, and June 26, 2015, and was simulcast by Crunchyroll. (Note: Fuji TV listed its premiere on April 9, 2015, at 24:55, which is effectively April 10 at midnight) The series is licensed in North America by Sentai Filmworks.

A video game adaptation developed by 5pb. was released on PlayStation 4 and PlayStation Vita in 2016 in Japan, and was released in May 2019 in North America and Europe. A manga, titled Punch Line Max, taking place after the anime series, was published by Kadokawa Corporation in Dengeki G's Comic from September 30, 2015, to December 29, 2016, and compiled in two volumes. It was illustrated by Ginichi, and based on an original idea by Uchikoshi.

The title "Punch Line" is primarily intended as an oblique reference to the "punch line" of what happens if protagonist Yuta sees too many panties: humanity dies. As well as this, the title is read in Japanese akin to "panty line" and "panchira", which ties into the series' central focus on panties. The title was also picked to reference the anime's more comical and off-the-wall nature, compared to Uchikoshi's prior work.

== Plot ==
Yūta Iridatsu lives at the Korai House apartment complex with four girls: Mikatan Narugino, Ito Hikiotani, Meika Daihatsu, and Lovera Chichibu. One day, following a busjacking incident, Yūta finds himself ejected from his own body and becoming a spirit. Guided by the cat spirit Chiranosuke, Yūta must learn to master his spirit powers in order to protect his housemates from the various circumstances they find themselves in. However, if Yūta sees a girl's panties twice in a row within a short amount of time, Earth will be destroyed by a meteor.

== Characters ==
Yūta Iridatsu (伊里達 遊太, Iridatsu Yūta)
Voiced by: Marina Inoue
The main protagonist. Yūta's soul was separated from his body following the bus hijacking incident. Yūta must search for Sacred Tome of Koraikan in order to return to his physical body. Whenever he sees a girl's panties, he gains a burst of strength known as Über-fy powers, but upon seeing panties twice in succession, Yūta gains too much stimulation and loses consciousness, which somehow results in a meteor destroying Earth, though he can go back in time to prevent that. He has a small amount of spiritual abilities, which increases upon 'levelling up', but can also perform more advanced abilities, such as possession, when there is cinnamon in the vicinity. In episode 7, it is revealed that Yūta was originally a boy named Pine (パイン, Pain) who ended up switching bodies with a girl named Chiyoko. As such, Yūta is biologically female, with his legal name being Yū Iridatsu (伊里達 遊, Iridatsu Yū). "Yūta Iridatsu" is a pun on the phrase "astral projection" (幽体離脱, yūtai ridatsu).
Mikatan Narugino (成木野 みかたん, Narugino Mikatan)
Voiced by: Sora Amamiya
A member of the idol group "Seas May", who secretly fights crime as the magical girl Strange Juice. Whenever she is flustered or alone, she ends up speaking in the Tsugaru dialect which she picked up in her early childhood. Similar to Yūta, she possesses Uber-fy powers for her crimefighting, but these have a strong side-effect on her body which requires constant medication. It is later revealed that she is Chiyoko (ちよ子), whose soul went out of the body Yūta possesses and into the body of Guriko. When the characters in her name are read differently, her name is a pun on the phrase "ally of justice" (正義の味方, seigi no mikata).
Ito Hikiotani (曳尾谷 愛, Hikiotani Ito)
Voiced by: Minako Kotobuki
A NEET who spends most of her time playing online games and taking care of her pet Muhi, a bear cub. Her name is a pun on the term "HikiOtaNEET" (ヒキオタニート), a portmanteau of hikikomori, otaku, and NEET.
Meika Daihatsu (台初 明香, Daihatsu Meika)
Voiced by: Rie Kugimiya
A robot who happens to be the landlady of the apartment all the characters are living in. She is also a genius inventor, and has unrivalled hacking skills. However, she has very poor physical reflexes. She speaks in the Kansai dialect. Her name is a pun on the phrase "great inventor" (大発明家, Daihatsumei-ka). It also sounds akin to the English word "maker". She is Pumpkin Chair.
Rabura Chichibu (秩父 ラブラ, Chichibu Rabura)
Voiced by: Haruka Tomatsu
A 30-year-old who works as an exorcist. Despite her profession, she does not believe in the existence of spirits. She has never had a boyfriend and is rumoured to still be a virgin. She can be temporarily possessed by Yūta when there is cinnamon in the vicinity. Her name is a pun on "chichi burabura " (乳ブラブラ; lit. 'breasts dangling'). She embodies elements of a gyaru.
Chiranosuke (チラ之助, Chiranosuke)
Voiced by: Yu-ri Yoshida
A talking cat spirit who informs Yūta about spirit powers and serves as a guide to get him to save the world. In episode 12, it is revealed that Chiranosuke is a cat that Ito Hikiotani's friend from technical school gave to her. He/she is a chinchilla, which is a type of Persian Cat.
Ryūto Teraoka (寺岡 龍都, Teraoka Ryūto)
Voiced by: Kenji Akabane
The leader of the QMay terrorist organisation. He is later revealed to be Guriko (ぐり子), whose soul currently possesses Yūta's original body.
Chihaya Tomoda (友田 千早, Tomoda Chihaya)
Voiced by: Jun Oosuka
Ito's homeroom teacher, who has a deranged admiration for Ito. Merging with Q-May's spirit, Tomoda becomes a masked soldier, referred to the residents as "Turtle Man" (亀男, Kame Otoko), and is able to use Über-fy powers.
Kenji Miyazawa (宮沢 賢治, Miyazawa Kenji)
Voiced by: Marina Inoue
A costumed vigilante who shows up out of nowhere and possesses the same Uber-fy powers as Yūta. It is later revealed that this is another version of Yūta, who goes back in time from a previous time loop and possesses his present day body whenever the plan to save the world fails, eventually becoming an identity the present Yūta assumes when he goes back in time.
Akina Iridatsu (伊里達 秋奈, Iridatsu Akina)
Voiced by: Mariko Honda
Yūta's foster sister, who found him after he had switched into Chiyoko's body. She is the one who sends Yūta the Kenji Miyazawa costume.

== Media ==
=== Anime ===
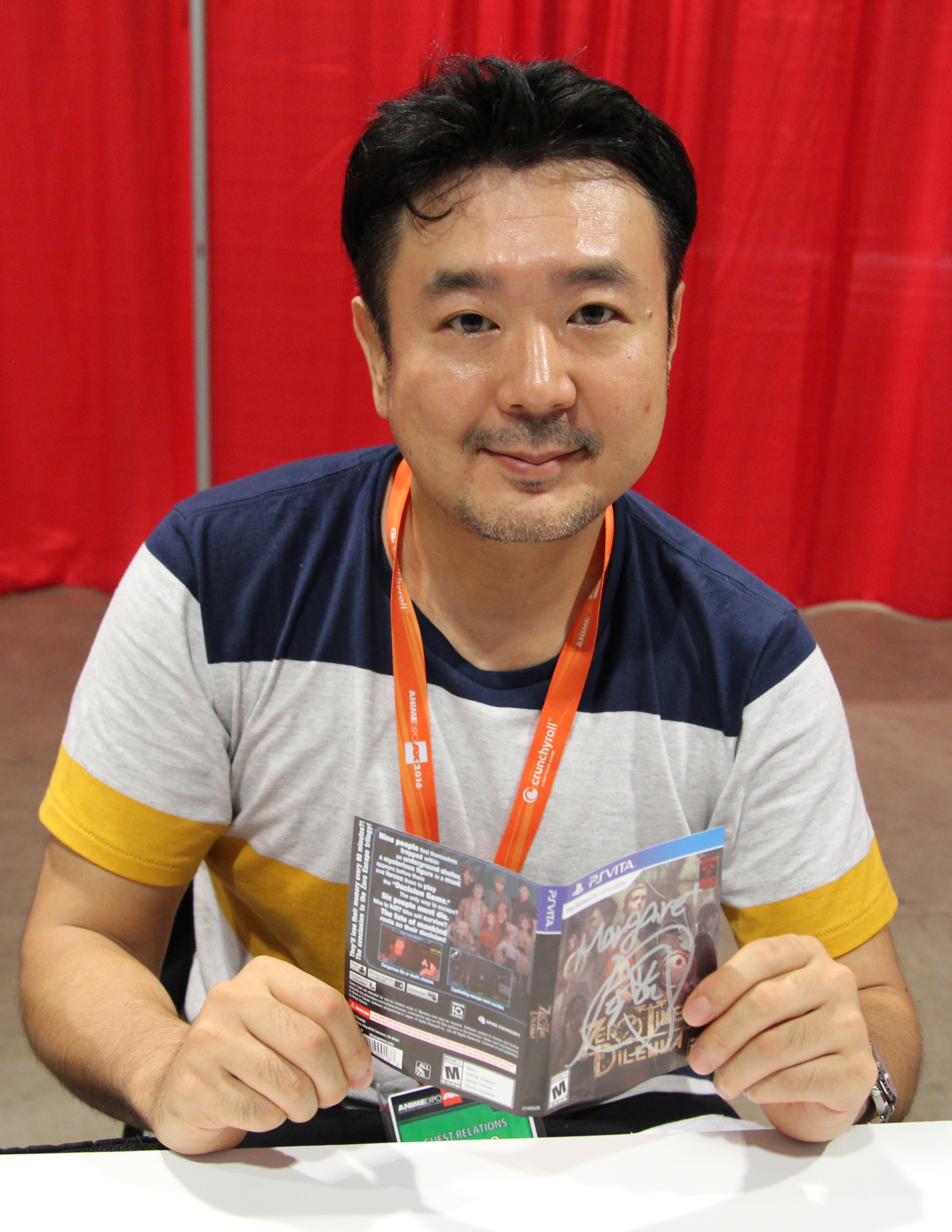
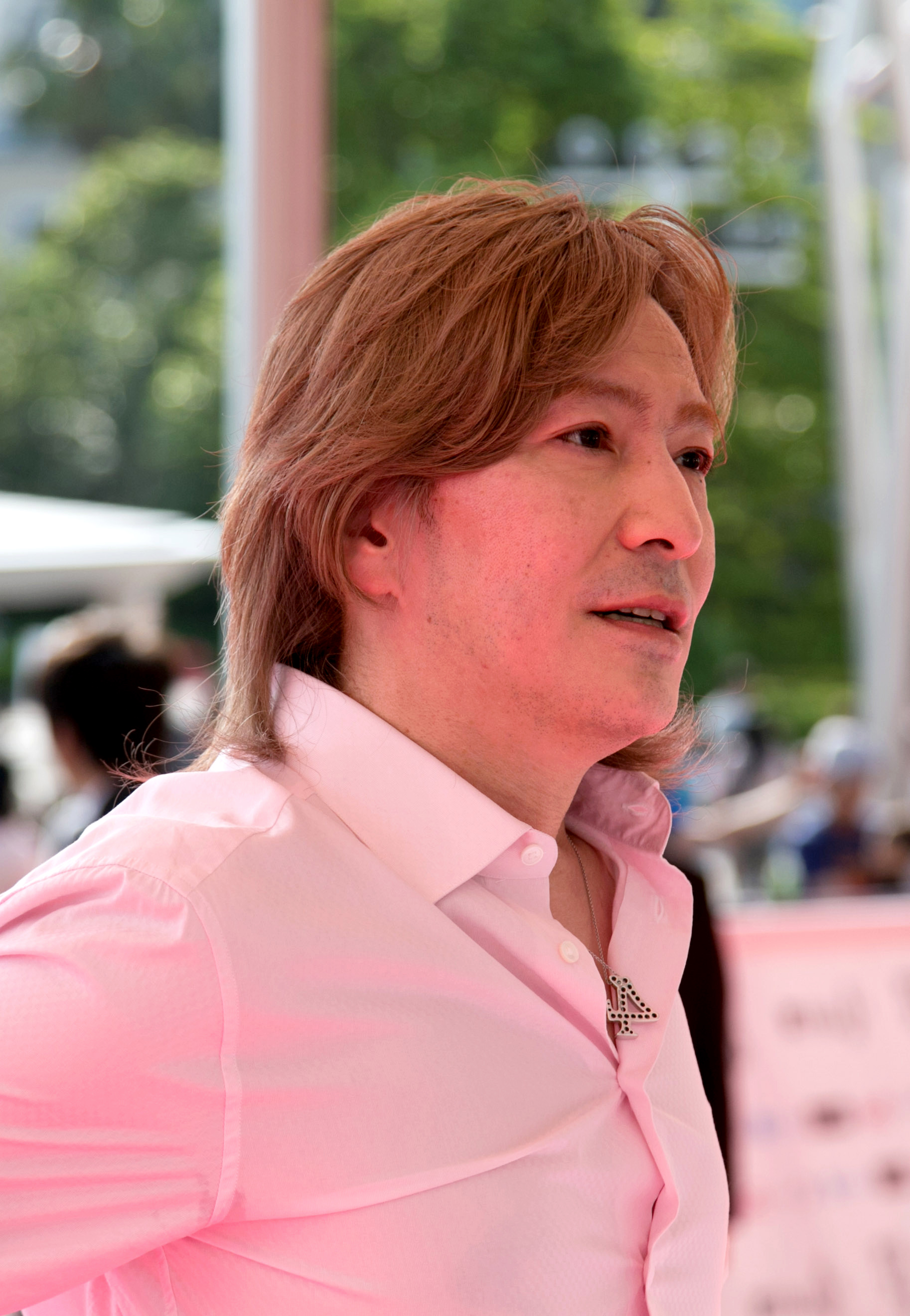
The series was written by Kotaro Uchikoshi (left) and scored by Tetsuya Komuro (right).

Punch Line was first announced on November 24, 2014. The series is directed by Yutaka Uemura at MAPPA and written by Kotaro Uchikoshi with character design by Shōta Iwasaki and music composed by Tetsuya Komuro. The series aired on Fuji TV's Noitamina programming block between April 10, 2015, and June 26, 2015, and was simulcast by Crunchyroll. The opening theme is "Punch Line!" by Shokotan and Denpagumi while the ending theme is "Honey Honey Honey" (蜜蜜蜜) by AyumiKurikaMaki. The series is licensed in North America by Sentai Filmworks.

The story was originally conceived under the plot idea of "a ghost who cannot see panties to avoid killing humanity". Uchikoshi explains, "Humanity dies" is like the satirical answer a girl might give you if you asked what'd happen if a boy saw their panties. The concept for the story [of Punch Line] essentially started out as a means to set up that whole joke." This central theme was inspired, and centered around, the anime trope of sexual arousal being expressed by nosebleeds: "Nosebleeds in anime is used to comically indicate that blood is rushing to the head, that you're so excited it's hurting you. In Punch Line the joke is that this is taken to the extreme, as the protagonist's excitement doesn't just cause a nosebleed, it causes the apocalypse". While writing the story, Uchikoshi incorporated elements familiar to him in his prior works, particularly Zero Escape. Uchikoshi wanted the title of the series to reference both its comical nature, and the central meaning behind its conception. Uchikoshi and Uemura eventually settled on the name "Punch Line", due its similarity to the term "panchira".

=== Video game ===
A Punch Line video game was developed and published by 5pb. for the PlayStation 4 and PlayStation Vita in 2016 in Japan, and was published by PQube in 2018 in North America and Europe. The game plays as a visual novel adventure game and expands on the story of the anime, adding new alternative endings. Uchikoshi and Komuro reprised their roles from the anime as writer and composer, respectively, along with the series' voice cast.
