= Klimavičius =

- Lithuanian surname
- m.: Klimavičius
- f.: (unmarried): Klimavičiūtė
- f.: (married): Klimavičienė
- Origin: Klim
- Related names: Klimovich

Klimavičius is the masculine form of a Lithuanian family name. Its feminine forms in Lithuanian are: Klimavičienė (married woman or widow) and Klimavičiūtė (unmarried woman). It is the Lithuanized form of the East Slavic surname Klimovich.

The surname may refer to:

- Arūnas Klimavičius - football player
- Tadas Klimavičius - basketball player
