= Klim =

Klim may refer to:

- Klim (surname), a list of people and fictional characters
- Klim (given name), a list of people and fictional characters
- Klim (TV series), a Russian TV show
- Klim (powdered milk), a powdered milk product
- Klim (clothing), a clothing company
- Klim, Denmark, a village
- Klim Type Foundry
- KCRN (AM), a radio station licensed to Limon, Colorado, United States, which held the call sign KLIM from 1984 to 2018

== See also ==
- Niels Klim's Underground Travels, a satirical science-fiction/fantasy novel written by the Norwegian–Danish author Ludvig Holberg.
