= Klimovich =

Klimovich (Belarusian: Клімовіч, Russian: Климович, Ukrainian: Климович) is an East Slavic language surname. Polish language equivalent: Klimowicz, Lithuanian language equivalent: Klimavičius.

Notable people with the surname include:

- Andrey Klimovich (born 1988), Belarusian football goalkeeper
- Dmitri Klimovich (footballer born 1972) (born 1972), Belarusian football defender
- Dzmitry Klimovich (born 1984), Belarusian football defender
- Lyutsian Klimovich (1907–1989), Soviet orientalist and Islamic scholar
- Sergei Klimovich (born 1974), retired Russian professional ice hockey center

== See also ==
- Klimkovich
