= Zero Escape: Virtue's Last Reward =

2012 Japanese visual novel

- North American cover art
- Developer: Chunsoft
- Publishers: JP: Chunsoft; NA: Aksys Games (Note: Also published The Nonary Games in Europe.); EU: Rising Star Games; WW: Spike Chunsoft (Note: Published The Nonary Games on all platforms in Japan, and on Xbox One and Windows worldwide.)
- Director: Kotaro Uchikoshi
- Designers: Akihiro Kaneko; Susumu Kotegawa
- Programmer: Yasushi Takashina
- Artist: Kinu Nishimura
- Writer: Kotaro Uchikoshi
- Composer: Shinji Hosoe
- Series: Zero Escape
- Platforms: Nintendo 3DS; PlayStation Vita; Microsoft Windows; PlayStation 4; Xbox One
- Release: February 16, 2012: Nintendo 3DS, PS Vita; JP: February 16, 2012; NA: October 23, 2012; EU: November 23, 2012 Microsoft Windows; NA/EU: March 24, 2017; JP: March 25, 2017 PlayStation 4; NA/EU: March 24, 2017; JP: April 13, 2017 Xbox One; WW: March 22, 2022
- Genres: Adventure, visual novel, escape the room
- Mode: Single-player

Zero Escape: Virtue's Last Reward (Note: The game was titled Virtue's Last Reward in Europe, and Kyokugen Dasshutsu ADV: Zennin Shibō Desu (極限脱出ADV 善人シボウデス) in Japan. The Japanese title has two meanings: "Extreme Escape ADV: Good People Die" and "Extreme Escape ADV: Want to be a Good Person".) is a 2012 adventure game developed by Chunsoft. It is the second installment in the Zero Escape series, and was originally released for the Nintendo 3DS and PlayStation Vita. The story follows the player character Sigma, who is abducted and forced along with eight other individuals to play the Nonary Game, which puts its participants in a life-or-death situation. As the story progresses, the characters unravel the secrets behind the Nonary Game.

The gameplay alternates between two types of sections: Escape sections, where the player completes puzzles in escape-the-room scenarios; and Novel sections, where the player reads the game's narrative through visual novel segments, and makes decisions that influence the story toward one of twenty-four different endings. The player is given access to a flowchart, which allows them to revisit any previously completed section, and choose a different option to cause the story to proceed in another direction.

The game was developed as a result of the unexpected critical success that its predecessor, Nine Hours, Nine Persons, Nine Doors, received in North America. Game director Kotaro Uchikoshi wrote the script, which was then localized by Aksys Games and Rising Star Games for North America and Europe respectively. Virtue's Last Reward was released to positive reviews. Critics praised the story and characters but were divided in their opinions of the Escape sections. The game was a commercial failure in Japan, which led to the temporary cancellation of its sequel. Development on the sequel eventually resumed, and Zero Time Dilemma was released in 2016. In March 2017, Virtue's Last Reward was bundled with an enhanced port of its predecessor and released together as Zero Escape: The Nonary Games for PlayStation 4, PlayStation Vita and Microsoft Windows.

== Gameplay ==
The Escape sections are shown from a first-person perspective, with the player able to move between pre-set positions.

The gameplay of Virtue's Last Reward is divided into two types of sections: Novel and Escape. In Novel sections, the player advances through the storyline and converses with non-playable characters through visual novel segments. These sections require little interaction from the player other than reading the dialogue and text that appear on the screen. During Novel sections, the player may be presented with decision options that affect the course of the game. One recurring decision option is a prisoner's dilemma-type choice where the player must choose to "ally" or "betray" the characters they are pitted against, with different results depending on what choices the two parties make.

In between Novel sections are Escape sections, which occur when the player arrives in a room from which they need to find a means of escape. These are presented from a first-person perspective, with the player able to move between predetermined positions in each room. To escape, the player is tasked with finding various items and solving puzzles, reminiscent of escape-the-room games. At some points, the player may need to combine objects to create the necessary tool to complete a puzzle. The puzzles include various brain teasers, such as Lights Out and sliding puzzles. In each Escape room, a safe can be found, which can be opened with two passwords. One of these passwords gives the player the key needed to escape from the room, while the other grants access to a hidden folder that provides the player with supplementary backstory or other information. The player receives hints to the puzzle solutions from the game's characters; further, more direct, hints are received if the player changes the puzzle's difficulty level from "hard" to "easy".

The player has access to a flowchart that allows them to revisit or "jump" to any previously completed Novel or Escape section without replaying the game from the beginning. This allows the player to transition to an earlier branching point in the story and choose a different option that causes the story to progress in another direction. For example, the player can jump to a previous decision and ally with their opponent instead of betraying them, and vice versa. While there are 24 endings available, many endings are inaccessible initially and must be unlocked by experiencing events or learning information in other plotlines. For example, if a particular plotline cannot progress because a required password is unknown, the player must jump to another plotline and learn the password there before returning to the original one.

== Plot ==
=== Characters and setting ===
Virtue's Last Reward features nine main characters who are kidnapped by an unknown individual called Zero. The player character Sigma (Kosuke Toriumi/Troy Baker) is joined by Phi (Chiaki Omagawa/Karen Strassman), a girl with a "no-nonsense attitude"; Dio (Yoshimasa Hosoya/Liam O'Brien), a rude and insensitive man; Tenmyouji (Rokuro Naya/Dave B. Mitchell), an elderly man; Quark (Rie Kugimiya/Erin Fitzgerald), an energetic young boy; Luna (Mamiko Noto/Laura Bailey), a kind and quiet woman; Clover (Yukari Tamura/Wendee Lee), an unpredictable girl who appeared in Nine Hours, Nine Persons, Nine Doors; Alice (Atsuko Tanaka/Tara Platt), a commanding and focused woman of half-Egyptian/half-American heritage; and K (Daisuke Ono/Travis Willingham), an amnesiac man who wears an irremovable, full-body suit of armor. Zero III (TARAKO/Cindy Robinson), an artificial intelligence who appears in the form of a CGI rabbit, controls the Nonary Game. Zero III is nicknamed "Zero Jr." by the participants to distinguish the entity from the human Zero, who is in turn nicknamed "Zero Sr."

The game is set in an abandoned warehouse-like facility containing rooms filled with puzzles, where Zero forces the characters to participate in the Nonary Game. The characters are affixed with bracelets that display a point value that is initially set at three. During the game they participate in rounds of the Ambidex Game, in which they have to choose to "ally" or "betray" the other characters. The choices made affect the players' bracelet points: if two opponents both choose "ally", each gains two points; if the two opponents both choose "betray", no change occurs; and if one opponent chooses "betray" while the other chooses "ally", the opponent who chose "betray" gains three points while the other opponent loses two points. Participants who gain at least nine points can escape, while those who reach zero points are executed.

=== Story ===
In 2028, Sigma is abducted and placed inside an elevator with Phi. Zero III appears on a monitor and informs them that they are participants in the Nonary Game and that they must escape the elevator before it falls. Upon escaping, they find themselves in a warehouse-like facility with Dio, Quark, Tenmyouji, Luna, Alice, K, and Clover. Zero III informs the group that nine individual bracelet points are necessary to escape the facility, and points can only be earned by participating in the Ambidex Game.

The story begins branching into different timelines that can be experienced in any order, depending on the choices made by the player. While completing the first set of puzzle rooms, the participants learn of a pandemic caused by Radical-6, a virus that slows down its victims' cognition and drives them to suicide. Depending on the given timeline, the characters also discover either the murdered body of an old woman or antimatter bombs. The other participants' backstories are explored: Luna is a humanoid robot, tasked with maintaining the Nonary Game; K was raised by Zero Sr. inside of the facility; Tenmyouji willingly joined the game, together with his adopted grandson Quark, after being promised a chance to find a certain woman; Alice and Clover are government secret agents tasked with stopping the religious cult Free the Soul; and Dio is a member of Free the Soul.

In a Schrödinger's cat-like situation, prior to the start of the Nonary Game, Dio either murdered the old woman and took her place in the game, or failed to do so but was still placed into the game by her and later planted the bombs. In the timeline leading to the game's ultimate ending, Sigma defuses the bombs, while Dio is restrained and incapacitated. The remaining participants proceed to the next set of puzzle rooms. As Sigma, Phi, and Tenmyouji complete their room, they uncover a holographic message of the old woman, Akane Kurashiki, whom Tenmyouji – revealed to be the player character Junpei from Nine Hours, Nine Persons, Nine Doors – was seeking. Akane and Zero Sr. had developed the AB project, a project that encompassed the Nonary Game and the Ambidex Game, to train Sigma and Phi to transport their consciousnesses through time. This occurs shortly thereafter, and Phi subdues Dio before he can kill Akane. Akane explains that the game's dangerous elements were necessary to speed up one's brain to transport one's consciousness through time, and each participant was infected with Radical-6 to amplify this increase. The Nonary Game was designed so Sigma and Phi could experience multiple timelines and retain what they learn in each one. Sigma and Phi's consciousnesses are then returned to the present, where they find everyone has cooperated to acquire enough points to escape.

The group leaves the facility and emerges on the Moon's surface. The year is 2074 and most of humanity was killed by Radical-6 after it was unleashed by Free the Soul from a Mars mission test site in 2028. They re-enter the facility and discover a cold sleep pod. K explains that each person was brought to the facility to recreate the events that Zero Sr. and Akane had previously experienced. Clover, Alice, and Phi were abducted in 2028 and placed in cold sleep until the Nonary Game began. The pod opens to reveal a clone of Sigma, and K reveals he is actually Akane in disguise; in the timelines where Akane was killed, the armor was instead occupied by Sigma's clone, Kyle.

Akane explains that Sigma, after his abduction in 2028, had his consciousness transported into his elder self's body in 2074, while his elder self's consciousness was transported into the younger Sigma's body in 2028. The goal of the AB project was to enable the elder Sigma to prevent the Radical-6 outbreak in 2028 with his future knowledge; Dio sought to stop the project. Akane makes Phi and Sigma's consciousnesses jump to 2029, after the outbreak. Sigma, as Zero Sr., spends the next 45 years developing the AB project together with Akane, while Phi is kept in cold sleep. Sigma creates Kyle as a spare, in case his own body gets damaged. Immediately before the start of the Nonary Game in 2074, Sigma and Phi jump back to 2028 to infiltrate the Mars mission test site.

Another Time

A bonus, non-canonical metafictional ending unlocked by the player finding every available file in the game.

Kyle speaks to the participants who are left behind in the facility. Tenmyouji and Quark plan to go back to Earth, while Alice and Clover plan to remain in the facility having nothing to return to on Earth. They all express disdain for their current circumstances that Sigma forced them into. Kyle eventually realises through conversation with Phi and Akane he is not actually Kyle, but rather an all-knowing, omnipotent entity who is unbound by the limitations of their world (the player of Virtue's Last Reward). The entity swapped their consciousness with Kyle, sending Kyle's consciousness into their body in 2028, to be with Sigma and Phi. Akane tells the entity that they are going to now go back to the past and join Sigma and Phi at the Mars Mission Test Site.

== Development ==
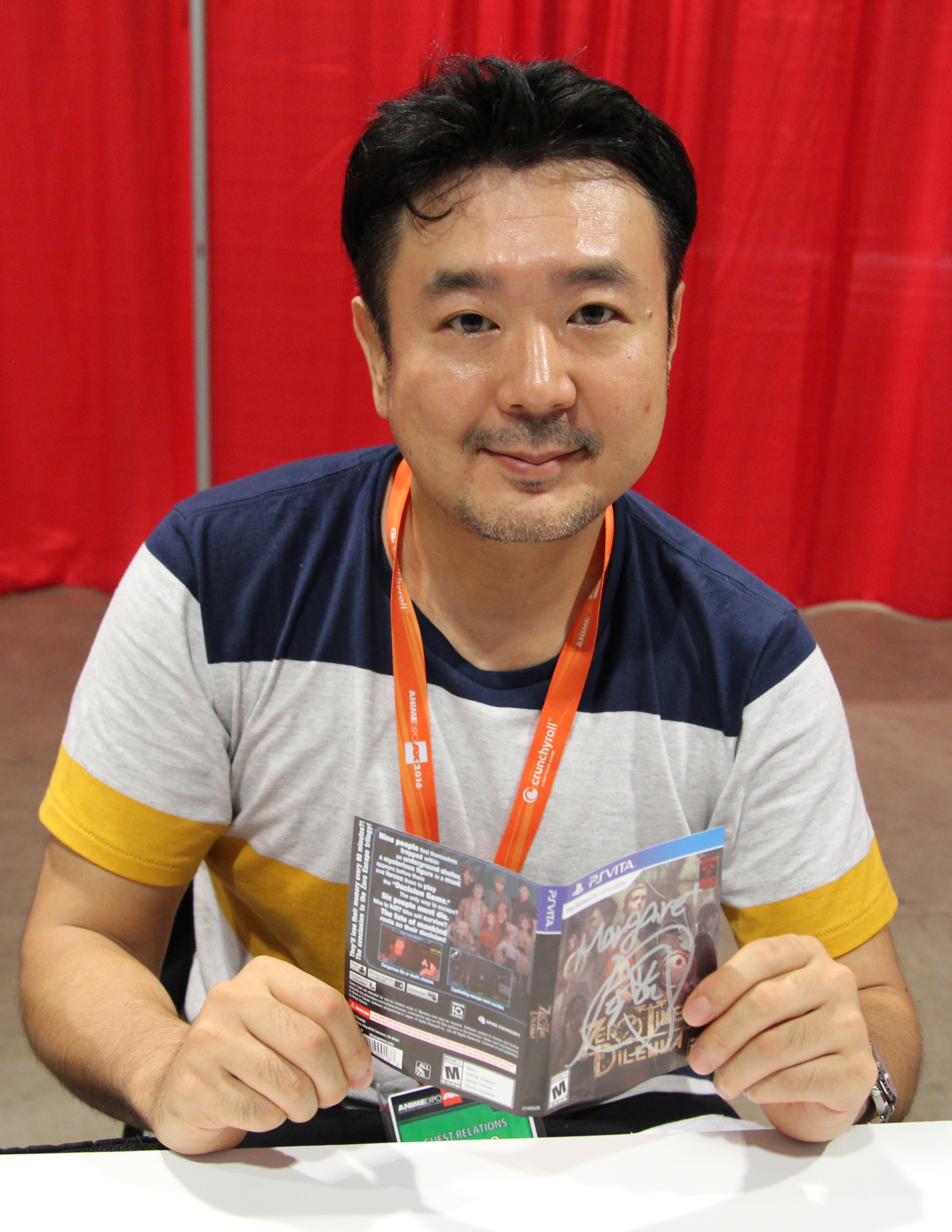
The game was directed by Kotaro Uchikoshi, who had led the production of Nine Hours, Nine Persons, Nine Doors.

Virtue's Last Reward was developed by Chunsoft and directed by Kotaro Uchikoshi, who had previously led the production of Nine Hours, Nine Persons, Nine Doors. While his original intention was to make Nine Hours, Nine Persons, Nine Doors a stand-alone title, its unexpected critical success in North America prompted him to continue the series. In an attempt to reduce costs, Uchikoshi asked Chunsoft if he could develop Virtue's Last Reward and its eventual sequel simultaneously, as both games would use the same engine and digital assets; Chunsoft agreed to his proposal, and green-lit production.

Development of Virtue's Last Reward began on the Nintendo DS, but this changed early in production following the announcement of the Nintendo 3DS and PlayStation Vita. The development team at Chunsoft wanted to utilize the three-dimensional (3D) features of the newer systems, and changed production of the game to the Nintendo 3DS and PlayStation Vita. As neither system had been released yet, the team was under the assumption that the 3D features would require 3D character models. Uchikoshi later remarked that designing 3D character models proved to be a challenge for Chunsoft due to company's inexperience with 3D effects.

=== Story and themes ===
Virtue's Last Reward marks a tonal shift from the suspense present within Nine Hours, Nine Persons, Nine Doors, to a more relaxed and exploration-heavy atmosphere. Uchikoshi stated that the results of a Japanese survey indicated that players who did not purchase Nine Hours, Nine Persons, Nine Doors thought it looked scary; he "didn't have a choice but to tone it down" for Virtue's Last Reward.

Uchikoshi began by writing a basic story and worked with a sub-writer, who helped brainstorm ideas and identify problems. The Ambidex Game was intended to have philosophical significance, as the logical decisions made hurts its participants both on a group level and on a personal one. He sought to create a balanced cast of supporting characters, in terms of genders, personalities, and ages represented, and used the Enneagram of Personality as reference. Sigma was not given a strong personality in order for players to more easily empathize with him. Uchikoshi enlivened the supporting characters by making them "mysterious" so that players were curious about their backstories, and deliberately made certain ones appear suspicious to misdirect players from determining who the "real bad guy" is.

Some changes were made to the initial plot of Virtue's Last Reward. During one scene, Dio handcuffs Clover and Tenmyouji to a sink, which prevents them from participating in the Nonary Game (the punishment for not participating is death). Originally, Dio was meant to "do something even more messed up" to Clover, but the president of Chunsoft opposed this scene for "ethical reasons", after which it was changed. While the game ends in the year 2029 with humanity dying out and Sigma aspiring to change the future, Uchikoshi later felt this ending alone was inappropriate following the 2011 Tōhoku earthquake and tsunami. He added an extended, non-canonical meta ending featuring Kyle and an entity that is supposed to represent the player to lighten the mood. Uchikoshi has stated regret over this ending, due to its non-canonical status not being clear, prompting implications to the series narrative that were not intended. Uchikoshi also considered including several scientific and philosophical concepts that eventually were left out. These scrapped ideas included the Monty Hall problem, a brain teaser based on probability; and the Capgras delusion, a mental disorder in which someone believes that a person they know has been replaced with an identical-looking impostor.

=== Localization ===
As with Nine Hours, Nine Persons, Nine Doors, Aksys Games localized Virtue's Last Reward for its North American release. Nobara Nakayama translated the game's text from Japanese to English, which was then localized by editor Ben Bateman. Bateman later stated that overcoming various translation issues was one of the hardest aspects of editing Virtue's Last Reward. Although Uchikoshi had written the game with the English-language audience in mind, which avoided several plot-related translation problems, a few jokes did not translate properly and had to be changed during localization. There were also two characters who "talked like animals" in the Japanese version of the game: Zero III, who added "-usa" to the end of its sentences, which is the first half of usagi (the Japanese word for "rabbit"); and Sigma, who added "-nya" (the Japanese onomatopoeia for the sound cats make) to the end of his sentences whenever he talked about cats. Bateman solved this by writing rabbit and cat themed puns. Another challenge for Bateman was keeping track of the story moments from each branching path. It was important to know whether information regarding each character had been revealed yet to the player in that timeline, as this would ultimately affect the word choice and attitude of each line of dialogue. In the original release of the game, instances in dialogue involving the contraction of "I don't know" were spelled as "donno", rather than the more conventional "dunno", which became something of interest among fans. Bateman has stated that he has always considered "donno" to be normal, as it is made up of "don't" and "know", and never realized that this spelling would be considered unusual, until fans began making a deal about it. This was altered in the Nonary Games version of the game to the more conventional "dunno".

For voice casting, the localization team was sent a list of people who might fit the roles, along with short reels for each actor. Once the actors had been chosen, Bateman wrote the voice direction, which consisted of short blurbs the voice actors saw next to the line they were supposed to say, so they would know how to perform it. While the North American version of the game allows the user to select either Japanese or English audio tracks, the European version, which was released by Rising Star Games, only features the Japanese audio track. The Nonary Games version includes the English and Japanese voice tracks in all regions.

== Release ==
To promote the game, Chunsoft released an original video animation in December 2011. Created by the Japanese animation studio Gonzo, it serves as an introduction to the game, showcasing the characters and the basic Ambidex Game rules. As well as the video animation, a Flash game was produced and made available on the Japanese Virtue's Last Reward website. The gameplay of the Flash game has the player attempt to open a metal door by quickly clicking on it. As the door begins to open, Clover is revealed on the other side, and the player begins clicking on her breasts. Richard Eisenbeis of Kotaku was perplexed by the Flash game: "As it is pretty much the antithesis of everything presented in Virtue's Last Reward, I truly wonder how this Flash game is supposed to convince anyone to play the full title. Perhaps it's just due to a [public relations] department following the old adage: 'sex sells'".

Virtue's Last Reward was released in Japan on February 16, 2012. In its first week of release, the Nintendo 3DS version sold 9,307 copies while the PlayStation Vita version sold 6,538 copies. The game was released in North America on October 23, and in Europe on November 23; this was the first Zero Escape game to be released in Europe. People who pre-ordered the North American version of the game through Amazon.com received a replica of the bracelet that the characters wear; a similar pre-order bonus had been given out for Nine Hours, Nine Persons, Nine Doors. The bracelets could later be purchased through the Aksys Games store, with all proceeds going to the American Red Cross and Hurricane Sandy relief.

Shortly after the game's release in North America, a game-breaking glitch was discovered in the Nintendo 3DS version: saving one's progress during specific Escape sections could corrupt the save file, forcing one to restart the game from the beginning. In response, Aksys Games recommended that players avoid saving during Escape sections. By 2013, Aksys Games stated that the glitch had been patched in the Nintendo eShop version, but some players continued to report that the glitch still existed.

Zero Escape: The Nonary Games, a bundle that contains remastered versions of Nine Hours, Nine Persons, Nine Doors and Virtue's Last Reward, was released for Microsoft Windows, PlayStation 4 and PlayStation Vita in the West on March 24, 2017. People who purchased the Windows version through Steam in its first week of release received a complimentary soundtrack, with songs from Nine Hours, Nine Persons, Nine Doors and Virtue's Last Reward. In Japan, the Microsoft Windows version was released on March 25, while the console versions were released on April 13. The European PlayStation Vita version was released on December 15. The Nonary Games was later released for Xbox One on March 22, 2022, and was added to the Xbox Game Pass service for console, PC and cloud on the same date.

== Reception ==
Reception

Aggregate score
Aggregator	Score
Metacritic	88/100 (3DS); 84/100 (Vita)

Review scores
Publication	Score
1Up.com	A−
Adventure Gamers	3/5
Destructoid	9.5/10
Edge	7/10
Electronic Gaming Monthly	9/10
Eurogamer	7/10
Famitsu	9/10, 8/10, 9/10, 8/10
Game Informer	8.75/10
GameSpot	8.5/10
IGN	9.5/10
Nintendo Life	8/10

Virtue's Last Reward received "generally favorable reviews" on both platforms, according to the review aggregator Metacritic. Several reviewers found the game's narrative to be complex and engaging: GameSpot's Heidi Kemps enjoyed its mix of horror, drama, and science fiction, and Edge called it a "page-turner with flashes of real intelligence"; Edge later noted that it lacked the shock value of Nine Hours, Nine Persons, Nine Doors. Game Informer's Kimberly Wallace and Tony Ponce of Destructoid liked the use of plot twists, but Ponce felt that the ending featured too many of them, and that the revelations were more confusing than surprising. Writing for RPGFan, John McCarroll liked how the dialogue ranged from humorous to saddening and harrowing. Austin Boosinger of Adventure Gamers was critical of the dialogue, however, calling it "one of the slowest and most overwritten adventure games" ever made.

The characters were similarly well received. Bob Mackey of 1UP.com and Martin Robinson of Eurogamer called them believable and easy for the player to care about. IGN's Lucas M. Thomas was satisfied by development of each character, while Mike Manson of Nintendo Life considered each characters' motives to be unique and interesting. In contrast, Boosinger found the characters to be uncompelling and poorly written, and believed that there was little reason to care for them until their backstories were revealed.

Reviewers were divided in their opinions of the Escape sections. Edge and Wallace thought that the Escape sections were satisfying to solve, while Robinson did not find them fun. Boosinger called them dull and uninspired, but appreciated their connections to the game's mathematical and scientific themes. Several reviewers noted that the controls for both the Nintendo 3DS and the PlayStation Vita were awkward and oversensitive, and Molie L. Patterson of Electronic Gaming Monthly found the limited camera movement disappointing as well. Kemps commented that the user interface was improved from Nine Hours, Nine Persons, Nine Doors. Many reviewers praised the flowchart for not forcing the player to replay previously completed sections or restart the game from the beginning, but Boosinger and Edge criticized it for removing the tension of making wrong decisions.

The game's visuals and overall presentation were positively received. Thomas thought that the 3D visuals were "beautifully" rendered, and that they were much better than those of its predecessor. These comments were shared by Patterson, who remarked that while she was initially skeptical of the visuals from gameplay screenshots, her opinion changed after playing the game. McCarroll felt that many of the environments looked similar and that they were often colorless. Manson thought that the character models fit well with the realistic environments, but noted that there was a limited amount of character animations. Critics enjoyed the voice acting, with Thomas calling it "among the best performances I've ever heard in any game, period".

Virtue's Last Reward received some awards from gaming publications, including: Handheld Game of the Year from GameSpot, Best 3DS/DS Story from IGN, Best Handheld Exclusive from Game Informer, and Best Story and Best Graphic Adventure from RPGFan. The game also received nominations for Best Narrative at the 13th Annual Game Developers Choice Awards, and Game of the Year from Kotaku, Pocket Gamer, and GameSpot. Gamasutra, Game Developer, 1UP.com, and Amazon.com placed Virtue's Last Reward within their non-ranked lists of the Best Games of 2012, while RPGFan listed it as one of the thirty essential role-playing video games from the years 2010 to 2015. In 2016, GamesMaster listed Virtue's Last Reward as one of the "100 best games to play right now".
