= Shin Honkaku Mahō Shōjo Risuka =

Japanese light novel series written by Japanese novelist Nisio Isin

- Magical Girl Risuka
- Cover of the first novel, featuring Kizutaka Kugi and Risuka Mizukura

新本格魔法少女りすか (Shin Honkaku Mahō Shōjo Risuka)
- Genre: Magical girl
- Light novel
- Written by: Nisio Isin
- Illustrated by: Kinu Nishimura
- Published by: Kodansha
- English publisher: NA: Del Rey Manga
- Imprint: Kodansha Novels; Kodansha Bunko
- Magazine: Faust; Mephisto
- Original run: October 2003 – August 2020
- Volumes: 4
- Manga
- Written by: Nisio Isin
- Illustrated by: Nao Emoto
- Published by: Kodansha
- Magazine: Bessatsu Shōnen Magazine
- Original run: April 9, 2021 – February 9, 2024
- Volumes: 7

Shin Honkaku Mahō Shōjo Risuka (Japanese: 新本格魔法少女りすか; lit. "New Authentic Magical Girl Risuka"), also known as Magical Girl Risuka (魔法少女りすか, Mahō Shōjo Risuka), is a Japanese light novel series written by Japanese novelist Nisio Isin, and illustrated by Kinu Nishimura. It was published in Faust magazine, running from October 2003 to August 2008, and was serialized into three light novel volumes published by Kodansha from 2004 to 2007, with one chapter unreleased. A short story version was also featured in the English anthology of Faust magazine. A new serialization started in 2019, in Mephisto vol. 3, republishing chapters 1 and 10. In 2020, in Mephisto vol. 1 and vol. 2, chapters 11 and 12 were published, respectively. The fourth and final volume was released in December 2020. A manga adaptation started serialization in the May issue of the Bessatsu Shōnen Magazine in 2021, and finished in February 2024. It was compiled into seven volumes.

The light novels follow Risuka Mizukura, a fifth grader with magic powers, and Kizutaka Kugi, a genius class representative with lofty ambitions, as they go on a "magic hunt" around Saga Prefecture in search of Risuka's father, Shingo Mizukura. They encounter Mages and battles along the way.

== Plot ==
The novels take place in the Kyushu island region. Nagasaki Prefecture, in the early twentieth century, was a magical kingdom whose imminent power prompted the Americans to drop the atomic bomb on them in World War II. In current times, Nagasaki is full of magicians and is called the Land of Magic, but has isolated itself within a walled city. The magicians on the outside must keep their abilities a secret, and are limited in that they cannot cross the ocean.

Risuka Mizukura, a ten-year-old girl living in nearby Saga Prefecture, is the daughter of one of the most powerful wizards. When she is not attending school, she searches for her father. Her magical ability allows her to transform her physical age; when she is about to die, she can transform to her prime physical age of 27. She teams up with Kizutaka Kugi, a ten-year-old class representative, who is a genius and a sociopath with desires to rule people, treating everyone he meets as pawns. Kizutaka is termed a "Mage User", although he has no intrinsic magical abilities.

The light novels are framed with quotes from H.P. Lovecraft's works, and also use terminology from Lovecraft's The Call of Cthulhu. (Note: Faust 2 p. 3)

== Characters ==
Risuka Mizukura
Risuka Mizukura (水倉りすか), also known as "The Red Witch of Time", is a fifth grader in the Saga Prefecture. At the start of the story, she has been magic hunting for two years, and has worked with classmate Kizutaka Kugi for a year. While she is listed on the elementary school register, she rarely attends, preferring to stay at home transcribing magic tomes and watching sumo wrestling. Born and raised in Moriyashiki City in Nagasaki Prefecture, Risuka did not learn Japanese until she moved to Saga to search for her father, Shingo. Kizutaka calls her speech "like a bad translation from the German" because she reverses the subject and predicate; for instance, she says, "Most grateful to Kizutaka" instead of "I'm grateful to you" or "What I do not know is who is looking at us from where" instead of "Someone is looking at us, but I don't know who or where." (Note: Faust 2 p. 17-18)
Risuka's magic classification is: Element: Water, Type: Time, and Manifestation: Moment. Most of her magic abilities involve shedding her blood and borrowing time. For example, she can appear to heal or move to a place instantly by fast-forwarding her life. When she loses a large amount of blood, she can, for one minute, become 27 years old, which is her prime fighting and magic casting condition, and she is very aggressive.
Kizutaka Kugi
"Mage User" Kizutaka Kugi (供犠創貴) is the viewpoint character, a fifth grader who does not have any magical powers. Although he is a model student that serves as a class representative every term, Kizutaka looks down on everyone, seeing them as pawns. When he visits Risuka's household to check on her truancy, he senses she is not normal, but keeps close ties with his "pawn". Despite his arrogance, he desires to make everyone happy. He acts rebellious towards his father, but acknowledges that he has respect for him.
Tsunagi
Tsunagi (ツナギ) is a girl who appears to be the same age as Risuka and Kizutaka, but is actually over 2000 years old, having been transformed into a Mage by Risuka's father. She is the founder of the Gate Management Committee, which has regulated travel in and out of Nagasaki Prefecture, but has been working as the leader of an isolated frontline unit. Her goal is to find Shingo and make him kill her. Although she is experienced and reliable, she is poor at dealing with unfavorable circumstances. After fighting Risuka and friends, she transfers to their elementary school under the name "Itachi Tsunagiba" (繋場いたち) in order to "observe" them.
Tsunagi's magic classification is: Element: Meat, Type: Decomposition. She has 512 mouths on her body and can absorb magic powers from anybody or anything she eats.
Shingo Mizukura
"Nyarlathotep" Shingo Mizukura (水倉神檎) is Risuka's father, who has been missing in the stories covered by the light novels. He originally possessed 666 titles, but gave the "Red Witch of Time" title to Risuka. He is rumored to be plotting an "ark" project which would allow Mages to cross water.
Kizutsugu Kugi
Kizutsugu Kugi (供犠創嗣) is Kizutaka's father. Although he is a powerful police detective in Saga Prefecture, he is a womanizer, and is separated from his sixth wife. He does not have a close relationship with Kizutaka, but is quite fond of Risuka. He usually wears a bright white suit, and enjoys sweets and curry.

== Production ==
The motivation for writing the story came from Kodansha's editor Katsushi Ōta's idea of a media mix of witchy characters. (Note: Nisio Isin Chronicle p. 82) When the first issue of Faust was published, Nisio was asked to write the story to realize this plan, and this work was born, for which Ota says, "I cried and said, 'It will never be made into an anime." The time when the project was requested seems to have been around the time of the publication of Kubikiri Cycle: The Blue Savant and the Nonsense User.

The keyword of the project requested by Ota was "witch-child detective," and Nisio thought that "witch-child" but "detective" would be difficult for him, so he reread The Complete Works of Lovecraft, which he had read when he was in junior high school, to prepare for the project. In the process of writing, Nisio also watched various videos of magical girls. (Note: Nisio Isin Chronicle p. 62) Initially, the title was planned to be "Magical Girl Risuka," but after Ota's comment that he wanted something like "New Century" (新世紀, Shinseiki) from Neon Genesis Evangelion, "New Authentic" (新本格, Shin Honkaku) was added. (Note: Eureka p. 179) Ota's definition of a "magical girl" is one who transforms into an adult, but Nisio's version of her was like Ojamajo Doremi, where the clothes simply change with a spell. For this reason, in writing about a magical girl who transforms into an adult, Nisio needed to find a reason to convince himself. And what came out was the magic of time manipulation, and the character of Risuka Mizukura was created.

The Cthulhu Mythos is cited as a device to alleviate the "falseness of general magic in fiction". (Note: Eureka p. 104) At the beginning of the book, there is a quote from a novel by H. P. Lovecraft, the author of the Cthulhu Mythos. The magic settings are also thought to be based on the Cthulhu Mythos. (Note: Eureka p. 87) Also, the dialogue is similar to that of the manga JoJo's Bizarre Adventure, (Note: Eureka p. 182) and Nisio says that he wrote this work with the feeling that it could be called "the new JoJo".

Kinu Nishimura, who was in charge of the illustrations, was approached by Ota to participate in this work when she was working for Capcom. After seeing Nishimura's illustrations after the production of the first and second episodes, Nisio stated that Kizutaka has become a good guy since then and that the illustrations changed the direction of the story following the Monogatari Series.

Although it has nothing to do with Nisio's other work, Zaregoto Series, in terms of content, the fact that the strongest character in the series is colored red makes it Nisio's own "forbidden crossover".

The three works published in 2020, The Venice of Humanity's Strongest, Delivery Room, and New Authentic Magical Girl Risuka 4, are connected in their subject matter, but this is said to be an expression of Nisio's feeling that the previously published The Veiled Man Hypothesis is a work on the theme of "family" and that he could have delved deeper into that area.

== Media ==
=== Light novel ===
Mahō Shōjo Risuka began as a series of light novels written by Nisio Isin and illustrated by Kinu Nishimura from Capcom. The chapters were published in the Japanese magazine Faust, running from December 2003 to August 2008. They were later compiled into three light novels published by Kodansha from 2004 to 2007. In 2006, Kodansha announced a fourth light novel, Shin Honkaku Mahō Shōjo Risuka 0 (新本格魔法少女りすか 0), but it has not been released. The tenth chapter was scheduled for release in 2006, but was delayed until 2008.

The series resumed serialization in another magazine, Mephisto, released on April 8, 2020. Chapters 1 and 10 were republished in the Mephisto Vol. 3 2019, with two new chapters published in April and August 2020 issues. The fourth and final volume of the series was released on December 9, 2020, with an additional, thirteenth chapter.

Magical Girl Risuka (a translation of "Easy magic cannot be used.") was a featured short story in the English anthology, Faust Volume 2, which was released on June 23, 2009, by Del Rey Manga.

Volume		Chapter	Magazine appearance	Light novel release
1	Shin Honkaku Mahō Shōjo Risuka (新本格魔法少女りすか)	1. Easy magic cannot be used. (やさしい魔法はつかえない。)	Faust Vol. 1 (October 2003); ISBN 4-06-179553-8; Mephisto Vol. 3 (December 2019)	July 17, 2004; ISBN 978-4-06-182381-5; April 15, 2020 (Bunko); ISBN 978-4-06-518649-7
1	Shin Honkaku Mahō Shōjo Risuka (新本格魔法少女りすか)	2. Let there be light where there is shadow. (影あるところに光あれ。)	Faust Vol. 2 (March 2004); ISBN 4-06-179554-6	July 17, 2004; ISBN 978-4-06-182381-5; April 15, 2020 (Bunko); ISBN 978-4-06-518649-7
1	Shin Honkaku Mahō Shōjo Risuka (新本格魔法少女りすか)	3. Evil in disguise. (不幸中の災い。)	—	July 17, 2004; ISBN 978-4-06-182381-5; April 15, 2020 (Bunko); ISBN 978-4-06-518649-7
2	Shin Honkaku Mahō Shōjo Risuka 2 (新本格魔法少女りすか2)	4. Enemy of my enemy is my arch-enemy! (敵の敵は天敵！)	Faust Vol. 3 (July 2004); ISBN 4-06-179430-2	March 16, 2005; ISBN 978-4-06-182432-4; August 12, 2020 (Bunko); ISBN 978-4-06-520411-5
2	Shin Honkaku Mahō Shōjo Risuka 2 (新本格魔法少女りすか2)	5. Magical Girls kill with their eyes! (魔法少女は目で殺す！)	Faust Vol. 4 (November 2004); ISBN 4-06-179446-9	March 16, 2005; ISBN 978-4-06-182432-4; August 12, 2020 (Bunko); ISBN 978-4-06-520411-5
2	Shin Honkaku Mahō Shōjo Risuka 2 (新本格魔法少女りすか2)	6. Departure! (出征！)	—	March 16, 2005; ISBN 978-4-06-182432-4; August 12, 2020 (Bunko); ISBN 978-4-06-520411-5
3	Shin Honkaku Mahō Shōjo Risuka 3 (新本格魔法少女りすか3)	7. A key presence!! (鍵となる存在!!)	Faust Vol. 5 (May 2005); ISBN 4-06-179572-4	March 23, 2007; ISBN 978-4-06-182521-5; December 15, 2020 (Bunko); ISBN 978-4-06-521643-9
3	Shin Honkaku Mahō Shōjo Risuka 3 (新本格魔法少女りすか3)	8. No trespassing except for outsiders!! (部外者以外立入禁止!!)	Faust Vol. 6, Side-A (November 2005); ISBN 4-06-179586-4	March 23, 2007; ISBN 978-4-06-182521-5; December 15, 2020 (Bunko); ISBN 978-4-06-521643-9
3	Shin Honkaku Mahō Shōjo Risuka 3 (新本格魔法少女りすか3)	9. I do not see you in my dreams!! (夢では会わない!!)	Faust Vol. 6, Side-B (December 2005); ISBN 4-06-179587-2	March 23, 2007; ISBN 978-4-06-182521-5; December 15, 2020 (Bunko); ISBN 978-4-06-521643-9
4	Shin Honkaku Mahō Shōjo Risuka 4 (新本格魔法少女りすか4)	10. Alarming set of problems!!! (由々しき問題集!!!)	Faust Vol. 7 (August 2008); ISBN 978-4-06-378821-1; Mephisto Vol. 3 (December 2019)	December 9, 2020; ISBN 978-4-06-521560-9; December 15, 2022 (Bunko); ISBN 978-4-06-529616-5
4	Shin Honkaku Mahō Shōjo Risuka 4 (新本格魔法少女りすか4)	11. Pipe dreams about future!!! (将来の夢物語!!!)	Mephisto Vol. 1 (April 2020)	December 9, 2020; ISBN 978-4-06-521560-9; December 15, 2022 (Bunko); ISBN 978-4-06-529616-5
4	Shin Honkaku Mahō Shōjo Risuka 4 (新本格魔法少女りすか4)	12. Final bloody battle!!! (最終血戦!!!)	Mephisto Vol. 2 (August 2020)	December 9, 2020; ISBN 978-4-06-521560-9; December 15, 2022 (Bunko); ISBN 978-4-06-529616-5
4	Shin Honkaku Mahō Shōjo Risuka 4 (新本格魔法少女りすか4)	Final. What if easy magic can be used? (やさしい魔法がつかえたら？)	—	December 9, 2020; ISBN 978-4-06-521560-9; December 15, 2022 (Bunko); ISBN 978-4-06-529616-5

=== Manga ===
Hiro Mashima, in commemoration of the release of the fourth volume of the series, drew a scene from the chapter "Easy magic cannot be used." and Kodansha released it via Twitter on the Nisio Isin official account (in Japanese) on November 27, 2020.

A manga adaptation was announced on December 3, 2020, and started serialization on April 9, 2021, in Bessatsu Shōnen Magazine, with Nao Emoto as illustrator. In January 2023 issue of the magazine it was announced that the manga is entering hiatus due to Nao Emoto going on a maternity leave; it was expected to resume serialization in spring 2023. The series finished on February 9, 2024. It was compiled into seven volumes from August 17, 2021, to April 9, 2024.

No.	Japanese release date	Japanese ISBN
1	August 17, 2021	978-4-06-523154-8
1. "Subway Accident" (Subway Accident); 2. "They cannot help but test their power" (暴力を試さずにはいられない); 3. "The Red Witch of Time" (赤き時の魔女); ⠀⠀⠀Extra. "Three years before!" (その3年前だ！)
2	November 17, 2021	978-4-06-525983-2
4. "The kidnapper of young girls" (少女専門の誘拐犯); 5. "Shadow Kingdom" (Shadow Kingdom); 6. "The one who broke the recorded promise" (記された約束を破る者); 7. "The Demon of Pestering and Cherishing" (迫害にして博愛の悪魔)
3	March 9, 2022	978-4-06-527268-8
8. "Irregular" (イレギュラー); 9. "From Beyond" (From Beyond); 10. "Speak for yourself with that forehead mouth!" (額の口で自己紹介！); 11. "The Mouth!" (口が！)
4	July 8, 2022	978-4-06-528379-0
12. "Eating One" (Eating One); 13. "Bye-bye!" (バイバイッ！); 14. "The Gate Committee!" (城門管理委員会！); 15. "Anyone who sees it dies!" (見たら死ぬ！)
5	April 7, 2023	978-4-06-531288-9
16. "Evil Eye" (Evil Eye); 17. "Look Back" (Look Back); 18. "Up-Down Game" (up-down game); 19. "Key Person!!" (Key Person!!); 20. "Dice & Bingo" (DICE & BINGO)
6	November 11, 2023	978-4-06-533506-2
21. "Reason to lose!!" (負ける理由!!); 22. "Keep Out" (Keep Out); 23. "What must be done!!" (やらなければならないこと!!); 24. "Friends and family!" (仲間と家族!!); 25. "Problem Set" (Problem Set)
7	April 9, 2024	978-4-06-535165-9
26. "Demon World!!!" (魔界!!!); 27. "Box Cutter!!!" (カッターナイフ!!!); 28. "Blood Type" (Blood Type); 29. "Orikuchi Kizuna!!!" (折口きずな!!!); ⠀⠀Final. "What if easy magic can be used?" (やさしい魔法がつかえたら？)

== Reception ==
Andrew Cunningham, the English translator for Faust magazine, notes "the author's clear intent to explode everything dark about magical girls without any of the nauseating sugar that usually coats them make it alternately horrifying and gripping." Ken Haley of Manga Recon found Kizutaka "incredibly snotty and unlikable. Unfortunately, this really hurts the story's enjoyability as Kizutaka is our POV character." He also found the end of the short story "very unsatisfying and confusing".
