= Klimowicz =

Klimowicz is a Polish-language surname. The same form is used by men and women. Klimowicz is related to a number of surnames in other languages:

Language	Masculine	Feminine
Belarusian	Клімовіч: Klimovich, Klimovič (romanization)	
Latvian	Kļimovičs	
Lithuanian	Klimavičius	Klimavičienė (married); Klimavičiūtė (unmarried)
Polish	Klimowicz	Klimowiczowa (married); Klimowiczówna (unmarried)
Russian	Климович: Klimovich (scholarly: Klimovič)	
Serbo-Croatian	Klimović	
Ukrainian	Климович: Klymovych (scholarly: Klymovyč)	

== People ==
- Cyryl Klimowicz (born 1952), Ordinary of the Roman Catholic Diocese of Saint Joseph in Irkutsk, Russia
- Diego Klimowicz (born 1974), Argentine soccer player
- Eliasz Klimowicz (1864 – 1940), Polish-Belarusian peasant and a dissident Eastern Orthodox religious leader
- Hillary Klimowicz (born 1987), American basketball player
- Javier Klimowicz (born 1977), Argentinian-born Ecuadorian soccer player
- Linda Klimovičová (born 2004), Czech-born Polish tennis player
- Mateo Klimowicz (born 2000), Argentinian soccer player
- Mieczysław Klimowicz (1919–2008), Polish historian
- Stanley Clements (born Stanislaw Klimowicz; 1926–1981), Polish American actor and comedian
