= Zero Escape =

- Series logo
- Genres: Visual novel, escape room
- Developers: Spike Chunsoft; Chime
- Publishers: JP/WW: Spike Chunsoft; NA/EU: Aksys Games; EU: Rising Star Games (Note: For the initial release of Virtue's Last Reward.)
- Artists: Kinu Nishimura; Rui Tomono
- Writer: Kotaro Uchikoshi
- Composer: Shinji Hosoe
- Platforms: Nintendo DS, Nintendo 3DS, PlayStation Vita, PlayStation 4, iOS, Windows, Xbox One
- First release: Nine Hours, Nine Persons, Nine Doors; December 10, 2009
- Latest release: Zero Time Dilemma; June 28, 2016

Zero Escape, formerly released in Japan as Kyokugen Dasshutsu (Japanese: 極限脱出; lit. "Extreme Escape"), is a series of adventure games directed and written by Kotaro Uchikoshi. The first two entries in the series, Nine Hours, Nine Persons, Nine Doors (2009) and Zero Escape: Virtue's Last Reward (2012), were developed by Spike Chunsoft (formerly Chunsoft), while the third entry, Zero Time Dilemma (2016), was developed by Chime. Zero Escape is published by Spike Chunsoft in Japan, while Aksys Games and Rising Star Games have published the games for North America and Europe respectively.

Each game in the series follows a group of nine individuals, who are kidnapped and held captive by a person code-named "Zero", and are forced to play a game of life and death to escape. The gameplay is divided into two types of sections: Novel sections, where the story is presented, and Escape sections, where the player solves escape-the-room puzzles. In the first two games, the Novel sections are presented in a visual novel format, whereas the third uses animated cutscenes. The stories branch based on player choices, and include multiple endings.

In addition to Uchikoshi, the development team includes character designers Kinu Nishimura and Rui Tomono, and music composer Shinji Hosoe. The series was originally conceived when Chunsoft wanted Uchikoshi to write visual novels for a wider audience; he came up with the idea of combining the story with story-integrated puzzles. While Nine Hours, Nine Persons, Nine Doors was initially planned as a stand-alone title, its success in the international market led to the development of two sequels, intended to be paired as a set. Both Nine Hours, Nine Persons, Nine Doors and Virtue's Last Reward were commercial failures in Japan, and the third game was put on hold in 2014, only to resume development for Zero Time Dilemma the following year, due to fan demand and the hiatus becoming big news. Critics have been positive to the series, praising its narrative for being experimental and for pushing boundaries for what can be done with video game narratives.

== Titles ==
=== Main games ===
Release timeline
2009	Nine Hours, Nine Persons, Nine Doors
2010
2011
2012	Zero Escape: Virtue's Last Reward
2013
2014
2015
2016	Zero Time Dilemma
2017	Zero Escape: The Nonary Games

The series consists of three video games. The first two games were released in English by Aksys Games in North America, and the second game was released in English in Europe by Rising Star Games. The third game was released by Aksys Games in both North America and Europe for consoles, and by Spike Chunsoft worldwide for Windows.

- Nine Hours, Nine Persons, Nine Doors is the first game in the series, developed by Chunsoft. It was released for the Nintendo DS on December 10, 2009, in Japan and on November 16, 2010, in North America, and for iOS on May 28, 2013, in Japan and internationally on March 17, 2014.
- Zero Escape: Virtue's Last Reward is the second game in the series. It was released for the Nintendo 3DS and the PlayStation Vita on February 16, 2012, in Japan, on October 23 in North America, and on November 23 in Europe.
- Zero Time Dilemma is the third game in the series. It was released for the Nintendo 3DS and the PlayStation Vita on June 28, 2016, in North America and Europe, and on June 30 in Japan. A Windows version was released worldwide on June 30. A PlayStation 4 version was released in Japan in August 2017, while an Xbox One version was released on August 30, 2022.

A bundle containing the first two games, titled Zero Escape: The Nonary Games, was released for Windows, PlayStation 4, and PlayStation Vita in the West on March 24, 2017. In Japan, the Windows version launched on March 25 and the console versions on April 13 the same year. The European PlayStation Vita version was released on December 15. The Nonary Games was also released for Xbox One on March 22, 2022.

The updated version of Nine Hours, Nine Persons, Nine Doors has separate Adventure and Novel modes; the Adventure mode presents the character interactions similar to the top screen of the original game, while Novel mode uses the additional narration from the bottom screen. Both modes have animated characters and voice acting. The updated version also includes a story flowchart, similar to the other two games in the series, to help players with getting to the game's true ending. It does not include the additional story content that was part of the iOS version, but the final puzzle is different. The new version of Virtue's Last Reward is primarily based on the original PlayStation Vita version, but corrects some typographic errors.

=== Other media and appearances ===
A novelization of the first game, titled Kyokugen Dasshutsu 9 Jikan 9 Nin 9 no Tobira Alterna, was written by Kenji Kuroda and published by Kodansha in Japan in two volumes in 2010. An original video animation based on the beginning of the second game was made by Gonzo; it has been dubbed and released in English by Aksys Games. An untitled Flash game was made for Virtue's Last Reward and made available on the official Japanese developer website. An artbook featuring art from the first two games was published by SB Creative in 2012 in Japan; an artbook for the third game was released as a pre-order bonus in Japan, and is sold separately in the West. Music albums with the soundtracks of the first two games were released by Super Sweep on December 23, 2009, and April 19, 2012, respectively. Aksys is also considering releasing merchandise based on the third game.

Aksys and Spike Chunsoft worked with the Japanese puzzle event studio SCRAP to create Real Zero Escape: Trust on Trial, a real-life room escape game based on the Zero Escape universe, which was held at SCRAP's studio in Little Tokyo in Los Angeles for several months, starting in April 2016. Players had to solve real-life escape-the-room puzzles in the spirit of the Zero Escape series within a limited amount of time.

== Common elements ==
=== Gameplay ===
An Escape section in Nine Hours, Nine Persons, Nine Doors. The player escapes rooms by solving puzzles, which involves finding and combining items.

The gameplay of the series is divided into two types of segments: Novel sections – presented in a visual novel format in the first two games, and as animated cutscenes in the third – and Escape sections, which are escape-the-room scenarios. During the Novel sections, the player reads dialogue, occasionally inputting choices that change the course of the story. During the Escape sections, the player aims to find a way out of rooms by exploring the room and solving puzzles. The player can move around during these sections, and can pick up and combine items in order to open locks or get access to new items. Each room also includes more complex puzzles, such as sliding puzzles and mini-games, which can't be solved without finding clues in the room.

The games are non-linear: the first two games' stories branch depending on player choices, and lead to several different endings, with a final true ending that the player can only reach by playing through various different branches; the third game divides the story into chapters called "fragments", each representing a 90-minute period, which can be chosen from a "Floating Fragment" menu and played out of order. In the first game, the player has to start over from the beginning after completing each branch, replaying Escape sections; in the second game, the branches are represented by an interactive flowchart, allowing the player to jump to any point in the game that they have reached, and try different outcomes. This flowchart was also implemented in the iOS and The Nonary Games versions of the first game. In the third game, fragments are placed in a flowchart upon completion, indicating where they take place in the story.

=== Plot and themes ===
The three Zero Escape games are narratively linked, with events of Zero Time Dilemma occurring between 999 and Virtue's Last Reward. Each game in the series follows a group of nine people who get kidnapped by masked individuals who call themselves "Zero", and are locked inside a facility where they are forced to play a death game where the participants are locked inside rooms and have to solve puzzles in order to get out. In the first two games, the death game is referred to as the Nonary Game, while the one in the third game is called the Decision Game. The characters do not at first appear to have anything in common, but throughout the course of the games, it is revealed that each was chosen for a specific purpose, including connections to previous narrative elements from the other games in the series. The characters attempt to escape from the facility, to identify Zero, and to learn of Zero's goal.

The series has science fiction and horror elements, and philosophical and supernatural themes. A recurring theme is the concept of morphogenetic fields, which is explored in different ways in each game, and is the main theme of the first game. The second game focuses on game theory, specifically on the prisoner's dilemma. The third game's main theme is morality, and it is the game in the series with the largest focus on philosophy.

== Development ==
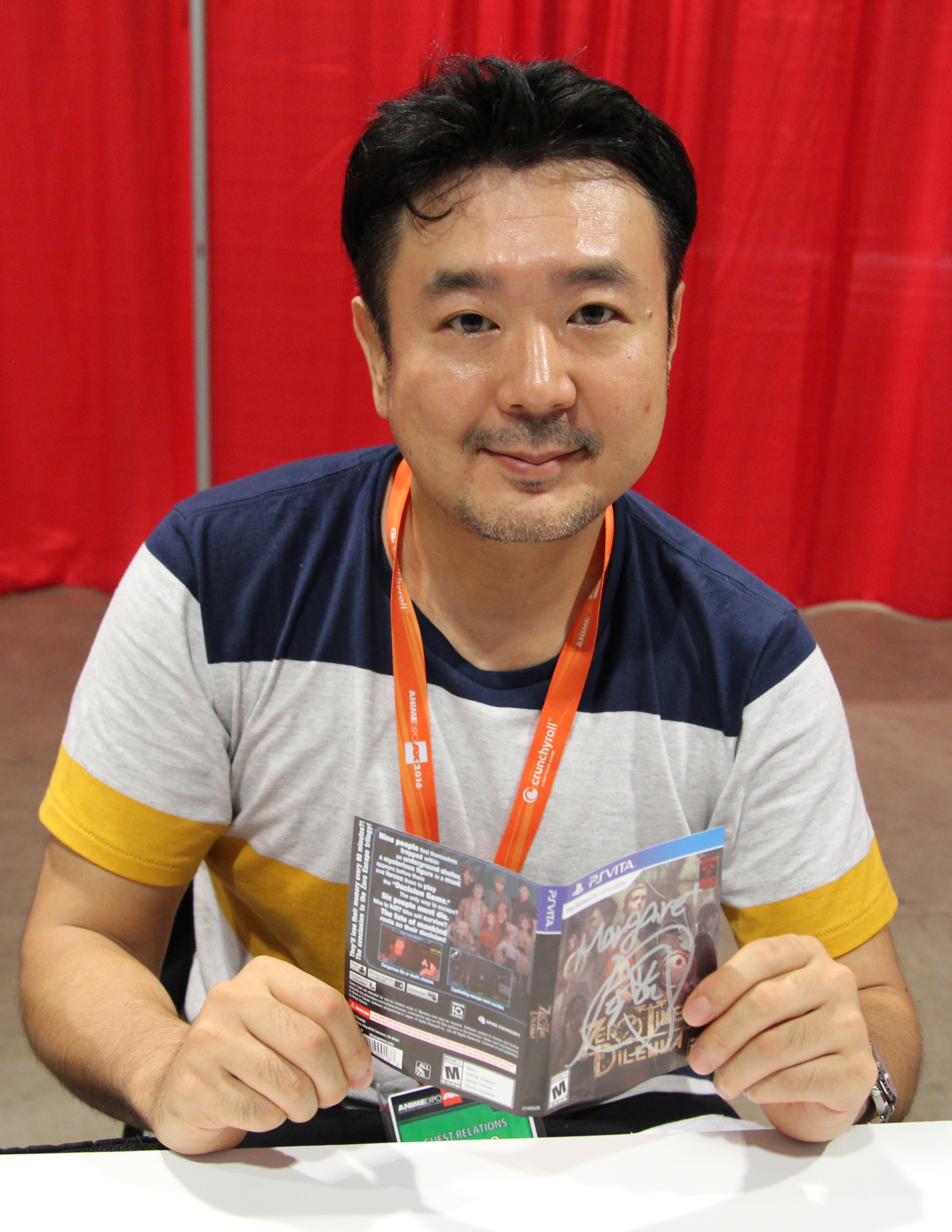
The series is directed and written by Kotaro Uchikoshi.

The first two Zero Escape titles were developed by Chunsoft, while the third was developed by Chime. The series is directed and written by Kotaro Uchikoshi, with music by Shinji Hosoe. Character design was handled by Kinu Nishimura in the first two games, and by Rui Tomono in the third. The series was originally conceived when Chunsoft contacted Uchikoshi and asked him to write visual novels for them; they had found success in the genre, but wanted to create a new type of visual novels which could be received by a wider audience. Uchikoshi's idea for this was to combine puzzles with a story, in a way where puzzles are integrated into the story and includes clues, and need to be solved in order for the player to make progress. The inspiration for the first game was the question "where do mankind's inspirations come from?"; while researching it, Uchikoshi came across the theories of the English biochemist Rupert Sheldrake, and used them as the main theme. The game's setting was meant as a depiction of two of humanity's instinctive desires: the unconscious desire to return to one's mother's womb and shut oneself away, and the desire to escape and overcome one's current condition.

Uchikoshi had initially written 999 as a stand-alone game, but its positive reception led to its sequels' development. The tension present in its first sequel Virtue's Last Reward was deliberately toned down from that in 999, as the results of a survey indicated that some Japanese people had not bought 999 because it seemed "too scary". Uchikoshi stated that Zero Time Dilemma, the second sequel which was released in 2016, will "tone it up" in response to feedback from players who praised the sense of fear present in 999. The two sequels were specifically intended to be "paired as a set": the second game has a cliffhanger ending, while Uchikoshi intended for the third game to resolve all mysteries left from the second game, as well as all introduced in the third game. While he intended for the series to be a trilogy with a story that ends on the third game, he is open to "new incidents arriving" if fans still request it.

While the first game performed well enough in the West for Spike Chunsoft to decide to develop a sequel, both games were commercial failures in Japan. Because of this, the third game, which had originally been mentioned in 2012, was not approved by the management at the company. By February 2014, the development was put on hold indefinitely. Uchikoshi examined the possibility of financing the development through the use of crowdfunding on a website like Kickstarter, but felt that the idea would not be persuasive enough for it to meet the goal; he also sought out opportunities with executives and investors. As a response to the news of the game's hiatus, fans of the series created Operation Bluebird, an online campaign to raise awareness of the series and support the development. By July 2015, the development of the third game had been resumed; the game being put on hold becoming big news, and fans being vocal about wanting a third game, was what led to the game being reevaluated. With the third game, the development team wanted to renew the series' image in Japan; to do this, they used the English series title, Zero Escape, instead of the Kyokugen Dasshutsu title that had been used for previous Japanese releases.

=== Writing ===
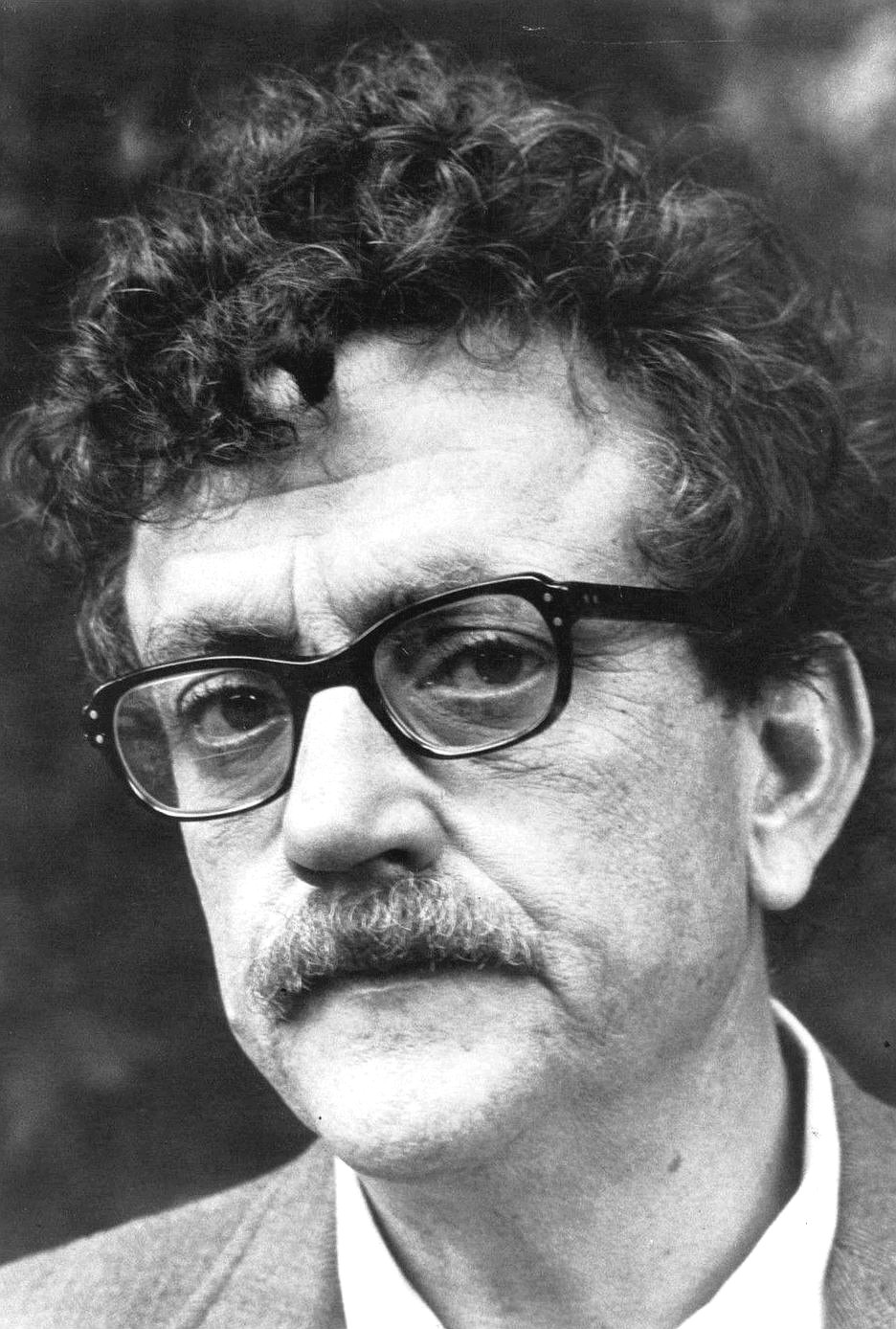
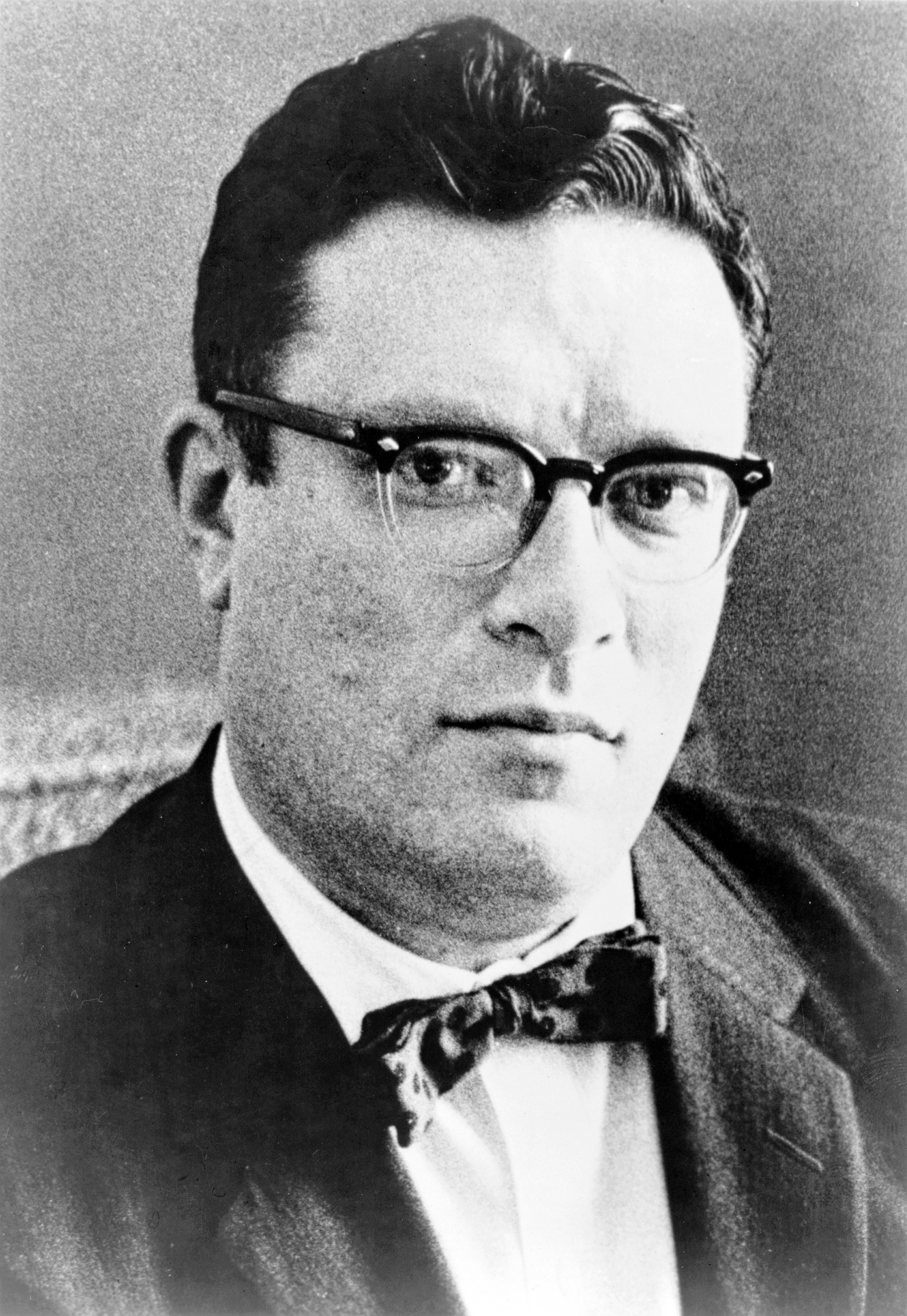
Among Uchikoshi's influences for the series are writers Kurt Vonnegut (left) and Isaac Asimov (right).

For Zero Escape, Uchikoshi conceived the storytelling as being gameplay; he said that while other games might consist of the player shooting people, with a story just there to enhance it, he thinks that the narrative of visual novels should be gameplay. As an example of this, the second game has players learn information and not being able to continue past certain points until they have input a solution; this was influenced by the 1994 video game Kamaitachi no Yoru, and was intended to make the story get "under the skin" of players, and allow the player and the player character to understand the game world in tandem, and progress together. Among other influences for the series were writers Isaac Asimov and Kurt Vonnegut; Uchikoshi felt that 90% of any creative work consists of pieces from others' works, and that the remaining 10% is creativity, with the result being worthwhile hinging on how well a writer can incorporate their influences with their own ideas.

Uchikoshi prioritized storylines over characters, and used the feeling of discomfort as the foundation of the narrative. He first came up with a setting, and then made characters along with the drama and stories behind them. After this, he decided on the core of the game's story, and created a flowchart based on it, which became the "bone structure of the story". According to Uchikoshi, it did not matter that the setups of the games were far-fetched, as long as their internal logic worked; he said that as long as the story is interesting and immersive, implausible situations feel plausible to the player. On the other hand, he felt that if he had specifically tried to make it more plausible, by forcing explanations that justify the situations, the story would become boring and the implausible would look even more implausible. Instead, he chose to rely on players' imagination, saying that players can make things seem plausible in ways he had not even imagined himself. One thing he did to make the stories more believable was adding concepts such as Schrödinger's cat, which he felt added flavor and kept players wondering whether a particular concept could be the main idea of the game; he felt that when players wonder that, it makes the story feel more real, as they create the game world in their minds.

After deciding on the story and the main character, he would balance the characters, in terms of genders, personalities, and ages represented; when making character personalities, he used the Enneagram of Personality as reference, which classifies people into nine groups; the decision to do this came from the importance of the number "9" in the storyline of 999. An important thing to him when making characters was to create a mystery behind them, to make players curious about who the characters are and what their pasts are like. Another important element was the use of misdirection: by deliberately making certain characters seem like bad people, he would aim to get players to focus on them more, making it more difficult for them to see who the "real bad guy" is. He aimed to not give the player characters strong personalities, in order to make it easier for players to empathize with them. He chose to have the games be played from a first person perspective as he felt it makes for "a stronger impact" and is more interesting than a third person perspective; it was also used to limit the information that is available to the player in a realistic way, as the player only knows what they experience or are told. Because the player characters in most games can die many times, Uchikoshi felt that video game characters' deaths may be taken lightly, which he saw as a weak point in games. To combat this, he focused on trying to get players to want to keep the story alive, rather than trying to keep the player character alive; as a result of wanting to keep the story going, players would also avoid the death of their character.

When writing the stories, he started with their twist endings, and then worked his way back from that. He designed the flow of the story by using a spreadsheet, and wrote prototypes of potential outcomes of the different scenarios in the game; after this, he matched it with the flowchart he had made, and came up with the details of each story. As he wrote each scene, he imagined what the player might be thinking as they play through it, and decided what to write based on it; this was one of the most important things to him when writing. A key element to Uchikoshi when writing the outcomes of player decisions is that the importance of the decision usually is much greater after the player has made it, with the consequences only being revealed later on as the player learns more information; this was to maintain the high suspense level, and to avoid situations where choices end up not actually mattering. One big challenge for him was to maintain player interest through all branches; he tried to have each branch develop differently, as to avoid repetition and fatigue, and keep the player motivated. While he came up with the set-up, the setting, and the characters on his own, he had a sub-writer helping him with writing the second game, and two sub-writers for the third game. They would help with brainstorming ideas and finding what does not work so well and how to improve scenarios.

=== Puzzles ===
The Escape sequences were made to appeal to the players' instinctive desires; Uchikoshi wanted the player to experience the instinctive pleasure of "I found it!". For the puzzles, Uchikoshi would think about the details within the overall story, and the gimmicks and props found in the game; after deciding on them, they were integrated with the puzzles. He would also use puzzle-related websites as reference. He did not handle puzzle design himself, instead leaving a lot of the direction to other staff, and checking it multiple times. Because of the puzzle–story integration, the development team tried to avoid situations where the player gets stuck due to being unable to solve a puzzle, by including hints that would appear if the player repeatedly clicked on items; as the player continues clicking, the hints get more obvious, to the point of almost revealing the solution outright. In the second game, a difficulty setting was added, with puzzles being easier to solve on lower settings.

While the first game was in 2D, the second game features 3D graphics; this change affected the puzzle creation, as the development team could choose to layer objects behind each other or have them all visible at once. As the second game was made with a worldwide release in mind, Japanese characters and references to Japanese culture were avoided in the puzzle design; the puzzles ended up using numbers a lot since they are internationally used symbols. For the iOS version of the first game, the puzzles were removed and replaced with new story sequences; this was done as the development team wanted to reach people who are not good at solving puzzles, or who do not play games at all and who might not have a game console, but according to Uchikoshi, the staff felt that the game was incomplete without the puzzle sequences of the original version.

== Localization ==
The series is localized by Aksys Games; Chunsoft was first introduced to Aksys through Spike, when Chunsoft was looking for a company that could publish the first game in the United States. During Aksys' evaluation period of it, many people at the company did not believe in the game and turned it down; as many of the people who evaluate games at Aksys do not speak Japanese, it was difficult for them to determine whether a game was good or not. Eventually, they decided to localize it, which was considered a big risk for the company. They worked by the philosophy of keeping true to the spirit of the original Japanese version, opting to make dialogue sound like what a native speaker would say rather than strictly adhering to the Japanese wording. Ben Bateman, the editor of the first two games' localizations, did this by looking at the writing from a wider view, examining it line by line or scene by scene, rather than word by word or sentence by sentence, and thinking about how to convey the same idea in English. Most parts of the games that include a joke in the localization also have a joke in the Japanese versions, but a different one; Bateman did try to make similar types of jokes with similar contents and ideas. He was given mostly free rein in what he could change or add to the writing, as long as it did not disrupt the plot.

The biggest challenge with localizing the series was to keep track of everything, as the games feature branching paths, and the characters learn different things in different branches, affecting word choices and attitudes. While a lot of this had been taken care of by Spike Chunsoft, many parts of the game required different word choices in English depending on if a character knew of a particular thing or not; in these cases, the localization team had to track the story backwards. During the projects, Aksys Games would do email correspondence with Spike Chunsoft, to make sure that they conveyed the message of the games as intended. The title Zero Escape was decided on during the localization of the second game, when the localization team wanted to create a "branding umbrella" for both games. They chose the title based on what they thought defines the first two games and is common to both of them, concluding that it was the character Zero and how both games involve "a dangerous escape"; the title also has the double meaning of "you have zero chance to escape". The title was later used as part of the Japanese title for Zero Time Dilemma, and replaced the previous Japanese title Kyokugen Dasshutsu for the re-release of Nine Hours, Nine Persons, Nine Doors and Virtue's Last Reward.

For the first game, a big challenge was getting the localization done in time; Nobara Nakayama, the game's translator, worked on it for 30 days, and the editing process took two months. Because of this, Bateman had to do most of the work "on the fly". Nakayama had started playing the game prior to starting work on the localization, but did not finish playing it until she was more than halfway through translating it; after learning that the plot hinged on a Japanese pun, they had to halt the localization, discuss it with Uchikoshi, come up with a solution, and go through the whole game to make sure that it still made sense. The second game took around three months to translate and four months to edit. A big challenge in localizing it was catching the several subtle hints to the game's ending that appear throughout the story. Unlike the previous two Zero Escape titles, the North American version of the third game was produced alongside the Japanese version.

== Reception ==
Japanese and Western review scores As of October 21, 2017.
Game	Famitsu	Metacritic
Nine Hours, Nine Persons, Nine Doors	36/40	82/100
Zero Escape: Virtue's Last Reward	34/40	88/100 (3DS); 84/100 (Vita)
Zero Time Dilemma	32/40	81/100 (3DS); 83/100 (Vita); 80/100 (PS4); 78/100 (Win)
Zero Escape: The Nonary Games	–	87/100 (PS4); 86/100 (Win); 83/100 (Vita)

The Zero Escape series has been positively received by critics, with the first two games in the series attaining perfect scores in reviews from various publications. Uchikoshi noted that the positive reception of 999 from international fans outside of Japan directly influenced the development of Virtue's Last Reward. Meanwhile, the series has been a commercial failure in Japan, with the first two games underperforming; in their respective debut years in Japan, the first game sold 27,762 copies, and the second sold 14,023 copies across Nintendo 3DS and PlayStation Vita. As of July 2018, the series has sold over 500,000 copies worldwide.

Several critics have praised the series' stories: Andy Goergen of Nintendo World Report commented on how 999 "truly expands what narrative video games can be capable of", and Christian Nutt at Gamasutra said that Uchikoshi is "pushing the boundaries of what video game narrative can be". Tony Ponce of Destructoid called 999 "one of the greatest videogame tales ever told", and a great example of how engaging and powerful narratives in video games can be. Bob Mackey of 1UP.com featured 999 on a list of "must-play" Nintendo DS visual novels, citing its story and themes as being among the darkest on a Nintendo platform, and called Virtue's Last Reward "one of the biggest, boldest visual novels to ever hit America". Writers for Famitsu liked the tense story and the sense of accomplishment when solving puzzles in 999, and the intertwined story and flowchart system in Virtue's Last Reward. Jason Schreier of Kotaku included both 999 and Virtue's Last Reward on a list of "must-play" visual novels worth playing even for people who do not like anime tropes. Schreier also wrote for Wired, calling 999's narrative "innovative" and saying that he liked the game's ending and cast, but that he thought that some of the game's prose was "sloppy" and that there was no sense of real danger.

Reception of the games' puzzle sections has been more mixed. Virtue's Last Reward was featured on Gamasutra's and Game Developer's jointly created list of the ten best games of 2012 for having storytelling as gameplay rather than aside from gameplay. Schreier disliked having to repeat puzzles in each playthrough of 999. Mike Manson of Nintendo Life and John McCaroll of RPGFan found problems with the controls used in the puzzle sections of Virtue's Last Reward. Austin Boosinger of Adventure Gamers felt that while the puzzles in Virtue's Last Reward were thematically appropriate, he thought they were "relatively uninspired in their variety" and that not many of them were fun or engaging.
