= Zero Time Dilemma =

2016 visual novel video game

- North American cover art
- Developer: Chime
- Publishers: NA/EU: Aksys Games; WW: Spike Chunsoft (Note: Published the game on all platforms in Japan, and on Windows via Steam worldwide)
- Director: Kotaro Uchikoshi
- Designer: Akira Okada
- Artist: Rui Tomono
- Writers: Kotaro Uchikoshi; Ken Shimomura; Makoto Yodawara
- Composer: Shinji Hosoe
- Series: Zero Escape
- Platforms: Nintendo 3DS; PlayStation Vita; Microsoft Windows; PlayStation 4; Xbox One
- Release: Nintendo 3DS, PS Vita: NA/EU: June 28, 2016; JP: June 30, 2016; Microsoft Windows: WW: June 30, 2016; PlayStation 4: JP: August 17, 2017; NA: August 18, 2017; EU: September 8, 2017; Xbox One: WW: August 30, 2022
- Genres: Adventure, visual novel, escape the room
- Mode: Single-player

Zero Time Dilemma, (Note: Known in Japan as Zero Escape: Toki no Jirenma (Japanese: ZERO ESCAPE 刻のジレンマ; "Zero Escape: Time Dilemma")) also known as Zero Escape: Zero Time Dilemma, is an adventure video game developed by Chime, and published by Spike Chunsoft and Aksys Games. It is the third entry in the Zero Escape series, following Nine Hours, Nine Persons, Nine Doors (2009) and Virtue's Last Reward (2012). The game was released for Nintendo 3DS, PlayStation Vita, and Microsoft Windows in 2016, for PlayStation 4 in 2017, and for Xbox One in 2022.

The story is set between the previous two games, and follows nine people who are kidnapped by a masked person known as Zero. They are divided into three teams, and forced to play a death game called the "Decision Game". The player takes the roles of three of the characters, and plays through the chapters the story is made up of: these consist of animated cinematics, escape-the-room puzzles, and moral decisions for the player to make. The chapters represent 90-minute periods, and can be played out of order.

The game was directed and written by series creator Kotaro Uchikoshi, and features music by Shinji Hosoe and character designs by Rui Tomono. Uchikoshi had started planning the game's story in 2012, but the development was put on hiatus due to the commercial failure of the series in Japan. In 2015, development was announced to have resumed in response to high demand from the series' fan base. The game was positively received by critics.

== Gameplay ==
In the Escape sections, the player searches for clues to be able to solve puzzles and escape from the room.

Zero Time Dilemma is an adventure game consisting of multiple chapters, representing 90-minute periods; chapters consist of narrative sections and escape-the-room puzzle sections. The chapters, referred to as "fragments", are chosen through the Floating Fragment system, in which the player gets to choose a fragment to play based on an image and a vague description. The fragments can be played out of order; the characters lose their memory after each 90-minute period, and do not know where they are in the timeline. When the player completes a fragment, they are returned to the Floating Fragment screen, and the completed fragment is placed in a narrative flowchart, indicating where it takes place in the story.

Narrative sections are presented as three-dimensional animated cinematics, with camera movements and full voice acting in Japanese and English. The Escape sections, which include thirteen different rooms, involve the player searching the room for tools and clues through a point-and-click interface in a first-person perspective and solving puzzles. The puzzles are mostly self-contained, and test the player's problem-solving skills and memory; among these are puzzles where the player has to decipher messages, and ones where they have to align the sides of a three-dimensional object correctly.

After completing an Escape section, the player needs to take a stance in a moral decision; one such decision involves one character being locked into a chair with a gun next to it and another character inside an incinerator. To stop the incinerator, the player needs to choose to pull the trigger, which has a 50% possibility of firing a live bullet, killing the character in the chair. The way the decisions are made varies: some involve choosing between options, and some have the player input their own answer.

== Plot ==
=== Setting and characters ===
Zero Time Dilemma is set between the events of Nine Hours, Nine Persons, Nine Doors and Virtue's Last Reward, taking place one year after the former. The game follows nine characters who have been locked up in an underground nuclear bomb shelter and are forced to play a death game called the Decision Game, which is led by a masked person known as Zero. The shelter is divided into three wards, with three people placed in each section, making up three teams: C-Team, Q-Team, and D-Team. To get to the central elevator hall and escape, the characters need six passwords; one password is revealed each time one of them dies. The characters are all wearing watches that inject them with a drug every 90 minutes, inducing memory loss. Heavily involved in the game's lore is the many-worlds theory, where every decision made creates alternate universes where the opposite was chosen; these timelines make up the game's multiple routes.

C-Team includes Carlos (Tomokazu Sugita/Andrew Bowen), a firefighter with a strong sense of justice; Akane (Miyuki Sawashiro/Rena Strober), a member of a secret society working for a peaceful future, and who pretends to be a "neat and clean, ideal Japanese woman"; and Junpei (Tatsuhisa Suzuki/Evan Smith), a childhood friend of Akane's, who has joined a detective agency to find her after she has not been heard from. Q-Team includes a naive amnesiac boy wearing a spherical helmet (Aki Toyosaki/Jonquill Goode); Eric (Akira Ishida/Keith Silverstein), an ice cream shop clerk who easily cracks under pressure; and Mira (Maaya Sakamoto/Rachael Kimsey), who does not show much emotion and is in a relationship with Eric. D-Team includes Diana (Mamiko Noto/Eden Riegel), a pacifist nurse who dislikes fighting; Phi (Chiaki Omagawa/Karen Strassman), an intelligent woman who participated in the Dcom (Dwelling for Experimental Cohabitation of Mars) experiment together with Akane and Sigma to save the world from the Radical-6 virus; and Sigma (Daisuke Ono/Matthew Mercer), a 67-year-old man in the body of a 22-year-old. Additionally, there is a dog named Gab who is able to pass through vents between the sections to deliver messages between the teams.

=== Synopsis ===
On December 31, 2028, the nine participants of the Dcom experiment are kidnapped by a masked individual known as Zero, who makes them play a coin toss; if they win, they are set free with no memory of what happened, and if they lose they awake in a facility separated into three wards, with one team in each. After losing, they are forced to play the "Decision Game", and submit a vote for one of the teams; the one with the most votes gets executed. At this point, the story starts branching into different timelines depending on player choices.

In one timeline, Phi is killed, and Diana and Sigma are trapped in the facility. They discover a transporter device, which they use to send copies of themselves to another timeline; their original selves remain, however, and the transporter takes ten months to recharge. They begin a relationship, and Diana later gives birth to fraternal twins, a boy and a girl whom they name Delta and Phi. Using the recharged transporter, they send the babies to the past, to keep them safe from Zero. In another timeline, Akane realizes that Carlos can send his consciousness between timelines in times of danger, which she calls "Spacetime Human Internal Fluctuating Transfer", or "shifting". Through the resonance from Carlos's ability, C-Team shifts between timelines to collect passwords, but Zero sends the boy in the helmet – revealed to be a humanoid robot named Sean – to attack them for violating the rules.

Carlos flees by shifting to the timeline that the copies of Diana and Sigma had been transported to. Diana and Sigma reach a room with sleeping pods, where they find and wake up Eric and Sean, and find the dead bodies of the remaining participants. Armed with a shotgun, Eric demands to know who killed Mira; Carlos says that he must be innocent as he was in the C Ward, but Diana realizes that the wards are not separate: there is only one lounge, which changes its appearance using projection mapping. They realize that only one team is active at a time, while the rest are kept asleep in the pods. Sean reveals Zero's true identity: he is Delta, an elderly man thought to be unable to walk, deaf, blind and mute, who had been with Q-Team the entire time, but off-camera from the player's perspective. He admits that he killed Mira, who is revealed to be a serial killer called the Heart Ripper, and prevents the participants from escaping by using his esper abilities to make Eric shoot everyone but Diana.

In the timeline leading to the events of Virtue's Last Reward, Phi is infected with Radical-6, which has a 75% possibility of causing suicidal intention. Junpei and Akane learn that Zero caused a Radical-6 outbreak in the hopes that it would kill a religious fanatic who would cause the complete extinction of humanity; Radical-6 was seen as the lesser evil, as it would allow two billion people to survive. In the timeline where no teams were executed, the participants who are able to shift recall their memories from previous timelines. Delta says that he ran the Decision Game to ensure his and Phi's birth, and to cause epigenetic changes in Diana and Sigma, giving Phi the ability to shift and Delta the ability to read minds and briefly control others' bodies.

The participants activate the "force quit box" in the lounge, starting the facility's self-destruct sequence. Akane realizes that the impending danger and the resonance of the gathered shifters would allow the participants to shift to the timeline where they won the coin toss and were freed. After shifting, they threaten to call the police on Delta, but he points out that he has not committed any crimes in the current timeline. He says that there will be no Radical-6 outbreak in this timeline, meaning that mankind will go extinct, but that the participants now are determined to change the future; he says that one of his goals was to get them into this frame of mind. He gives Carlos a handgun with the choice of killing Delta or letting him live, saying that the fate of humanity is on the line. The game ends with Carlos aiming the gun.

In the epilogues, Carlos' sister recovers from an illness and also gains the ability to jump between timelines. Carlos has become a brother figure to Akane and Junpei, who are to be married, and the three of them vow to stop the religious extremist. Mira has turned herself in for her killings and married Eric, but Sean breaks her out of prison so that they can use the transporter to stop Mira from committing her murders in the past. The Phi of 1904 is speculated to have become a researcher who studied the transporter well into her 100s.

== Development ==
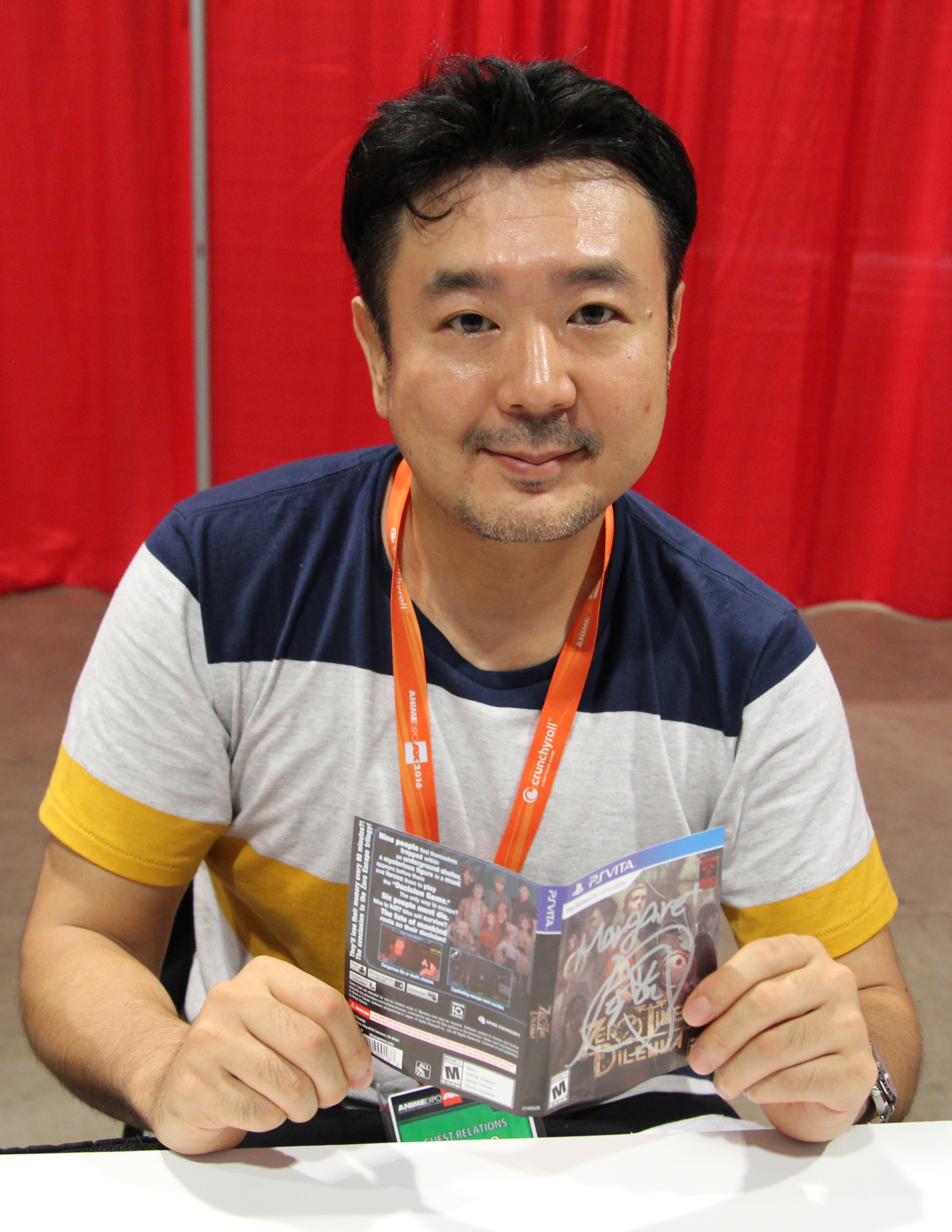
The game was directed by Kotaro Uchikoshi, who intended it to be the last entry in the series.

Zero Time Dilemma was developed by Chime, and directed and written by Kotaro Uchikoshi, with music composed by Shinji Hosoe. Uchikoshi first mentioned details of a third Zero Escape game in 2012, stating that it would be the last entry in the series; by 2013, he said that he had finished planning the story, but that development had not yet begun. In February 2014, the project was put on hold indefinitely in response to the series' poor commercial reception in Japan.

Uchikoshi examined the possibility of financing the development through the use of crowdfunding on a website like Kickstarter, but felt that the idea would not be persuasive enough for it to meet the goal; he also sought out opportunities with executives and investors. The series' fandom created Operation Bluebird, an online campaign to raise awareness of the series and support the game's development, in response to its hiatus. When delivering the pitch for the game, Uchikoshi opened with a fan-made vocal rendition of the series theme song, "Morphogenetic Sorrow"; he considered this a major point in getting the project approved. At the 2015 Anime Expo in July, Aksys Games announced that development of the third game had been resumed, citing the high demand and awareness for the game as key factors for its reevaluation. By March 2016, development was 80% finished. The porting of the game to Microsoft Windows was handled by Chime, with consultation from Abstraction Games, who had previously worked on Microsoft Windows ports for the Danganronpa series.

For the music, Uchikoshi wrote down directions about the mood and concept of the game, describing it as "sad and lonely, like a worn-out record", and "dark and visceral". Hosoe described the music as generally less melodic: because they could not make the music hit on cue like in film, they decided during the planning stage to include silence in the soundtrack, so Hosoe created atmospheric tracks to be used as background noise. Because the Nine Hours, Nine Persons, Nine Doors characters Junpei and Akane and the Virtue's Last Reward characters Sigma and Phi appear in the game, Uchikoshi decided to have arrangements of songs from those two games included in the soundtrack. He also had the songs "Digital Root" and "Trepidation", which had been used in both previous games, be included, as he saw them as a sort of theme songs that tie the games together as a series, similarly to "The Imperial March" from the Star Wars films. Hosoe received a list of what songs were to be rearranged and how they were to be used within the game, and was asked to compose a total of 45 songs; he did however end up composing nearly 70 songs, ensuring that they had something that fit every situation in the game. For the ending theme, Hosoe incorporated several callbacks to songs from the previous games as "a sendoff for the series", leading into "Morphogenetic Sorrow".

Two puzzle creators were enlisted with designing the escape-the-room scenarios; Uchikoshi described one of them as creating "orthodox" puzzles, and the other, Strider creator Kouichi Yotsui, as creating "unique and out-of-the-box" types of puzzles. He gave them a rough idea of what he wanted each puzzle to convey and how he wanted them to resolve. The puzzle designers would come up with a draft, which he would finalize together with them.

=== Story and themes ===
The game was originally planned to be developed simultaneously with the previous Zero Escape game, Virtue's Last Reward, with the two games being "paired as a set", and with Virtue's Last Reward having a cliffhanger ending. With Zero Time Dilemma, Uchikoshi intended to resolve all mysteries left from the previous game, as well as all introduced in the third, while also attempting to make the story enjoyable for first-time players. This was used as a "basic framework" to write the story within. In addition to figuring out how to explain the mysteries while avoiding contradictions with Virtue's Last Reward, they added side stories to the narrative to give it "a little extra punch". They also took the time-travel ability some characters in Virtue's Last Reward have into consideration, as it opened up for more narrative possibilities. Uchikoshi worked with two other writers; the three helped each other come up with ideas and figure out the best ways to make the story work. When coming up with the story, he knew from the start that he wanted Sigma, Phi and Diana to be on one team, and Akane on another; this left open slots in the teams, which were filled with other characters as story development progressed. The script took one year to write. While Uchikoshi had already had an idea for the setting and events of Zero Time Dilemma when writing Virtue's Last Reward, the game structure changed when the time came to implement it. One reason was that characters "take on a life of their own and make their own decisions" when he writes from their point of view, and that characters might pull the story in a different direction than he had originally planned; most of the time, he would let the story go where the characters want to go rather than forcing it to follow his original plans, leading to changes in story and structure. The budget partly dictated the game's setting in an enclosed space as it required few art assets to develop.

The game's main theme is morality, and it is the game in the series with the largest focus on philosophy; Uchikoshi intends to have the player's "way of thinking, values, [and] virtues" shaken intensely while they play the game. The "dilemma" in the game's title reflects this, as the game asks the player whether choices they make are the right thing to do. Another main theme is identity, and how people try to figure out who they are. This came from Uchikoshi's personal struggles with identity issues: he said that he is "always thinking about who [he is]" and that he thinks he might have a multifaceted personality; his characters, like him, deal with this issue. Among other major themes are "multiple-probability histories", with the player being able to move between different equally probable histories depending on the choices they have made; and the big effects small coincidences can have, which was reflected in the use of randomizing events. The idea to include randomization came from how Uchikoshi wanted to "spoiler-proof" the game, and felt that FAQ websites that tell players how to beat the game make playthroughs uninteresting. He had always been fascinated by the concept of coincidences, and how actions done in the past lead up "where we are today", so he did a lot of research and reading on the topic to prepare writing the story. The theme of no absolute good or evil came from Buddhist literature Uchikoshi had read, particularly the Zen Buddhist idea of "shiki soku zeku", which he described as "matter is void and form is emptiness". Because of this idea, Uchikoshi tried to give each character "their own sense of personal justice that they believe to be true", resulting in characters with different philosophies who play off each other.

While previous Zero Escape titles tell their narratives through visual novel segments, Zero Time Dilemma replaces them with cinema scenes, intended to feel familiar for Western players and "emulate the feel of a big-budget American TV show". To further this effect, the option to turn off the subtitles was included. Due to this more cinematic approach, Uchikoshi was able to make use of his experience with writing the anime series Punch Line (2015). The inspirations for the change in format were Telltale Games' adventure game series The Walking Dead (2012–2019) and Level-5's adventure game Time Travelers (2012). Uchikoshi said that this would make for a lower barrier of entry for people not necessarily interested in visual novels, and that mass appeal is important to Spike Chunsoft, as just a Japanese audience is not enough for the production of adventure games. The non-linear and episodic nature of the game's chapters was done to appeal to more casual players and people new to the series, as they can uncover the story at their own pace without being "railroaded into doing one storyline from start to finish". The use of fragments added some challenge to writing the story: Uchikoshi had to be careful when planning the progression of the story, as changes to one fragment would also affect the fragments surrounding it. When breaking the story up into fragments, he considered what would be the most entertaining for players.

In response to feedback from players, Zero Time Dilemma was intended to be more suspenseful than Virtue's Last Reward: Uchikoshi and the game's producer decided that, as Zero Time Dilemma is the final Zero Escape game, they should no longer hold back and instead do what they had always wanted to do. Because of the life-and-death theme, they felt that there would be less of an impact if they had held back, and that they instead should make the violence in the game "extreme" to make the player's choices hit home. According to Uchikoshi, the development team wanted the player to feel worried, and that the game would be done as he wants it without any changes done for the sake of age ratings: they had originally considered aiming for a CERO D age rating – 17 years or older – but decided to aim for a Z age rating instead, which is the highest age rating in Japan, as they felt they could not get the visual and emotional impact they wanted within a D rating. Despite this, CERO ended up assigning the game a D rating.

=== Character design ===
The game's characters were designed by Rui Tomono; Uchikoshi had considered asking Kinu Nishimura, the character designer for the previous two games in the series, to return, but wanted to show that the series had changed significantly. He also felt that, as the production had moved from backgrounds and drawn characters to 3D cinematics, "more impressive design" was needed, and that Tomono's designs were likely to be accepted internationally while still feeling Japanese. Some character designs had to be changed due to technical difficulties with the 3D models: the baggy sleeves of Akane's dress were made tighter; Junpei's jacket was removed; and asymmetrical aspects of Eric's design were removed.

Zero's character design was changed to suit the story's focus on a virus; the character wears a plague doctor mask as opposed to the gas mask worn in the previous games. Carlos was designed to clearly communicate his occupation as a firefighter: he was given scars on his arms, a tight t-shirt and shirt to help show off his muscular build and silhouette, and an axe embroidery on his shirt pocket. Because Akane is Japanese, her design incorporated Japanese elements such as the use of straight lines on her top and a belt to emulate the look of a kimono and a kimono sash. The black color of the belt was meant to represent her hidden dark side, while the belt chains represented things that constrict her. The top halves of her sleeves were initially going to be pastel purple to make sure that the design was not too dark and that it contrasted against Junpei's more monochromatic design; this was changed for the final model, however, with Tomono noting that the use of purple might be better for a mentally unstable character. Similarly, Akane was given blue accents to contrast against Junpei's reds. Junpei was redesigned to fit his jaded personality in Zero Time Dilemma as his previous design in Nine Hours, Nine Persons, Nine Doors felt "childish" and clashing. His design process was difficult, with the development team going through many design proposals.

Sean was originally meant to wear a cubic helmet, but Tomono presented a spherical design instead, which Uchikoshi described as "everything I didn't know I wanted". Mira was designed to continue the series tradition of having a "sexy femme fatale" character in each game: she was given an open track jacket and a bikini-like top to show off her cleavage, and a jiggle effect was added to her 3D model. Eric's design and 3D modelling went smoothly, with Chime saying that some faces are easier to model than others. Tomono wanted him to specifically have a Caucasian chin and brow, but noted that they had to be careful to not go too far with it, to avoid a too realistic look. Diana's design was difficult to recreate in 3D, with the initial model having "really chubby chipmunk cheeks", but was worked on until it matched the design. She was also difficult to animate, due to her long skirt. Phi was originally shorter and had bigger eyes, but after she was given glasses, it was decided that she should look more like a model to match the stylish look of her short hair and glasses. Parts of Sigma's design from Virtue's Last Reward were incorporated into his new one, in the form of embroidery on his polo shirt.

== Promotion and release ==
In March 2015, Aksys Games launched the website 4infinity.co, which consisted of a countdown timer; the countdown ended in July, coinciding with the game's announcement at Anime Expo. The game's title and logo were revealed in October, and in December, a teaser Twitter account was launched, revealing artwork of characters from the game. The game was unveiled during a presentation in March 2016. The Japanese release uses the English series title, Zero Escape, instead of the Kyokugen Dasshutsu (極限脱出; "Extreme Escape") title used for previous Japanese releases, as the developers wanted to renew the series' image and bring over the Western title to Japan.

Unlike previous Zero Escape games, the game was localized alongside the production of the Japanese version: it was published by Aksys Games for the Nintendo 3DS and PlayStation Vita in North America and Europe on June 28, 2016, with a Japanese release following on June 30. A Microsoft Windows version was released worldwide by Spike Chunsoft on June 30. The game was released digitally and physically on the Nintendo 3DS and the PlayStation Vita in North America, and digitally only in Europe. The PlayStation Vita version is compatible with the PlayStation TV. The Nintendo 3DS version does not support the system's stereoscopic 3D effect. A PlayStation 4 version with improved lighting and shading was released in Japan on August 17, 2017 and in North America the following day. It was released in Europe on September 8, with Rising Star Games assisting Aksys Games by distributing the retail copies. An Xbox One version was released on August 30, 2022.

In North America, a limited edition that includes a wristwatch was released. Because the watches were damaged in transit, they were delayed and sent separately from the game. Japanese pre-ordered copies came bundled with the 48-page Zero Escape: Premium Booklet, which includes production material, illustrations by Tomono, summaries of the previous two Zero Escape games, and a prequel written by Uchikoshi; a digital edition of the booklet was bundled with the Microsoft Windows release, together with a portion of the game's soundtrack. Aksys plans to release the booklet separately from the game, and is also considering releasing other merchandise based on the game. According to Hosoe, his company, Supersweep, which published the soundtrack albums for the previous games, is considering publishing an album for Zero Time Dilemma too.

== Reception ==
Reception

Aggregate score
Aggregator	Score
Metacritic	83/100 (Vita); 81/100 (3DS); 80/100 (PS4); 78/100 (Win)

Review scores
Publication	Score
Destructoid	9.5/10
Electronic Gaming Monthly	9/10
Famitsu	8/10, 8/10, 8/10, 8/10
Game Informer	8.75/10
GamesRadar+	4/5
IGN	9.2/10
Nintendo World Report	7.5/10
Polygon	8/10

Zero Time Dilemma was well received by critics on all platforms, and was the second-best reviewed PlayStation Vita game of 2016 on Metacritic, after Steins;Gate 0. During its opening week in Japan, it sold 5,375 copies on the PlayStation Vita and 3,916 copies on the Nintendo 3DS, for a total of 9,291 copies sold. It was the third best selling digital PlayStation Vita game of June 2016 in Europe, despite being released three days before the end of the month. The Steam release had an estimated total of 38,000 players by July 2018.

Famitsu's four reviewers enjoyed the game's setup of three different teams and non-chronological plot progression, with the player getting a greater understanding of the story as they play; one of them said that learning what was going on in the fragments was "fantastic", and that they liked the emphasis on "interpersonal human drama". Another of them commented that the "light banter" dialogue is helpful in motivating the player. One of them said that the game would be enjoyable even for players who have not played previous entries in the series.

The reviewers at Famitsu noted that the puzzle rooms were challenging and fun, but wished that the game had included a hint function for people who primarily play the game for the story; one of the reviewers also commented that the way the player uses items is difficult at some points. They appreciated how the puzzle rooms, unlike many other escape-the-room games, do not feel artificial. IGN praised the "inventive" puzzles, "stellar" storytelling, darker tone, decisions and consequences, "beautiful character moments", and "mind-bending plot".

Destructoid called the game a "hallmark of excellence" ruined only by the "abysmal presentation" of the cut scenes. One reviewer at Famitsu liked how the game allows the player to skip past already viewed cutscenes, while another commented that the cutscenes are not perfectly lip-synched to the Japanese voice acting.

The game has won or been nominated for some awards: it won Destructoid's award for the best PlayStation Vita game of 2016, Game Informer's award for the best ending in an adventure game of 2016, and RPGFan's Reader's Choice award in the adventure games and visual novels category. It was a runner-up for Hardcore Gamer's Best Story, Best Voice Acting and Best PlayStation Vita Game of 2016 awards, and was nominated for IGN's Nintendo 3DS and PlayStation Vita games of the year awards. It was selected for two of RPGFan's Editors' Awards: Peter Triezenberg ranked it as the fifth best game of the year, while Robert Fenner selected it for his Most Disappointing category; and Mira was included on Destructoid's list of their favorite new video game characters of 2016.
