= Klim (surname) =

Klim is a surname. Notable people with this surname include:

- Józef Piotr Klim (born 1960), Polish politician
- Lesley Klim, (born 1995), Namibian international rugby union player
- Michael Klim (born 1977), Polish-Australian swimmer
- Romuald Klim (1933–2011), Soviet hammer thrower

== Fictional characters ==
- Niels Klim, the protagonist of the 18th century fantasy novel Niels Klim's Underground Travels
- Sigma Klim, the protagonist of the 2012 adventure game Zero Escape: Virtue's Last Reward
