= Kinu Nishimura =

Japanese artist

- 西村 キヌ
- Born: October 5, 1969 (age 56); Hyōgo Prefecture, Japan
- Occupation: Character artist
- Years active: 1991–present
- Employer: Capcom (1991–2008)
- Notable work: Capcom's fighting games

Kinu Nishimura (Japanese: 西村 キヌ, Hepburn: Nishimura Kinu) is a Japanese video game and anime concept artist and illustrator. Currently freelance, she is best known for her character design and promotional art for Capcom's fighting games during the 1990s.

== Career ==
Kinu Nishimura began working at Capcom when she was recruited by Akiman while studying at Kyoto University of Art and Design in 1991, with her first job being Muscle Bomber, and her first major project for them being character design and illustrations for The King of Dragons. During her time at Capcom, she provided designs and art for many of their games, including the Street Fighter series (working alongside Akiman as the main illustrator for Street Fighter II and as character designer, promotional illustrator, and in-game artist for Street Fighter III and Street Fighter IV). She was the main illustrator (alongside Shinkiro) and promotional illustrator for the crossover games Capcom vs. SNK and Capcom vs. SNK 2, on which she worked for Capcom on SNK's characters. Her other work on Capcom's fighting games included the Darkstalkers series, Cyberbots: Full Metal Madness, and Rival Schools: United by Fate. She has also worked as character designer and/or promotional illustrator on such games as Armored Warriors, Cannon Spike, Dungeons & Dragons: Shadow over Mystara, Gaia Master, and Tech Romancer.

Despite Nishimura leaving Capcom in 2008, she has continued to work on some of their games as a freelancer, such as Marvel vs. Capcom 3. She also contributed new illustrations to the Street Fighter 25th and 30th anniversary art books in which she was featured prominently, and the tie-in art books for Darkstalkers Resurrection (including cover art) and Dungeons & Dragons: Chronicles of Mystara.

Outside of Capcom, she has created character designs for many other games, including the Zero Escape series by Spike Chunsoft (although succeeded by Rui Tomono in Zero Time Dilemma) and Culdcept Revolt by Nippon Ichi Software, many social mobile games, anime TV series, including Overman King Gainer, Overlord, and Sirius the Jaeger, and other productions, such as a stage show Dragon, Dance With Wolves. She was charge of the characters and the game world planning for Agatsuma Entertainment's Code of Princess, of which launch copy includes the bonus disc containing a collection of her art; the game's producer said that he wanted to create a sequel, and that Nishimura had come up with some ideas for one already.

Many of her illustrations have been printed in various Capcom and other art books, or served as doujinshi covers. Other have been adapted for figurines (including the "Kinu Nishimura Collection" of Capcom vs. SNK 2 characters and a figure collection of the Capcom characters that she had designed, such as Street Fighter's Ibuki), posters, wall scrolls, and shirts.

== Recognition ==
She is highly acclaimed and popular, both domestically and abroad. Kotaku featured her in an article series intended to celebrate the work of video game artists, and called her "one of the most accomplished artists to have ever worked in video games". Her art is one of the two stated main inspirations for the artist Da-kuro from Japanese company Gumi for their games such as Phantom of the Kill. She was also credited by Carlo Arellano, art director of video game Vainglory. The cover of a special edition of UDON's art book The UDON's Art of Capcom is a homage to her cover of Capcom Design Works.
