= Fire Force season 2 =

Fire Force
- Season 2
- Cover art for the first Blu-ray volume of the season, featuring Shinra Kusakabe (L) and Inca Kasugatani (R)
- No. of episodes: 24

Release
- Original network: JNN (MBS, TBS); BS-TBS
- Original release: July 4 – December 12, 2020

Season chronology
- ← Previous; Season 1 Next → Season 3

The second season of the Fire Force anime television series is based on the manga series Fire Force by Atsushi Ohkubo. It was announced following the broadcast of the first season finale, which was also produced by David Production. The season was directed and written by Tatsuma Minamikawa, who respectively replaced Yuki Yase and Yamato Haishima in those positions from the previous season. It aired from July 4 to December 12, 2020, on the Animeism programming block on MBS, TBS, BS-TBS, and several other JNN affiliates. (Note: MBS and TBS listed the season premiere as airing on July 3 at 25:55, which is effectively July 4 at 1:55 a.m. JST.)

The first opening theme song is "Spark-Again", performed by Aimer, while the first ending theme song is "ID", performed by Cider Girl. The second opening theme song is "Torch of Liberty", performed by Kana-Boon, while the second ending theme song is "Desire" (ディザイア), performed by Pelican Fanclub.

== Episodes ==
No. overall	No. in season	Title	Directed by (Note: Production staff information is taken from the ending credits of each episode.)	Written by	Storyboarded by	Original release date	English air date
25	1	"A Fire Soldier's Fight"; Transliteration: "Shōbō-kan no Tatakai" (Japanese: 消防官の戦い)	Tatsuma Minamikawa	Ken'ichirō Yano	Tatsuma Minamikawa	July 4, 2020	November 8, 2020
25	1	"A Man's Fight"; Transliteration: "Otoko no Tatakai" (Japanese: 男の戦い)	Tatsuma Minamikawa	Ken'ichirō Yano	Tatsuma Minamikawa	July 4, 2020	November 8, 2020
Life has returned to normal as if the past events involving the Evangelist sending the White Clad had never happened. However, Shinra is still determined to find a way to turn Infernals back into people and unravel the mystery of the Evangelist and the Adolla Bursts. At Company 8, Maki, Iris and Tamaki take Shinra shopping for clothes for Lieutenant Hinawa because of his poor dress sense. They are suddenly interrupted by a series of explosions, and when Shinra goes to investigate, he is attacked by a giant sentient Infernal that shoots balls of fire from its mouth. Arthur arrives and assists Shinra before the rest of Company 8 arrive and prepare to attack. Working together, the group temporarily defeats the Infernal but Viktor discovers that it has five separate cores within its body which must each be destroyed. The Infernal revives and the team collaborate to destroy the cores within its arms and legs while Shinra attacks and destroys the central core with his powerful "Rapid-Man Kick". Later, Captain Obi introduces Shinra to the highly competitive Fire Force annual male nude calendar project. However, their cheesy "double-cobra" pose results in Company 8's photo being relegated to last place as in the previous year.
26	2	"Flames of Madness"; Transliteration: "Kyōki no Honō" (Japanese: 狂気の炎)	Shuntarō Tozawa	Yoriko Tomita	Mamoru Kurosawa	July 11, 2020	November 15, 2020
Shinra meets Captain Soichiro Hague of Company 4 accompanied by Hague's granddaughter at the 8th, Lieutenant Asako. They are met by Instructor Purt Co Pan, who takes Shinra to Hague. Hague surprisingly asks Shinra to burn him, and Shinra is prompted by a goading of young woman's voice inside his head to use his full power. Hague reveals that he has seen the nether world through what Shinra calls the Adolla Link and wants to return, whether it is Heaven or Hell. From afar, White Clad Haumea comments to Charon that the woman known as the First Pillar continues to tempt Shinra to use his Adolla Burst. Shinra loses control, and Hague realizes the situation so he forces Shinra outside where Arthur appears and intercedes to prevent Shinra using his full power. Arthur even uses Hague's body with its Shield of Masochism to protect himself from Shinra's attacks. During the battle, Arthur recalls living with his mother and delusional father who dreamed of something greater than their poor existence and abandoned him, leaving only their blessing. The battle continues until, with the force of Arthur's attacks, Shinra rejects the provocations of the First Pillar. As she leaves his consciousness, she reveals that there is another Pillar, a potential asset to both the Evangelist and the Fire Force.
27	3	"A New Flashpoint"; Transliteration: "Aratana Hidane" (Japanese: 新たな火種)	Shō Sugawara	Yoriko Tomita	Jirō Fujimoto	July 18, 2020	November 22, 2020
Obi discusses the implications of the appearance of another Pillar with the Fire Defence Agency Chief. Meanwhile, school student Inca Kasugatani uses her uncanny ability of smell to detect the faint odour of a house that is about to burst into flames. She gathers her accomplices, Panda and Sancho, and they head to the location, preparing to burgle the property once it catches alight. She saves the aged resident, but not before relieving him of all his money. Later, the First Pillar appears to Inca, piquing her interest. Suddenly, houses in the area start bursting into flames, and Inca gleefully predicts their location like a musical conductor. As Company 8 races to the scene, Obi mentions the existence of the Fire Thief schoolgirl whom he suspects may be the Fifth Pillar. The company arrives and splits up to tackle the Infernals who are creating the fires. Shinra is assigned to find the Fire Thief and Arthur to stop the plasma-user. Haumea finds Inca and sends Charon to get her, but he carelessly kills Sancho when the youth interferes, awakening Inca's ignition abilities. Shinra arrives to prevent her being taken by the White Clad and engages Charon in a fiery battle.
28	4	"Groping Through the Fire"; Transliteration: "Kachū Mosaku" (Japanese: 火中模索)	Tetsuji Nakamura	Yoriko Tomita	Tetsuji Nakamura	July 25, 2020	December 6, 2020
Company 8 dispatches an increasing number of Infernals which Obi suspects are being created by Infernal Bugs. Shinra momentarily stops Charon and tries to convince Inca to join the Fire Force, but she refuses and runs off, seeking instead relief from her mundane existence. Meanwhile, a demon Infernal appears in addition to the large number of people infected by the Infernal Bugs, overwhelming the Fire Force. However, Obi had earlier called for assistance, and Lieutenant Karim, Toru Kishiri and Juggernaut arrive to immobilize the Infernals and fight the White Clad. Companies 2 and 5 then arrive and assist Company 8 to dispatch the remaining Infernals and evacuate the citizens. On a rooftop, Arthur attacks Haumea who has been coordinating the attack on the town. Shinra goes after Inca who has been captured by the White Clad, but she refuses to join either group. As the White Clad take Inca away, Shinra again engages Charon, but his attacks appear to have little effect. Eventually, Shinra decides to try a new technique taught to him by Obi, called the "Corna".
29	5	"Corna (Sign of the Devil)"; Transliteration: "Koruna (Akuma no Kata)" (Japanese: 悪魔の型(コルナ))	Kyōhei Suzuki	Ken'ichirō Yano	Toshiyuki Katō	August 1, 2020	December 13, 2020
29	5	"A Secret Plan"; Transliteration: "Hisaku" (Japanese: 秘策)	Kyōhei Suzuki	Ken'ichirō Yano	Toshiyuki Katō	August 1, 2020	December 13, 2020
While fighting Charon, Shinra recalls that Flam Karim said that second generation pyrokinetics cannot create fire but can control it. He suspects that Charon is one of those and tries using the Corna technique again, but the knowledge is of little use against the experienced Charon. Shinra finally manages to focus his attack and succeeds in downing Charon but not defeating him. Charon prepares to retaliate. The Fire Force has its hands full with the demon and the burning buildings. Licht suggests utilizing the power of the second generations to channel the flames into the town square where they are controlled by Maki and turned into a spiraling firestorm. Vulcan and Obi force the demon into the center of the firestorm where it is sucked into its vortex and consumed. Karim then freezes the column solid, extinguishing the flames.
30	6	"The Time to Choose"; Transliteration: "Sentaku no Toki" (Japanese: 選択の時)	Daishi Katō	Ken'ichirō Yano	Shinji Itadaki	August 8, 2020	January 3, 2021
Shinra tries to convince Inca to join him, but she decides instead to stay with the White Clad and Charon leaves Shinra badly beaten. Inca's surviving accomplice, Panda, catches up with them and demands that they let her go. When Charon goes to stop him, Inca sees what is about to happen so she engulfs Panda in flames instead, then departs with the White Clad. After the recent events, the Fire Force is left wondering how to deal with the forces against them. Following discussion with the other companies, Obi announces that Shinra, Arthur, Tamaki and Viktor will be part of a joint operation with Takeru Noto and Ogun Montgomery from other companies under the command of Purt Co Pan. Their objective is to investigate the Great Cataclysm of 250 years ago hoping to obtain insights into the Adolla Bursts and the Evangelist's motives in collecting the eight Pillars. The research will be conducted outside Tokyo Empire on the Chinese Peninsula, and the seven member team board a paddle steamer bound for China.
31	7	"Road to the Oasis"; Transliteration: "Rakuen e no Michi" (Japanese: 楽園への道)	Shuntarō Tozawa	Yoriko Tomita	Mamoru Kurosawa	August 15, 2020	January 10, 2021
The Fire Force team arrives at Avalon on the Asian mainland and Takeru Noto reunites with his mother. She reveals that someone has raided their vegetable garden while the rest of the group prepare to travel to the location of a spatial rift. As they drive inland in a covered half-track, the team, apart from Viktor who is wearing a mask, are affected by a gas escaping from cracks in the land's surface which acts like a stimulant, causing them to act erratically and recklessly. They are suddenly attacked by a giant worm-like beast and a talking mole leaps onto their vehicle for safety. Shinra and Orgun divert the worm away and they discover the mole, Scop, was responsible for raiding the Noto garden for its potatoes. Scop offers to guide them to its home, an oasis near the spatial rift which has since been taken over by invaders. Along the way, they meet Scop's friend, Yata, a talking crow, and that night the team witness a multitude of Infernals wandering the countryside. When the team arrive at the oasis, Yata shows Shinra the Tabernacle, an Amaterasu similar to the one in Tokyo Empire. Scop leads them through a forest scattered with debris of past human habitation, and they arrive at one of pillars surrounding the Tabernacle. As they approach, they are attacked by Infernal dogs associated with the invaders, but Tamaki puts them to rest. Later, Shinra hears an internal voice telling him to save the forest.
32	8	"Smoldering Malevolence"; Transliteration: "Moe Hisomu Akui" (Japanese: 燃え潜む悪意)	Ryōta Aikei	Yoriko Tomita	Ryōta Aikei	August 22, 2020	January 17, 2021
Shinra believes the internal voice came from the Tabernacle. Scop explains the history of the Tabernacle and how a young woman in black robes taught them to speak and repaired the structure. Suddenly the group are attacked by cloaked sentient Infernals who have also set booby traps in the surrounding area. An Infernal states that the Tabernacle was built to destroy the world, but this is refuted by Scop who says it has benefited them, leading Shinra to believe that an Amaterasu can be used for good or evil. Meanwhile Tempe's Infernals have completed gathering a series of tablets which he plans to use to release the Tabernacle's full power. Purt Co Pan, Viktor and Arthur enter the Tabernacle to investigate while outside Tempe leads an attack by his Infernal followers against the Fire Force. Tempe reveals his intention is to kill himself and ascend to Heaven by blowing up the Tabernacle. Because this will also destroy the forest and the surrounding region, Shinra vows to defeat Tempe who has the power of a demon. Suddenly, Shinra detects the Adolla Link as the young woman in black robes appears behind him. Meanwhile inside the Tabernacle, Purt Co Pan and Victor vainly try to decode numbers engraved on the tablets and the walls, when Arthur suddenly comes up with a solution.
33	9	"The Core"; Transliteration: "Kakushin" (Japanese: 核心)	Yūya Horiuchi	Yoriko Tomita	Hiroko Kazui	August 29, 2020	January 24, 2021
Prologue: A retelling of The Great Cataclysm describes how after the world was enveloped in flames and ash, a man, later to be called Raffles I, led his followers to an "unsullied flame", an energy source which he used to create "Amaterasu" and benefit mankind. Back inside the Tabernacle Amaterasu, Viktor tests Arthur's hypothesis that the code is based on "pi", but the results are inconclusive. They continue forward and reach the entrance to the core which emits a mechanical sound like a heartbeat. From the presence of white-feathered arrows, including one in the keyhole, Viktor deduces that the core involves a sacrifice and may contain a living being possessing an Adolla Burst. Outside, Shinra and the others fight off the Infernals until only Tempe remains. Tempe creates a flaming scythe and attacks the Fire Force who seem powerless against him. Shinra still hears the voice telling him to save the forest so he asks Ogun, Tamaki and Takeru to delay Tempe while he and Scop attempt to contact the woman in black robes. He is finally successful, but she is so weak that she can only provide one second of Adolla Grace to help him. Shinra believes that will be just enough for him to defeat Tempe.
34	10	"The Woman in Black"; Transliteration: "Kuro no On'na" (Japanese: 黒の女)	Tetsuji Nakamura	Ken'ichirō Yano	Tetsuji Nakamura	September 5, 2020	January 31, 2021
Shinra accepts the offer of one second of Adolla Grace from the woman in black. He uses it in an attack on Tempe and finds that his body travels at light speed causing time to run backwards. He sees back to the time when Tempe survived the Great Cataclysm but found himself alone. It was then that the Evangelist emerged from the Spatial Rift and used a fire bug to turn Tempe into an Infernal Demon. In real time, Shinra's attack takes only an instant and he destroys Tempe in a massive burst of flame some distance from the forest. The woman in black then communicates to Shinra that she was enkindled with an Adolla Burst by an Evangelist insect, and then used her energy to create the oasis for the animals. The Fire Force team reunite and share their information, deducing that the Amaterasu in Tokyo, controlled by the Holy Sol Temple and Haijima, is also probably powered by a human, but who was an unwilling sacrifice and now resents humanity. Also they suspect that the Evangelist plans to sacrifice the eight Pillars and use Amaterasu to kick start a second Great Cataclysm. Having completed their mission, the Fire Force team head back to the Tokyo Empire and report to Captain Obi.
35	11	"Dark Hero"; Transliteration: "Dāku Hīrō" (Japanese: ダークヒーロー)	Jun'ichirō Hashiguchi	Ken'ichirō Yano	Katsumi Terahigashi	September 12, 2020	February 7, 2021
The Fire Force team report their discoveries to Captain Obi. They explain the connections between Amaterasu and the Adolla Burst, which draws into question the teachings of the Holy Sol Temple and implies a connection with the Evangelist. Meanwhile, in his search for the truth, Viktor solves the numerical codes from the Tabernacle and realizes Arthur's theory was correct. Later, Company 8 are frustrated when Obi reports that Fire Force headquarters have recommended that they take no action for three years while the church assesses the information. Joker asks the proto-nationalist Benimaru Shinmon if he will go against the Holy Sol Temple to discover the truth about what they are hiding and Shinmon surprisingly agrees. As Joker and Shinmon prepare their strategy outside the Imperial Seat, headquarters of the empire, the current ruler of the Tokyo Empire Raffles III is advised that the residents of Asakusa still reject Amaterasu but the cardinals have advised against provoking Shinmon, also known as the Destroyer God. Joker and Shinmon stage a frontal attack on the Imperial Seat, but after an initial success, Shinmon collapses, felled by an invisible attack from a huge Holy Sol defender.
36	12	"Shadows Cast by Divine Light"; Transliteration: "Shinkō ga Umu Kage" (Japanese: 神光が生む影)	Shuntarō Tozawa	Yoriko Tomita	Yasufumi Soejima	September 19, 2020	February 14, 2021
Shinmon recovers from the poison fired into his body by the Holy Sol defender through his resistance to toxins and together with Joker they defeat the remaining Holy Sol defenders. They enter the church and Joker exposes a hidden trapdoor to the levels below with access to the forbidden Nether. As Shinmon pressures Joker to explain how he knows so much about the operations of the Holy Sol, they are soon surrounded by masked Holy Sol Shadows, the Temple's secret assassination team. Joker reveals that he is the former Holy Sol Shadow known only as Five-Two. A flashback shows how the promising young "orphan of god", Five-Two, is physically beaten into submission, but he never surrendered to their collective philosophy. He escaped, but the family who found and fed him were slaughtered as a warning. Back in the present, Joker takes on the Shadow commander who draws his retractable zig-zag whip-sword, leaving Shinmon to fight the other Shadows. The commander forces Joker to play his full pack of 52 cards, and then prepares to kill his former pupil. However, Joker has been emitting a hallucinogenic smoke from his cigarettes which confuses the commander long enough for Joker to cut him to pieces. Joker is finally left with only his trump card, the joker, as Commander Burns ominously emerges from the shadows.
37	13	"A Pair of One-Eyes"; Transliteration: "Tai no Sekigan" (Japanese: 対の隻眼)	Daisuke Chiba	Yoriko Tomita	Jirō Fujimoto	September 26, 2020	February 21, 2021
Commander Burns and Joker discuss the time they experienced the Adolla Link, transported to a different dimension where each lost an eye and Joker brought back a purple flaming stone. Burns hands Joker the notebook of the wife of Raffles I, which after years of investigation, he believes is the only document detailing events of the Great Catastrophe and foundation of the Tokyo Empire. It describes the discovery of the Adolla Burst and creation of the Amaterasu. However, she wrote that Raffles appeared to be a different person on his return, indicating that the Holy Sol Temple may have been set up by an inhuman who had taken Raffles' place. Meanwhile, Yona reveals to other Knights of the Ashen Flame that he impersonated Raffles I and created the Holy Sol Temple on orders of the Evangelist. Joker then turns his attention to Haijima Industries which he believes must be linked to the Evangelist. At Company 8, Lisa arrives on her release from hospital and they all learn about the outcomes of Shinmon and Joker's investigation. Viktor is called into Haijima Industries following his report on the Chinese Peninsula expedition. He meets company president, Gureo Haijima who asks Victor to bring Shinra to them. After Viktor leaves, Haijima orders that he be eliminated because he has learned too much.
38	14	"The Ashen Reaper"; Transliteration: "Hai no Shinigami" (Japanese: 灰の死神)	Daishi Katō	Ken'ichirō Yano	Shinji Itadaki	October 3, 2020	February 28, 2021
Viktor reveals to Company 8 that he is a Haijima spy, but they already know this. He divulges Haijima's plan to capture Shinra which Viktor sees as an opportunity to further investigate their link to the Evangelist. Shinra agrees to accompany Viktor to Haijima, while Company 8 prepares to back him up. Meanwhile at Haijima Industries, experiments on promising children continue, this time with Nataku Son who was ignited by Rekka Hoshimiya's insect. Nataku is forced to fight Yūichirō Kurono who calls himself Uncle Reaper, and the boy is easily defeated. On his way to Haijima' facility, Shinra recalls his bitter experience with the bully Kurono when he was held at Haijima Industries from the ages of 7 to 12. Shinra enters the facility and feels a connection to Nataku through the Adolla Link as he is led into a training room to face Kurono. Kurono attacks Shinra with Black Smoke which Kurono uses to conceal his movements while using it to detect Shira's location and avoid counter attacks. Kurono then solidifies the smoke into sharp weapons and objects to press his attack on Shinra. With Shinra apparently defeated, the technicians call an end to the experiment, but Kurono refuses to stop, relishing his dominance over someone he perceives to be a weaker foe.
39	15	"A Three-Way Melee"; Transliteration: "San-Shoku Konsen" (Japanese: 三色混戦)	Shō Sugawara	Ken'ichirō Yano	Mamoru Kurosawa	October 10, 2020	March 7, 2021
While Viktor is at the Haijima research facility, he realizes that Nataku's Adolla Burst has been awakened. He releases Shira from the training room and together they search for Nataku while Company 8 race to their rescue in their "Matchbox". They encounter a small, but powerful mech called a Dominion, controlled by Puppeteer. Maki and Vulcan combine their powers to defeat one Dominion, but Puppeteer has the ability to create more. Meanwhile, Kurono has hold of Nataku and seeks out the weakest of Company 8 to destroy, but he is thwarted by the intervention of Arthur and Shinra. The White Clad watch these events unfold, and Charon intercepts Kurono so that they can capture Nataku. Haumea also becomes involved in the three way battle and destroys all of Puppeteer's Dominions, provoking Puppeteer to call out her massive punisher, Dominion, to fight Haumea.
40	16	"Mind Blown"; Transliteration: "Bakuhatsu Suru Kokoro" (Japanese: 爆発する心)	Jun'ichirō Hashiguchi	Ken'ichirō Yano	Jun'ichirō Hashiguchi	October 17, 2020	March 14, 2021
Puppeteer directs Dominion to attack Haumea while Maki turns her attention to Haumea's protector Arrow, and almost defeats her. Haumea is incensed and almost electrocutes Arrow, demanding better support. Meanwhile, Kurono becomes bored fighting Arthur and Shinra as they are strong opponents and he uses his Black Smoke to kill the hapless White Clad holding Nataku. A three-way tag team battle develops in an effort to capture the boy, almost like a basketball game. Ritsu creates an infernal with a bug and then uses her Necro Pyro power to raise the charred bodies of the White Clad and create a giant Infernal which incorporates Nataku into its body. Gureo Haijima orders Kurono to retrieve Nataku and so he offers to work with Shinra to do it. However, Haumea sends an electric pulse into Nataku, increasing his level of dopamine and beta-endorphins. This causes his Infected Imagination, overloading his mind and Nataku starts randomly firing beams of radioactive energy. Vulcan drives to the scene in a Morgan 3-Wheeler with Arthur to stop him and Vulcan convinces Arthur to plunge his sword into the Matchbox, creating a plasma wave which breaks Haumea's control over Nataku. Haumea goes to stop Arthur while Shinra prepares to rescue Nataku and Kurono wonders if he should seek another, easier job.
41	17	"Boys, Be Weak"; Transliteration: "Shōnen'yo, Yowaku Are" (Japanese: 少年よ、弱くあれ)	Ryōta Aikei	Yoriko Tomita	Ryōta Aikei	October 24, 2020	March 21, 2021
Shinra attacks the giant Infernal containing Nataku and uses the Adolla Link to trigger the young boy's memories. Nataku recalls his mother's oppressive expectations for him to excel, and the similar pressure he felt from Kurono in the Haijima research facility. Nataku resents these feelings and increases the intensity of his radiation, firing a mighty blast which threatens to destroy the entire region. However, it is intercepted by Charon who first absorbs and then redirects the blast towards the Moon. Meanwhile, Kurono fears that Nataku is becoming too strong and creates a huge katana from black smoke which he uses to cut the Infernal to pieces and extracts Nataku. He tells the boy to stay weak and able to be bullied, releasing Nataku from his mother's unreasonable expectations. On Charon's command, the White Clad withdraw, leaving Nataku to Haijima under Kurono's care. Company 8 has a meeting with President Gureo Haijima who casually admits that he knows Amaterasu is powered by a human which is why Haijima are seeking a person possessing the Adolla Burst to create another version. Vulcan interrupts and announces that he can design a unit which does not require a human power source. Haijima agrees to fund it in return for ownership and even offers to help Company 8 in its quest against the Evangelist who poses a threat to Haijima's profitability.
42	18	"The Holy Woman's Anguish"; Transliteration: "Seijo no Kunō" (Japanese: 聖女の苦悩)	Makoto Katō	Yoriko Tomita	Makoto Katō	October 31, 2020	March 28, 2021
42	18	"The Man, Assault"; Transliteration: "Otoko, Asaruto" (Japanese: 男、突撃(アサルト))	Makoto Katō	Yoriko Tomita	Makoto Katō	October 31, 2020	March 28, 2021
Company 8 returns to the business of fighting Infernals, but Sister Iris needs to baptize a new batch of equipment, and Shinra offers to accompany her to the Tokyo Empire Chou-ku Central Church, known as the Baptism Church. He encounters Lieutenant Hou Yan who reminds him of the need for faith in society. Iris takes him to the National Holy Sol Cemetery where clergy are buried and she reveals her doubts about the value of the church if it really was created by the Evangelist. Suddenly a priest bursts into flame and Shinra puts him to rest. Iris blesses him, but another sister questions why God allowed such a devout man to become an Infernal. Shinra eventually restores Iris' faith by reminding her that the Sun is beyond the Evangelist and the church. Since Assault's defeat by Tamaki Kotatsu when he was distracted by her semi-naked body, he has put himself through rigorous training to desensitize himself to the female form. The ruthless assassin challenges Tamaki to a duel, but the sight of her underwear is too much of a distraction and he is defeated. He returns to his training to overcome his weakness towards women and their underwear, and tries twice more to defeat her. At the third attempt, he launches an all-out attack but he suspects that he may never win.
43	19	"The Oze Family"; Transliteration: "Oze Ichimon" (Japanese: 尾瀬一門)	Tetsuji Nakamura	Ken'ichirō Yano	Tetsuji Nakamura	November 7, 2020	April 4, 2021
Maki has a rare dinner at the Oze family home with her mother, Madoka, her father, General Danro, and her brother Tagaki. After dinner, they discuss the situation within the Nether, where strange smells have been emanating lately. The following day, Tagaki and his partner investigate together, descending into one of the dark underground tunnels. They follow fresh tracks and reach an equipment room which appears to be a White Clad lab containing jars of live Infernal bugs. Suddenly, a White Clad appears wearing a bomb belt and detonates it. The explosion blows the two investigators backwards, although Tagaki takes the brunt of the blast and they are both taken to the hospital. Following the injury to his son, General Oze decides that the military must intervene in the activities of the Evangelist. He commissions Commander Honda of Company 2 to investigate the Nether and Honda requests the assistance of Company 8. However, Maki is ordered to return to the military by her father for her safety and she reluctantly complies. Viktor suggests simultaneous incursions into the Nether to catch the White Clad unawares. Because of their prior experience, one Company 8 member is assigned to accompany each of the Company 2 units to carry out the investigation.
44	20	"Weapon of Destruction"; Transliteration: "Hakai Heiki" (Japanese: 破壊兵器)	Jun'ichirō Hashiguchi	Ken'ichirō Yano	Jun'ichirō Hashiguchi	November 14, 2020	April 11, 2021
At 8am, the Company 2 Fire Force units enter the Nether simultaneously; Shinra with the Hebio Squad, Arthur with the Heckler Squad, Hinawa with the Engo Squad which is joined by Takigi Oze from CID, Tamaki with the Kagenashi Squad, and Viktor with the Ohana Squad. The Kagenashi Squad are hit by an explosion, and the Ohana Squad encounter Ritsu, a Knight of the Purple Haze who commands a large group of Infernals reanimated from bodies left behind during the Great Cataclysm. The squad takes a number of casualties which Ritsu then adds to her assault on the surviving members, leaving only Viktor who escapes with his life. Meanwhile, Platoon Leader Amon Hajiki of the Kagenashi Squad uses his heat-seeking eyes and shooting skills to destroy all the Infernals attacking their squad, however he is suddenly killed by the Medusa Whip-wielding Orochi of the Purple Haze. Orochi attacks Tamaki, but although her flame-based whip can only cut Tamaki superficially, she slowly gains the upper hand. The shy Juggernaut overcomes his fears and attacks Orochi to save Tamaki, but the Purple Haze knight uses her Medusa Whip for both defence and attack. She slices at the oversized uniform of Juggernaut, cutting into his body, but he eventually finds his strength as a weapon of destruction and launches a massive bomb of fire at close range which destroys Orochi and avenges Hajiki.
45	21	"Enemy Contact"; Transliteration: "Setteki" (Japanese: 接敵)	Shō Sugawara	Yoriko Tomita	Katsumi Terahigashi	November 21, 2020	April 18, 2021
Following the destruction of Orochi, Juggernaut lies badly wounded from her attacks and cannot move. Tamaki sends the remaining Infernals to their rest, but is then attacked by two more Purple Haze knights. Fortunately she is saved by the arrival of Gustav Honda and Captain Obi. Meanwhile, Hinawa and Oze come under attack by Iron, another Knight of the Purple Haze, who uses his fire abilities to harden the iron in his body to the steely hardness of martensite. While Oze deflects Iron's flames, Hinawa keeps shooting at Iron's vulnerable joints and they eventually defeat him. Elsewhere, Shinra is attacked by Dr. Giovanni who reveals that the White Clad lab they found was a trap laid to lure the Fire Force into the Nether so they could be defeated. Giovanni has genetically transformed his body using Adolla to incorporate the features of insects and begins attacking Shinra until Arthur joins him. Back with Tamaki, Obi takes out the first knight, Sasori, and Honda head-butts the second knight into a wall. Licht finds them and deduces from the distribution of Infernals that the White Knights intend to destroy the underground Nether facilities, so Honda orders the withdrawal of the surviving Fire Force. Meanwhile, the White Knight, Ritsu, absorbs the additional power of the dead Fire Soldiers who have become Infernals and prepares to destroy the Nether, collapsing the Tokyo Empire into the ground.
46	22	"Plot for Extinction"; Transliteration: "Metsubō no Takurami" (Japanese: 滅亡の企み)	Ryōta Aikei	Yoriko Tomita	Yasufumi Soejima	November 28, 2020	April 25, 2021
Shinra and Arthur continue their battle with Dr. Giovanni who uses his new insect ability to predict their moves. When Shinra reveals that he heard Giovanni's voice in his head, Giovanni explains that it can only happen via an Adolla Link, and Shinra recalls that it happened once with Lieutenant Konro. Meanwhile, Licht explains to Commander Honda that the Evangelist plans to destroy the center of the Tokyo Empire by exploding Infernals which have been strategically arranged within the Nether. He suggests that Maki may have the power to redirect the blast even though they may all be incinerated underground. Maki prepares for the challenge, against the objections of her brother Takigi Oze who states that as a girl she is too frail. Ritsu commences the explosions of the Infernals, and Maki and Takigi collaborate to redirect the flames to the lower levels of the Nether through narrow passageways, neutralizing them. Dr. Giovanni is surprised when the explosion is foiled, but escapes by transforming into a myriad of insects even after Arthur severs his head. The Fire Force survivors return to the surface and Honda acknowledges the effort of Company 8, stating that the Fire Force and military must unite to defeat the Evangelist. Maki happily returns to Company 8, with the grudging acceptance of her brother and father, General Oze.
47	23	"Firecat"; Transliteration: "En'byō" (Japanese: 炎猫(えんびょう))	Shuntarō Tozawa	Ken'ichirō Yano	Mamoru Kurosawa	December 5, 2020	May 2, 2021
Shinra and Captain Hibana visit Lieutenant Konro at the 7th to discuss his possible connection via an Adolla Link. They arrive and find him being attacked by a White Clad, but Konro kills him with a katana, avoiding the use of fire because of his tephrosis. Konro then explains that he experienced Adolla two years earlier when he fought a demon which seemed like a doppelganger of himself. The demon gave him a telltale scar and caused his tephrosis when he destroyed it using the 'hysterical strength' of his fight-or-flight response. Shinmon determines that Shinra has improved his fighting skills, and offers to teach him how to access this strength. Later, Shinra, Arthur and Tamaki visit him for the lesson and he begins to test the two boys by fire. However, he assigns Tamaki to see if she can deal with the twin sisters Hikage and Hinata who decide on a game of tag. Tamaki initially does not treat the game seriously, but after being initially beaten by the sisters, she draws on her resolve to push her 'Nekomata' ability to become a 'Firecat' and beat them. Shinmon praises her for peeling away her layer of self-restraint, however he is taken aback by the peeling away of her clothes as part of her 'Lucky Lecher Lure Syndrome'.
48	24	"Signs of Upheaval"; Transliteration: "Gekidō no Kizashi" (Japanese: 激動の兆し)	Tatsuma Minamikawa	Ken'ichirō Yano	Tatsuma Minamikawa	December 12, 2020	May 9, 2021
Shinra and Arthur undergo intense endurance training, a series of proto-nationalist hazings which pushes their bodies to unleash their Hysterical Strength. Shinmon goads them into a fight, but after five hours of intense combat Shinra has exhausted almost all the oxygen in his body and he enters a semi-conscious state facing death. However, his survival instinct kicks in and experiences an Adolla Link, covering him in blue flames. Meanwhile, Konro is visited by Hibana and Company 6 Captain Kayoko Huang, who examines him and determines that an Adolla Link is still present in those bearing a scar from their contact with Adolla. Assuming the White Clad is attacking other marked ones, Hibana prepares to warn Captain Hague but he is killed in his office by a White Clad called a Destroyer with a golden hand. Meanwhile, Shinra sees his mother, Sho and Hague's death through his Adolla Link. These events prompt Shinmon to unite the 7th with the rest of the empire, while the 8th and their new Fire Force allies prepare for the upcoming war with the Evangelist. The Knights of the Ashen Flame overlook the city and prepare for a final assault on the Tokyo Empire.

== Home media release ==
=== Japanese ===
DMM.com (Japan – Region 2/A)
Vol.	Episodes		Artwork		Release date		Ref.	
Vol.	Blu-ray	DVD	Blu-ray	DVD	Blu-ray	DVD	BD	DVD
1	1–6	1–3	Shinra Kusakabe and Inca Kasugatani	Shinra Kusakabe	September 30, 2020	September 30, 2020		
2	7–12	4–6	Joker and Benimaru Shinmon	Arthur Boyle	October 28, 2020	September 30, 2020		
3	13–18	7–9	Charon, Yūichirō Kurono, Nataku Son and Akitaru Ōbi	Iris	December 23, 2020	October 28, 2020		
4	19–24	10–12	Shinra Kusakabe, Arthur Boyle and Haumea	Maki Oze	January 27, 2021	October 28, 2020		
5	—	13–15	—	Tamaki Kotatsu	—	December 23, 2020	—	
6	—	16–18	—	Viktor Licht and Vulcan Joseph	—	December 23, 2020	—	
7	—	19–21	—	Takehisa Hinawa	—	January 27, 2021	—	
8	—	22–24	—	Akitaru Ōbi	—	January 27, 2021	—	

=== English ===
Crunchyroll, LLC (North America – Region 1/A)
Part	Episodes	Release date	Ref.
1	1–12	August 3, 2021	
2	13–24	November 2, 2021	
