= Fire Force season 3 =

Fire Force
- Season 3
- Cover art for the first Blu-ray volume of the season, featuring Shinra Kusakabe
- No. of episodes: 25

Release
- Original network: MBS, TBS, CBC, BS-TBS
- Original release: April 5, 2025 – April 4, 2026

Season chronology
- ← Previous; Season 2

The third and final season of the Fire Force anime television series is based on the manga series Fire Force by Atsushi Ohkubo. It was announced in May 2022. The season is produced by David Production and directed by Tatsuma Minamikawa, with Sei Tsuguta replacing the former as series composition writer. In July 2024 at Anime Expo, it was announced that the third season would also be its final and run in two split cours. The first cours aired from April 5 to June 21, 2025, (Note: MBS, TBS and CBC listed the season premiere as airing on April 4 at 25:53, which is effectively April 5 at 1:53 a.m. JST.) while the second cours aired from January 10 to April 4, 2026. (Note: MBS, TBS and CBC listed the second cours premiere as airing on January 9 at 25:53, which is effectively January 10 at 1:53 a.m. JST.) The season was broadcast on the Animeism programming block on MBS, TBS and CBC. BS-TBS aired the season nationwide in areas where its JNN affiliate was not carrying the first-run broadcast.

For the first cours, the opening theme song is "High Flame" (強火, Tsuyobi), performed by Queen Bee, while the ending theme song is "Urusiren" (ウルサイレン), performed by Umeda Cypher. For the second cours, opening theme song is "Ignis" (イグニス), performed by Takanori Nishikawa, while the ending theme song is "Speak of the Devil", performed by Survive Said the Prophet featuring Coldrain frontman Masato Hayakawa, except for the last episode, whose ending was "Bakusō Yume Uta" (爆走夢歌) by Soul'd Out's Diggy-Mo, which was also the third ending for the Soul Eater anime series.

== Episodes ==
Note: All episodes from this season were written by Sei Tsuguta.

=== Part 1 ===
| No. overall | No. in season | Title | Directed by (Note: Production staff information is taken from the ending credits of each episode.) | Storyboarded by | Original release date |
|---|---|---|---|---|---|
| 49 | 1 | "Indomitable Resolve"; Transliteration: "Futaiten" (Japanese: 不退転) | Tatsuma Minamikawa | Tatsuma Minamikawa | April 5, 2025 |
Raffles III calls Captain Burns to the Curia in the Special Fire Grand Cathedral and informs him that the empire will unite with the White Clad. Burns is horrified when Haumea explains that the White-Clad's aim is to turn the watery planet into a sun engulfed in flames, but after seeing the Evangelist, he surprisingly falls to his knees and accepts her proposal. Back at Company 8, Lieutenant Takehisa Hinawa suspects that the White-Clad are after Shinra and his Adolla Burst. He volunteers to go alone to rescue the Captain but the rest of Company 8 volunteer to join him, all realizing that this means going against the Tokyo Empire.
| 50 | 2 | "Prisoner"; Transliteration: "Toraware no Mi" (Japanese: 囚われの身) | Eiichi Kuboyama | Eiichi Kuboyama | April 12, 2025 |
Captain Obi is arrested by the Imperial Army and Company 8 are declared outlaws. Shinra has a vision via an Adolla Link in which Captain Burns reveals that Obi will be implanted with a 'Mushi' (蟲, bug), an insect that originates from Adolla which can cause spontaneous combustion in humans. Viktor Licht takes Company 8 to meet Joker, an experienced outlaw who will teach them to "walk in the darkness" and leads them to his underground hideout. Joker reveals that Obi is being held in the high security Fuchu Penitentiary and takes Shinra with him to rescue their Captain. Meanwhile in Fuchu, White-Clad member Gold prepares to expose Obi to an Adolla bug.
| 51 | 3 | "Incarnation of Flame"; Transliteration: "Honō no Keshin" (Japanese: 炎の化身) | Daisuke Chiba | Jirō Fujimoto | April 19, 2025 |
Shinra and Joker break into Fuchu Penitentiary but are confronted by Captain Burns. They attempt a frontal attack but are beaten back by Burns' Voltage Nova blast. Meanwhile, Company 8 breach the wall of the prison, only to be stopped by a White-Clad member named Gold. Maki offers to engage her while the others search for Obi, but they are beaten back and forced to regroup.
| 52 | 4 | "Golden Secret"; Transliteration: "Ōgon no Himitsu" (Japanese: 黄金の秘密) | Fumihiro Ueno | Shinji Itadaki | April 26, 2025 |
Tamaki, aided by Maki, Lisa, and Vulcan, fights against Gold and ultimately defeats her using a plan concocted by Licht. Another of the White-Clad's Destroyers, Stream, attacks, but Arthur arrives and defeats him with a single blow. Meanwhile, as Burns squares off with Shinra, a White-Clad member attaches an Adolla Bug to Captain Obi.
| 53 | 5 | "Chance Meeting with an Arch-Enemy"; Transliteration: "Shūteki Kaikō" (Japanese: 宿敵邂逅) | Ling Shi Sheng | Kōji Iwai | May 3, 2025 |
Captain Obi is able to prevent the Bug from piercing his skin by flexing his abs, having built up his muscles during his time in prison. Arthur is challenged by the leader of the White-Clad's Destroyers, Dragon. Despite Dragon's name and appearance feeding Arthur's fantasies of knighthood and thus empowering his plasma blade Excalibur, Dragon barely takes any damage from Arthur's attacks and his counterattack leaves Arthur defeated and Excalibur's hilt shattered. Captain Burns and Shinra continue their fight, with Burns's Voltage Nova ability growing stronger as the fight wears on.
| 54 | 6 | "Beyond Prayer's End"; Transliteration: "Inori no Hate" (Japanese: 祈りの果て) | Tatsuma Minamikawa | Tatsuma Minamikawa | May 10, 2025 |
Interspersed with flashbacks of Captain Burns's life, Shinra finally manages to defeat Burns, but Burns is suddenly impaled and killed by a Demon Infernal. Dragon unleashes a massive attack at Company 8, too powerful for even Maki to block. Sister Iris seemingly dissipates the blast through prayer, though she does not realize it. Company 8 are then confronted by the remaining White-Clad, but a masked figure calling himself "Moonlight Mask" arrives to save them.
| 55 | 7 | "Sleeping Truth"; Transliteration: "Nemuru Shinjitsu" (Japanese: 眠る真実) | Yuki Iwasaki | Naoki Kotani | May 17, 2025 |
Company 7 Captain Benimaru Shinmon, disguised as "Moonlight Mask", holds the White-Clad at bay and helps Company 8 escape to Asakusa. The Tokyo Empire officially blames Shinra for Burns's murder and brands Company 8 as traitors. Meanwhile, Company 5 Captain Hibana, hoping to solve the mystery of Doppelgängers, investigates the ruins of St. Raffles Convent where she and Sister Iris were raised as orphans. Aided by Lieutenants Huo Yan Li and Karim Flam of Company 1, she discovers a hidden room beneath the altar. Finding nothing but books about plants and bugs, the trio are interrupted by Sister Sumire, who ran the convent prior to its destruction.
| 56 | 8 | "Holy Mother of Darkness"; Transliteration: "Yami no Seibo" (Japanese: 闇の聖母) | Eiichi Kuboyama | Eiichi Kuboyama | May 24, 2025 |
| 56 | 8 | "The Knight King's Great Adventure"; Transliteration: "Kishi-Ō no Daibōken" (Japanese: 騎士王の大冒険) | Eiichi Kuboyama | Eiichi Kuboyama | May 24, 2025 |
Sister Sumire confirms Hibana's suspicions that the sisters were researching doppelgängers, mixing Adolla bugs into the children's food in the hope of producing Spontaneous Human Combustion (SHC). She is preparing for a second Great Cataclysm and when she reveals that she is the seventh pillar, able to vibrate her body as if shivering and combining with an Adolla burst to produce destructive tremors, Hibana and her friends escape. Meanwhile as Arthur recovers, Vulcan tells him that the orichalcum in his sword is fake and offers to find him some of the genuine legendary metal which will increase his power. Vulcan plants a series of clues for Arthur to follow, but Arthur misreads the last one and mistakenly deduces that orichalcum is in the Nether.
| 57 | 9 | "Holy Sword, Resurrected"; Transliteration: "Seiken Saitan" (Japanese: 聖剣再誕) | Fumihiro Ueno | Tetsuji Nakamura | May 31, 2025 |
Searching for orichalcum, Arthur leads Vulcan, Lisa and Yu into the Nether, the subterranean part of the city. They encounters Arthur's parents who abandoned him years earlier and have been living there ever since, hiding from the creditors of their failed restaurant and pretending to be resistance fighters. Coincidentally Arthur's father has come up with the same theory as Hibana regarding the Evangelist and doppelgängers. Among the pile of junk the parents collected, Vulcan finds a nose cone from a space rocket made from a temperature resistant alloy which he forges into a new sword for Arthur. Meanwhile, Shinmon encourages Shinra to awaken his third eye, but he falls asleep and meets his brother Sho in the Adolla zone.
| 58 | 10 | "Advent"; Transliteration: "Shutsugen" (Japanese: 出現) | Yuri Uema | Shinji Itadaki | June 7, 2025 |
Sho reflects on his encounter with Shinra through an Adolla link and decides to find his brother while he reluctantly lets his protector, Arrow, follow him. Hibana presents her report on the Great Cataclysm and Spontaneous Human Combustion while Captain Obi reports on support he has gather from the other Fire Force companies. They are interrupted by the appearance of Scop, the mole Shinra befriended on the Asian mainland. Scop traveled to Tokyo to tell Shinra that the Lady in Black told him that the Great Cataclysm was imminent and that the first one failed because pi had not been calculated. Meanwhile, the Evangelists begin to celebrate a mass for the coming of the Great Cataclysm and Sumire causes a giant stone column to emerge from Tokyo Bay.
| 59 | 11 | "The Great Kaiju Battlefront"; Transliteration: "Daikaijū Sensen" (Japanese: 大怪獣戦線) | Mitsuki Kitamura | Jirō Fujimoto | June 14, 2025 |
Following the appearance of the giant column, or pillar, a titanic black metallic robot-like juggernaut appears and walks through the bay towards Tokyo. The army arrives at the shore and fires a barrage of artillery and rockets at the titan but they have virtually no effect. Meanwhile, Section chief Oguro of the elite members of Hajima arrives with the half-infrernal Kurono. Juggernaut, Takeru Noto of the 2nd Company, fires a mighty blast at the titan just as Shinra flies in stop it but he is hit and rendered unconscious. Oguro sends Kurono into the water to save Shinra while Scop tells Juggernaut to stop firing at the column which is acting as a plug on an undersea volcano. Oguro sends Kurono to attack the black metallic titan and he begins to cut it to shreds.
| 60 | 12 | "The Madness of the Distant Past"; Transliteration: "Inishie no Kyōki" (Japanese: 古の狂気) | Daisuke Chiba | Kazuki Akane | June 21, 2025 |
While Kurono proceeds to destroy the black metallic titan, Fairie appears and takes the unconscious Shinra into the sky. He is attacked by Sho who is carried forward by stepping on arrows fired by his protector, Arrow. Sho is unable to cut Fairie with his sword because he uses an Adolla Burst to interfere with the laws of gravity, however Sho manages to grab Shinra as Fairie disappears. In a flashback to the Great Cataclysm, the Infernal Yona meets and kills Raffles Smith, the leader of the Caravan comprising survivors of the Cataclysm. Yona duplicates Raffles' human appearance to forge a new religion, Holy Sol, and rebuild society with the remains of Amaterasu and to prepare for a Second Great Cataclysm. Back in the present, the massive column absorbs the Kaiju's remains and turns black. Faerie then lands atop it and uses it to cause an Adolla Burst. At that moment, Shinra experiences an Adolla Link with Inca who encourages him to use his super speed to travel back to the world before the first Cataclysm where he sees the Tokyo of the 20th Century in grainy black and white images which utterly confuse him. Three months later, he awakens back in the present, strapped to a bed and after the fifth column has risen from the ocean.

=== Part 2 ===
| No. overall | No. in season | Title | Directed by | Storyboarded by | Original release date |
|---|---|---|---|---|---|
| 61 | 13 | "Unaware"; Transliteration: "Mujikaku" (Japanese: 無自覚) | Takanari Hirayama | Tatsuma Minamikawa | January 10, 2026 |
Shinra awakens to find he is confined to a bed in a Company 8 temporary secret base. Takehisa Hinawa and Akitaru Obi explain to Shinra that he had been behaving abnormally, acting out a rebellious phase: Dyeing his hair, getting a piercing and tattoos, and attacking Sister. Confused by his visions of the past, Shinra questions arthur about his anti-social behaviour, and realizes that Arthur describes an entity from Adolla, a doppelganger. Sister later explains that his behaviour, and occurrences in the Tokyo empire, indicate that the columns' appearance has brought the Adolla world closer. She reveals to him that she is a Third Generation with ignition powers. That night, a sixth black column rises from the ocean.
| 62 | 14 | "With the Sun at His Back"; Transliteration: "Nichirin wo Se ni" (Japanese: 日輪を背に) | Mineya Mori & Kento Fukuda | Shinji Itadaki | January 17, 2026 |
A seventh column emerges near the Sumida riverfront, close to Asakusa, accompanied by an infernal that looks like the former boss of the Asakusa Hikeshi, Shinmon Hibashi. Shinmon Hibashi goes out to confront his former mentor who had always treated him harshly, but also believed in his future abilities. After a fierce battle, Shinmon uses his Nichirin Akatsuki attack to defeat and destroy the doppelganger.
| 63 | 15 | "Birth"; Transliteration: "Shussei" (Japanese: 出生) | Yuka Aoki | Naoki Kotani | January 24, 2026 |
Kurono emerges from the water after defeating the black metallic titan. Sho enters Tokyo with Arrow to find out about his family and steals the files from the family register. It shows his mother's name, Mari, but not his father's name, and that he is listed as being dead. Questioning an official from that time at the community center, he learns that there was no father and that Mari claimed the boys were the result of virgin births. The official was stopped from further investigation by the Holy Sol Temple which Sho suspects was organized by Yona. A flashback shows Mari trying to explain the virgin birth at the hospital after being disinherited by her family and being forced to change her name from Abe to Kusakabe. In an Alolla link, Sho sees his mother and experiences her memories which show that after the birth, Mari is cheered up when a doctor tells her of a legend of a woman who gives virgin birth to a son who will become a hero and save the world. She names her son Shinra. Later, she has another virgin birth when Sho is born. With this information, Sho resolves to help his brother in preventing the impending second Great Cataclysm.
| 64 | 16 | "Savior"; Transliteration: "Kyūseishu" (Japanese: 救世主) | Eiichi Kuboyama | Shinji Itadaki | January 31, 2026 |
The 8th pillar rises from the sea, accompanied by Faerie and a titan in the form of a compass rose, causing spontaneous combustion of some citizens along the shore. Company 2 fires their Honda Missile Super Killer Head Ram containing Captain Gustav Honda, but it just bounces off the titan. Oguro prepares to send Kurono to attack the titan just as an impassive Emperor Raffles I appears as a flaming figure. Karin from Company 4 raises a shield to protect the shore while Shinra goes on the attack, however he is tossed around like a pinball by Faerie's control of gravity. Sho appears and tells Shinra that if they can provide hope, it will help humanity to prevent the destruction. Sister sets up a barrier to protect the shore, enabling Shinra to use the full force of his light speed kick, punching a hole through the titan which sinks into the sea. However, instead of being seen as a hero and a savior, he is seen as a devil who destroyed the emperor, and he disappears.
| 65 | 17 | "At the Center of the World"; Transliteration: "Sekai no Chūshin de" (Japanese: 世界の中心で) | Daisuke Chiba | Kōji Iwai | February 7, 2026 |
Following the destruction of the titan, and the fact that Shinra, Sister and the first pillar have disappeared, plus the fact that Amaterasu has stopped functioning, Licht surmises that they are all somehow connected. Arrow appears before the Fire Force and says they must work together to find the key to restarting Amaterasu and prevent the Great Cataclysm. Meanwhile, increasing numbers of people are transforming into infernals. Arrow and a small group of Company 8 enter Amaterasu, but are soon confronted by Charon and Rirsu backed by a multitude of infernals. Arrow assists Takehisa Hinawa to destroy them while the rest of the team deal with the remaining infernals. Ogun engages Charon, who absorbs and reflects Ogun's attacks, but after almost being beaten to a pulp, Ogun is saved when Charon is shot by Hinawa.
| 66 | 18 | "Incantation of Destruction"; Transliteration: "Horobi no Jumon" (Japanese: 滅びの呪文) | Tatsuya Kyōgoku | Shinji Itadaki | February 14, 2026 |
Vulcan leads the rest of Company 8 into the core of Amaterasu searching for a way to restart it. Yu uses a portable battery to open the inner doors to the core, but they are interrupted by Giovanni who tells them the disappeared pillars are now in Adolla and that they are the key to turning the planet into a flaming star. He is exposed as a writhing mass of insects, but when he attacks, Lisa uses her ability to disrupt magnetic fields to disperse them, revealing Giovanni as a small spider. However, Giovanni, recalls his insects, regenerating himself, and it takes all of Vulcan and Lisa's ingenuity to defeat him. Unfortunately, one of his insects had made its way into Yu who has become an infernal controlled by Giovanni, who now has the key to Amaterasu.
| 67 | 19 | "Those Who Fight Back"; Transliteration: "Aragau Mono-tachi" (Japanese: 抗う者たち) | Fumihiro Ueno | Jirō Fujimoto | February 21, 2026 |
| 67 | 19 | "Apocalyptic Imagination"; Transliteration: "Shūmatsu Imēji" (Japanese: 終末想像(イメージ)) | Fumihiro Ueno | Jirō Fujimoto | February 21, 2026 |
Although wounded, Charon tries to keep Hinawa and the rest of Company 8 out of Amaterasu. As he continues to absorb countless shots from Hinawa, he recalls his powerful bond with Hamuea who, from within Adolla, senses his impending death. A gigantic eye appears over Tokyo and rains fire and destruction over the city. Inside Amaterasu, Giovanni has control of Yu's body, but Arthur arrives, having earlier become separated from the others, and with a deft action with his blade, he exorcises and burns Giovanni, returning Yu to normal. Yu presents Arthur with a ring containing a star fragment from Vulcan, finally transforming him into the Knight King. Company 8 reunites in the center of Amaterasu, where Joker explains that the destructive eye is a construction of humanity's negative emotions, and that the flames of the Great Cataclysm use the image of humanity's despair as its source of energy. Licht realizes that only humanity's hope will stop the destruction.
| 68 | 20 | "Where Hope Is"; Transliteration: "Kibō no Arika" (Japanese: 希望の在処) | Hiroaki Takagi & Taichi Atarashi | Hitomi Tsuruta | February 28, 2026 |
A woman identifying herself as Sugita Sumire forecasts the Great Cataclysm and the transformation of the planet into a fiery ball. Captain Obi broadcasts a message to the Fire Force that the only way to stop the impending cataclysm, which is using people's despair to fuel the flames, is by spreading a message of hope. As Company 8 assists people into shelters and gives them hope, the White Clad doppelganger of Assault appears before them and prepares to attack. However, he is interrupted by Tamaki's accidental display of her underwear, which also horrifies the onlookers. Suddenly, a young boy called Tatsuto provides voice of reason, describing himself as World-Builder and stands up for her. As the battle between the doppelganger intensifies, the real Assault arrives and fights with Tamaki whose uniform is slowly shredded, revealing more of her body. Revulsion at her exposure slowly turns into admiration of the body and eros, and the tide of public opinion turns to support Tamaki. Eventually, the doppelganger is destroyed by the combined force of Assault's Bullet and Tamaki's Lucky Lecher Lure.
| 69 | 21 | "Dragon and Knight Surge Toward the Heavens"; Transliteration: "Ryūki Shōten" (Japanese: 竜騎衝天) | Tatsuya Kyōgoku | Tatsuya Kyōgoku & Mamoru Kurosawa | March 7, 2026 |
While the Tokyo horizon is covered in flames Arthur plans to stop the White Clad called Dragon who raises erupting volcanoes from the sea floor along the Tamara Riverfront and spreads despair. They engage in a battle that takes them to the moon's surface, where Artur begins to collapse from a lack of oxygen. He places the Star Ring from Yu on his finger, which enables him to fight in space. They continue their battle, with Arthur striking seemingly futile blows, until he uses the Violet Earth Cleaver to finally destroy Dragon. However, Arthur is also severely damaged with his body cut in half, and he calls on Shinra to continue the fight to save Earth.
| 70 | 22 | "Hero Resurrected"; Transliteration: "Hīrō Fukkatsu" (Japanese: ヒーロー復活) | Yuka Aoki | Shinji Itadaki | March 14, 2026 |
With Arthur's defeat of Dragon, the flames of the Great Calaclysm begin to die down, sending Faerie into paroxysms of anger. Meanwhile, Kurono fights his psychotic doppelganger who is surprised at the berserker personality that others have attributed to him. Although their powers are evenly matched, the real Kurono is the more skilled fighter, and he defeats his doppelganger. Elsewhere, Joker is facing his own doppelganger with what appears to be the Burns doppelganger. Instead, Burns kills the doppelganger, explaining that in Adolla, he defeated and suppressed his own doppelganger and took control of it. In the sky above, Shinmon faces his doppelganger who thinks he is supremely powerful, but Shinmon easily defeats him because people don't believe he is that powerful, much to his disappointment. In effect, doppelgangers have the attributes people think they should have. In Adolla, Sister Iris meets her doppelganger, Amaterasu. Sho confronts Faerie and stabs him, but Faerie has the last laugh as he commits suicide just as the moon begins to drift towards Earth, causing mass despair. However, Shinra bursts onto the scene, and with a supreme effort, he pushes the moon back up into the sky. Sho joins him, and they head into Adolla where they encounter Haumea.
| 71 | 23 | "Despair Saintess"; Transliteration: "Zetsubō no Seijo" (Japanese: 絶望の聖女) | Jirō Fujimoto | Jirō Fujimoto | March 21, 2026 |
With her eyes now opened, Haumea burns Inca and Sumire to death, absorbing their ignition powers and becoming a god-like being. Having taken on all of humanity's unconscious despair, she believes extinction brought on by another Great Cataclysm will be its ultimate salvation. Shinra and Sho fight Haumea, but are unable to touch her due to the powers she absorbed from the other pillars. When Haumea reveals she has also killed Iris and Amaterasu, Shinra anger increases, but Sho prevents him from succumbing to his desire for revenge. Shinra remembers that he is fighting for life and humanity, and his renewed attacks on Haumea start to reach her. Haumea directs Shinra's attention down to the surface, where Company 8 and their allies are still evacuating civilians. Captain Obi's doppelganger appears, sneaks up on the real Obi, and slits his throat. As Shinra witnesses Obi's death, he screams with rage and despair which kickstarts the Great Cataclysm, and the planet becomes engulfed in black flames. In outer space, as Arthur's lifeless body drifts aimlessly, his hand grasps the hilt of Excalibur.
| 72 | 24 | "Answer"; Transliteration: "Kotae" (Japanese: 答え) | Mineya Mori | Shinji Itadaki | March 28, 2026 |
Before Shinra gives in to rage and despair, Arthur, with his body restored, swings his Violet Earth Cleaver down on Shinra's head to bring him to his senses, reminding him that he is a hero who must always have hope. As Shinra and Sho stand up to Haumea again, their mother Mari appears before them in her infernal form; Haumea reveals that Mari is the Evangelist's doppelganger. Shinra goes back on the offensive, but his attacks are still unable to fully reach Haumea. Shinra joins hands with Sho and Mari, and they undergo Soul Resonance to merge into a supremely powerful being called "Shinra Bansho Man". Even after fully Haumea merges with the Evangelist to form an even more powerful entity, but her attacks have no effect on Shinra's new form. With his god-like powers, Shinra dispels the black flames surrounding the Earth, restoring its atmosphere, landscape, and wildlife. Both Haumea and Sho point out that reviving humanity may just start the cycle of despair all over again, risking another Great Cataclysm. With his brother and mother's support, however, Shinra holds on to hope, and he restores civilization and humanity back to life, although with a cartoon-like appearance.
| 73 | 25 | "Hero's Tale"; Transliteration: "Hīrō no Monogatari" (Japanese: ヒーローの物語) | Tatsuma Minamikawa | Tatsuma Minamikawa | April 4, 2026 |
Realizing that humanity's despair stems from their fear of death, Shinra has changed the laws of death to make it not seem as scary. To that end, he creates a new god of death, Shinigami from Soul Eater. To convince Haumea to give this new world a chance, Shinra reunites her with Charon. Iris and Inca are brought back to life as well, while Amaterasu and Sumire choose to disappear with humanity's despair. Shinigami takes all the Adolla Bursts away before departing, and Shinra reunites with Company 8. In an epilogue, the World Hero Force is established as a replacement for the Fire Force to protect the new world from threats, Arthur has returned to Earth, his Excalibur has come to life and become the Excalibur of Soul Eater, and Inca has become a witch and begs to bear Shinra's child. 25 years later, Shinra is the Supreme Commander of the Hero Force, with his daughters about to join the organization. Shinigami creates Death the Kid, young versions of Black Star and Soul Evans are shown, and a young Maka Albarn's parents read to her the story of the Fire Force.

== Home media release ==
=== Japanese ===
DMM.com (Japan – Region 2/A)
| Vol. | Episodes | Release date | Ref. |
|---|---|---|---|
| 1 | 1–12 | August 8, 2025 | |
| 2 | 13–25 | July 8, 2026 | |
