= Shinra =

Shinra may refer to:

- Alternative transliteration of Silla, one of the Three Kingdoms of Korea
- Shinra Technologies, a subsidiary of Square Enix which closed in 2016

== Fictional characters and organisations ==
=== Video games ===
- Shinra Electric Power Company, a fictional company in Final Fantasy VII
- Rufus Shinra, a character in Final Fantasy VII
- Shinra, a minor character in Final Fantasy X-2
- Shinra, a character in Ikaruga

=== Manga and light novels ===
- Shinra Kishitani, one of the main characters in Durarara!!
- Shinra Kusakabe, protagonist of the manga series Fire Force
- Shinra Tensei, a jutsu (technique) in the Naruto manga series
