= My Hero Academia season 4 =

Fourth season of My Hero Academia

My Hero Academia
- Season 4
- Cover art of the first Blu-ray volume of the fourth season released by Toho on January 22, 2020
- No. of episodes: 25

Release
- Original network: ytv, NTV
- Original release: October 12, 2019 – April 4, 2020

Season chronology
- ← Previous; Season 3 Next → Season 5

The fourth season of the My Hero Academia anime television series was produced by Bones and directed by Kenji Nagasaki (chief director) and Masahiro Mukai, following the story of Kōhei Horikoshi's original My Hero Academia manga series from the second half of the 14th volume to the first chapters of the 21st volume. It covers the "Shie Hassaikai" (chapters 125–162), "Remedial Course" (chapters 163–168), "U.A. School Festival" (chapters 169–183), and the first part of the "Pro Hero" arc (chapters 184–190); partially including chapters 191–193. The season aired from October 12, 2019, to April 4, 2020, on ytv and NTV.

The season follows Izuku Midoriya and his classmates in their Hero Work-Studies, where they face off against the Shie Hassaikai group, with their mission is to stop them from creating a Quirk-Destroying Drug and save a little girl at the center of it. Meanwhile, two students of U.A. High attend a special Hero License Course, having failed their previous exam. Then, U.A. holds its annual School Festival and Class 1-A decides to have a dance performance with a live band in hopes to ease the public's doubt of their worth. Later, the new hero rankings was revealed shortly after one of the world's greatest Heroes was forced to retire.

Funimation has licensed the season for an English-language release in North America. Funimation premiered the first episode of the fourth season at Anime Expo on July 6, 2019, with the English dub. Crunchyroll and Hulu are simulcasting the season outside of Asia as it airs, while FunimationNow is streaming in Simuldub. Funimation's adaptation premiered on Adult Swim's Toonami programming block on November 9, 2019. Several episodes on Toonami got delayed, due to the schedule redaction or disruption and the effects of COVID-19 pandemic which ended on June 28, 2020, instead of May as it originally scheduled.

Four pieces of theme music are used for this season: two opening themes and two ending themes. For the first fourteen episodes, the opening theme is "Polaris" (ポラリス) by Blue Encount, while the ending theme is "Kōkai no Uta" (航海の唄, The Song of the Voyage) by Sayuri. The second opening theme is "Starmarker" (スターマーカー) by Kana-Boon and the ending theme is "Shout Baby" by Ryokuōshoku Shakai. Kyoka Jiro starring Chrissy Costanza performs the insert songs "Each Goal" in episode 19 and "Hero too" in episode 23, with the former insert song was uncredited, while the latter insert song was credited as the U.A. School Festival track.

== Episodes ==
No. overall	No. in season	Title	Directed by (Note: Information is taken from the ending credits of each episode.)	Storyboarded by	Original release date	English air date	Viewership rating
64	1	"The Scoop on U.A. Class 1-A"; Transliteration: "Sukūpu U.A. Ichi-Nen Ei-Gumi" (Japanese: スクープ雄英1年A組)	Naomi Nakayama	Masahiro Mukai	October 12, 2019 (Note: Due to emergency reporting of Typhoon Hagibis, broadcast of episode 64 was suspended in certain regions of Japan, and international simulcasts were delayed.)	November 9, 2019	N/A
Freelance journalist Taneo Tokuda gets an exclusive scoop with Class 1-A in hopes of uncovering the new Symbol of Peace after the retirement of All Might. Shota Aizawa explains to his students that Nezu granted permission for the interview thinking it would be good for their parents and guardians to see them living happily in the dorms. Taneo tells them about taking pictures of his daily life at school and ask some questions about them. He records Class 1-A's daily lives and reviews their Quirks. After he is finished, he narrows down the possible candidates for All Might's successor to just Izuku Midoriya. While it was raining in the afternoon, All Might went to the bedrooms of Class 1-A, bringing some snacks to share. He meets Izuku outside who is training on his own. After the talk, All Might leaves and promise him to start training in the next day. Taneo has a conversation with Izuku about everything the latter has done, since he is All Might's idol. Taneo leaves afterwards and Ochaco goes out to tell Izuku that dinner is ready, although she forgets the matter of what he is talking to reporter about when she knows that he had brought meat buns to share with Class 1-A.
65	2	"Overhaul"; Transliteration: "Ōbāhōru" (Japanese: オーバーホール)	Tomo Ōkubo	Masahiro Mukai	October 19, 2019	November 16, 2019	4.5%
Overhaul tricks Twice into bringing him to the League of Villains' hideout under the false pretenses of joining the group. There, he invites Shigaraki's group to work for him in the Shie Hassaikai, a yakuza group. while explaining his goal to fill the void left by All For One in the criminal underworld. This results in a conflict where Overhaul kills Magne and destroys Mr. Compress' left arm before taking his leave, while offering Shigaraki time to reconsider. Meanwhile, as Izuku enters Hero-Work Studies, All Might has Mirio assist Izuku apply for Sir Nighteye's agency, who was All Might's former sidekick and is investigating Overhaul, while All Might thinks back to when Nezu presented Mirio as a worthy successor to One For All. But Mirio warns Izuku that Sir Nighteye is very strict, so the latter must impress him on his own without too much of Mirio's help. Izuku enters Nighteye's agency and is shocked to see Nighteye torturing Bubble Girl with his tickle machine for not making him laugh. Izuku tries to make him laugh by changing his face into an expression that looks to be the same as All Might, but Sir Nighteye is unimpressed and asks if he is making fun of All Might.
66	3	"Boy Meets…"; Transliteration: "Bōi Mītsu" (Japanese: ボーイ・ミーツ…)	Masashi Abe	Takashi Kawabata	October 26, 2019	November 23, 2019	4.0%
Upon Sir Nighteye scolds him for his errors in his All Might impression and seeing his extensive All Might memorabilia, Izuku realizes that Nighteye is a All Might super fan and is able to impress him by aditing that his impression was based on a lesser known incident involving All Might. Nighteye asks Izuku to present him with a contract and explains the difference between the Hero Work-Studies and the week-long internships. Izuku wants to participate so he can stand out, but Sir Nighteye refuses to stamp his paper. He claims Izuku brings no benefit to his agency and asks how he plans to be useful. Izuku battles Sir Nighteye to get his stamp and approval to join his agency. Nighteye uses his Quirk Foresight to dodge Izuku, and shakes his confidence and doubts that Izuku is worthy of being All Might's successor and holding One for All. Though Izuku fails to grab the stamp, he earns Nighteye's respect after he realizes that Izuku avoided all of the All Might merchandise in his office. Nighteye reveals he merely testing Izuku's abilities and was always going allow Izuku to join his agency, though only to make Izuku give up and give One For All to Mirio, whom Nighteye sees as a more worthy successor. He returns to dorms and tells his friends that he accepts the Hero Work-Studies in Nighteye Agency, and congratulates him although he does not tell them that the reason why Sir Nighteye just took him is to make him give up One For All. Some time later, Izuku and Mirio encounter Overhaul by accident, along with a frightened girl as the first Hero Work-Studies is about to begin.
67	4	"Fighting Fate"; Transliteration: "Aragau Unmei" (Japanese: 抗う運命)	Shōji Ikeno	Kō Matsuo	November 9, 2019 (Note: Due to the 2019 Rugby World Cup Finals on November 2, 2019, broadcast of episode 67 was postponed to the following week.)	November 30, 2019	4.6%
After encountering Izuku and Mirio by accident, Overhaul introduces the frightened girl as his daughter Eri. Izuku and Mirio are forced to allow Eri to leave with Overhaul to keep their cover. Mirio reveals Eri's intent to Izuku and says that they should ask Sir Nighteye on what to do next before he leaves and ask them to return to the office. Afterwards, still emotionally shaken by Nighteye, Izuku confronts All Might to demand the whole truth and asks him about why he did not tell him about Nighteye and Mirio and their connection to One For All. As All Might's successor, he desires to know the full truth about everything. All Might shares that Nighteye was a big fan of his and even convinced to take him as a sidekick and the brains of his operation. Six years ago, All Might dissolve their partnership following his battle with All For One. Sir Nighteye tries to convince him about his dangers and warns that the Symbol of Peace will perish to a gruesome villain, but All Might refuses. Back in present, Izuku believes that All Might will fight to live because he has been nurturing him since then. Emotional, Izuku agrees to fight fate alongside his master. Elsewhere, in the Shie Hassaikai Compound, Tomura Shigaraki arrives and a black communion begins.
68	5	"Let's Go, Gutsy Red Riot"; Transliteration: "Gattsuda Rettsura Reddo Raiotto" (Japanese: ガッツだレッツラレッドライオット)	Tetsuya Miyanishi (Note: Credited under the pen name "Setsumu Dōkawa" (堂川 セツム, Dōkawa Setsumu).)	Shinji Ishihira	November 16, 2019	December 7, 2019	3.2%
After being brought to the Shie Hassaikai's lair, Shigaraki explains he only realized Overhaul's plans after he removed the bullet that hit Mr. Compress, which caused him to momentarily lose his Quirk. In Esuha City, Eijiro Kirishima and Tamaki Amajiki, Suneater of U.A's Big Three, accompany pro hero Fat Gum on patrol when they confront criminals using both bullets that stop Quirks along with Quirk-enhancement drugs. When Tamaki is shot and his Quirk is temporarily blocked, Kirishima uses his new Red Riot Unbreakable technique to stop the remaining criminal. Fat Gum and the citizens commend Eijiro on a spectacular debut. However, Kirishima recalls his cowardly past and realizes that he has improved since then. Kirishima, Tamaki, and Fat Gum regroup with the police. Fat Gum prepares to take his trainees to the hospital, but he is very worried about drugs that can stop someone from using their Quirk. The next day at school, Kirishima's classmates congratulate his debut that is featured in the news. Ochaco and Tsuyu are also featured on the news. While everyone else is carefree, Izuku cannot help but feel Eri's weight on his shoulders.
69	6	"An Unpleasant Talk"; Transliteration: "Iyana Hanashi" (Japanese: 嫌な話)	Tomo Ōkubo	Tomo Ōkubo	November 23, 2019	December 14, 2019	4.1%
Izuku, Kirishima, Ochaco, and Tsuyu learn that Sir Nighteye has organized a meeting with the other Hero Work-Studies and numerous pro heroes to discuss the threat posed by Overhaul and the Shie Hassaikai. During the meeting, it is revealed that the bullet that shot Tamaki contained the blood and cells of a human whose Quirk is similar to Aizawa's, speculated to be Eri. Nighteye then proposes having the heroes investigate all known Hassaikai properties to find Eri's location. Eraser Head asks Sir Nighteye to use his foresight to gain information, however, he refuses because he might view someone's imminent death. After a somber exchange, the meeting concludes with all the heroes agreeing to investigate. The U.A. students meet in the back, saddened by the state of the girl. Aizawa arrives and encourages his students to keep fighting, truly believing they can save the girl next time. Izuku regains his confidence and is determined to rescue her. Meanwhile, Eri reminisces about her meeting with Izuku.
70	7	"Go!!"	Miwa Sasaki	Miwa Sasaki	November 30, 2019	January 4, 2020	4.8%
Izuku, Kirishima, Ochaco, and Tsuyu are in the middle of training. Deadly focused and somewhat brooding, the Work-Study students move with extra precision, garnering the attention of their classmates. With advice from Aizawa, Izuku and Mirio overcome their emotions following the meeting. In the middle of the night, the four Work-Study students receive messages from Sir Nighteye informing them that they finally know where Eri is located and calls everyone to another conference in the preparation for the impending rescue operation. Eraser Head comments that the heroes worked quickly. Once everyone is at the Nighteye Agency, Sir Nighteye reveals that Eri is being kept in the main hideout underground. When Fat Gum asks him how he discovered that, Sir Nighteye shows a toy intended for little girls and tells them that a member of Shie Hassaikai is buying a lot of toys like that. Nighteye uses his Quirk on one of Overhaul's subordinates and ascertains Eri's location. With intel on the layout of the Shie Hassaikai's headquarters and support from the police, the heroes launch a raid with Dragon Hero's group subduing several of the yakuza, while Nighteye and Fat Gum's groups proceed to the lower levels to retrieve Eri from Overhaul.
71	8	"Suneater of the Big Three"; Transliteration: "Biggu 3 no San'ītā" (Japanese: ビッグ3のサンイーター)	Masashi Abe	Shinji Satō	December 7, 2019	January 11, 2020	4.8%
Back in middle school, Tamaki Amajiki transferred schools on the first day of the spring term. He messed up his introduction due to his shy nature and was sure no one would want to be friends with someone awkward like himself, until a boy that he was best friend the most which is none other than Mirio Togata. Back in the present day, during the start of the raid against the Hassaikai, Tamaki hopes that he can shine as brightly as Mirio does. Sir Nighteye leads the others inside the hideout and Eraser Head explains the extreme loyalty between members of the Yakuza. Meanwhile, Joi Irinaka of the Shie Hassaikai uses a Quirk-enhancement drug to take control of the basement level to separate the intruders, with Tamaki convincing the others to continue without him as he battles three members of the Eight Bullets, Overhaul's elite enforcers. Despite being overwhelmed and outnumbered, Tamaki was able to defeat them successfully and reveals that he understands their bonds even though he cannot understand where they come from. He says that friends do not use each other because friends do not eat friends.
72	9	"Red Riot"; Transliteration: "Reddo Raiotto" (Japanese: 烈怒頼雄斗(レッドライオット))	Shōji Ikeno	Shinji Ishihira	December 14, 2019	January 18, 2020	3.7%
Deku and Kirishima worries about Tamaki. Fat Gum tells them to believe in Tamaki and Kirishima decides that he must keep trust on Tamaki. Eraser Head notes Mimic's lack of activity and theorizes that Mimic can only use his Quirk in one area at a time. As Aizawa strikes using the wall by Mimic, Fat Gum pushes him in time and gets separated from the group along with Kirishima who also reveals that he tried to save Eraser Head at the same time, and ended up facing two Eight Expendable members Kendo Rappa and Hekiji Tengai. Kirishima struggles and is heavily injured, but is spurred back into the fight after remembering his struggles with courage during his middle school years, and his desire to be like his idol, Crimson Riot. He then helps Fat Gum, buying him enough time to convert the damage from Rappa's blows into power while also burning away most of his fat. Fat Gum defeats the two villains by using his punch that shatters Hekiji's barrier and sends both flying into the wall, after he claims that the villains lost this fight because they underestimated the chivalrous spirit of Red Riot.
73	10	"Temp Squad"; Transliteration: "Shukkō" (Japanese: 出向)	Tomo Ōkubo	Tomo Ōkubo	December 21, 2019	January 25, 2020	3.8%
Fat Gum and Kirishima are victorious in their fight against Rappa and Tengai. Rappa, despite still being capable of fighting, allows the two to recuperate out of respect and reveals Overhaul's plan. He asks Fat Gum to treat Kirishima's injuries so that he can fight again. Kendo tells Fat Gum that he lives for the thrill of the fight and admits he enjoyed their battle. He even claims that Kirishima was the best time to fight before declaring the battle a draw. Meanwhile, Izuku's group struggle against Irinaka, before Toga and Twice ambush them. Though Shigaraki had previously loaned Toga and Twice to the Shie Hassaikai as part of Overhaul's conditions, the two are encouraged by Shigaraki's confidence in them to provoke Irinaka. Mimic snaps and drags everyone deeper underground as he tries to crush both heroes and villains using his ability.
74	11	"Lemillion"; Transliteration: "Rumirion" (Japanese: ルミリオン)	Tetsuya Miyanishi	Tetsuya Miyanishi	December 28, 2019	February 1, 2020	4.1%
While Toga and Twice were subjected to Shin Nemoto's Confession Quirk, they backstab the yakuza of their own accord by taunting Irinaka into exposing himself, allowing the heroes to capture him. Sir Nighteye knocks him unconscious by throwing one of his Hyper-Density Seals and Izuku catches him before he crashes into the ground. Sir Nighteye realizes that the League betrayed Mimic and says that the heroes have been used. Meanwhile, Mirio manages to rescue Eri after defeating Nemoto and Hassakai member Deidoro Sakaki. Overhaul admits that Eri is not his daughter and engages Mirio in battle, but is nearly defeated. Nemoto intervenes by firing one of the completed Quirk-Destroying bullets at Eri. Mirio is forced to take the hit and loses his Quirk. Overhaul declares that like Mirio, he will fix diseased men. Mirio continues fighting, but as he is defeated by Overhaul, Izuku arrives and joins the battle.
75	12	"Unforeseen Hope"; Transliteration: "Mienai Kibō" (Japanese: 見えない希望)	Shōji Ikeno	Kō Matsuo	January 4, 2020	February 8, 2020	3.3%
Earlier in the day, Rock Lock tells everyone to make one final push to save the girl. Nighteye's team leaves Mimic under Rock Lock's watch. The Pro Hero admits that he is just worried about the young heroes all this time and that they have been stronger heroes than any of the adults. Rock Lock places his faith in Deku and Sir Nighteye. Izuku, Nighteye and Eraser Head catches up to Mirio and Izuku uses his punch on Overhaul's arm which sends him flying away. Overhaul's subordinate Hari Kurono removes himself and Aizawa from play, revealing Eri to be the previous Hassaikai boss's granddaughter. Overhaul refuses to accept defeat and uses his Quirk to fuse with Nemoto, transforming into a four-armed monster. Nighteye orders Izuku to take Mirio and Eri to safety while he holds off Overhaul, but is gravely wounded, and his Foresight shows him Izuku being killed and Overhaul escaping with Eri. Izuku tries to jump out in a harm's way but is injured by Overhaul's spikes attack. Despite this, Izuku refuses to give up on saving Eri. Suddenly, Ryukyu's team crashes through the roof with Rikiya Katsukame in tow.
76	13	"Infinite 100%"; Transliteration: "Mugen Hyaku-pāsento" (Japanese: 無限100%)	Masashi Abe, Tetsuya Miyanishi	Takashi Kawabata, Masahiro Mukai	January 11, 2020	February 15, 2020	4.3%
While Deku faces Overhaul, Ryukyu's team deal with the Hassaikai Rikiya Katsukame. Toga, posing as Izuku, goads the girls into defeating Rikiya in a way that exposes the basement. Eri notices Mirio's cape flying through the air and is reminded of everyone's desire to save her. Eri is spurred by the heroes' resolve to save her, revealing her Quirk to "rewind" living things, separating Nemoto from Overhaul while being grabbed by Izuku. Overhaul assimilates Rikiya to go after Izuku and Eri. Overhaul warns Izuku that Eri's Quirk would rewind him out of existence, so Izuku uses 100% of his power to face him, harnessing Eri's Quirk to undo the damage One For All does to his body. Despite her exhaustion as well as the horrible revelation, Ochaco still wishes to try and help Izuku. Nighteye asks Tsuyu to help Mirio while Ryukyu and Ochaco help him to the surface. After learning that Eri's Quirk will not rewounded him out of existence, Deku defeats Overhaul much to Nighteye's shock, as Izuku has defied the visions of his Foresight.
77	14	"Bright Future"; Transliteration: "Akarui Mirai" (Japanese: 明るい未来)	Miwa Sasaki	Miwa Sasaki	January 18, 2020	February 29, 2020 (Note: Episode 77 was delayed on Adult Swim on the night of February 22, 2020, due to a Toonami schedule redaction and the airing of Dr. Stone's finale.)	3.4%
The raid on the Shie Hassaikai is a success as Izuku defeats Overhaul, Eri separates him from Rikiya while Tamaki saves Aizawa from Kurono. Eri's power rewinds Overhaul back to normal, negating his monstrous form. Ochaco arrests and restrains Overhaul before updating Ryukyu on the situation. Eri's power is spiraling out of control, but Aizawa erases her Quirk before it kills Izuku. Toga and Twice escape and inform the League of Villains about the Yakuza's loss. The League then intercepts the police convoy to enact their revenge on Overhaul while the attacks of Dabi and Mr. Compress turns the sand-powered hero Snatch to glass. Shigaraki and Mr. Compress destroy both of Overhaul's arms so he can never use his Quirk again, and take the four Quirk-Destroying bullets. Spinner tells his allies they need to leave quickly while Overhaul breaks out into hives and screams out in agony after realizing that he will not be able to heal the boss forever. Meanwhile, after being checked out of the hospital, Izuku learns that Sir Nighteye's injuries are fatal. He, All Might, and Mirio visit the hero in his final moments where he use his Foresight to tells Mirio he'll be the finest hero the world will ever see.
78	15	"Smoldering Flames"; Transliteration: "Kusuburu Honō" (Japanese: 燻る炎)	Shōji Ikeno	Naomi Nakayama	January 25, 2020	March 7, 2020	4.3%
Up in the mountains, the police along with Gran Torino find and successfully apprehend Kurogiri of the League of Villains, but unexpectedly run into one of All For One's servants, Gigantomachia. At the hospital, Izuku checks on Mirio before he leaves for school, but Eri is still feverish and must remain behind in the hospital. Meanwhile, Shoto Todoroki and Katsuki Bakugo head off to their Provisional Hero License special training class, guided by All Might and Present Mic. The Work-Study group returns to Heights Alliance and reunites with the rest of Class 1-A. Ida reminds everyone to be considerate of their exhaustion, but Izuku said that it is okay. Ochaco recalls talking to Aizawa about being unable to save Sir Nighteye. She resolves to help save people in the future. At the training facility, Endeavor confronts All Might and wants to have a talk. As the other students walk through hallways, they hope that others do not cross paths. Seiji and Bakugo clash personalities, while Gang Orca and Yokumiru Mera watch from another room as they plan to put the students in their toughest trial yet.
79	16	"Win Those Kids' Hearts"; Transliteration: "Tsukame Gaki Kokoro" (Japanese: 掴めガキ心)	Hidekazu Hara	Hidekazu Hara	February 1, 2020	March 14, 2020	5.2%
Bakugo and Todoroki attend their special Provisional Hero License course, having failed the last exam. After changing into their Hero costumes, Todoroki and Inasa Yoarashi have a conversation while walking on their way to training grounds. Inasa asks him about the foods he likes. Todoroki replies that he likes cold Soba, while Inasa says he prefers hot. Inasa thinks they have something in common and Shoto advises him not to try to force a friendship between them. Bakugo feels upset about their interactions. They, along with Inasa and the real Camie Utsushimi from Shiketsu High School, are tasked with winning the hearts of unruly Masegaki Elementary School children. They are considered to be misbehaved and the lacking of discipline or respect even their teacher, Komari Ikoma had lost control. The children begins to hit, mock, and making fun of the special exam trainees. The trainees tries to work together and befriend with the unruly children, but to no avail. Meanwhile, Endeavor speaks with All Might about being the Symbol of Peace. Back in training ground, Present Mic privately wondering how they are having a rough time with a bunch of grade school kids. He is surprised when Seiji suddenly appears at his side and respond by saying that fighting power with it, is the epitome of foolishness because by doing so will only breed ill will in the heart of the kids. Komari notes that chatting to the children will not work as they realize that their Quirks are superior.
80	17	"Relief for License Trainees"; Transliteration: "Hokkore Karimen Kōshū" (Japanese: ホッコれ仮免講習)	Masashi Abe	Takashi Kawabata	February 8, 2020	March 21, 2020	4.3%
In order to win the hearts of the Masegaki Elementary School children, Bakugo, Inasa, Todoroki, and Camie work together under Katsuki's strategy. Present Mic is impressed, saying that at their age he did not have as much power as they did. Seiji suggests that the reason for their power is possibly due to the "Quirk Singularity doomsday theory". He explains that Quirks are mixing more and more as the generations pass and that each generation is producing stronger and more complex Quirks, reaching a point where they can be too hard to control. Seeing the children have stopped being unruly and that they pay attention to their elders, professor Ikoma can barely contain her excitement of seeing what the students have achieved. Present Mic tells her that now it is her turn to guide them properly. At the end of the day, Endeavor vows to Todoroki to become a hero that the latter can be proud of. Later, the U.A. students attend Nighteye's funeral along with the pro heroes. Eri has woken up at the hospital, but is still emotionally unstable. Furthermore, the horn on her forehead, which her Rewind originates from, has shrunk. Meanwhile, Izuku notices Yuga Aoyama acting strangely. Later, Aoyama reveals that he knows Izuku's body cannot handle his Quirk, and that he himself cannot handle his own Quirk. The two boys form a friendship over their shared struggle.
81	18	"School Festival"; Transliteration: "Bunkasai" (Japanese: 文化祭)	Tetsuya Miyanishi	Shinji Ishihira	February 15, 2020	March 28, 2020	4.5%
For October, the U.A. students plan to launch a school festival. Ida and Momo asking their classmates for suggestions about what things will include or not, for the time of the event. At night, with the exception of interns and Katsuki in the dorms, students continue to discuss what to do for the upcoming school festival. Ida considers that their contribution should be something that gives the other students pleasure and relieves stress. All Class 1-A students agreeing the ideas they have suggest including the music and dance, which their program will be a grand musical performance. Meanwhile, Izuku and Mirio visit Eri as she has requested to see them. Eri wishes to know more of them, as they saved her. Eri is unaware of Nighteye's death, but feels guilty for endangering the people who rescued her. Mirio reassures her, and asks her to smile, but she is unable to, and Izuku believes that she still has to be saved from Overhaul's influence. He asks Aizawa to allow her to attend the school festival, so she can smile again. Aizawa agrees, and talks it over with principal Nezu. Meanwhile, a villain named Gentle Criminal and his subordinate, La Brava, are searching for a scheme that will make him be remembered. On a rooftop, while pouring tea, Gentle tells La Brava that he is searching for something that will make him more magnificent.
82	19	"Prepping for the School Festival Is the Funnest Part"; Transliteration: "Bunkasai-tte Junbi-shiteru Toki ga Ichiban Tanoshii yo ne" (Japanese: 文化祭って準備してる時が一番楽しいよね)	Shōji Ikeno	Kō Matsuo	February 22, 2020	April 4, 2020	4.3%
La Brava begins watching an online video where Gentle Criminal is narrating how some Heroes and Villains have left their mark on the annals of history. As she gets too excited about the video, Gentle enters the room and asks La Brava if the video has been uploaded. The duo begins recording their next video. It begins as Gentle introduces himself as the man who uploads videos of what are called criminal actions, but he ensures that he does not commit crimes at random. While Class 1-A prepare for their school festival, Gentle Criminal comes up with a plan which makes him convinced that if he achieves his goal, he will become the center of attention. Izuku engages in One For All training with All Might, who teaches him to use One For All to control wind pressure, granting him ranged attacks. Later, Eri arrives at U.A. wearing a cute set of clothes with Mirio and Aizawa. Meanwhile, Gentle plans for his next attack to serve as an "alarm bell" to all of society.
83	20	"Gold Tips Imperial"; Transliteration: "Gōrudo Tippusu Inperiaru" (Japanese: ゴールドティップスインペリアル)	Masashi Abe	Naomi Nakayama	February 29, 2020	April 19, 2020 (Note: Adult Swim moved My Hero Academia from 11:30 p.m. to 12:00 a.m. EDT/PDT, making the air dates from episodes 83 onward effectively Sunday.)	4.4%
Class 1-A is excited as they plan a musical concert. Eri arrives at U.A., with Izuku and Mirio showing her around campus at Aizawa's request since due to her being separated from society for years, suddenly thrusting her into a big social event like a school festival might be a bit too much for her. The three continue with the tour, seeing other students working hard on their respective projects for the festival until they decide to go to the Lunch Rush Cafeteria. As this happens, Nezu assures Izuku that the staff has worked hard to prevent villain attacks during the festival, but warns that if an alarm goes off, they would be forced to evacuate and cancel the event. A week passes and Mina tells Izuku that he is fired from the dance team. Izuku is shocked, but fortunately, Mina is just tricking him and clarifies that he has been asked to join the effects team instead since they are worried that people will eventually get bored of Yuga being the disco ball and Koji suggested the idea of the Aoyama-ball moving in all directions, so Izuku is requested to maneuver Yuga during the performance. Meanwhile, Gentle Criminal and La Brava are planning to infiltrate the U.A. High on the day of the festival, to encourage the students to be on guard at all times.
84	21	"Deku vs. Gentle Criminal"; Transliteration: "Deku bāsasu Jentoru Kuriminaru" (Japanese: デクVSジェントル・クリミナル)	Shōji Ikeno	Shinji Ishihira	March 7, 2020	April 26, 2020 (Note: Due to the COVID-19 pandemic, Funimation began adding a disclaimer at the beginning of episodes stating that the English dub voice actors were able to record their lines from the safety of their homes.)	4.6%
In the gymnasium, Class 1-A is making their final preparations for their musical performance before the day of the school festival, with Mina working hard to have the dance choreograph precisely. In Heights Alliance, some of the students cannot sleep from how nervous and excited they are. Meanwhile, Izuku is again training with All Might when a scruffy Mei shows up and gives him the support equipment he requested: a pair of Air Force Gloves. She also made sure the design went with Izuku's hero costume. Izuku thanks her for making the gloves, and All Might is impressed by how compact they are. Izuku does the last minute preparations for the school festival and the chance to see Eri's smile. But he unexpectedly runs into Gentle and La Brava, who plan to begin their assault then. He recognizes them from the videos he is seen online, and both Gentle and La Brava recognizes Izuku from the sports festival. To prevent the school fest from being cancelled, Izuku decides to defeat them solo before the festival begins. Despite Gentle using his Elasticity Quirk to make the surroundings and the air itself elastic, Izuku refuse to give up, leading La Brava to suggest to Gentle that they should use her Quirk. Note: Due to the COVID-19 pandemic, Funimation did a disclaimer at the beginning of the episode stating that the English dub voice actors were able to record their lines from the safety of their homes. This disclaimer was present for the remaining episodes of this season.
85	22	"School Festival Start!!"; Transliteration: "Kaisai Bunkasai!!" (Japanese: 開催文化祭!!)	Miwa Sasaki	Miwa Sasaki	March 14, 2020	May 3, 2020	4.1%
As the school festival was about to begin, Izuku faces off against Gentle Criminal, who proves an even match with his Elasticity Quirk. Using ranged attacks, he is able to subdue the two villains. Despite his efforts, Gentle cannot break free of Izuku's grasp. Seeing this, La Brava begins to remember her past. Gentle accepted her for who she was, and when he decided to team up with her he gave her the name of La Brava. Back at present, after whispering that La Brava loves Gentle so much, she uses her Love Quirk to temporarily strengthen him and nearly overwhelms Izuku. As the battle with Gentle continues, Izuku is determined to save the festival especially Eri's heart: Gentle thinks back to his youth. He desired to a hero despite not having good enough gardes to be one. After trying to save someone in danger he ended up interfering a hero and causing the person savorily injured and was charged with obstructing justice. As well as facing harassment and being expelled from school, his parents were buried in dept because of his actions leading them to disown him. Years later, after an old classmate who became a pro hero failed to recognize him, Gentle became a villain out of fear of living a life unknown by anyone. La Brava pulls out her laptop and runs off to hack the security system, but she is out of range and tries to proceed further and she notices Hound Dog and several clones of Ectoplasm close by. Izuku ends the fight by taking down Gentle with a St. Louis Smash, as La Brava's Quirk expires. As Izuku apprehends them and Hound Dog catches their scent, Gentle sends Izuku away, surrendering to him and Ectoplasm in an attempt to cover for La Brava.
86	23	"Let It Flow! School Festival!"; Transliteration: "Tare Nagase! Bunkasai!" (Japanese: 垂れ流せ！文化祭！)	Shōji Ikeno	Shinji Satō	March 21, 2020	May 17, 2020 (Note: Episode 86 was delayed from airing on Adult Swim on the night of May 9/10, 2020, due to production complications for Funimation's English dub caused by the COVID-19 pandemic. Episode 85 reran in its place.)	3.8%
Gentle Criminal accepts defeat and is apprehended by Hound Dog and Ectoplasm. Izuku rushes to retrieve his supplies with help from one of Ectoplasm's clones and rejoin the festival in time. He makes it in time for Class 1-A to do their concert, with Jiro doing a performance of her original song, "Hero too" with the help from the class. The performance is loved by all, including Eri, who smiles for the first time in her life. The school festival continues with Class 1-B putting on its stage play with the audience enjoying it despite being a mishmash of several famous works. At the beauty pageant, the participants battle it out for the title, with Nejire takes the victory after gaining the most votes while the two-time winner Bibimi Kenranzaki of Class 3-G humbly accepting her defeat. As the festival comes to a close, Eri feels a little sad as she was about to leave until Izuku gives her a favorite food that she wants: a homemade candy apple, where he had cooked himself much to Eri's glee. Izuku waves goodbye to them as Aizawa and Mirio escort Eri back to the hospital. In the post-credits scene, La Brava and Gentle are offered chances to redeem themselves by the police where La Brava is interrogated by two police detectives while Gentle Criminal is interrogated by the gorilla detective Gori. Gori tells Gentle that since he turn himself in he still has a chance to turn his life around. When Gori asks if he would like some tea, Gentle states that he will take earl grey. Gori states that he will get whatever tea they have.
87	24	"Japanese Hero Billboard Chart"; Transliteration: "Hīrō Birubōdo Chāto Jeipī (Note: Hero Billboard Chart JP)" (Japanese: ヒーロービルボードチャートJP)	Masashi Abe	Naomi Nakayama	March 28, 2020	June 21, 2020 (Note: Episode 87 was delayed from airing on Adult Swim for four weeks due to production complications for Funimation's English dub caused by the COVID-19 pandemic. Episodes 84–86 reran for first three weeks and a fan favorite episode ran on the fourth week.)	6.0%
At the end of November, it is revealed that Eri will be staying at U.A. under the watch of Aizawa and the Big Three. Aizawa informs them that Eri is transferring to U.A. since she cannot stay in the hospital, and he goes outside with the students while Nejire is taking care of Eri. Also, Mirio reveals that Eri's horn is the source of her Rewind Quirk, and has started to grow a bit. Meanwhile, the Wild Wild Pussycats along with Kota, visits Class 1-A. Izuku greets Kota, mentioning that he still keeps the letter that he wrote to him. Mandalay shows Izuku the new shoes Kota bought which are the exact same kind of red shoes he wears, much to Kota's embarrassment. Elsewhere, the first Japanese Hero Billboard Chart since All Might's retirement begins its broadcast from Kamino Ward. The new Number One Hero is revealed to be Endeavor. Meanwhile, Dabi sends an intelligent High-End Nomu named Hood to hunt down Endeavor, along with Hawks, the new number 2 hero, whom he had a meeting about the future of hero society. As the two had finished their conversation, Hood suddenly crashes through the glass windows and Endeavor challenges the creature to face him.
88	25	"His Start"; Transliteration: "Hajimarino" (Japanese: 始まりの)	Tetsuya Miyanishi	Tetsuya Miyanishi	April 4, 2020	June 28, 2020	5.6%
Endeavor and Hawks fight against the High-End Nomu. Endeavor struggles to hold his own against it, as its regeneration, strength and speed are formidable, while Hawks uses his Fierce Wings Quirk to keep bystanders out of trouble. Hood grievously injures the left side of Endeavor's face, seemingly defeating him. Citizens try to flee in a panic, fearing that there is no longer any hope without All Might. Despite his injuries, Endeavor continues fighting, and with Hawks' help, incinerates the High-End high above the city. Though severely wounded, Endeavor imitates All Might's pose which is a sign of his start, as onlookers cheer for him. In a post-credits scene, Izuku has a mysterious dream where he encounters the previous users of One For All, including the first, who is the younger brother of All For One. As their hands meet, Izuku suddenly awakens and damaged the room with his hand glowing on One For All's power.

== Home video release ==
=== Japanese ===
Toho released the fourth season of the anime on DVD and Blu-ray in six volumes in Japan, with the first volume released on January 22, 2020, and the final volume released on August 19, 2020.

Toho Animation (Japan – Region 2/A)
Volume	Episodes	Release date	Ref.
1	64–68	January 22, 2020	
2	69–72	February 19, 2020	
3	73–76	March 18, 2020	
4	77–80	April 15, 2020	
5	81–84	May 20, 2020	
6	85–88	August 19, 2020	

=== English ===
Funimation released the fourth season in North America in two volumes, with the first volume released on September 29, 2020, and the second volume on February 16, 2021. The complete parts of two volumes received a Blu-ray release on February 15, 2022.

Funimation (North America – Region 1/A)
Part		Episodes	Release date	Ref.
Season 4	1	64–76	September 29, 2020	
Season 4	2	77–88	February 16, 2021	
Season 4	Complete	64–88	February 15, 2022	

Madman Entertainment (Australia and New Zealand – Region 4/B)
Part		Episodes	Release date	Ref.
Season 4	1	64–76	December 9, 2020	
Season 4	2	77–88	April 21, 2021	
