= Massara (song) =

2019 song by Kana-Boon

- The standard edition cover

Single by Kana-Boon
- Language: Japanese
- A-side: "Massara"
- B-side: "FLYERS"
- Released: June 12, 2019
- Genre: Rock
- Length: 8:13
- Label: Ki/oon Music
- Songwriter: Maguro Taniguchi

Kana-Boon singles chronology
"Haguruma" (2019)	"Massara" (2019)	"Starmarker" (2020)

Alternative cover
- The first pressing limited edition cover

"Massara" (Japanese: まっさら), officially translated into English as "Brand-new", is a song by Japanese rock band Kana-Boon. It was released as the band's fourteenth major-label single on June 12, 2019, through Ki/oon Music. "Massara" was used as the opening theme song for the anime series Sarazanmai, while its B-side track "FLYERS" was used as an image song for the smartphone game Kick-Flight.

== Background ==
On March 7, 2019, the official website of Sarazanmai announced that Kana-Boon would be performing the opening theme song for the anime series. The song was written by Kana-Boon's singer and guitarist Maguro Taniguchi specifically for the show.

On writing the song, Taniguchi commented the song's main theme was "connections", specifically forging new connections and rekindling broken connections. The song was also written as part of the band's fifth anniversary of debuting under a major label.

On April 25, 2019, video game developer Grenge announced that the B-side track "FLYERS" would be used as an image song for a promotional video for its smartphone game Kick-Flight. The promotional video, animated by MAPPA, was released on June 5, 2019, with Taniguchi commenting that he was excited as the video looked like an anime opening, and he was looking forward to playing the game.

== Release and reception ==
The single was released in two editions, a standard edition and a first pressing limited edition. The first pressing limited edition includes a DVD containing footage from Kana-Boon's fifth-anniversary tour "Kana-Boon no GO! GO! 5-Shūnen! Season 4 One-Man Tour "Let's go 55 ONE-MAAN!!" Yokohama Bay Hall Kōen" (KANA-BOONのGO!GO!5周年！シーズン4 ワンマンツアー『Let's go 55 ONE-MAAN!!』Yokohama Bay Hall公演).

The single reached number 25 on the Oricon charts, 68 on the Japan Hot 100, and 8 on the Japan Hot Animation charts.

== Music video ==
The music video for "Massara" was released on June 12, 2019, and is directed by Satoshi Watanabe.

== Track listing ==
All tracks are written by Maguro Taniguchi.

Standard Edition
No.	Title	Length
1.	"Massara" (まっさら)	4:54
2.	"FLYERS"	3:19
Total length:		8:13

First Pressing Limited Edition (DVD) ("Kana-Boon no GO! GO! 5-Shūnen! Season 4 One-Man Tour "Let's go 55 ONE-MAAN!!" Yokohama Bay Hall Kōen")
No.	Title	Length
1.	"- Introduction -"
2.	"1.2. step to you"
3.	"Time Out" (タイムアウト)
4.	"Destruction Beat Music" (ディストラクションビートミュージック)
5.	"Kurakushon" (クラクション)
6.	"talking"
7.	"Kesshōsei" (結晶星)
8.	"Fighter"
9.	"Samayō Hibi to Fanfare" (彷徨う日々とファンファーレ)
10.	"Yoru no Madobe kara" (夜の窓辺から)
11.	"Nerine" (ネリネ)
12.	"Tour Documentary Eizō" (ツアードキュメンタリー映像)

== Charts ==
Chart (2020)	Peak positions
Japan Weekly Singles (Oricon)	25
Japan Hot 100 (Billboard)	68
Japan Hot Animation (Billboard)	8

== Release history ==
Region	Date	Label	Format	Catalog
Japan	June 12, 2019	Ki/oon Music	CD	KSCL-3162
Japan	June 12, 2019	Ki/oon Music	CD+DVD	KSCL-3160~1
