= Starmarker =

2020 song by Kana-Boon

- The regular edition cover

Single by Kana-Boon
- Language: Japanese
- A-side: "Starmarker"
- B-side: "Shutter Gate" "You Estas"
- Released: March 4, 2020
- Genre: Rock
- Label: Ki/oon Music
- Songwriter: Maguro Taniguchi

Kana-Boon singles chronology
| "Massara" (2019) | "Starmarker" (2020) | "Torch of Liberty" (2020) |

Alternative cover
- The limited anime edition cover

Music video
- "Starmarker" on YouTube

"Starmarker" (Japanese: スターマーカー) (Note: The music video and Funimation's home video release of My Hero Academia uses the title "Starmaker".) is a song by Japanese rock band Kana-Boon. It was released as the band's fifteenth major-label single, released on March 4, 2020, through Ki/oon Music. "Starmarker" was used as the second opening theme song for the fourth season of the anime series My Hero Academia.

== Release and reception ==
On January 4, 2020, the combined 6th and 7th issue of the 2020 release of Weekly Shōnen Jump announced that Kana-Boon would be performing the second opening theme for the fourth season My Hero Academia. The single was released on March 4, 2020, with a standard edition and an anime limited edition release. The anime limited edition release contains additional tracks, and a bonus DVD with the creditless version of the respective opening theme of My Hero Academia. The single was released on the same day as Kana-Boon's "best of" album Kana-Boon The Best.

The song is the first song performed by Kana-Boon after the departure of bassist Yuuma Meshida in 2019. As a result, lead vocalist and guitarist Maguro Taniguchi also performs the bass. The song "Starmarker" features Fujifabric keyboardist Daisuke Kanazawa as a guest musician.

The single reached number 29 on the Oricon charts, 46 on the Japan Hot 100, and 7 on the Japan Hot Animation charts.

== Music video ==
The music video for "Starmarker" was released on March 2, 2020, and directed by Hidenobu Tanabe. It features Kana-Boon, alongside an actor wearing a reflective zentai outfit. The video is split vertically into thirds, in front of a living room, a kitchen, and a bedroom entrance. Throughout the video, either one member, the entire band, the zentai actor, or various objects are shown within each third. The band members can also be seen holding the various objects with varying facial expressions, within each third. The zentai actor then dances and mimes in front of, and behind, each band member.

== Track listing ==
All tracks are written by Maguro Taniguchi.

Standard Edition
| No. | Title | Length |
|---|---|---|
| 1. | "Starmarker" (スターマーカー) | 3:35 |
| 2. | "Shutter Gate" (シャッターゲート) | 4:25 |
| 3. | "You Estas" (ユーエスタス) | 3:57 |
| Total length: | | 11:57 |

Anime Limited Edition
| No. | Title | Length |
|---|---|---|
| 4. | "Starmarker (Anime Size)" (スターマーカー (Anime Size)) | 1:33 |
| 5. | "Starmarker (Instrumental)" (スターマーカー (Instrumental)) | 3:35 |
| 6. | "Starmarker (Anime Size Instrumental)" (スターマーカ (Anime Size Instrumental)) | 1:29 |

Anime Limited Edition (DVD)
| No. | Title | Length |
|---|---|---|
| 1. | "TV Anime My Hero Academia Non-credit Opening Movie" (TVアニメ「僕のヒーローアカデミア」ノンクレジットオープニングムービー) | 1:40 |

== Charts ==
| Chart (2020) | Peak positions |
|---|---|
| Japan Weekly Singles (Oricon) | 29 |
| Japan Hot 100 (Billboard) | 46 |
| Japan Hot Animation (Billboard) | 7 |

== Release history ==
| Region | Date | Label | Format | Catalog |
|---|---|---|---|---|
| Japan | March 4, 2020 | Ki/oon Music | CD | KSCL-3240 |
| Japan | March 4, 2020 | Ki/oon Music | CD+DVD | KSCL-3241 |
