= Torch of Liberty =

2020 song by Kana-Boon

Single by Kana-Boon
- Language: Japanese
- A-side: "Torch of Liberty"
- B-side: "Sentinel"; "Magic Hour"
- Released: November 25, 2020
- Genre: Rock
- Length: 11:09
- Label: Ki/oon Music
- Songwriter: Maguro Taniguchi

Kana-Boon singles chronology
"Starmarker" (2020)	"Torch of Liberty" (2020)	"Re:Pray" (2021)

Music video
- "Torch of Liberty" on YouTube

"Torch of Liberty" is a song by Japanese rock band Kana-Boon. It was released as the band's sixteenth major-label single, released on November 25, 2020, through Ki/oon Music. "Torch of Liberty" was used as the second opening theme song for the second season of the Fire Force anime television series.

== Background ==
On September 26, 2020, the official website for the Fire Force anime announced the opening and ending themes for the second cour of the second season of the anime, with Kana-Boon performing the opening theme. Kana-Boon's singer and guitarist Maguro Taniguchi also produced the ending theme "Desire" by Pelican Fanclub.

On writing the song, Taniguchi commented that "liberation" was the main theme of the song, due to "liberation" and flames being a major theme within the series, and signifying lost freedoms and everyday life.

== Release and reception ==
The single was released on November 25, 2020, in three releases, a standard edition, a first pressing limited edition, and an anime limited edition release. The first pressing limited edition contains a bonus DVD with footage of the band performing live at the "Kana-Boon's "Pre" Best Live" event on July 26, 2020. The anime limited edition contains artwork from the anime, the anime size bonus tracks, as well as a bonus DVD containing the creditless version of the respective opening theme of "Fire Force", as well as the music video for "Torch of Liberty". The single was made available to stream on October 17, 2020.

The single reached number 38 on the Oricon charts, and reached 38 on the Billboard Japan Top Singles Sales.

== Music video ==
The music video for "Torch of Liberty" was released on November 13, 2020, and directed by Hiroki Nakamura. The video is shot in the 4:3 aspect ratio, with retro-style titles and filters used throughout the video, and heavily utilises overhead and birds-eye view shots. The video starts with Maguro Taniguchi playing the guitar on grass, and then the band playing their instruments in various locations, and in front of mirrors. Sweeping pans of various people are shown alongside various items, such as a red car, inflatable pool, and a drone. Various sources of light, such as a flare, car headlights, an open fire, and a torch, are shown interspersed in the video.

== Track listing ==
All tracks are written by Maguro Taniguchi.

Standard Edition
No.	Title	Length
1.	"Torch of Liberty"	3:06
2.	"Sentinel" (センチネル)	3:58
3.	"Magic Hour" (マジックアワー)	4:05
Total length:		11:09

Anime Limited Edition
No.	Title	Length
4.	"Torch of Liberty (Anime Size)"	1:32
5.	"Torch of Liberty (Anime Size Instrumental)"	1:30

Anime Limited Edition (DVD)
No.	Title	Length
1.	""Fire Force" Second Season Second Cour Non-credit Opening Movie" (「炎炎ノ消防隊 弐ノ章」第2クール ノンクレジットオープニングムービー)
2.	""Torch of Liberty" Music Video" (「Torch of Liberty」Music Video)

First Pressing Limited Edition (DVD) (Kana-Boon's "Pre" Best Live)
No.	Title	Length
1.	"- Introduction -"
2.	"Naimononedari" (ないものねだり)
3.	"Sakura no Uta" (さくらのうた)
4.	"Wally Hero" (ウォーリーヒーロー)
5.	"Full Drive" (フルドライブ)
6.	"Destruction Beat Music" (ディストラクションビートミュージック)
7.	"Slihouette" (シルエット)
8.	"Baton Road" (バトンロード)
9.	"Massara" (まっさら)
10.	"Starmarker" (スターマーカー)
11.	"Haru o Matte" (春を待って)
12.	"- Conclusion -"

== Charts ==
Chart (2020)	Peak positions
Japan Weekly Singles (Oricon)	38
Japan Top Singles Sales (Billboard)	38

== Release history ==
Region	Date	Label	Format	Catalog
Japan	November 25, 2020	Ki/oon Music	CD	KSCL-3267
Japan	November 25, 2020	Ki/oon Music	CD+DVD	KSCL-3265/5
Japan	November 25, 2020	Ki/oon Music	CD+DVD	KSCL-3268/9
