= List of Fire Force characters =

A selection of the characters from the series

The manga series Fire Force features an extensive cast of characters created by Atsushi Ohkubo. Although native form of Japanese name follows the Eastern name order (family name, given name), the characters names in the series follow the Western name order (given name, family name). For example in Shinra Kusakabe (森羅 日下部), where the given name, Shinra (森羅), is written before the surname, Kusakabe (日下部).

== Special Fire Force ==
Special Fire Force (特殊消防隊, Tokushu Shōbōtai), also nicknamed Blue Stripes (青線, Aosen), are a firefighting force that was originally formed by members of The Fire Defense Agency, Tokyo Army and The Holy Sol Temple. All eight brigades investigate the Human Combustion Phenomenon and eliminate Infernals whom they administer last rites to.

=== Special Fire Force Company 8 ===
Special Fire Force Company 8 (第8特殊消防隊, Dai Hachi Tokushu Shōbōtai) is a Special Fire Force located in Tokyo, having the fewest resources and members since it was formed in a rush compared to the other Special Fire Force Companies. While having the same task as the other branches, Company 8's has an additional mission in the observation of the other companies in case any of them are hiding vital information from the entire organization for personal reasons. This allowed them to learn of the White Clad's existence and seek to prevent them from realizing their goals.

Shinra Kusakabe (森羅 日下部)
Voiced by: Gakuto Kajiwara, Maaya Sakamoto (young) (Japanese); Derick Snow, Jenny Ledel (young) (English)
Shinra is a Second Class Fire Soldier who joined the Special Fire Force Company 8 to save people as a hero while uncovering the cause of fire that destroyed his family twelve years earlier. The ordeal also caused Shinra to be prone to involuntarily grinning when upset, making him appear menacing while learning to control it. As a third generation case of Spontaneous Human Combustion, his Pyrokinesis, nicknamed the Devil's Footprints (悪魔の足跡, Akuma no Ashiato), enables him to generate and unleash powerful continuous flame bursts from his feet to propel himself or execute powerful kicks. His powers are further enhanced when the Adolla Burst awakened within him, making him able to move at the speed of light while momentarily dissolving his body, thus being revealed as the Fourth of the Eight Pillars that the Evangelist seeks and making him a fourth generation as well. He later trains himself to use that power and his Adolla Link, gradually learning that he was a product of humanity's subconscious desire to oppose the Evangelist while representing humanity’s rage as the Fourth Pillar. He eventually defeats the Evangelist by developing Soul Resonance to use with the perception-altering powers of Adolla to temporary absorb his family to become Shinrabashoman and reboots the world into one ruled by his creation Shinigami, who created Death the Kid in his image years later.
Akitaru Ōbi (秋樽 桜備)
Voiced by: Kazuya Nakai (Japanese); Jeremy Inman (English)
Battalion Captain of Company 8, he is a role-model firefighter and despite being one of its non-powered members, he is at peak human condition and more than willing to get up close and personal with Infernals while battling them, even physically grappling with them at times despite the high risk to himself. Normally calm and cheerful, he can turn furious in an instant should he encounter someone toying with human life. He is also well aware that "putting to rest" Infernals was just a better alternative for the word "killing", thus he warns the younger members of Company 8 never to display their weapons in public, especially when an Infernal's next of kin is around.
Takehisa Hinawa (武久 火縄)
Voiced by: Kenichi Suzumura (Japanese); Christopher Wehkamp (English)
Company 8 Lieutenant and a second generation who manipulates his flames through the use of his firearms. He controls the power, speed, and trajectory of the bullets he fires to the point where he can turn the damage output of a normal bullet into that of a tank shell. An extremely intimidating character, he is stoic, strict, and blunt with his words but does care for his allies as shown with his interactions with Shinra after the latter reveals his younger brother's role within the enemy group and is surprisingly a good cook. During his time in the Tokyo Army, he encountered Maki, whom he would later recruit into Fire Force Company 8 after leaving the military, and witnessed the death of his best friend who had suddenly transformed into an Infernal.
Maki Oze (茉希 尾瀬)
Voiced by: Saeko Kamijō (Japanese); Sarah Roach (English)
A second generation who was a member of the Tokyo army before joining the Special Fire Force to better help others. Her father is General Danrou Oze of the Tokyo Imperial Armed Forces and her brother Tagaki is a 1st Lieutenant of the Criminal Investigation Division. While an experienced combatant, Maki uses her second generation powers to create living fireballs which also use to power her Iron Owl projectile weapons. Apart from that, she is also able to control flames from a long distance, allowing her to extinguish, absorb, or force away any form of fire. While she has a gentle demeanor, she can snap if someone comments on her being un-feminine due to her muscular physique, and she is inclined to react aggressively.
Iris (アイリス, Airisu)
Voiced by: M.A.O (Japanese); Alexis Tipton (English)
One of the two surviving nuns of St. Raffles Convent fire, Iris is a follower of the Holy Sol Temple who joined Company 8 as a medic and is one of its non-powered members. She is adamant in her faith and usually gives prayers to dying Infernals as her way of easing their last moments of suffering. She is also trained in basic first aid. Iris is later revealed by Sister Sumire to be the First Pillar's Doppelgänger, resulting in her gradual awakening as the Eighth Pillar who embodies humanity’s despair.
Arthur Boyle (アーサー・ボイル, Āsā Boiru)
Voiced by: Yūsuke Kobayashi, Yuka Terasaki (young) (Japanese); Eric Vale, Megan Shipman (young) (English)
Arthur is an oblivious third generation with delusions of being a knight king, abandoned by his parents who left to travel the world after their small restaurant burned to the ground. Arthur is an exceptionally strong Fire Soldier due to his Ignition Ability to fabricate and control plasma is fueled by his delusions, becoming more powerful the more detached from reality he is. He channels that power through a sword hilt medium he calls Excalibur, allowing him to cut, wield, and manipulate electricity. His name and abilities are inspired by the legendary British ruler King Arthur.
Arthur developed a bitter rivalry with Shinra back in their training days that continued after joining the same company and toned down to a more friendly one. During the final battle against the White Clad, his delusions augmented by Adola leaking from the Great Cataclysm, Arthur defeats Dragon in an epic battle that ends with him fatally wounded and drifting out of Earth's orbit while unknowingly infusing life into Excalibur.
Tamaki Kotatsu (環 古達)
Voiced by: Aoi Yūki (Japanese); Jad Saxton (English)
Formerly a Fire Soldier and sister of Company 1 until her being an unwitting accessory to Rekka Hoshimiya's crimes got her transferred to Company 8 following her suspension. Tamaki is a third generation whose Ignition Ability, nicknamed "Nekomata" generates pink flames around her in the shape of cat features which she can use for close-range combat or as a signal flare. She has feelings for Shinra after the latter saved her from Rekka. She is cursed to be involved in uncomfortable situations to which she calls "Lucky Lecher Lure Syndrome", which serves as a running gag in the series.
Viktor Licht (ヴィクトル・リヒト, Vikutoru Rihito)
Voiced by: Daisuke Sakaguchi (Japanese); Ian Sinclair (English)
Originally Head of Incendiary Research at Haijima Industries before being assigned a position in Company 8 by a government order. Viktor is a brilliant scientist obsessed with the Adolla Burst, and his quest for scientific truth does not deter him from helping Haijima Industries, his new comrades in Company 8, nor prevent him from associating with Joker.
Vulcan Joseph (ヴァルカン・ジョゼフ, Varukan Jozefu)
Voiced by: Taku Yashiro (Japanese); Jason Liebrecht (English)
An engineer famously known as the God of Fire and Smithing (炎と鍛冶の神, Honō To Kaji No Kami), his family having a bitter history with Haijima Industries as they developed the Amaterasu reactor and severed ties with the company upon learning its power source. While raised to believe the company stole his family’s Amaterasu plans, Vulcan’s grudge towards Haijima worsened by his grandfather's apprentice Dr. Giovanni working for the company around his grandfather and father mysteriously became Infernals. Vulcan originally wanted nothing to do with the Fire Force and turn down Giovanni's numerous recruitment attempts. It was only after Giovanni stole the Key to Amaterasu which his family guarded for ages that Vulcan breaks his vow and becomes Fire Force Company 8's mechanic to protect his new family and settle things with Giovanni.
Lisa Isaribe (リサ・漁辺, Risa Isaribe)
Voiced by: Ayaka Asai (Japanese); Elizabeth Maxwell (English)
Previously an Ashen Flame member under Dr. Giovanni who was code-named Feeler (フィラー, Firā), relating to her ability as a Third Generation pyrokinetic to manifest tentacles for various purposes. Traumatized from watching her parents killed by an Infernal, her powers awakened by an Infernal Bug, she created the Lisa Isaribe identity to infiltrate Vulcan's home and find the Key to Amaterasu before exposing herself after her superior decided to get the item personally. Lisa resumed her Ashen Knight duties until Company 8 ventures into the Netherworld, used by Giovanni as a hostage before abandoning her. She joins the Fire Force company 8 soon after, later overcoming her fear of Giovanni to help Vulcan fight him.
Yū (ユウ)
Voiced by: Shōya Chiba (Japanese); Kristen McGuire (English)
Yū is a young boy who works as Vulcan's apprentice in his workshop. When Shinra, Arthur, and Iris try to see Vulcan, they are turned away, but Yū listens to their story and decides to let them in to see Vulcan. Later, Giovanni attacks Yū in order get Vulcan to give him the key to Amaterasu. After the attack, Yū is sent to the hospital to recover and joins Vulcan in Fire Force Company 8 afterwards. During the final battle, Giovanni implanted a parasitic insect into Yū‘s body and takes over after his previous body was destroyed by Vulcan. But Yū is saved by Arthur removing the parasite without any damage on Yū‘s brain.

=== Special Fire Force Company 1 ===
Special Fire Force Company 1 (第1特殊消防隊, Dai Ichi Tokushu Shōbōtai) is an elite group composed mostly of Holy Sol Temple members with jurisdiction in the Shinjuku District, the religious faith later revealed to have connections to the White Clad.

Leonard Burns (レオナルド・バーンズ, Reonarudo Bānzu)
Voiced by: Taiten Kusunoki, Minami Hinata^{Ep. 54 credits} (young) (Japanese); Phil Parsons, Hollis Beck (young) (English)
Battalion Commander of Company 1 who saved Shinra when his mother turned into an Infernal and concealed the truth from him, gradually revealing the event was being caused by the Evangelist. He also wears an eyepatch over his right eye as the result of experiencing an Adolla Link when Joker was his ward, destroying his faith in the Holy Sol Temple as attempted to learn more from researching the long forgotten Netherworld. Later crossing paths with Joker, he redirects him to investigate Haijima Industries for clues of the conspiracy within the Tokyo Empire. After being forced by the Holy See and emperor to work with the Knights of the Ashen Flame, Burns arrests Obi with the intent of turning him into an Infernal. But Burns is defeated by Shinra with Joker supporting the latter, leaving him open to be attacked by a doppelgänger Infernal manifesting from his shadow.
Karim Flam (カリム・フラム, Karimu Furamu)
Voiced by: Kazuyuki Okitsu (Japanese); Ricco Fajardo (English)
A Second Generation whose ability is to convert heat energy into sound energy via a special music instrument which he can then convert into ice which he uses to attack or freeze an opponent. He has an odd speech pattern wherein he uses the same or a similar word as both a verb and a noun in the same sentence (ex. "this trouble is quite troubling"), but is determined and dedicated to the Fire Force's cause.
Huo Yan Li (フォイェン・リィ, Foyen Rī)
Voiced by: Satoshi Hino (Japanese); Josh Bangle (English)
The main priest of Company 1 who was injured by Arrow in the line of duty. Huo Yan is a Third Generation pyrokinetic which grants him the ability to generate his own flames. Using hand-to-hand combat in conjunction with his Ignition Ability, he is capable of killing Infernal's with ease, using very quick and precise movements. He has shown to be a powerful combatant despite having lost his right arm.
Onyango (オニャンゴ)
Voiced by: Katsuhisa Hōki (Japanese); Rick Keeling (English)
A retired Fire Soldier who resumed his position in Company 1 following Rekka's death and Li's injury. Despite being forced out of retirement, Onyango is perfectly willing to embrace his old role. Even ready to take part in a photo-shoot for the Firefighter’s Calendar. His relationship with Leonard Burns means that Onyango has a great understanding of what drives the enigmatic and stoic captain, while Burns and the other members of Company 1 appear to hold him in a high regard. Onyango alongside Company 1 and Leonard, attended the incident involving Mari Kusakabe's house being on fire.

=== Special Fire Force Company 2 ===
Special Fire Force Company 2 (第2特殊消防隊, Dai Ni Tokushu Shōbōtai) is composed of militants who answer to the Tokyo Armed Forces.

Gustav Honda (グスタフ 本田, Gusutafu Honda)
Voiced by: Takaya Hashi (seasons 1–3), Samurai Dayu^{Ep. 73 credits} (Japanese); Brian Mathis (English)
The Battalion Commander of Company 2 and a Third Generation who can produce flames from his scalp, making his headbutts incredibly destructive.
Takeru Noto (武 能登)
Voiced by: Katsuyuki Konishi (Japanese); Cris George (English)
A Third Generation pyrokinetic from the Chinese Peninsula is also called Juggernaut because of his huge padded uniform. He can form his flames into various forms of weaponry, usually explosives like missiles. Ironically, he is pyrophobic despite having powers and only enlisted in the Fire Force as a means of overcoming his fears.

=== Special Fire Force Company 3 ===
Special Fire Force Company 3 (第3特殊消防隊, Dai San Tokushu Shōbōtai) is one of two Fire Force Companies that is heavily influenced by Haijima Industries. The most corrupted and callous Fire Force Company out of the eight, it was infiltrated by agents of the Evangelist (led by Dr. Giovanni) until the latter was forced to flee. The scandal was covered up by Haijima Industries, but many members of Company 3 left to follow Dr. Giovanni, implying that majority of its members were infiltrators.

=== Special Fire Force Company 4 ===
Special Fire Force Company 4 (第4特殊消防隊, Dai Yon Tokushu Shōbōtai) answers to the Fire Defense Agency and is initially structured like a normal fire brigade while supervising the Special Fire Force Training School.

Sōichirō Hague (蒼一郎・アーグ, Sōichirō Āgu)
Voiced by: Chō (Japanese); Philip Weber (English)
Battalion Commander of Company 4. Formerly a skilled and devoted Fire Soldier, the Adolla Link he experienced two years prior warped his personality into one of instability and masochism, obsessed with experiencing Adolla again. He is targeted by the White-Clad due to his link, and is eventually murdered by them.
Purt Co Pan (パーン, Pān)
Voiced by: Daisuke Ono (Japanese); Robert McCollum (English)
An instructor at the Special Fire Brigade Training School and a Third Generation who can increase people's heat resistance.
Ogun Montgomery (オグン・モンゴメリ, Ogun Mongomeri)
Voiced by: Makoto Furukawa (Japanese); Zeno Robinson (English)
A Third Generation and classmate of both Shinra and Arthur, his Ignition Ability allows him to create fire spears and literally tattoo fire onto his own body to augment his physical abilities.

=== Special Fire Force Company 5 ===
Special Fire Force Company 5 (第5特殊消防隊, Dai Go Tokushu Shōbōtai) is one of two Fire Force Companies that is heavily influenced by Haijima Industries due to the research conducted by Hibana. It is stationed at the 5th Special Fire Fighting Industrial Complex in Tokyo.

Princess Hibana (プリンセス 火華, Purinsesu Hibana)
Voiced by: Lynn (Japanese); Colleen Clinkenbeard (English)
Company 5's Battalion Commander and scientist, she is one of the surviving nuns of the St. Raffles Convent fire alongside Iris. Compared to Iris, whom she values as family, the ordeal made Hibana a sadistic atheist as she offered her services to Haijima Industries in order to rise up the ranks. Being initially antagonistic to Company 8 until her defeat by Shinra made her an ally to the group, as well as develop feelings for Shinra. As a third generation kinetic able to manipulate heat, her Ignition Ability "Clematis" (鉄仙, Kuremachisu) allows her to create and manipulate flower-like flames that burn on contact.
Tōru Kishiri (トオル 岸理)
Voiced by: Kengo Kawanishi (Japanese); Kyle Phillips (English)
A sardonic rookie member of Company 5 whose Third Generation pyrokinesis allows him to fill bubblegum balloons with flammable gas, which explode once popped. He calls this his "Backdraft Bubblish Gum." He is also quite resourceful on the battlefield, as he was able to find the perfect hiding spot from which he could attack whilst not being able to be injured by Takehisa Hinawa's bullets.
Tokuyama
Voiced by: Takeo Ōtsuka (Japanese); Jeff Johnson (English)
Conehead (コーンヘッド, Kōnheddo)
Voiced by: Ryou Sugisaki (Japanese); Barry Yandell (English)
3 Angels of the 5th (5thエンジェルス3, 5th Enjurusu 3)
A group of fifteen women that appear in threes, all being identically dressed female Fire Soldiers with one of them being a Third Generation pyrokinetic.
Setsuo Miyamoto (節男 宮本)
Voiced by: Kanehira Yamamoto (Japanese); Brendan Blabler (English)
A murderous firefighter who turned into an Infernal during his trial where he was found innocent, going on a rampage until being defeated by Shinra and taken by Company 5 for experimentation. He later participates in the fight between Companies 5 and 8 where he is destroyed by Arthur.

=== Special Fire Force Company 6 ===
Special Fire Force Company 6 (第6特殊消防隊, Dai Roku Tokushu Shōbōtai) is a branch of the Fire Force which specializes in medical treatment and tends to the care of those with ignition abilities who are injured during their duties.

Kayoko Huang (火代子 黄(ホァン), Kayoko Hoan)
Voiced by: Sayaka Ohara (Japanese); Brianna Roberts (English)
Battalion Commander of Company 6 and a doctor. She is a Third Generation pyrokinetic and uses her Ignition Ability to the create serpent-like flaming Rod of Ascepius so she can heal others of injuries and diseases in addition to eliminating pain felt during the procedure.
Asako Hague (アサコ・アーグ, Asako Āgu)
Voiced by: Hisako Kanemoto (Japanese); Sarah Wiedenheft (English)
Lieutenant and nurse, she is also a Second Generation pyrokinetic, and granddaughter of Sōichirō Hague.

=== Special Fire Force Company 7 ===
Special Fire Force Company 7 (第7特殊消防隊, Dai Shichi Tokushu Shōbōtai) is a branch of Fire Force based in the Asakusa district that started out as a vigilante firefighting corps until they were given official recognition by authorities and reformed into a new Fire Force Company.

Shinmon Benimaru (新門 紅丸)
Voiced by: Mamoru Miyano, Anna Nagase^{Ep. 62 credits} (young) (Japanese); Aaron Roberts, Rowan Gilvie (young) (English)
Battalion Commander of Company 7. He is a hybrid Second and Third Generation with a volatile personality and capable of unleashing devastating fire-power. He normally has a laconic expression and has one concentric circular and one cross-shaped pupil.
Sagamiya Konro (相模屋 紺炉)
Voiced by: Tomoaki Maeno (Japanese); Jeff Plunk (English)
Second in command of Company 7 at the time of its authentication, previously its captain. He suffers from Tephrosis (灰病, Haibyō) which permanently damaged parts of his body through incineration after he absorbed the full force from a Demon-type Infernal, later revealed to be his Doppelgänger, after knocking out Benimaru to keep him out of harm's way.
Hinata & Hikage (ヒナタ＆ヒカゲ)
Voiced by: Hikaru Akao (Japanese); Jennifer Alyx (Hinata), Meg McClain (Hikage) (English)
Twin sisters whose Third Generation pyrokinesis allows them to shroud themselves in fox-like cloaks, cute in appearance yet mischievous in personality with a sadistic streak whenever beating bad guys up.

== Tokyo Empire ==
Raffles III (ラフルス3世, Rafurusu San Sei)
Voiced by: Bin Shimada (Japanese); Steve Powell (English)
The current ruler of the Tokyo Empire, though Burns speculates that it may be an impostor working with the White Clad as Yona assumed the identity of Raffles I to establish the Holy Sol Temple.
Raffles I (ラフルス1世, Rafurusu Ichi Sei)
Voiced by: Mitsuru Ogata^{Ep. 64 credits}
The founding ruler of the Tokyo Empire, mentioned in the Holy Sol scripture to have used the Adolla Burst and Amaterasu to rebuild civilization following the Great Catacylsm. But in reality, his full name Raffles Smith, he was murdered by Yona with the entity assuming his identity and fabricating the story. An Adolla Doppelgänger of Raffles appears as a giant Infernal when the Second Great Cataclysm commences, attacking the city before Shinra kills him.
Takigi Oze (滝義 尾瀬)
Voiced by: Yūki Ono (Japanese); Jonah Scott (English)
Takigi is a Criminal Detective who serves as a First Lieutenant in the Tokyo Army. He is Maki's older brother and a Second-Generation pyrokinetic like her. He is resentful of Company 8 because he fears for his sister's safety.
Danrou Oze (団老 尾瀬)
Voiced by: Tetsu Inada (Japanese); Christopher Sabat (English)
Danrou is a General of the Tokyo Army's Unified Military Operations Department and the intimidating, but loving father of Maki and Takigi Oze.

== Haijima Industries ==
Gureo Haijima (グレオ 灰島, Gureo Haijima)
Voiced by: Nobuo Tobita (Japanese); Bill Jenkins (English)
President of Haijima Industries, the most powerful entity in the Tokyo Empire after the Holy Sol Temple is developed the Amaterasu and controls most of the economy with about 70% of the population under its employ. A shrewd man who neither wastes time or let his feelings cloud his judgment, Gureo is aware of the First Pillar yet makes the Tokyo Empire's prosperity his main priority. He instructs Viktor Licht to spy on Company 8 to observe Shinra, who he requests following the Chinese Peninsula. Following the chaos that later ensured, Gureo agrees to offer his support to Company 8 after they promise to provide him with an alternate power source for the Amaterasu so it would not be powered by a human sacrifice. Despite this, he still wishes to study the Adolla Burst through experimenting on Nataku and Shinra.
Yūichirō Kurono (優一郎 黒野)
Voiced by: Takahiro Sakurai (Japanese); Brandon McInnis (English)
He is a Third Generation pyrokinetic whose main task is testing the pyrokinetic abilities of promising children at Haijima Industries, having a reputation of being utterly insane due to his sheer obsession to brutalize weaklings above everything else. But Yūichirō is tolerated by Haijima for his effectiveness as he ends up becoming an unofficial guardian to Nataku, whom the boy refers to as Uncle Reaper. His lower right arm is carbonised through overheating and he uses it to create and control "black smoke" which he can use to hide himself, detect the movements of opponents or harden into weapons or other objects to attack his opponents.
Puppeteer (人形使い, Ningyōdzukai)
Voiced by: Saori Hayami (Japanese); Monica Rial (English)
She is in charge of educating children who do not yet know how to use their pyrokenetic abilities. She is a second generation pyrokenetic and controls small powerful robotic characters called "Dominions".
Nataku Son (ナタク 孫)
Voiced by: Mutsumi Tamura (Japanese); Corinne Sudberg (English)
Called Tatsu (たつ, Tatsu) by friends, he is a child residing in Tokyo before Rekka subjected him to an Infernal Bug that awakened him into a Third Generation able to ignite his right arm into a claw with his mindset effecting his level of power. He was placed in the custody of Haijima Industries, with the experiments conducted by Kurono and the trauma from his ordeal awakens him as the Sixth Pillar, an embodiment of fear whose Adolla Burst causes him to emit radioactive energy when stressed. When the White Clad attempt to capture Nataku, the stress causes him to emit radioactive energy that is harmful to normal humans and potent enough to destroy the entire Tokyo Empire. Once Nataku is calmed and returned to Hajima, he is placed under Kurono’s care as he is the only adult who does not place impossible standards upon the boy.
Oguro (小黒, Ōguro)
Voiced by: Akira Ishida (Japanese); Nick Huber (English)
Oguro is an executive member of Haijima Industries who is deployed alongside Kurono as his handler, to the first pillar that emerges from the sea.

== White-Clad ==
The White-Clad (白頭巾, Shiro Zukin) are a doomsday cult under the guidance of the Evangelist which has long infiltrated every branch of the Tokyo Empire and the Holy Sol Temple while being the cause of Infernal attacks. The Evangelist's followers are provided with Adolla-infused Infernal Bugs that enter the host and cause them to be merged with a Doppelgänger, a being from the Adolla realm who is a reflection of their human counterpart as society sees them. The result either creates an Infernal or awakens the host's potential as a pyrokinetic with an Adolla Burst. The White Clad's headquarters are located in the Nether, a forbidden area beneath the Tokyo Empire consisting of abandoned subway tunnels where the sun never shines. While Doppelgängers are normally brought to the world via the creation of Infernals through their human counterparts, they can also be summoned through a ritual by the White Clad in their own physical bodies regardless if their human counterpart is alive or dead. They also have three subdivisions, the Knights of the Ashen Flame (灰焔 騎士団, Kaien Kishidan) are the warrior branch initially led by Shō Kusakabe, who is later revealed to be brainwashed by Haumea and the Knights of the Purple Smoke (紫煙 騎士団, Shien Kishidan), a faction within the White-Clad who worked for the Evangelist, who acted under the leadership of Ritsu and the Destroyers (屠リ人, Hofuribito) a faction of the White Clad, that specialises in ability users' assassinations, led by Gold.

The Evangelist (伝導者, Dendōsha)
The Evangelist is a mysterious female entity who is the embodiment of despair that resides in the Adolla realm, suspected to have influenced humanity from the shadows for millennia. She uses the White Clad to gather eight humans who possess the Adolla Burst to repeat the catastrophic event known as the Great Cataclysm (大災害, Daisaigai), in order to turn the earth into a second sun. However, her plan is foiled when Shinra restores the world and destroys her after being purged from Haumea.
Haumea (ハウメア)
Voiced by: Rie Kugimiya (Japanese); Caitlin Glass (English)
Her exact origins unknown, wearing a golden crown over her eyes, Haumea was born with an Adolla Burst in form of hearing humanity's collective unconsciousness, which gradually eroded her sanity, tormented by hearing people’s darkest thoughts. Haumea served the Evangelist as the White Clad’s acting leader and the Second Pillar (二柱目, Nihashira-me), embodying passivity, her Adolla Burst allowing her to manipulate both plasma energy and others’ brainwaves while having a sixth sense that allows her to perceive what occurs in the Adolla Realm. After sensing the manifestation of Burns' Doppelgänger, Haumea instructs the White Clad to kill off every Fire Soldier but the Pillars. As the Great Catalyst begins, Haumea discards her crown while proceeding to sacrifice the Pillars, becoming a vessel to the manifesting Evangelist. However, Shinra manages to convince Haumea to let go of the despair driving her as she is reunited with her long-time guardian Charon.
Shō Kusakabe (象 日下部)
Voiced by: Maaya Sakamoto (Japanese); Justin Briner, Tabitha Ray (young) (English)
The leader of the Knights of the Ashen Flame (灰焔騎士団, Kaien Kishidan), a warrior branch of the White Clad, Shō is Shinra's younger brother who was assumed to have died as a baby twelve years ago. He is revealed to be the Third Pillar (三柱目, Sanhashira-me), embodying apathy, with his Adolla Burst causing the fire that turned Shinra into a third generation and their mother Mari into an Infernal. Shō was abducted by the Knights of the Ashen Flame's leadership, then raised and indoctrinated by the Evangelist. As the Third Pillar, his Adolla Burst allows him to manipulate the universe's thermal expansion, giving the illusion that he can freeze time to a standstill. He eventually escapes Haumea's brainwashing and starts searching for his brother. In the process, he indirectly betrays the group, accompanied by his guardian, Arrow. Upon learning he is a product of humanity's subconscious desire to guide Shinra to his purpose as the hero, Shō allies himself with Shinra to oppose the White Clad.
Dr. Giovanni (Dr.ジョヴァンニ, Dokutā Jovanni)
Voiced by: Yutaka Aoyama (Japanese); Marcus D. Stimac (English)
A plague mask-wearing member of the White Clad, descended from one of the two families that created the Amaterasu reactor per the Evangelist’s design and established Haijima Industries to oversee it after the Joseph family broke ties with them. Having developed an interest in the Infernal Bugs, Giovanni turned himself into an insect creature that uses host bodies to prolong his life so he can witness the world engulfed in Adolla. In his resulting host body, Giovanni posed as an apprentice to Vulcan's grandfather to recover Amaterasu's key from the Joseph family, later working for Haijima while arranging for him and Vulcan's father to be turned into Infernals. Giovanni has used his influence to blacklist Vulcan while infiltrating the Fire Force as Commander of Special Fire Force Company 3 (第3特殊消防隊, Dai San Tokushu Shōbōtai). He joins the White Clad after stealing Amaterasu's key from Vulcan, as the host body he modified into a cyborg gradually becomes more insect-like. Once preparations for the Cataclysm were completed, Giovanni proceeds to unlock the reactor core with Charon, Ritsu, and Dragon. While Giovanni’s body is destroyed by Vulcan and Lisa, he implanted a parasitic insect holding his consciousness into Yu’s brain to complete his mission. But Giovanni is destroyed for good by Arthur using Excalibur to extract the parasite with Yu unharmed.
Arrow (アロー, Arō)
Voiced by: Yumi Uchiyama (Japanese); Tabitha Ray (seasons 1–2), Jaclyn Thomas (season 3) (English)
A White-Clad member who normally serves as Shō's bodyguard, composed and loyal to the organization's cause. As a Third Generation pyrokinetic, she ignites her left arm to create a bow and arrow of flames which combined with her eyesight makes her ideal as a long-range combatant and sniper. Despite her loyalty to the White Clad, she leaves it to follow Shō and allies with Company 8 on his orders, prioritizing her role as the third pillar's guardian.
Charon (カロン, Karon)
Voiced by: Hiroki Yasumoto (Japanese); Ray Hurd (English)
A White-Clad member who serves as Haumea's bodyguard and guardian; a Second Generation pyrokinetic, who absorbs and convert kinetic energy into thermal energy to unleash explosive attacks. Despite Haumea's abuse, Charon cares for her like a daughter and desires to initiate a second Great Cataclysm to end her suffering. As Haumea proceeds to cause the event, Charon sacrifices himself to buy her time by overloading his body with numerous hits to launch a final devastating attack on Company 8. However, Shinra uses his powers as Shinrabashoman to resurrect Charon so he can help reach Haumea.
Yona (ヨナ)
Voiced by: Yoshitsugu Matsuoka (Japanese); Cory Phillips (English)
A member of the Ashen Flames who is among the White Clad's oldest members despite his youthful appearance. He is later revealed to have originated from the Adolla realm before appearing on Earth in the aftermath of the Great Cataclysm. A self-styled artist whose Third Generation pyrokinesis allows him to rearrange a person's face, Yona used this ability to establish the Holy Sol faith under the guise of Raffles I two centuries before the events of the series while acquiring the First Pillar. Yona's abilities also allow him to create convincing disguises for his subordinates to cause chaos such as during the Asakusa incident. Yona oversees the final phases of Cataclysm as it reaches its zenith, consumed in the flames while believing he can finally return to Adolla.
Inca Kasugatani (因果 春日谷, Inka Kasugatani)
Voiced by: Miyuri Shimabukuro (Japanese); Madeleine Morris (English)
An infamous Fire Thief who saves people from fires in exchange for their valuables, calling herself a fourth generation for being able to smell the likely pathway of any heat source like a fire's pattern of spreading. Inca awakens as the Fifth Pillar (五柱目, Gohashira-me), an embodiment of destruction who can see flame pathways and trigger them to explode, her Adolla Burst allowing her to establish an empathetic link with other Adolla users and predict when one of them is about to awaken. Despite the Fire Force's attempts to recruit her, Inca joins the White Clad for the excitement and willingly allows herself to be sacrificed for their cause. After being revived by Shinra, Inca loses her pyrokinesis and ends up becoming one of the first Witches in the rebooted world that Shinra created.
Sumire (炭隷)
Voiced by: Hitomi Shogawa (Japanese); Jessica Cavanagh (English)
Portrayed by: Sachiyo Motoki (Sugita Sumire)
A member of the Holy Sol Temple, Sumire was originally a normal businesswoman who became disillusioned with humanity, who became a Pillar to cause the Great Cataclysm. As the Seventh Pillar, embodying disgust, Sumire's pyrokinesis allows her to turn the heat produced from the muscle reflex vibrations into kinetic energy potent enough to destroy metal. Having spent years searching for the other Pillars, Sumire was presumed to have died in the burning of St. Raffles Convent where she conducted experiments involving Doppelgänger-type Infernals. She makes her presence known when Company 8 saves Obi and takes her place among the White Clad as preparations for the second Great Cataclysm are complete, offering her life for its fruition and choosing not to return to the living.
Rekka Hoshimiya (烈火 星宮)
Voiced by: Tomokazu Seki (Japanese); Kellen Goff (English)
A White-Clad member who infiltrated Company 1 so he can find people with the Adolla Burst while secretly creating Infernals using Infernal Bugs, hinted of being behind the fire that destroyed Iris and Hibana's orphanage. He was eventually discovered and captured by Karim after being pushed to his limit by Shinra, but quickly silenced by Arrow moments later. As a Third Generation pyrokinetic, he uses his flames to augment his karate fighting style and inflict blows strong as fired rockets.
Haran (ハラン)
Voiced by: Itaru Yamamoto (Japanese); Patrick Seitz (English)
A member of the Ashen Flame who is previously serves as Arrow's partner before eating an Infernal Bug during the Asakusa incident, turning himself into a Demon-type Infernal which Benimaru destroys.
Flail (フレイル, Fureiru)
Voiced by: Kenji Nomura (Japanese); Bryan Massey (English)
A middle-aged member of the Ashen Flame, who has the ability to create a flaming spiked ball at the end of a chain. He infiltrated Company 3 of the Fire Force and was sent by Giovanni with Mirage to kill Vulcan. Flail is later defeated by Maki during Company 8's venture into the Nether.
Iron (アイロン, Airon)
Voiced by: Yasuhiro Mamiya (Japanese); Kenny James (English)
Iron is a towering member of the Ashen Flame, who can create flames that are strong enough to completely incinerate corpses, as well as to increase the endurance of his body. With his body being hardened in conjunction with having a ripped physique, he can destroy cement pillars, and when withstanding being injured by bullets, he compares being shot at to mosquito bites.
Orochi (オロチ)
Voiced by: Shizuka Itō (Japanese); Morgan Garrett (English)
Orochi is a female member of the Ashen Flame, who could manipulate a whip made of fire using a handle and fire off her whip at incredible speed. She was able to turn the whip at will, morphing the wipe's tail into a blunt and rigid state or generating at least eight tails for the whip.
Mirage (ミラージュ, Mirāju)
Voiced by: Susumu Chiba (Japanese); Brad Kurtz (English)
A young member of the Ashen Flame who has the ability to create multiple illusions of people. He infiltrated Company 3 of the Fire Force and was sent by Giovanni with Flail to kill Vulcan. Mirage is later defeated by Arthur during Company 8's venture into the Nether.
Assault (アサルト, Asaruto)
Voiced by: Chikahiro Kobayashi (Japanese); Troy Hughes (English)
A Third Generation pyrokinetic who was previously a member of the White-Clad's assassin branch known as the Butchers (屠リ人, Hofuri Bito), a massacre expert specializing in annihilation and able to use his Crimson Barrett ability to create multiple missiles to attack with. Assault was dispatched to deal with Company 8 when they entered the Nether and attacks Iris and Tamaki Kotatsu in the Netherworld after they got separated from their group. After being defeated by Tamaki in a humiliating fashion, Assault vowed to defeat her while gradually realizing he is developing an attraction to her.
Ritsu (リツ)
Voiced by: Rumi Okubo (Japanese); Brittany Lauda (English)
A White-Clad member who normally serves as Inca's bodyguard and leader of the Knights of the Purple Smoke (紫煙騎士団, Shien Kishidan). She can manipulate dead bodies through her ability Necro Pyro, allowing her to reanimate corpses as her personal army or serve as materials to augment an Infernal. Ritsu aids in the final phases of Cataclysm as it reaches its zenith and is consumed in the resulting flames.
Gold (ゴールド, Gōrudo)
Voiced by: Yoko Hikasa (Japanese); Suzie Yeung (English)
Gold is a member of the Iron Clad's Destroyers, one of its most formidable assassins. She has an apathetic nature and is a Third Generation pyrokenetic with high flame resistance, enough to completely ignore an artificially enhanced blast from Tamaki. Using her Ignition Ability, Gold is able to heat gold and to control the subsequently created magnetic fields. This allows her to levitate objects and control items made of magnetic metals such as iron.
Dragon (ドラゴン, Doragon)
Voiced by: Masaki Aizawa (Japanese); Reagan Murdock (English)
A humanoid Infernal with dragon-like abilities who is the leader of the White-Clad's Butchers, being powerful enough to resist Arthur's sword Excalibur at maximum power and make Benimaru doubtful of being able to defeat him. He is among the White Clad's oldest members, having been recruited by Faerie while wandering the Middle East. Dragon developed an interest in Arthur as the two engage each other in battle while Dragon has archived into a armored form. Following the beginning of the Second Great Cataylsm, he and Arthur engage in a final battle on the moon which results in being disintegrated after being sliced to death by Arthur using Violent Flash: Earth Divider while simultaneously experiencing hope for the first time in his life.
Faerie (フェアリー, Fearī)
Voiced by: Yūko Sanpei
A seemingly composed Third Generation pyrokinetic whose Adolla Burst allows him to manipulate gravity at an atomic level in various ways like flight and countering the Kusakabe brothers' Adolla Bursts. He is among the White-Clad's oldest members as overseer of the Great Cataclysm Execution Specialist Force, having manipulated humanity from the shadows for centuries to ensure the Second Great Cataclysm occurs. When Arthur manages to kill Dragon while disrupting the Great Cataclysm, and after the Kusakabe brothers preventing him from pulling the moon into Earth's orbit, Faerie and his followers commit suicide to summon Doppelgängers of the strongest Fire Force members in a final gambit to ensure the Great Cataclysm resumes.
Fracture (フラクチュ, Furakuchu)
Voiced by: Masaya Matsukaze (Japanese); Brandon Solis (English)
Fracture is a member of the Destroyers and an assassin.
Stream (ストリーム, Sutorīmu)
Voiced by: Shinji Kawada (Japanese); Monty Thompson (English)
Strean is a member of the Destroyers and an assassin. He is a Third Generation pyrokinetic, who can use their Ignition Ability to harness the air currents created by his flames to produce whirlwinds and vacuums and direct them for a variety of effects such as cutting, blasting, and mobility enhancement.
First Pillar (一柱目, Hitohashira-Me)
Voiced by: M.A.O (Japanese); Cherami Leigh (English)
Her real name Amaterasu, she is a survivor of the first Great Catalysm. Found by Yona after she awakened as the First Pillar, he sealed her inside the Amaterasu reactor to serve as the means to restart civilization in order to initiate a second Great Catalysm. The centuries-long isolation made Amaterasu resentful towards mankind as their collective subconscious eventually created her Doppelgänger Iris, influencing Shinra at times to give into his own resentment. After the second Great Catalysm is prevented after being sacrificed for it, Amaterasu decided to remain dead so Iris can live a full life in her stead.

== Chinese Peninsula ==
The Chinese Peninsula is on the continent west of Tokyo and contains fragile dry land. For two hundred and fifty years after the Great Disaster, Infernals have wandered areas of the peninsula.

Black Lady (黒の女, Kuro no Onna)
Voiced by: Atsumi Tanezaki (Japanese); Mallorie Rodak (English)
The mysterious girl is a third generation pyrokinetic who acquired an Adolla Burst during the Great Cataclysm after being bitten by Evangelist's Infernal Bug. She arrived at the peninsula from the Tear in Space after the Great Disaster and granted the surrounding animals both sapience and immortality. She repaired the Tabernacle (御神体, Goshintai) reactor to serve as power source which created the Oasis and made it habitable. Two centuries after entering the Tabernacle, the severity of her burns from being inside increased her Adolla presence. She communicated with Shinra via the Adolla Link to protect the Oasis from Tempeh and gave Shinra a one-second use of Divine Protection. Later she revealed her history and relationship with the Evangelist.
Scop (スコップ, Skoppu)
Voiced by: Kentarō Itō (Japanese); Tyler Walker (English)
A talking mole who was among the animals granted sapience and immortality by the Black Lady.
Tempeh (テンペ, Tenpe)
Voiced by: Hideyuki Hori (Japanese); R. Bruce Elliott (English)
A survivor of the Great Cataclysm, Tempeh ventured to the Tear in Space where he encountered the Evangelist. He became an Infernal while retaining his consciousness, but centuries of unending pain drove Tempe insane as he became consumed by a desire to die at any cost. He gained a following of other sentient Infernals whom he ordered to collect stone tablets to destroy the Tabernacle. The resulting explosion set their souls free, but the appearance of the Fire Force resulted in his death while fighting Shinra.

== Other characters ==
Joker (ジョーカー, Jōkā)
Voiced by: Kenjiro Tsuda, Tasuku Hatanaka (young), Natsumi Fujiwara (child)^{Ep. 36 credits} (Japanese); Sonny Strait, Ashe Thurman (young) (English)
A wanted criminal and Third-Generation pyrokinetic, he was inducted as a member of the Shadow of the Holy Sun assassins at a young age and designated as "52". He was placed under Leonard Burns as encounter with an Infernal caused them to experience an Adolla Link, losing his left eye while gaining an interest to uncover the truth of the world concealed by the Tokyo Empire. As he escaped the organization and formed an alliance with Viktor Licht, Joker expressed an interest in Shinra since their first meeting, providing him with information regarding his family's tragedy and assisting Company 8 at times. He later offers his help to Company 8 after they are labeled outlaws of the Tokyo Empire, assisting Shinra in saving Obi and facing Burns.
Madoka Oze (まどか 尾瀬)
Voiced by: Aya Hisakawa (Japanese); Stephanie Young (English)
Madoka is Maki and Takigi's kind mother and also a Second-Generation pyrokinetic.
Shinmon Hibachi (新門 火鉢)
Voiced by: Hōchū Ōtsuka (Japanese); Larry Brantley (English)
Hibachi is the former Fire Chief of the Asakusa firefighters and Benimaru's father, who died, but is resurrected as an infernal during the Great Cataclysm. Being a Third Generation pyrokinetic, he used his ignited flames in conjunction with his unique fighting style, which he created, mastered and then passed down to Benimaru.
Mari Kusakabe (マリ 日下部)
Voiced by: Ayako Kawasumi (Japanese); Kimmie Britt (English)
Mari is the mother of Shinra and Sho, both revealed to be parthenogenetic births that the Holy Sol covered up. Mari ends up being turned into a Demon Infernal when Sho awakens his Adolla Burst, blinding herself upon gazing at the Evangelist before spiriting Sho to the White Clad. She was declared dead in the aftermath. Mari later appears to aid Shinra against the Evangelist and Haumea, revealed to be the Evangelist’s doppelgänger as an embodiment of hope in physical form.
