= Jukki Hanada =

Japanese screenwriter and author (born 1969)

Jukki Hanada (花田 十輝, Hanada Jukki; born 1969) is a Japanese anime screenwriter and light novelist. His grandfather was essayist and literary critic Kiyoteru Hanada, who also gave him his first name.

== Screenwriting ==
=== Television series ===
- Jankenman (1992)
- Yoyo no Neko Tsumami (1992)
- Tanoshii Willow Town (1994)
- Slayers (1995)
- Slayers Next (1996)
- Chobits (2002)
- Magical Shopping Arcade Abenobashi (2002)
- Mahoromatic: Something More Beautiful (2002)
- Petite Princess Yucie (2002–2003)
- The Mythical Detective Loki Ragnarok (2003)
- Popotan (2003)
- Hanaukyo Maid Team: La Verite (2004)
- Rozen Maiden (2004)
- Burn-Up Scramble (2004)
- Diamond Daydreams (2004)
- Kannazuki no Miko (2004)
- Gakuen Alice (2004–2005)
- Ah! My Goddess (2005)
- He Is My Master (2005)
- Da Capo: Second Season (2005)
- Elemental Gelade (2005)
- Strawberry Marshmallow (2005)
- Happy Seven (2005)
- Rozen Maiden Träumend (2005–2006)
- Fate/stay night (2006)
- Sasami: Magical Girls Club (2006)
- Ah! My Goddess: Flights of Fancy (2006)
- Kashimashi: Girl Meets Girl (2006)
- Rozen Maiden Ouvertüre (2006)
- Code-E (2007)
- Idolmaster: Xenoglossia (2007)
- Sola (2007)
- Mission-E (2008)
- Kyōran Kazoku Nikki (2008)
- H2O: Footprints in the Sand (2008)
- S.A (2008)
- Yozakura Quartet (2008)
- Chrome Shelled Regios (2009)
- K-On! (2009)
- Beyblade: Metal Fusion (2009)
- The Girl Who Leapt Through Space (2009)
- Student Council's Discretion (2009)
- Shugo Chara!! Doki (2009)
- Tatakau Shisho: The Book of Bantorra (2009)
- Hanasakeru Seishōnen (2009–2010)
- K-On!! (2010)
- Princess Jellyfish (2010)
- Level E (2010)
- Nichijou (2011)
- Kimi to Boku (2011)
- Steins;Gate (2011)
- Natsume's Book of Friends (2011–2012)
- Kimi to Boku 2 (2012)
- Accel World (2012)
- Campione! (2012)
- Love, Chunibyo & Other Delusions Lite (2012)
- Love, Chunibyo & Other Delusions (2012)
- The Pet Girl of Sakurasou (2012–2013)
- Robotics;Notes (2012–2013)
- Tamako Market (2013)
- A Certain Scientific Railgun S (2013)
- Strike the Blood (2013)
- Magi: The Kingdom of Magic (2013)
- Beyond the Boundary (2013)
- Love Live! School Idol Project (2013–2014)
- Beyond the Boundary: Idol Trial! (2013–2014)
- Love, Chunibyo & Other Delusions: -Heart Throb- Lite (2013–2014)
- Love, Chunibyo & Other Delusions -Heart Throb- (2014)
- No Game No Life (2014)
- The Seven Deadly Sins (2014–2015)
- Kantai Collection (2015)
- Sound! Euphonium (2015)
- Wakaba Girl (2015)
- Sound! Euphonium 2 (2016)
- Love Live! Sunshine!! (2016–2017)
- Comic Girls (2018)
- A Place Further than the Universe (2018)
- Bloom Into You (2018)
- Steins;Gate 0 (2018)
- Hitori Bocchi no Marumaru Seikatsu (2019)
- Granbelm (2019)
- Love Live! Superstar!! (2021–2022)
- The Dangers in My Heart (2023–2024)
- Sengoku Youko (2024)
- Girls Band Cry (2024)
- Sakuna: Of Rice and Ruin (2024)
- Atri: My Dear Moments (2024)
- Medalist (2025–present)
- See You Tomorrow at the Food Court (2025)
- Gnosia (2025–2026)
- I Want to Love You Till Your Dying Day (2026)

=== OVAs ===
- Sola: A Different Route (2007)
- Sola: Towards the Dawning Sky (2007)
- Aki Sora (2009)
- Aki Sora: Yume no Naka (2010)
- Nichijou Episode 0 (2011)
- Steins;Gate: Egoistic Poriomania (2012)
- Love, Chunibyo & Other Delusions: Glimmering...Explosive Festival (Slapstick Noel) (2013)
- Love, Chunibyo & Other Delusions -Heart Throb-: Playback of...the Wicked Eye's Apocalypse (The Rikka Wars) (2014)
- Beyond the Boundary: Daybreak (2014)
- Sound! Euphonium: Dash, Monaka (2015)
- Steins;Gate 0 – Valentine's of Crystal Polymorphism: Bittersweet Intermedio (2018)
- Sound! Euphonium: Ensemble Contest (2023)

=== Anime films ===
- Steins;Gate: The Movie − Load Region of Déjà Vu (2013)
- Love, Chunibyo & Other Delusions: Rikka Version (2013)
- Love Live! The School Idol Movie (2015)
- Beyond the Boundary: I'll Be Here – Past (2015)
- Beyond the Boundary: I'll Be Here – Future (2015)
- KanColle: The Movie (2016)
- Sound! Euphonium: The Movie – Welcome to the Kitauji High School Concert Band (2016)
- No Game No Life: Zero (2017)
- Sound! Euphonium: The Movie – May the Melody Reach You! (2017)
- Love, Chunibyo & Other Delusions! Take on Me (2018)
- Love Live! Sunshine!! The School Idol Movie: Over The Rainbow (2019)
- Sound! Euphonium: The Movie – Our Promise: A Brand New Day (2019)
- A Few Moments of Cheers (2024)
- Gekijōban Medalist (2027)
- Girls Band Cry: The Movie (2027)

== Books ==
=== Light novels ===
- Ojōsama Express (1996–97)
- Kururi kuru!: De suru Raishū (2001)
- Dai Kiraina, ano Sora ni (2001)
- Second Stage (2001)
- Twice X'mas (2001)

=== Manga ===
- Kururi kuru! (2001, Comic Gum) – Story
- Hōrorogion (2009, Dengeki Daioh) – Story

== Awards and nominations ==
Year	Award	Category	Result	Ref.
2015	Tokyo Anime Award	Best Screenplay / Original Story	Won	
2019	Tokyo Anime Award	Best Screenplay / Original Story	Won	
