= Monthly Comic Ryū =

Japanese manga magazine

- September 2008 issue (volume 23, issue 9)
- Categories: Seinen manga
- Frequency: Monthly
- Publisher: Tokuma Shoten
- First issue: May 1979
- Country: Japan
- Website: www.comic-ryu.jp

Monthly Comic Ryū (月刊 Comic リュウ, Gekkan Komikku Ryū) is a Japanese monthly seinen manga and anime magazine published by Tokuma Shoten. The magazine was originally a quarterly special issue of Animage, beginning in 1979 before switching to a monthly schedule and finally suspending publication. On November 19, 2006, the magazine began to be published again, with the first new issue coming with a DVD of the exclusive OVA Onna Tachiguishi-Retsuden directed by world famous director Mamoru Oshii. On June 19, 2018, the magazine ceased printing and became an online magazine.

Oshii's manga Kerberos & Tachiguishi was serialized in Monthly Comic Ryū in 2006 and 2007. The follow-up of 1990s famous Heavy Metal Warrior Xenon by Masaomi Kanzaki, Xenon 199X R, was also serialized in the magazine. Most famous published series was probably Legend of the Galactic Heroes by Yoshiki Tanaka and Katsumi Michihara though. Monthly Comic Ryū was launched as an "over 30-years-old readers recommended" magazine.

== Serializations ==
=== Current ===
- A Centaur's Life by Kei Murayama
- Alice & Zoroku by Tetsuya Imai
- Hitsuji Ryu-kai no Kemono Jijō (羊竜飼いのケモノ事情) by Ukanmuri
- If My Favorite Pop Idol Made It to the Budokan, I Would Die by Auri Hirao
- All Eyes on Nekoyashiki-kun! Notice Me, Not My Characters by Kazuki Minamoto
- Monster Musume by Okayado
- Nurse Hitomi's Monster Infirmary by Shake-O
- Princess Principal by Ryou Akizuki
- Shadow Skill Dawn by Megumu Okada
- ZINGNIZE by Warainaku

=== Former ===
- Arion by Yoshikazu Yasuhiko
- Bokura no Hentai (ぼくらのへんたい) by Fumi Fumiko
- Butterfly Storage by Icori Ando
- Cagaster of an Insect Cage by Kachō Hashimoto
- Choir! by Tenpō Gensui
- Dreambuster (ドリームバスター) by Masahiko Nakahira and Miyuki Miyabe
- Genma Wars: Rebirth by Kazumasa Hirai and Shotaro Ishinomori
- The Great Adventures of the Dirty Pair by Haruka Takachiho and Hisao Tamaki
- Emanon (エマノン) by Shinji Kajio and Kenji Tsuruta
- Hades Project Zeorymer by Chimi Moriwo
- Hinagiku Jyunshin Onna Gakuen (ひなぎく純真女学園) by Keiko Fukuyama
- Hour of the Zombie by Tsukasa Saimura
- Kerberos and Tachiguishi by Mamoru Sugiura and Mamoru Oshii
- Koha Kasugai no Amanattou (子はカスガイの甘納豆) by Shimpei Itoh
- KEYMAN -THE HAND OF JUDGMENT- by Warainaku
- Legend of the Galactic Heroes: Portrait of Heroes by Yoshiki Tanaka and Katsumi Michihara
- Loup-garou (ルー＝ガルー) by Higuchi Akihiko and Natsuhiko Kyogoku
- Mitsume no Yumeji (三つ目の夢二) by Eiji Ootsuka and Subzero Kizaki
- MM Little Morning (MMリトルモーニング/青空にとおく酒浸り) by Kōichirō Yasunaga
- Norui Oku Shimai (のろい屋しまい) by Hirarin
- Onmyōji: Taki Yasha Hime by Munku Mitsuki
- Regina (レジーナ) by Shoko Yoshinaka
- Revive! by Koichi Igarashi
- Taishō Baseball Girls by Shimpei Itoh
- Tsubame: You Bamari Shōjo Kikou (つばめ〜陽だまり少女紀行) by Noriyuki Matsumoto
- Uruwashijima Yume Monogatari (麗島夢譚) by Yoshikazu Yasuhiko
- Xenon: 199X R by Masaomi Kanzaki
- Yanagihana: Yupha no Daichi (柳花 ~ユファの大地~) by Harutoshi Fukui and Wosamu Kine
- Yuru Yul Nya!! (ゆるユルにゃー!!) by Funi Koishikawa
