= Butterfly Storage =

Japanese manga series

- Cover of Butterfly Storage volume 1 published by Tokuma Shoten featuring Hyakushi Ono

バタフライ・ストレージ (Batafurai Sutorēji)
- Manga
- Written by: Icori Ando
- Published by: Tokuma Shoten
- Magazine: Monthly Comic Ryū
- Original run: May 19, 2016 – August 9, 2018
- Volumes: 4

Butterfly Storage (Japanese: バタフライ・ストレージ, Hepburn: Batafurai Sutorēji) is a Japanese manga series by Icori Ando. It was serialized in Tokuma Shoten's seinen manga magazine Monthly Comic Ryū from May 2016 to August 2018 and has been collected in 4tankōbon volumes.

== Overview ==
=== Setting ===
Butterfly Storage is set in a futuristic reality in which the government's Death Bureau agency job is to collect, freeze and manage the souls of the deceased (which leave the human body in the form of a butterfly) before they disappear for good, 49 days after their host death. Using the butterflies, the family of the deceased can come in contact with their loved ones in the form of a 3D hologram.

=== Plot ===
Hyakushi Ono lost his entire family in a plane crash fourteen years ago. But since this tragedy, the body of Senri, his twin sister, is still intact while the butterfly that contains her soul was stolen by a mysterious individual during the accident, leaving her unconscious and in a vegetative state.

In order to get back his sister's butterfly, Ono joins the famous "Death Bureau", a state agency specialized in the capture, conservation and management of the butterflies.
