= Girls Band Cry =

Japanese anime television series

- Key visual featuring Togenashi Togeari. Clockwise from left: Subaru Awa, Momoka Kawaragi, Nina Iseri (center), Tomo Ebizuka, and Rupa

ガールズバンドクライ (Gāruzu Bando Kurai)
- Genre: Drama; Music
- Created by: Toei Animation
- Anime television series
- Directed by: Kazuo Sakai
- Produced by: Tadashi Hirayama
- Written by: Jukki Hanada
- Music by: Kenji Tamai
- Studio: Toei Animation
- Licensed by: Crunchyroll
- Original network: Tokyo MX, Sun TV, KBS Kyoto, BS11
- Original run: April 6, 2024 – June 29, 2024
- Episodes: 13
- Video game

Momoka (wo) Wasshoi (桃香（を）ワッショイ)
- Developer: Toei Animation
- Publisher: Toei Animation
- Genre: Action, Platform
- Platform: Windows
- Released: September 29, 2025
- Manga
- Written by: Boiru Iseebi
- Published by: Micro Magazine
- Magazine: Comic Ride; RaiComi
- Original run: January 30, 2026 – present
- Volumes: 1
- Video game

Girls Band Cry First Riff (ガールズバンドクライ First Riff)
- Developer: Donuts Games
- Publisher: Donuts Games
- Platform: iOS, Android
- Released: TBA
- Anime film

Girls Band Cry: The Movie
- Directed by: Kazuo Sakai
- Written by: Jukki Hanada
- Music by: Kenji Tamai
- Studio: Toei Animation
- Released: May 21, 2027
- icon

Girls Band Cry (Japanese: ガールズバンドクライ, Hepburn: Gāruzu Bando Kurai), abbreviated as GaruKura (ガルクラ), is an original Japanese anime television series created and produced by Toei Animation. The series is part of a multimedia project that began in 2023 in collaboration with Agehasprings and Universal Music Japan, with music being the focus. It aired from April to June 2024.

A film titled Girls Band Cry: The Movie, is set to release in May 2027. A mobile game developed by Donuts titled Girls Band Cry First Riff (ガールズバンドクライ First Riff) is in development, and an action-platformer Windows game titled Momoka (wo) Wasshoi (桃香（を）ワッショイ), inspired by the anime series, was announced in September 2025.

== Plot ==
Set in Kawasaki, Kanagawa Prefecture, the series follows Nina Iseri, a high school dropout who moves to the city to prove she can live by herself and be successful. She then meets Momoka Kawaragi by chance, and the two realize their commonalities, including a shared love of music. Together with other girls from different walks of life, the girls form a band as an avenue to let their raw emotions out, while facing hardships with their internal struggles and being new to the music scene.

== Characters ==
=== Togenashi Togeari ===
Togenashi Togeari (トゲナシトゲアリ; lit. "thornless thorn") is the central rock band of the series, consisting primarily of high school dropouts. Before the band's formation, each member was part of two bands, with Nina, Momoka, and Subaru performing under the name Shin-Kawasaki (Temporary) (新川崎（仮）, Shin-Kawasaki (Kari)), and Tomo and Rupa performing as Vocaloid duo Beni-Shouga (derived from the condiment of the same name, stylized in lowercase). After merging, their new name originates from Nina reading an audience member's shirt saying "Togenashi Togeari" during their Suwa live house gig.

Nina Iseri (井芹 仁菜, Iseri Nina)
Voiced by: Rina (理名)
The main protagonist of the series and the lead vocalist of Togenashi Togeari hailing from Kumamoto who left her hometown and her strained past life to start anew. She is not on good terms with her father and dropped out of high school due to being the subject of bullying. She initially moved to Tokyo with the aim of studying at a cram school and entering university, only to focus on Togenashi Togeari instead. She is a major fan of the band Diamond Dust and felt that their songs helped her during the difficult times in her life. In promotional material, she is seen with a Butterscotch Blonde G&L Asat Classic electric guitar, a guitar based on the design of the Fender Telecaster, which she plays as the band's rhythm guitarist in the finale.
Momoka Kawaragi (河原木 桃香, Kawaragi Momoka)
Voiced by: Yuri (夕莉)
The lead guitarist and leader of Togenashi Togeari hailing from Asahikawa who was a former member of Diamond Dust before leaving due to creative differences, a decision she holds regret despite holding no ill will towards her former bandmates. She then performed as a solo artist and planned to quit before meeting Nina and being reinvigorated by her determination. She plays a Costa Azul Metallic Psychederhythm Psychomaster electric guitar, a Japanese-made Fender Jazzmaster clone.
Subaru Awa (安和 すばる, Awa Subaru)
Voiced by: Mirei (美怜)
The drummer of Togenashi Togeari hailing from Kobe who attends acting school to follow in her grandmother's footsteps despite showing no interest for acting and desires to follow her own path through pursuing music. She plays a Charcoal Metallic Pearl Roadshow drum kit.
Tomo Ebizuka (海老塚 智, Ebizuka Tomo)
Voiced by: Natsu (凪都)
The keyboardist of Togenashi Togeari hailing from Sendai who ran away from home after experiencing parental neglect and has dreams of performing at the Budokan. Her tendency to give blunt feedback due to being gifted at playing the keyboard and expecting the same level of skill towards her bandmates also resulted in her and Rupa's former band breaking up prior to the anime. She plays a Nord Electro 6HP 73-key digital piano.
Rupa (ルパ)
Voiced by: Shuri (朱李)
The bassist of Togenashi Togeari who lost her parents and experiences discrimination due to her half-South Asian heritage. Like Tomo, she has dreams of performing at the Budokan. She plays an Ebony Gibson SG Standard bass.

=== Diamond Dust ===
Diamond Dust (ダイヤモンドダスト) is an idol rock band Nina idolizes and which Momoka was a member of, starting as a group of friends forming a school band before dropping out and being signed to a major label by the time Momoka left the band.

Hina (ヒナ)
Voiced by: Reina Kondō
The lead vocalist and rhythm guitarist of Diamond Dust after Momoka's departure, and a former friend of Nina. She plays a See-Through Purple Fernandes NTG-LTD electric guitar.
Nana (ナナ)
Voiced by: Misato Matsuoka
The bassist of Diamond Dust who plays a Caribbean Shoreline Flat Ibanez Premium SR1605B bass.
Rin (リン)
Voiced by: Yuki Urushiyama
The lead guitarist of Diamond Dust who plays a Deep Candy Apple Red ESP Horizon-I electric guitar.
Ai (アイ)
Voiced by: Momoko Miyashiro
The drummer of Diamond Dust who plays a Natural Cherry Pearl Masters Maple drum kit.

=== Iseri family ===
Muneo Iseri (井芹 宗男, Iseri Muneo)
Voiced by: Haruo Yamagishi
Nina's father who works as an advisor to Kumamoto's board of education. Before the events of the anime, Muneo and Nina had an estranged relationship with Muneo having difficulty in understanding his daughter, despite having published a book on parenting.
Yasue Iseri (井芹 靖恵, Iseri Yasue)
Voiced by: Sachiko Kojima
Nina's mother.
Suzune Iseri (井芹 涼音, Iseri Suzune)
Voiced by: Sakura Ando
Nina's older sister.

=== Other characters ===
Tendou Awa (安和 天童, Awa Tendō)
Voiced by: Naoko Kouda
Subaru's grandmother who is a prolific actress.
Hayashi (林)
Voiced by: Hiroaki Hirata
The manager of the Tokyo live house Shin-Kawasaki performed in.
Mine (ミネ)
Voiced by: Miyuki Sawashiro
An indie musician who Momoka idolizes and is friends with.
Shiomi Miura (三浦 潮海, Miura Shiomi)
Voiced by: Ai Furihata
A talent scout affiliated with Golden Archer who is a fan of the original Diamond Dust and offers her connections to Togenashi Togeari on linking with a label for further popularity.

== Production ==
=== Background ===
In August 2019, upon joining Toei Animation, series producer Tadashi Hirayama was approached to produce a new original work focused on music. Hirayama enlisted Kazuo Sakai and Jukki Hanada, whom he had worked with on Love Live! Sunshine!!, to brainstorm the initial ideas of the story. Hirayama then approached Kenji Tamai of Agehasprings around the end of 2019 to compose the music for the project and scout and manage the talents to form the band.

Hanada focused on writing an all-female band story for the project based on his love for Japanese rock music, having already written stories about idols. Hirayama cited the projected economic loss from the 2020 Tokyo Olympics and the COVID-19 pandemic as inspirations to make the story grounded in reality, basing it around the hardships of being a musician. The decision to set the story in Kawasaki was based on Hirayama and Hanada's observations of the city being overlooked compared to the neighboring cities of Tokyo and Yokohama, rent being cheaper, and its music scene, further grounding the story.

=== Development and casting ===
In June 2021, Toei Animation, Agehasprings, and Universal Music Japan announced they would initiate a new project which would combine animation with real band activity. In the same year, Agehasprings, with the assistance from Toei Animation and Universal Music Japan, held an audition called "Girl's Rock Audition" for the vocalist, guitarist, bassist, drummer, and keyboardist of the all-female band which would be the core of the project. Tamai recounted how he aimed the band to debut first to foster their popularity before the anime began its airing. He also shared that although the auditions received several applications, there was difficulty in choosing candidates who had proficient skills in both music and voice acting, leading the process to take more than a year and half to find the necessary talent.

An original anime television series produced by Toei Animation titled Girls Band Cry was announced on April 24, 2023, with a teaser visual revealed. The visual features a girl with a guitar, with a slogan "Throw in All the Anger, Joy, and Sadness." (怒りも喜びも哀しさも全部ぶちこめ。) On May 29 of the same year, a key visual of the anime was revealed alongside the main cast and staff. The five members of Togenashi Togeari were also revealed with the music videos of their two songs, "Na mo Naki Nani mo Kamo" (名もなき何もかも; "Nameless Name") and "Itsuwari no Kotowari" (偽りの理; "No Rhyme nor Reason"), released on the project's YouTube channel. In the following months, more music videos that accompany their recently released songs would be released to their channel alongside introductory videos of each member of Togenashi Togeari; these songs would later be compiled into physical singles.

== Media ==
=== Music ===
The discography of Girls Band Cry includes two studio albums, one soundtrack album, two extended plays, and eleven singles performed by Togenashi Togeari. Additionally, two digital singles were released by Diamond Dust, later compiled as an extended play. All music is released under the Universal Music Japan label.

==== Singles ====
Title	Release date	Peak chart positions	
Title	Release date	Oricon	JPN
Na mo Naki Nani mo Kamo (名もなき何もかも; Nameless Name)	July 26, 2023	—	82
Kiutsu, Hakudaku-su (気鬱、白濁す; White Drizzle in Gloom)	August 30, 2023	—	96
Hazete Saku (爆ぜて咲く; Bleeding Hearts)	October 25, 2023	—	70
Gokushiteki Gokusaishoku Answer (極私的極彩色アンサー; Answer to Extreme)	December 20, 2023	—	58
Unmei ni Kaketai Ronri (運命に賭けたい論理; Lonely Fate to Be Destined)	February 29, 2024	—	69
Zattō, Bokura no Machi (雑踏、僕らの街; Wrong World)	May 22, 2024	16	18
Darenimo Narenai Watashi Dakara (誰にもなれない私だから; I'm Nobody)	May 22, 2024	22	23
Shikai no Sumi Kuchiru Oto (視界の隅朽ちる音; What to Raise)	June 19, 2024	9	11
Kuuhaku to Catharsis (空白とカタルシス; Emptiness and Catharsis)	July 10, 2024	6	5
Daremo (ダレモ; No One)	May 28, 2025	13	15
Usu Sai Display (薄采ディスプレイ; Fragile Violet)	September 24, 2025	16	16
"—" denotes releases that did not chart.

==== Extended plays ====
Title	Release date	Peak chart positions	
Title	Release date	Oricon	JPN
Koyubi Tatemasen ka (小指立てませんか; Let's give them the pinky finger)	November 19, 2025	19	20
Zenbu o Sarashite Ikiteyaru (全部をさらして生きてやる; I'll live with my heart on my sleeve!)	December 17, 2025	12	11

==== Albums ====
===== Studio albums =====
Title	Release date	Peak chart positions	
Title	Release date	Oricon	JPN
Togeari (棘アリ)	April 24, 2024	10	8
Togenashi (棘ナシ)	August 28, 2024	6	5

===== Soundtrack albums =====
Title	Release date	Peak chart positions		Ref.
Title	Release date	Oricon	JPN	Ref.
TV Anime "Girls Band Cry" Original Soundtrack (TVアニメ『ガールズバンドクライ』オリジナルサウンドトラック)	September 11, 2024	13	11	

==== Other ====
Title	Release date	Peak chart positions		Ref.
Title	Release date	Oricon	JPN	Ref.
Cycle of Sorrow	July 10, 2024	10	83	

=== Anime ===
On December 20, 2023, the first PV for the anime was released with its premiere set for April 2024. A second PV was later released on February 9, 2024, confirming its premiere date of April 6 of the same year. It is directed by Kazuo Sakai, with Jukki Hanada handling the series composition alongside writing the screenplays, Tadashi Hirayama as series producer, Nari Teshima designing the characters, Mari Kondō and Jae Hoon Jung as CGI directors, and Kenji Tamai as music composer. The series aired from April 6 to June 29, 2024, on Tokyo MX and other networks. (Note: Tokyo MX lists the series premiere on April 5, 2024, at 24:30, which is effectively April 6 at 12:30 a.m. JST) The opening theme is "Zattō, Bokura no Machi" (雑踏、僕らの街; "Wrong World"), while the ending theme is "Darenimo Narenai Watashi Dakara" (誰にもなれない私だから; "I'm Nobody"), both performed by Togenashi Togeari.

Toei Animation Inc. digitally released the series in North America on Microsoft Movies & TV, Fandango at Home, Hoopla, and Prime Video on August 13. The decision was met with confusion and criticism by some fans as it was seen as embarrassing and "out of touch" with the show's overseas audience. Crunchyroll streamed the series worldwide outside of East Asia on November 6.

On September 13, at the end of Togenashi Togeari's second live concert, it was announced that a two-part compilation film is in production. The two parts of the compilation film, titled "Seishun Kyōsōkyoku" (青春狂走曲) and "Nā, Mirai." (なぁ、未来。), opened in Japanese theaters on October 3 and November 14, 2025, respectively via Toei Company, Ltd.

During a panel at AnimagiC on August 2, 2025, anime publisher Peppermint announced to release the anime series on Blu-ray in German-speaking regions beginning in 2026.

==== Episodes ====
No.	Title	Directed by (Note: Production staff information is taken from the ending credits of each episode)	Storyboarded by	Original release date
1	"Tokyo Heave-Ho"; Transliteration: "Tōkyō Wasshoi" (Japanese: 東京ワッショイ)	Kazuo Sakai	Kazuo Sakai	April 6, 2024
Nina Iseri, a high school dropout who left Kumamoto, arrives in Kawasaki to prove to her estranged family that she can live by herself. While waiting at the station and browsing social media, she sees a post of a street performance taking place within the area. Nina visits it and encounters Momoka Kawaragi, a former member of a group Nina idolizes named Diamond Dust. Heading to Momoka's house for Nina to stay, Momoka discloses she would be leaving Kawasaki the following morning to quit music, much to Nina's confusion. Momoka asks Nina her reason for moving to Kawasaki, and Nina replies that she has no place for her back home after being blamed for an action she did not commit in her past. Nina then asks why Momoka left Diamond Dust, with Momoka citing creative differences as the driving factor. The following morning, Nina wakes up to see Momoka gone; not wanting her to leave, Nina runs to where Momoka held her last street performance and expresses her desire to not see her give up. Momoka appears and both perform a song Momoka composed in her time with Diamond Dust.
2	"Three Nocturnal Creatures"; Transliteration: "Yakō-sei no Ikimono San-biki" (Japanese: 夜行性の生き物3匹)	Maya Asakura	Kazuo Sakai	April 13, 2024
As Nina enrolls at a cram school, Momoka proposes on forming a band upon seeing her skills as a vocalist, which Nina declines. Nina also opens up on her strained past life, and she and Momoka promise to do well in their endeavors. Momoka later introduces Nina to her friend Subaru Awa, who is enlisted as the band's drummer. The three girls head out for dinner, with Nina becoming isolated from Momoka and Subaru's banter. Subaru attempts to engage in a conversation with Nina, making her uncomfortable enough to leave. Momoka confronts Nina on her behavior, and Nina voices her assumption that Subaru seems to be looking down on her like her bullies did. Refusing to be convinced otherwise, Nina angrily leaves, declaring she will close herself off from anybody; she begins to mope on her cynical outlook and lashes out. As she realizes she will be left alone in darkness, Momoka and Subaru arrive to comfort her. Momoka states her admiration of Nina sticking true to herself before enlisting her to the band.
3	"Misaligned Questions and Answers"; Transliteration: "Zukkoke Mondō" (Japanese: ズッコケ問答)	Miho Hirayama	Kazuo Sakai	April 20, 2024
The girls discuss on what type of song they should compose as a band. After the meeting Subaru offers to walk Nina home. Nina, still nervous around Subaru, goes home ahead of her. Momoka discovers that Subaru left her phone, and the next day, she requests that Nina return it to Subaru. Reluctantly complying, Nina arrives at Subaru's acting school in Tokyo, hands the phone back, and prepares to head home despite Subaru's polite requests for dinner. Subaru explains she has no intention to cause problems and is open to any comments Nina has of her, adding she took up acting to follow her grandmother's footsteps even if she has no interest in it and prefers music; after a few conversations, Nina and Subaru begin to speak on equal footing. Momoka has also reserved a public concert for them to perform in, but Nina has doubts on performing to a big audience. On the day of the public concert, the girls, debuting under the temporary name Shin-Kawasaki, wait for Nina to come onstage. Momoka calls out to her and motivates her to let her emotions all out, giving Nina the confidence to perform with her bandmates.
4	"Appreciation (Surprise)"; Transliteration: "Kansha (Odoroki)" (Japanese: 感謝（驚）)	Kazue Otsuki	Kazuo Sakai	April 27, 2024
While taking a break from rehearsing, Subaru receives a message and leaves ahead of Nina and Momoka. Subaru messages the following morning she would be leaving the band. Nina and Momoka head to the acting school to try and convince her not to follow through, where they see Subaru accompanying her grandmother, actress Tendou Awa. Subaru explains to them she cannot directly express to her grandmother on not wanting to be an actress. She reiterates on having no intention to quit and states she would only be seen as an actress following Tendou's footsteps, further proven as she receives an email on being cast to a drama per Tendou's recommendation. Nina visits Subaru's apartment and she suggests on coming clean with her intentions, which Subaru agrees. During a shoot for the drama days later, however, as Tendou conveys her gratefulness for Subaru coming to appreciate her profession after experiencing resentment for it within the family, Nina prevents Subaru from confessing, much to her annoyance. Despite this, Subaru figures she would have to deal with the issue soon and decides to help out the band at present.
5	"Rising Vocals"; Transliteration: "Utagoe Yō Kore" (Japanese: 歌声よおこれ)	Maya Asakura	Kazuo Sakai	May 4, 2024
Momoka reserves Shin-Kawasaki to a live house gig and tasks each member to sell tickets. In the process of doing so, the live house manager requests Nina and Subaru to give a Diamond Dust concert ticket gifted to him by one of its members to Momoka, but the girls decide to watch the concert themselves knowing Momoka would not accept the ticket. Nina recognizes the band's new vocalist, Hina, as a former friend who abandoned her during Nina's bullying, causing her to leave in anger. Nina and Momoka later come to a head with how they view Diamond Dust, with Momoka defending her former band. Subaru interrupts by taking their quarrel to an izakaya to settle it. Nina questions Momoka's indifference to the direction of the current Diamond Dust and calls her out on quitting due to the changes not favoring her vision, remarking the Diamond Dust Momoka formed was what helped Nina at her lowest point. Momoka opens up about quitting Diamond Dust amid its commercialization despite her bandmates' pleas to stay. They then make amends as the girls later perform their gig.
6	"Hymn of the Stray"; Transliteration: "Haguremono Sanka" (Japanese: はぐれ者賛歌)	Yasuhiro Tanabe	Kazuo Sakai	May 11, 2024
Two girls are shown rewatching Shin-Kawasaki's gig before recording a song. Meanwhile, Momoka asserts the band should continue practicing. Nina and Subaru ask her if she has any goal for the band and Momoka replies that she has none, leading Subaru to also ask Nina what her own goal is. Nina infers that a large following can be a way to be noticed and proposes ways to gain followers to Momoka and Subaru. When they question her sudden drive, Nina proclaims to become professional and not lose to Diamond Dust. As Nina expresses her plans to Subaru, they are approached by the two girls. Introducing themselves as Rupa and Tomo Ebizuka of Beni-Shouga, they scout Shin-Kawasaki for a collaboration after watching them perform. Nina and Subaru approach Momoka on evaluating Rupa and Tomo's skills and offer to collaborate; they then discuss Momoka's reluctance to go professional despite being still passionate for music. Shin-Kawasaki and Beni-Shouga later jointly rehearse and see their synergy. Nina convinces Momoka on letting Rupa and Tomo join the band and they apply for a music festival, noticing Diamond Dust is a headliner.
7	"I'll Give It a Name"; Transliteration: "Namae wo Tsukete Yaru" (Japanese: 名前をつけてやる)	Kazue Otsuki & Kenji Imura	Kazuo Sakai	May 18, 2024
The girls discuss on renaming the band from Shin-Kawasaki after Rupa and Tomo join as Momoka is invited by one of her friends to perform at a live house in Suwa. While making travel preparations, Nina is surprised by the visit of her sister Suzune, who shows concern for Nina's future and warns she might not be welcomed back by the family if she gives up on her studies. Shin-Kawasaki later sets out for Suwa, where Nina also learns about Rupa and Tomo's backgrounds. They meet Momoka's contact Mine, who reserves them to the live house and is impressed with their skills. While rehearsing, Momoka announces their performance would be her last before quitting the band again, jeopardizing Nina's plans. Mine later notices a troubled Nina and they talk on the circumstances of quitting music, with Mine expressing her fear of failing after setting high hopes; she however advises not to dwell on that fear, inspiring Nina. On the day of their live house performance, Nina proclaims to the audience and her bandmates their new name as Togenashi Togeari and announces she will be dropping out of cram school to continue her goal, shocking her bandmates.
8	"If You Were to Cry"; Transliteration: "Moshimo Kimi ga Naku Naraba" (Japanese: もしも君が泣くならば)	Miho Hirayama	Kazuo Sakai	May 25, 2024
In a flashback to Momoka's time in high school, she discusses with her Diamond Dust bandmates on dropping out to focus on their music career, with an idealistic Momoka assuring they will succeed. In the present, a furious Momoka argues with Nina on her brazen decision, forcing Subaru to calm the situation. Subaru points out to Momoka how Togenashi Togeari has been getting traction lately, proving Nina's goal is not impossible. Meanwhile, Nina begins to practice playing guitar and work part-time at Rupa and Tomo's restaurant. Momoka visits her during a shift and takes her to a Diamond Dust concert. Upon explaining the realities of surviving as a band, Momoka reveals she was compelled to form a new band after seeing her younger self in Nina. Nina slaps her, rejecting on being seen as a projection for Momoka, and makes her see that her music can reach and save people. Both girls and Diamond Dust meet and declare a duel between their bands at the upcoming music festival. Hina notices Nina but claims not to know her. Heading home, Nina confesses her love to Momoka, causing Momoka to cry as they reconcile.
9	"The Waning Moon Was Out"; Transliteration: "Kaketa Tsuki ga Deteita" (Japanese: 欠けた月が出ていた)	Masayuki Iimura	Ayako Hiraike	June 1, 2024
Togenashi Togeari rehearses a new song for the festival, though Momoka feels their song sounds generic. Tomo wishes to give feedback but hesitates and lies that she accepts the song as is, concerning Rupa as Tomo is not being honest. Nina offers Rupa and Tomo to watch her practice guitar and asks Tomo for feedback. Tomo bluntly criticizes her skills, surprising Nina. Flashbacks reveal Tomo's blunt feedback led to her and Rupa's bandmates quitting their previous band, leading Tomo to keep any feedback to herself. Nina asks Subaru for advice with talking to Tomo as Subaru points out she is a shy person who tends to lash out at people who reach out to her, similar to Nina; Tomo and Rupa also return, where Tomo lies to Nina on doing better with the practice as a way to reassure her before leaving ahead. Rupa recalls how she and Tomo formed Beni-Shouga after their previous band's dissolution. Rupa later takes Tomo to see Nina practicing her guitar and points out the rest of the band is serious about improving so they are open to her blunt advice. Once Tomo sees this, she criticizes Nina's skills again and Nina takes it to heart. Assured by this experience, Tomo gives feedback to Momoka during their next rehearsal that their song currently feels lacking, and Momoka agrees with the sentiment.
10	"Wandervogel"; Transliteration: "Wandāfōgeru" (Japanese: ワンダーフォーゲル)	Yasushi Tomoda	Kazuo Sakai	June 8, 2024
As Togenashi Togeari wonders if they have gained popularity, a talent scout named Shiomi Miura approaches and tells them she is willing to use her connections to attract a label if they perform well at the festival. As Nina writes lyrics, she is shocked to see her parents trying to visit her and avoids them. She is however persuaded by her bandmates and Suzune to make amends. Returning to Kumamoto, Nina reunites with her family as her father Muneo voices his dismay at Nina abandoning her studies for a music career. Muneo requests Nina to accompany him to her former school, where Muneo sides with Nina on the school's misconduct with her bullying case, surprising her. Nina later opens up to Suzune on how discovering Diamond Dust saved her from having suicidal thoughts caused by the bullying and brought her peace in finding her true passion. Suzune also reveals how much the family still cares for her despite past events, causing Nina to cry. Before returning to Kawasaki, Nina learns of Muneo accepting her career and she asks him to watch her perform at the festival. She regroups with Togenashi Togeari to showcase her lyrics, sporting a more positive outlook.
11	"The Center of the World"; Transliteration: "Sekai no Mannaka" (Japanese: 世界のまん中)	Miho Hirayama	Kazuo Sakai	June 15, 2024
With the festival approaching, Togenashi Togeari conducts final rehearsals, and they aim to perform for a bigger audience. Momoka also takes the band to the festival grounds to see the venue, and she and Nina feel confident in challenging Diamond Dust as the band notices how much Nina has positively matured recently; when Subaru sees these changes, she reflects on having not yet told Tendou her interest in pursuing music rather than acting. Each of the girls discuss with one another on their reasons and motivations of getting into music. On the day of the festival, Subaru talks to Nina on having messaged her grandmother with her band career after being inspired by Nina's actions, pleasing Nina. Togenashi Togeari later watches Diamond Dust's opening set as they see Diamond Dust openly take on their duel, motivating Togenashi Togeari to perform better at their own set, emotionally giving their all with Nina's song and drawing in a large audience.
12	"The Sky Darkens Again"; Transliteration: "Sora ga Mata Kuraku Naru" (Japanese: 空がまた暗くなる)	Masayuki Iimura	Sōichi Masui	June 22, 2024
Shiomi signs Togenashi Togeari to her agency sometime after the festival and works as their agent, with Momoka noting how their career is just getting started. The band holds an afterparty that evening as they reminisce on working hard to reach their current point, which Momoka uses as inspiration to write a new song. Some days later, the band rehearses Momoka's song for several weeks, expressing excitement to perform what they feel to a wider audience. During a rehearsal, Shiomi forwards to Togenashi Togeari an offer for a two-day battle of the bands against Diamond Dust, with the prize of producing a theme song being offered to whoever amasses the most earnings and audience. Sensing that Diamond Dust may be setting them up, Togenashi Togeari plans to back out, but Shiomi states her concern they might fade into obscurity if they do so; Nina is determined to nevertheless perform in the concert. Nina takes the band to a shrine where she reassures them to believe in themselves as the band prays in wishing their song to pull millions of views and sales. A month later, Nina checks out the finished song and is shocked to see it garnering only a hundred views.
13	"Rock 'n' Roll Will Never Stop"; Transliteration: "Rokku `n` Rōru wa Nari Yamanai" (Japanese: ロックンロールは鳴り止まないっ)	Kazuo Sakai	Kazuo Sakai	June 29, 2024
In a flashback to Nina's time in high school, Nina shares to Hina her desire to help a student getting bullied, but Hina warns she would be made as the next target and would not be siding with her as Nina heads off to intervene. In the present, Togenashi Togeari and Shiomi discuss the poor reception of the song despite their online popularity showing otherwise. Nina reluctantly reconnects with Hina as she reveals Shiomi approached Diamond Dust for a compromise for them to perform on both days for Togenashi Togeari to break even. After relaying to the band of the news, they meet with Shiomi to decline the offer and resign from the agency, which Shiomi gracefully accepts. Each of the girls make a promise to one another on continuing as a band. On the day of Togenashi Togeari's performance on the battle of the bands, they are glad to see a smaller but much more dedicated audience of fans turn out. Nina sees Hina in the crowd and talks about her past and how Diamond Dust's songs were an inspiration to her when she realizes that Hina was inspired by Diamond Dust as well, showing that Hina does not hold any ill will towards her. Togenashi Togeari then performs their new song proudly for their fans as Hina and the rest of Diamond Dust watch on, thanking the audience after finishing their set.

=== Games ===
==== Girls Band Cry First Riff ====
On August 31, 2024, after the anime's streaming marathon on their official YouTube channel, the main cast announced that a mobile game is in development, with auditions for new cast members to be performing as a band being currently held.

On September 23, 2025, the official Japanese social media accounts of Girls Band Cry revealed that the game would be titled Girls Band Cry First Riff (ガールズバンドクライ First Riff) and developed by Donuts Games, with a teaser trailer being also released. The game will feature Togenashi Togeari alongside three new bands: Canna Lily, F-272, and Kuzumi Mizuku.

==== Other games ====
Another game, titled Momoka (wo) Wasshoi (桃香（を）ワッショイ), was announced on September 13, 2025. The game, which is inspired by the fifth episode of the anime series, was released on September 29 for Windows via Steam during the Tokyo Game Show.

=== Manga ===
A manga adaptation illustrated by Boiru Iseebi began serialization in Micro Magazine's Comic Ride web magazine and RaiComi website on January 30, 2026.

No.	Japanese release date	Japanese ISBN
1	June 29, 2026	978-4-86716-988-9

== Future ==
Hanada tweeted from his Twitter account before the twelfth episode's airing addressing the risks of relying on making sales from an original anime like Girls Band Cry, adding that because of these risks, no current plans for a second season or movie succeeding the anime have been made. After the finale aired, the project tweeted on its official Twitter account that the story will still progress in the future and it, alongside Togenashi Togeari, shall continue to be supported through its real-life activities.

On July 12, 2024, however, it was announced that Natsu and Mirei both went on an indefinite hiatus due to poor health. The remaining three main cast members will be still performing in Togenashi Togeari. On April 10, 2025, it was later announced that Natsu and Mirei would be returning to dubbing.

On September 23, 2025, it was announced that a sequel anime film has been greenlit for production. The film, titled Girls Band Cry: The Movie, is set to release in Japan on May 21, 2027, with much of the staff and cast returning.

== See also ==
- K-On! – band music anime with some episodes written by Jukki Hanada
- Sound! Euphonium – band music anime written by Jukki Hanada
