= Magical Shopping Arcade Abenobashi =

Japanese anime television series

- North American DVD cover of the complete series

アベノ橋魔法☆商店街 (Abenobashi Mahō Shōtengai)
- Genre: Comedy; Isekai; Parody
- Created by: Gainax
- Manga

Manga Abenobashi Mahō Shōtengai
- Written by: Kenji Tsuruta
- Published by: Kodansha
- Imprint: Afternoon KC
- Magazine: Monthly Afternoon
- Original run: July 25, 2001 – February 25, 2003
- Volumes: 1
- Manga
- Written by: Satoru Akahori
- Illustrated by: Ryūsei Deguchi
- Published by: Kodansha
- English publisher: NA: Tokyopop
- Imprint: Magazine Z KC
- Magazine: Monthly Magazine Z
- Original run: July 26, 2001 – June 26, 2002
- Volumes: 2
- Anime television series
- Directed by: Hiroyuki Yamaga; Masayuki Kojima (unit)
- Produced by: Hiroyuki Yamaga; Masafumi Fukui; Taiji Suinou; Toshimichi Ootsuki
- Written by: Hiroyuki Yamaga; Satoru Akahori
- Music by: Shirō Sagisu
- Studio: Gainax; Madhouse
- Licensed by: NA: AEsir Holdings
- Original network: Kids Station, Sun TV, KBS, tvk, TV Saitama
- English network: US: Anime Network, G4 (Anime Unleashed)
- Original run: April 4, 2002 – June 27, 2002
- Episodes: 13
- icon

Magical Shopping Arcade Abenobashi (Japanese: アベノ橋魔法☆商店街, Hepburn: Abenobashi Mahō Shōtengai) is a Japanese anime television series created by Gainax, with animation produced by Gainax and Madhouse, and directed by Hiroyuki Yamaga. It was broadcast for 13 episodes on Kids Station from April to June 2002. The series was licensed for English release in North America by ADV Films.

A manga adaptation, authored by Satoru Akahori and illustrated by Ryūsei Deguchi, was serialized in Kodansha's seinen manga magazine Monthly Magazine Z from July 2001 to June 2002, with its chapters collected in two tankōbon volumes. It was licensed for English release in North America by Tokyopop. Another manga by Kenji Tsuruta, titled Manga Abenobashi Mahō Shōtengai, was serialized in Kodansha's seinen manga magazine Monthly Afternoon from July 2001 to February 2003.

== Story ==
=== Background ===
During the Heian Era (794–1185), Abe no Seimei was a close childhood friend of a noble named Masayuki, and his wife, Mune. While he was away from the palace, Masayuki often asked Seimei to stay by his wife's side, guarding her and keeping her company. However, during the time that they spent together, Mune and Seimei fell in love and became increasingly romantically involved. Unbeknownst to them, Masayuki soon learned of the affair, and became overcome with grief and jealousy. One day while Seimei was on a trip to Kyoto, Masayuki snapped, murdered Mune and committed suicide. Guided by a premonition, Seimei rushed back to his hometown only to find out that he was too late. Overcome with guilt, he decided to perform a forbidden onmyō, ritual to resurrect the dead, by transferring himself and the bodies of Masayuki and Mune into a completely different world in which they were still alive. In doing so, Seimei soon found himself as "Mr. Abe" in mid-20th-century Osaka, where Mune Imamiya and Masayuki Asahina were pre-existing residents of this alternate world. Now, Masayuki was an ambitious, but largely unsuccessful young man who had enlisted Mr. Abe's assistance to build the Abenobashi Shopping Arcade. He was also madly in love with Mune, a local girl whom he tried to woo (with little success) at every possible occasion. It was not long, however, before Mune fell in love with Abe, constantly pursuing him and offering him bento. Abe tried for a time to resist her advances, but eventually he was unable to contain his feelings, and had sex with Mune in his apartment. Unbeknownst to them, an instantly-jealous Masayuki accidentally discovered the truth. The next night he became staggeringly drunk and invited Abe to meet him at the Abeno Shrine, planning to murder him with a hidden butcher knife when he arrived. At first unsuspecting, Abe arrived on the scene, but once he saw the decrepitly drunk Masa he knew what was afoot. He promptly bid Masayuki farewell, then disappeared, going back to his job in the Heian Era, leaving a pregnant Mune behind him; her child is Sasshi's father.

=== Plot ===
Childhood friends Arumi and Sasshi are residents of the Abenobashi commercial district in Abeno-ku, Osaka. After an accident, they find themselves transported to an alternate sword and sorcery world. Their attempt to get back to reality finds them traversing a series of nonsensical worlds built on science fiction, war, fantasy, dating sim games and American movies. Each alternate Abenobashi is a surreal manifestation of Sasshi's otaku interests, populated by analogs of the protagonist's relatives and acquaintances and a blue-haired stranger known as Eutus.

Their quest to return home is at its core a bildungsroman because the Abenobashi dimensions are mostly hobby worlds of increasing sophistication. Sasshi does not want to go home, and in fact is the sole force that is propelling them between worlds. While chasing a cat in the first episode, Arumi's grandfather fell off a roof and was hospitalized. With this new trauma pressuring him in addition to his apprehension about the eventual destruction of the shopping arcade and the Asahina's moving away, Sasshi was no longer willing or able to cope with reality, and unbeknownst to even himself, he had caused their dimension to rewrite itself into worlds echoing his escapist obsessions.

== Characters ==
=== Main characters ===
Satoshi "Sasshi" Imamiya (今宮 聖志, Imamiya Satoshi)
Voiced by: Tomo Saeki (Japanese); Luci Christian (English)
Sayaka's younger brother, he is a precocious, hyperactive, 12-year-old typical Osakan boy. He has a huge passion for collecting, role-playing games, sci-fi, dinosaurs, guns and visual novels. Sasshi's family used to run the local bathhouse, the Turtle Bath, but was forced to give it up and move out due to redevelopment plans for the Abenobashi Shopping Arcade area. Sasshi spends his lazy days hanging out with his best friend Arumi. While visiting each world, Sasshi is quick to learn the gimmick behind each one, and eventually begins playing by the world's "rules". It is strongly hinted he has feelings for Arumi, and is preventing them from going back due to the fact she will leave for Hokkaido.
Arumi Asahina (朝比奈 あるみ, Asahina Arumi)
Voiced by: Yuki Matsuoka (Japanese); Jessica Boone (English)
Sasshi's best friend and classmate, she is also 12 years old, having practically grown up together with him in the Abenobashi Shopping Arcade. A sensible and pragmatic girl who is a foil to Sasshi. Arumi's eccentric father and stubborn grandfather run a French restaurant in the Shopping Arcade known as the Grill Pelican. It appears, however, that the Asahina family will be closing up shop in the near future as part of redevelopment in the area and moving to Hokkaido, forcing Arumi to leave Sasshi behind. She expresses a strong distaste for every world that she and Sasshi visit.

=== Other characters ===
Eutus (ユータス, Yūtasu)
Voiced by: Rikiya Koyama (Japanese); Chris Patton (English)
A recurring element of the Abenobashi dimensions who shares a bond with Sasshi, claiming to be doomed to wander dimensions until the cause of this misfortune is rectified. His real identity is the legendary onmyoji Abe no Seimei, ultimately the one who created the Abenobashi Shopping Arcade in the guise of Mr. Abe. This in turn enables the existence of Sasshi and Arumi, with Abe being the former's (illegitimate) paternal grandfather.
Masayuki Asahina "Grandpa Masa" (雅ジイ, "Masa-jii")
Voiced by: Takeshi Aono (Japanese); Andy McAvin, John Gremillion (young) (English)
Arumi's stubborn and willful grandfather and the founder of the Grill Pelican restaurant, Masayuki has been around since the creation of the shopping arcade and befriended its head of construction Abe. In reality, Masayuki was originally a friend of Abe in the past, committing the murder of his wife Mune out of jealously towards Abe and taking his own life. Though Abe managed to revive the two in the modern era, history nearly repeated itself and Abe is forced to leave the two to look after Abenobashi. However, Masayuki succumbs to injuries he receives in a fall from the roof of the Grille Pelican and dies. Sasshi's refusal to accept that reality is one of the reasons why he and Arumi are unable to return to their dimension, with Masayuki often depicted as a figure of high authority or importance in each parallel world.
Mune-Mune (ムネムネ)
Voiced by: Aya Hisakawa (Japanese); Kaytha Coker (English)
A voluptuous bespectacled redhead in the assorted Abenobashi dimensions in various roles from antagonist to comedic relief, which are always undertaken with great flair that stand her against even the surreal background of the hobby worlds. Mune-Mune is nearly always searching for Eutus, the reason tied to the fact that she is a parallel version of Sasshi's paternal grandmother Mune Imamiya in her youth, Originally, in Abe's time she was Masayuki's wife and her falling in love with Abe led to her death by her husband's hand. In his attempt to resolve this, Abe managed to revive Mune in the modern age. However, history nearly repeated itself and Abe left with Mune's heart broken. She married and started a family while running the Turtle Bath before she died of natural cases. The name Mune, literally translates to "chest" is a pun upon her parallel self's prominent breasts.
Ms. Aki (アキ姉)
Voiced by: Kouji Ishii (Japanese); Jason Douglas (English)
A cross-dressing man with an overly-affectionate auntie-type attitude. Being a lifelong resident of the Abenobashi Shopping Arcade, he is quite knowledgeable about the history of the area and its people. In each parallel world, he is often depicted in various comedic female roles.
Sayaka Imamiya (今宮 沙也香･小鬼, Imamiya Sayaka)
Voiced by: Akemi Okamura (Japanese); Monica Rial (English)
Sasshi's older sister. A stereotypical teenage girl, she is quite intent on being cool by shying away from the family's Osaka influences. She diets and has an interest in fortune telling. Sayaka shows up within the Abenobashi dimensions accompanying Mune-mune and Ms. Aki.
Kouhei (幸平さん, Kōhei-san)
Voiced by: Katsuyuki Konishi (Japanese); John Gremillion (English)
A shady businessman who runs a stall selling food as well as many different trinkets that may or may not be as helpful as he claims. Kouhei always seems to have a friendly aside for Sasshi and Arumi – especially when he perceives the opportunity to wring them for money. He is depicted in each parallel world as some sort of vendor.
Arata Imamiya (今宮 新, Imamiya Arata)
Voiced by: Naoki Tatsuta (Japanese); John Swasey (English)
Sasshi and Sayaka's father.
Mitsuyo Imamiya (今宮 満代, Imamiya Mitsuyo)
Voiced by: Kyoko Hikami (Japanese); Kira Vincent-Davis (English)
Sasshi and Sayaka's mother.
Tarou Imamiya (今宮 太郎, Imamiya Tarō)
Voiced by: Takeshi Watabe (Japanese); Mike MacRae (English)
Sasshi and Sayaka's grandfather.

== Media ==
=== Manga ===
A manga adaptation by Satoru Akahori and illustrated by Ryūsei Deguchi, was serialized in Kodansha's seinen manga magazine Monthly Magazine Z from July 26, 2001, (Note: Debuted in the magazine's September 2001 issue, released on July 26 of that same year.) to June 26, 2002. (Note: Finished in the magazine's August 2002 issue, released on June 26 of that same year.) Its chapters were collected in two tankōbon volumes, released on March 22 and July 23, 2002. The manga was licensed for English release in North America by Tokyopop, who published both volumes on August 10 and November 9, 2004, respectively. The manga went out of print in 2009.

Another manga adaptation by Kenji Tsuruta, titled Manga Abenobashi Mahō Shōtengai: Abeno no Machi ni Inori o Komete (まんが アベノ橋魔法☆商店街 ―アベノの街に祈りを込めて―; lit. 'Manga Magical Shopping Arcade Abenobashi: Praying for the City of Abeno'), was serialized in Kodansha's seinen manga magazine Monthly Afternoon from July 25, 2001, (Note: Debuted in the magazine's September 2001 issue.) to February 25, 2003. (Note: Finished in the magazine's April 2003 issue.) Kodansha collected some of its chapters in a single tankōbon volume, released on April 23, 2002.

=== Anime ===
Magical Shopping Arcade Abenobashi was produced by Gainax and Madhouse. The series is directed by Hiroyuki Yamaga and Masayuki Kojima, with series composition by Yamaga and Satoru Akahori and screenplay by Jukki Hanada. The original character designs were done by Kenji Tsuruta. The music was composed by Shirō Sagisu. The series run for 13 episodes on Kids Station from April 4 to June 27, 2002.

In North America, ADV Films announced the series' acquisition at Anime Boston in April 2003. The series was launched in four DVDs from December 16, 2003, to April 20, 2004. The series aired on G4's anime block Anime Unleashed in 2005. It also aired online on Anime Network in 2009. AEsir Holdings re-released the series on a single DVD volume on December 11, 2012.

==== Episodes ====
| No. | Title | Directed by | Written by | Original release date | U.S. air date |
|---|---|---|---|---|---|
| 1 | "Mystery! Abenobashi ☆ Shopping Arcade"; Transliteration: "Fushigi! Abeno-bashi ☆ Shōtengai" (Japanese: 不思議! アベノ橋☆商店街) | Masahiko Ōtsuka | Hiroyuki Yamaga | April 4, 2002 | February 8, 2005 |
Many of the local shops are going out of business and a new shopping area is coming. And now Sasshi and Arumi soon find that they are not in Osaka anymore, and instead, have suddenly been transported to a strange and magical world.
| 2 | "Adventure! Abenobashi ☆ Sword and Sorcery Shopping Arcade (RPG world)" Transliteration: "Bōken! Abeno-bashi ☆ Ken to Mahō Shōtengai" (Japanese: 冒険! アベノ橋☆剣と魔法商店街) | Masayuki Kojima | Satoru Akahori; Hiroyuki Yamaga | April 11, 2002 | February 8, 2005 |
Osaka is gone, Arumi and Sasshi find themselves in a world full of dragons and strange mythical creatures. All the familiar faces from back home are here, but with completely different personalities, and the two are suddenly enlisted to conquer an evil force.
| 3 | "Hook Up! Abenobashi ☆ Great Milky Way Shopping Arcade (Science fiction world)" Transliteration: "Gattai! Abeno-bashi ☆ Daiginga Shōtengai" (Japanese: 合体! アベノ橋☆大銀河商店街) | Hiroyuki Imaishi | Satoru Akahori | April 18, 2002 | February 9, 2005 |
Sasshi and Arumi believed that a strange goblin they encountered when they first arrived in the Middle Ages would have the power to send them home. Now they are stuck in a futuristic version of their home, and mecha combat may be their only means of escape.
| 4 | "Fire It Up! Abenobashi ☆ Hong Kong Combat Shopping Arcade (Martial arts world)" Transliteration: "Moeyo! Abeno-bashi ☆ Honkon Kakutō Shōtengai" (Japanese: 燃えよ! アベノ橋☆香港格闘商店街) | Shirō Ebisu | Jukki Hanada | April 25, 2002 | February 9, 2005 |
It seems that the goblin just cannot get things right. Another attempt to send Arumi and Sasshi back home finds them now in Hong Kong, and Sasshi is enlisted to train and be a part of an upcoming tournament. He may not know martial arts, but he will have more than enough knowledge by the time this is over. Now, if the goblin could just get things straight, this would all be over.
| 5 | "Extinction! Abenobashi ☆ Ancient Dinosaur Shopping Arcade (Prehistoric world)" Transliteration: "Zetsumetsu! Abeno-bashi ☆ Kodai Kyōryū Shōtengai" (Japanese: 絶滅! アベノ橋☆古代恐竜商店街) | Atsushi Takahashi | Satoru Akahori | May 2, 2002 | February 10, 2005 |
Sasshi and Arumi thought for sure that they were going back home this time. Instead, they find themselves in a prehistoric version of their home, complete with the usual cast of strange relatives that they have grown accustomed to seeing. But, they soon have more problems when they are on the run from the natives and trying to get a baby dinosaur back to his family.
| 6 | "In the Night Fog! Abenobashi ☆ Hard Boiled Shopping Arcade (Hardboiled world)" Transliteration: "Yogiri no! Abeno-bashi ☆ Hādoboirudo Shōtengai" (Japanese: 夜霧の! アベノ橋☆ハードボイルド商店街) | Hiroyuki Ochi | Jukki Hanada | May 9, 2002 | February 10, 2005 |
Now, Sasshi and Arumi are in a new version of their home that has a vibe very similar to 1930s gangster films, but they both end up working on opposite sides, unintentionally of course. Just like everything else, things are not always what them seem, especially when it comes to killing.
| 7 | "Flashback! Birth of the ☆ Magical Shopping Arcade (Abenobashi during the late 1950s during the Allied occupation)" Transliteration: "Kaisō! Mahō Shōtengai ☆ Tanjō" (Japanese: 回想! 魔法商店街☆誕生) | Masahiko Ōtsuka | Hiroyuki Yamaga | May 16, 2002 | February 11, 2005 |
There are no wacky themes here. Instead, it is a more somber look at how the magical shopping arcade was born, as told from those that were there some 50 years ago. It does not explain what is going on in Arumi and Sasshi's case, however, but it reveals some other important information.
| 8 | "Set Your Heart Aflutter! Abenobashi ☆ Campus Shopping Arcade (Dating sim world)" Transliteration: "Tokimeke! Abeno-bashi ☆ Gakuen Shōtengai" (Japanese: ときめけ! アベノ橋☆学園商店街) | Mitsuyuki Masuhara | Jukki Hanada | May 23, 2002 | February 11, 2005 |
Sasshi thinks that he and Arumi might have made it back to their world until he notices all of the cute high school girls wandering around in droves. It is at that point he realizes that they have found their way into a dating simulation video game. Sasshi of course could not be happier, but things are not so good for Arumi, who has been transformed in a goblin (and is much shorter than she would like to be), and that is just one of the many things that are infuriating her.
| 9 | "It Cries! The Bush Warbler ☆ Heiankyo (Abenobashi during the Heian period)" Transliteration: "Naku yo! Uguisu ☆ Heiankyō" (Japanese: 泣くよ! うぐいす☆平安京) | Atsushi Takahashi | Hiroyuki Yamaga | May 30, 2002 | February 12, 2005 |
Arumi has left Sasshi out of pure frustration, probably because she looks like a goblin, and also probably due to the fact that she is grown over 50 feet high. Eutus, however, has agreed to help Sasshi get back home and reveals the truth to him, as well as their karmic connection. He decides to allow Sasshi to become a Onmyou apprentice, but the help he is going to receive from Eutus is going to be more than minimal.
| 10 | "Fluffy, Bubbly ♡ Abenobashi ☆ Fairy Tale Shopping Arcade (Fairy tale world)" Transliteration: "Powapowa ♡ Abeno-bashi ☆ Meruhen Shōtengai" (Japanese: ぽわぽわ♡アベノ橋☆メルヘン商店街) | Kentarō Nakamura | Jukki Hanada | June 6, 2002 | February 12, 2005 |
Determined to find the perfect place that will make Arumi happy, and where she will not have to deal with her grandfather's death, Sasshi puts the two of them in a fairy tale world. But Arumi is not happy at all. She is even less pleased when a giant teddy bear attacks the land and she is forced to take on the guise of a magic girl, complete with magic baton and annoying animal sidekick.
| 11 | "Resolution!! Abenobashi ☆ Battlefield Shopping Arcade (War world)" Transliteration: "Ketsudan!! Abeno-bashi ☆ Senjō Shōtengai" (Japanese: 決断!! アベノ橋☆戦場商店街) | Hiroyuki Ochi | Satoru Akahori | June 13, 2002 | February 15, 2005 |
After the troubles of the amusement park, Sasshi and Arumi are now at war. On both side of a conflict, the two armies fight for the Abenobashi Shopping Arcade. When it comes to war and clichés, it is all here in the chaos.
| 12 | "Huge Reversal?! Abenobashi ☆ Hollywood Shopping Arcade (Hollywood world)" Transliteration: "Daigyakuten!? Abeno-bashi ☆ Hariuddo Shōtengai" (Japanese: 大逆転!? アベノ橋☆ハリウッド商店街) | Mitsuyuki Masuhara | Jukki Hanada | June 20, 2002 | February 15, 2005 |
The two now find themselves in a world of Sasshi's favorite movies. He really enjoys the big Hollywood movies, from Raiders of the Lost Ark to Monty Python. It is all here and more inside Sasshi movie-land.
| 13 | "Return To Life! The Legendary Exorcist ☆"; Transliteration: "Yomigaere! Maboroshi no Onmyōji ☆" (Japanese: 甦れ! まぼろしの陰陽師☆) | Tadashi Hiramatsu | Hiroyuki Yamaga | June 27, 2002 | February 16, 2005 |
Arumi and Sasshi have finally made their way home, but Arumi's grandfather will still be dead. Sasshi refuses to let that happen, so he jumps again into another world. But in the end he cannot dream away reality.

== Reception ==
Magical Shopping Arcade Abenobashi received an Excellence Award for animation at the 2002 Japan Media Arts Festival.
