= Nurse Hitomi's Monster Infirmary =

Japanese manga series

- First tankōbon volume cover, featuring Hitomi Manaka

ヒトミ先生の保健室 (Hitomi-sensei no Hokenshitsu)
- Genre: Fantasy comedy; Slice of life
- Manga
- Written by: Shake-O
- Published by: Tokuma Shoten
- English publisher: NA: Seven Seas Entertainment
- Magazine: Monthly Comic Ryū
- Original run: 19 September 2013 – present
- Volumes: 21
- icon

Nurse Hitomi's Monster Infirmary (Japanese: ヒトミ先生の保健室, Hepburn: Hitomi-sensei no Hokenshitsu) is a Japanese manga series written and illustrated by Shake-O. It has been serialized in Tokuma Shoten's seinen manga magazine Monthly Comic Ryū since September 2013. It follows the daily life and adventures of Hitomi Manaka, a cyclops who works as a school nurse, and her co-workers and students dealing with their human (and not-so-human) problems. In North America, the series is licensed for English release by Seven Seas Entertainment.

== Plot ==
In a world where some individuals experience physical changes during puberty, Damoto Junior High school nurse Hitomi Manaka assists students experiencing conditions such as detachable limbs and shrinking.

== Characters ==
Hitomi Manaka (真中一美先生, Manaka Hitomi)
A cyclops and main heroine of the series who works as the school nurse, nicknamed Nurse Hitomi (ヒトミ先生, Hitomi-sensei). As a cyclops, and the eldest sibling in her family, despite her lack of depth perception, her eye allows her to observe any abnormalities in students to better help them.
Midori Itsuki (樹翠, Itsuki Midori)
A plant-based being of unknown gender who serves as Hitomi's assistant, keeping a record of all students with abnormalities who visit the nurse's office.
Nobuko Shitara (設楽伸子, Shitara Nobuko)
A 2nd year student from Class A whose tongue became elastic and grew to 320.5 cm in length, being the first of Hitomi's patients.
Yuki Moji (門司勇輝, Moji Yūki)
Class B's teacher at the school, a kind-hearted gentleman despite his initial imposing appearance due to fur covering his entire body.
Ken Tatara (多々良拳四郎, Tatara Kenshirō)
Class A's teacher, he is a childhood friend of Hitomi's and their parents' houses are next door to each other. He has two extra arms growing from his torso.
Haruna Tobita (鳶田陽菜, Tobita Haruna)
A winged girl and delinquent 2nd year student from Class B. She refuses to obey authority much of the time and is anti-social. She can fly, although it takes a lot out of her.
Naruki and Kaori Wakatsuki (若月成貴とカオリ, Watatsuki Naruki to Kaori)
Conjoined twin 2nd year students from Class D, Naruki being popular with the girls prior to Kaori appearing on his body. Kaori, identifying herself as female and initially a growth before becoming Naruki's right head, shares many of her brother's traits with admirers of her own.

== Publication ==
Shake-O began publishing the series in Tokuma Shoten's Monthly Comic Ryū magazine on 19 September 2013. The series moved to online-only serialization when Comic Ryū changed formats on 19 June 2018. Tokuma Shoten has collected its chapters into individual tankōbon volumes. The first volume was released on 13 March 2014. 21 volumes have been released as of 13 May 2026.

Seven Seas Entertainment licensed the series for publication in North America. Thirteen volumes have been published in English.

=== Volumes ===
No.	Original release date	Original ISBN	English release date	English ISBN
1	13 March 2014	978-4-19-950385-6	17 February 2015	978-1-626921-47-4
2	13 September 2014	978-4-19-950413-6	23 June 2015	978-1-626921-52-8
3	13 March 2015	978-4-19-950442-6	20 October 2015	978-1-626922-05-1
4	12 September 2015	978-4-19-950470-9	6 September 2016	978-1-626924-14-7
5	13 April 2016	978-4-19-950502-7	24 January 2017	978-1-626924-19-2
6	13 October 2016	978-4-19-950532-4	4 July 2017	978-1-626923-57-7
7	13 April 2017	978-4-19-950561-4	9 January 2018	978-1-626926-76-9
8	13 October 2017	978-4-19-950591-1	30 October 2018	978-1-626929-60-9
9	13 April 2017	978-4-19-950561-4	18 June 2019	978-1-642750-98-0
10	13 November 2018	978-4-19-950654-3	21 January 2020	978-1-645051-89-3
11	13 June 2019	978-4-19-950680-2	8 December 2020	978-1-645054-77-1
12	1 January 2020	978-4-19-950695-6	6 April 2021	978-1-645058-11-3
13	12 September 2020	978-4-19-950716-8	2 November 2021	978-1-648273-32-2
14	11 June 2021	978-4-19-950743-4	—	—
15	12 February 2022	978-4-19-950766-3	—	—
16	13 October 2022	978-4-19-950795-3	—	—
17	12 May 2023	978-4-19-950815-8	—	—
18	13 March 2024	978-4-19-950849-3	—	—
19	10 January 2025	978-4-19-950891-2	—	—
20	12 September 2025	978-4-19-950921-6	—	—
21	13 May 2026	978-4-19-950970-4	—	—

== Reception ==
Lynzee Loveridge ranked the series at number five on her list of "7 Manga for Monster Girl Lovers" on Anime News Network.
