= Xenon (manga) =

Japanese manga series

- First tankōbon volume cover

重機甲兵ゼノン (Jūki Kōhē Zenon)
- Genre: Action, science fiction
- Manga
- Written by: Masaomi Kanzaki
- Published by: Shogakukan
- English publisher: NA: Eclipse Comics (1987–1988); Viz Communications (1988–1993)
- Magazine: Shōnen Big Comic
- Original run: 1986 – 1987
- Volumes: 4
- Manga

Xenon: 199X R
- Written by: Masaomi Kanzaki
- Published by: Tokuma Shoten
- Magazine: Monthly Comic Ryū
- Original run: 2006 – 2011
- Volumes: 8

Xenon, also known as Heavy Metal Warrior Xenon (Japanese: 重機甲兵ゼノン, Hepburn: Jūki Kōhē Zenon), is a Japanese manga series written and illustrated by Masaomi Kanzaki. It was serialized in Shogakukan's shōnen manga magazine Shōnen Big Comic from 1986 to 1987, before being canceled abruptly. Its chapters were collected in four tankōbon volumes. In North America, the manga was published by Viz Communications in partnership with Eclipse Comics, with 23 issues released in comic book format from 1987 to 1988. Viz later released the four volumes from 1991 to 1992. A sequel to the series, titled Xenon: 199X R, started in Tokuma Shoten's seinen manga magazine Monthly Comic Ryū in 2006.

== Publication ==
Written and illustrated by Masaomi Kanzaki, Xenon was serialized in Shogakukan's shōnen manga magazine Shōnen Big Comic from 1986 to 1987, before being canceled abruptly. Shogakukan collected its chapters in four tankōbon volumes, released from June 1986 to June 1987. Kodansha republished the series in four volumes from November 19, 2000, to April 9, 2001.

In North America, the manga was published by Viz Communications in partnership with Eclipse Comics starting in 1987. 23 issues were released in a comic book format until November 1, 1988. Viz later released the four volumes from 1991 to 1992.

A sequel, titled Xenon: 199X R, started in Tokuma Shoten's seinen manga magazine Monthly Comic Ryū in 2006. Tokuma Shoten released the first tankōbon volume on September 20, 2007. The eighth and latest volume was released on July 4, 2011.

== Reception ==
The French website Manga News regarded the first volume as "a good action manga if you like the author or the genre, but dispensable for others". While praising the art, the Manga News reviewer felt the story was unoriginal. He felt that the "non-stop action" prevented the series from sinking into caricatures, and noted that the popularity of the manga kept the manga going into a fourth volume, and found the last volume "most interesting".
