= Spirit of Wonder =

Japanese manga series

- Wideban volume cover
- Genre: Steampunk
- Manga
- Written by: Kenji Tsuruta
- Published by: Kodansha
- English publisher: NA: Dark Horse Comics
- Imprint: Morning KC Deluxe
- Magazine: Weekly Morning; (1986–1988); Monthly Afternoon; (November 25, 1989 – November 25, 1994)
- Original run: 1986 – 1994
- Volumes: 1
- Original video animation

Miss China's Ring
- Directed by: Mitsuru Hongo
- Written by: Michiru Shimada
- Music by: Kohei Tanaka
- Studio: Ajia-do Animation Works
- Licensed by: NA: AnimEigo
- Released: June 3, 1992
- Runtime: 42 minutes
- Original video animation
- Directed by: Takashi Annō
- Music by: Hayato Matsuo
- Studio: Ajia-do Animation Works
- Licensed by: NA: Bandai Entertainment
- Released: January 25, 2001 – January 23, 2004
- Episodes: 5
- icon

Spirit of Wonder is a Japanese anthology manga series written and illustrated by Kenji Tsuruta. It was serialized in Kodansha's seinen manga magazines Morning (1986 to 1988) and Monthly Afternoon (1989 to 1994). A single-episode original video animation (OVA) animated by Ajia-do Animation Works and released by Toshiba-EMI, Spirit of Wonder: Miss China's Ring, was released in 1992. Another five-episode OVA was produced and released by Bandai Visual from 2001 to 2004.

== Overview ==
Spirit of Wonder consists of self-contained short stories, whose common factor is that they revolve around scientists developing absurd inventions, with plots involving treasure hunting, time travel or space travel. The stories are inspired by science fiction authors like H. G. Wells, Jules Verne, and Edmond Hamilton. The title was inspired by the Spirit of St. Louis aircraft, flown by Charles Lindbergh on the first solo nonstop transatlantic flight. The first nine chapters, which were published in Weekly Morning, feature different protagonists, times, and places, while the last three chapters, which were published in Monthly Afternoon, feature the only recurrent protagonist, Miss China.

== Media ==
=== Manga ===
Written and illustrated by Kenji Tsuruta, Spirit of Wonder was irregularly published for 12 chapters (including a pilot chapter) in Kodansha's seinen manga magazines Weekly Morning (and its special editions) and Monthly Afternoon from 1986 to 1994. (Note: List of chapters and magazines: Chapter 0—Weekly Morning #38 (1986); Chapter 1—Morning Open Zōkan #4 (1987); Chapter 2—Morning Open Zōkan #5 (1987); Chapter 3—Weekly Morning #14 (1987); Chapter 4—Weekly Morning #20 (1987); Chapter 5—Weekly Morning #30 (1987); Chapter 6—Morning Colorful Zōkan #2 (1987); Chapter 7—Weekly Morning #42 (1987); Chapter 8—Weekly Morning #1 (1988); Chapter 9—Monthly Afternoon (January 1990) (Note: The issue was published in November 25, 1989.); Chapter 10—Monthly Afternoon (May 1991); Chapter 11—Monthly Afternoon (January 1995) (Note: The issue was published in November 25, 1994.)) Kodansha released a collected volume (numbered as first) on March 23, 1988, under the title The Spirit of Wonder; years later, when the series was finished, a single 407-page wideban volume, which collected the twelve chapters, was released on August 22, 1997.

In North America, Dark Horse Comics and Studio Proteus partially published the series in five issues (only publishing the Miss China stories), from April 1, 1996, to August 1, 1996; they were later collected in a single 152-page volume on June 24, 1998.

==== Chapter list ====
| No. | Japanese release date | Japanese ISBN |
|---|---|---|
| 1 | August 22, 1997 | 4-06-319845-6 |
00. "What a Vast and Wonderful Universe" (広くてすてきな宇宙じゃないか, Hirokute Sutekina Uchū Janai ka); 01. "Leaving One Night by the Light of the Full Moon" (満月の夜月へ行く, Mangetsu no Yatsuki e Iku); 02. "To Invoke the Stars" (星に願いを, Hoshi ni Negai wo); 03. "Little Melancholy" (リトルメランコリア, Ritoru Merankoria); 04. "The Young Scientists' Club" (少年科学倶楽部, Shōnen Kagaku Kurabu); 05. "See You Later, God Willing" (潮風よ縁があったらまた逢おう, Shiokaze yo Enga Attara Mata Aō); 06. "Marsy in the Land of Time" (時間の国のマージィ, Jikan no Kuni no Mājii); 07. "Natsuko" (夏子); 08. "The Young Scientist Club on Mars" (少年科学倶楽部火星へ, Shōnen Kagaku Kurabu Kasei e); 09. "Miss China's Melancholy" (チャイナさんの憂鬱, Chaina-san no Yūutsu); 10. "Miss China's Wish" (チャイナさんの願事, Chaina-san no Negai-goto); 11. "Miss China Strikes Back" (チャイナさんの逆襲, Chaina-san no Gyakushū)

=== Original video animations ===
==== Miss China's Ring ====
An original video animation (OVA) episode, animated by Ajia-do Animation Works and released by Toshiba-EMI, titled Spirit of Wonder: Miss China's Ring (The Spirit of Wonder チャイナさんの憂鬱, Supiritto Obu Wandā Chaina-san no Yūutsu; lit. 'Miss China's Melancholy'), was released on June 3, 1992. In North America, the first OVA was licensed by AnimEigo and released on LaserDisc in February 1996; they later released it on DVD on January 10, 2001; however, three months later, AnimeEigo announced that it would go out of print.

==== 2001 OVA ====
Another four-episode OVA was produced and distributed by Bandai Visual. It included two stories: "Scientific Boys Club" (少年科學倶楽部, Shōnen Kagaku Kurabu) (two parts) and "Miss China Short Stories" (チャイナさん 短編集, Chaina-san Tanpenshū) (two short episodes; "Miss China's Shrinking" and "Miss China's Planet"). Two DVDs were released on January 25 and July 25, 2001. A "Wonder Box" DVD box set, which included the 1992 OVA, the four-episode OVA, and an exclusive short, "Miss China's Sakazuki" (チャイナさんの盃, Chaina-san no Sakazuki), was released on January 23, 2004. In North America, the four-episode OVA was licensed by Bandai Entertainment; it was released on September 16, 2003. In Europe, it was released by Beez Entertainment; unlike the other English releases, it included the "Miss China's Sakazuki" short (English-subbed only). In Australia and New Zealand, the OVA was released by Madman Entertainment on June 21, 2006.

== Reception ==
=== Manga ===
Eugene Cheng of EX reviewed the Dark Horse edition, which contained only the Miss China chapters, and praised the series for its beautiful art, unique style, and delightful characters within a charming story. Cheng commended Kenji Tsuruta's artwork and his skillful use of scenery, perspective, and contrast, ultimately declaring the series one of the best manga available in America at the time. Manga critic Jason Thompson noted that the detailed artwork lived up to the series' name, creating a sweet, unresolved love story reminiscent of Kozue Amano's work, such as Aqua and Aria, where characters often pause to admire the scenery. Thompson described the Miss China stories as enjoyable but slight, lacking a definitive ending. Kevin Pezzano of SciFi.com found Tsuruta's artwork breathtaking, with incredibly detailed yet clear linework, but considered the story inferior, somewhat unclear, and ultimately forgettable. Pezzano criticized the frequent fanservice, noting that panty shots sometimes seemed more numerous than story panels, and concluded that readers should appreciate the art and concepts while overlooking Miss China's exaggerated accent. Mariela Ortiz, also writing for SciFi.com, similarly praised the painstakingly detailed artwork, which required more than just reading to understand the story. While Ortiz also noted the fanservice, she considered it an expected element of the genre.

In a review of the complete manga, Mario Vuk of Splash Comics appreciated the series' anthological format and highlighted Tsuruta's use of hatching, which gave the art a classic appearance. He found the artwork very appealing and rich in detail, and deemed the overall work a beautiful piece with classic charm and a moderate amount of comedy. Conversely, Andrés Accorsi of Comiqueando acknowledged Tsuruta's artwork as the main feature but identified significant flaws in the scripts. Accorsi felt the conflicts lacked dramatic force and that Tsuruta wasted many pages on inconsequential scenes, concluding that the series became entangled in ridiculous, whimsical, and poorly resolved situations.

=== Miss China's Ring ===
Christopher Macdonald of Anime News Network (ANN) described the OVA as unique, very weird, and very fun. He noted that Tsuruta's original character designs and artwork were nicely complemented by good animation, and recommended it to those seeking a short, heartwarming story devoid of heavy material, though he cautioned that viewers seeking a strong, complicated plot would likely be disappointed. Mariela Ortiz of SciFi.com observed that the characters, particularly Miss China with her accent and fighting skills, came off as stereotypical, though she noted this did not detract from the story. Ortiz called the OVA a funny and heartwarming tale. Shu-Chun Lin, also for SciFi.com, deemed it a lovely and cute love story that was very enjoyable and entertaining despite its simplicity.

Mike Toole of Anime Jump described the OVA as a nice break from typical action and comedy fare but found it surprisingly insubstantial, wishing for more narrative depth. Chris Beveridge of AnimeOnDVD praised the animation, noting several nice sequences, and stated he enjoyed the show immensely, recommending it to those looking for something off the beaten path. Jim Lazar, also of AnimeOnDVD, found the story charming, centered on Miss China's attraction to Jim and one of the doctor's inventions. He noted that while not an epic, the tale was charming and engaging throughout its short runtime. Writing for Otaku USA, Paul Chapman found the title character somewhat stereotypical and the animation adequate but not spectacular, with a soft, gentle color palette suited to the wistful tone. Chapman concluded that the OVA was not bad but also not outstanding.
