= Hour of the Zombie =

Japanese manga series

- The cover of the first volume of Hour of the Zombie

異骸‐THE PLAY DEAD/ALIVE- (Igai: The Play Dead/Alive)
- Genre: Zombie, horror
- Manga
- Written by: Tsukasa Saimura
- Published by: Tokuma Shoten
- English publisher: US: Seven Seas Entertainment
- Magazine: Monthly Comic Ryū
- Original run: January 18, 2014 – May 19, 2018
- Volumes: 9

Hour of the Zombie (異骸‐THE PLAY DEAD/ALIVE-, Igai: The Play Dead/Alive) is a manga series written and illustrated by Tsukasa Saimura. It is set at a high school where students suddenly become zombies. The manga was serialized in Tokuma Shoten's Monthly Comic Ryū manga magazine beginning in January 2014. The series ended in the final print issue of Comic Ryū in May 2018. The manga is licensed in the United States by Seven Seas Entertainment.

== Plot ==
Akira Nikaidou goes to school with his friends and crush, Kurumi. One day students suddenly turn into zombies. Then they stop attacking, what will be next for Akira and his remaining classmates?

== Publication ==
Written and illustrated by Tsukasa Saimura, Hour of the Zombie was serialized in Tokuma Shoten's Monthly Comic Ryū manga magazine from January 18, 2014, to May 19, 2018. The manga's chapters were compiled into nine tankōbon volumes from July 2014 to July 2018. The manga is licensed in English by Seven Seas Entertainment.

No.	Original release date	Original ISBN	English release date	English ISBN
1	July 11, 2014	978-4-19-950405-1	April 5, 2016	978-1-626923-06-5
2	February 13, 2015	978-4-19-950436-5	August 23, 2016	978-1-626923-13-3
3	July 13, 2015	978-4-19-950461-7	November 1, 2016	978-1-626923-54-6
4	February 13, 2016	978-4-19-950496-9	February 14, 2017	978-1-626924-23-9
5	July 13, 2016	978-4-19-950517-1	June 27, 2017	978-1-626924-89-5
6	February 13, 2017	978-4-19-950550-8	October 24, 2017	978-1-626925-60-1
7	July 13, 2017	978-4-19-950575-1	April 24, 2018	978-1-626926-89-9
8	February 13, 2018	978-4-19-950609-3	March 26, 2019	978-1-626929-95-1
9	July 13, 2018	978-4-19-950633-8	June 25, 2019	978-1-642750-96-6

== Reception ==
Reviewing the first volume, Rebecca Silverman of Anime News Network felt that the manga distinguished itself from other zombie stories with Saimura's depiction of the zombies as still having humanity, as well as the protagonist Akira's reaction to them.
