= All Eyes on Nekoyashiki-kun! Notice Me, Not My Characters =

Japanese manga series

- First volume cover, featuring Nekoyashiki (upper right) and Issei (upper left)

壁サー同人作家の猫屋敷くんは承認欲求をこじらせている (Kabe Sa Dōjin Sakka no Nekoyashiki-kun wa Shōnin Yokkyū o Kojiraseteiru)
- Genre: Comedy, boys' love
- Manga
- Written by: Kazuki Minamoto
- Published by: Tokuma Shoten
- English publisher: NA: J-Novel Club
- Imprint: Ryu Comics
- Magazine: Comic Ryū Web
- Original run: February 10, 2020 – present
- Volumes: 11
- Television drama
- Directed by: Tatsunori Satō
- Produced by: Yosuke Inakuma, Kota Yamazaki, and Muneo Miyagawa
- Written by: Shinya Hokimoto
- Music by: Yuta Mori
- Original network: ABC-TV
- Original run: October 3, 2022 – November 21, 2022
- Episodes: 8

All Eyes on Nekoyashiki-kun! Notice Me, Not My Characters (壁サー同人作家の猫屋敷くんは承認欲求をこじらせている, Kabe Sa Dōjin Sakka no Nekoyashiki-kun wa Shōnin Yokkyū o Kojiraseteiru; transl. 'Popular Indie Creator Nekoyashiki is Making His Yearning for Approval Worse'), abbreviated as KabeKoji (壁こじ) is a Japanese manga series written and illustrated by Kazuki Minamoto. It has been serialized on Comic Ryū Web since February 2020. KabeKoji follows the relationship between a gay creator of doujinshi (self-published manga) and a male idol. A live-action television drama adaptation produced by Asahi Broadcasting Corporation (ABC) aired from October to December 2022.

== Synopsis ==
Mamoru Nekoyashiki is doujinshi (self-published manga) creator who authors boys' love (male-male romance manga) under the pen name "Kōniku-sensei". Nekoyashiki is a highly popular creator at doujinshi conventions, (Note: "Kabe sa" in the series' title refers to "kabe circle" (壁サークル, kabe sākuru; "wall circle"), a slang term for doujinshi groups or "circles" that are popular enough to be placed along the wall of the convention venue for purposes of crowd management.) and uses this popularity to fulfill his desire for external validation. At a convention he has a chance reunion with Kazama Issei, a childhood friend he once had a crush on, and who now performs as an idol under the stage name "Issay".

== Media ==
=== Manga ===
All Eyes on Nekoyashiki-kun! Notice Me, Not My Characters began serialization on Comic Ryū Web in February 2020. The series has been released as eleven collected tankōbon volumes published by Tokuma Shoten.

In February 2026, J-Novel Club announced that they had licensed the series for digital English publication. During their panel at Anime Expo 2026, J-Novel Club announced that a print version would be released in February 2027.

No.	Original release date	Original ISBN	English release date	English ISBN
1	September 12, 2020	978-4199507175	April 29, 2026 (digital); February 23, 2027 (print)	978-1-7183-6441-7 (digital); 978-1-7183-3564-6 (print)
2	April 13, 2021	978-4199507373	August 5, 2026 (digital)	978-1-7183-6442-4 (digital)
3	November 12, 2021	978-4199507595	November 11, 2026 (digital)	978-1-7183-6443-1 (digital)
4	June 13, 2022	978-4199507694	—	—
5	October 13, 2022	978-4199507946	—	—
6	February 13, 2023	978-4199508011	—	—
7	July 13, 2023	978-4199508196	—	—
8	March 13, 2024	978-4199508479	—	—
9	November 13, 2024	978-4199508776	—	—
10	September 12, 2025	978-4199509223	—	—
11	May 13, 2026	978-4199509711	—	—

=== Television drama ===
A live-action television drama adaptation of KabeKoji produced by ABC was announced on June 9, 2022, and aired from October 3, to November 21, 2022, broadcasting on ABC-TV and streaming on Rakuten TV and TVer. The series stars Koudai Matsuoka as Nekoyashiki and Masaki Nakao as Issei, with Tatsunori Satō as director, Shinya Hokimoto as writer, music by Yuta Mori, and Yosuke Inakuma, Kota Yamazaki, and Muneo Miyagawa as producers. Filming wrapped on the series on August 30, 2022.
