= Shinji Kajio =

Japanese writer

- Born: 24 December 1947 (age 78); Kumamoto, Japan
- Writing career
- Genres: Science fiction, fantasy
- Notable work: Emanon
- Notable awards: 1991 Nihon SF Taisho Award

Shinji Kajio (梶尾 真治, Kajio Shinji; born 24 December 1947 in Kumamoto Prefecture) is a Japanese author of science fiction and fantasy. The film Yomigaeri is based on Kajio's novel of the same name and he also co-wrote the manga series Memories of Emanon (おもいでエマノン, Omoide Emanon) (2008) with Kenji Tsuruta (who additionally illustrated the series), which was serialized in Monthly Comic Ryu. The manga is based on his 1983 short story of the same title and became the beginning of his long-running series of "Emanon" short stories, about a mysterious girl born 3 billion years ago (and whose name is "No name" backwards). In 1971, he made his pro debut after his book, Pearls for Mia (美亜へ贈る真珠, Mia e Okuru Shinju) was published by Hayakawa Publishing Company (早川書房, Hayakawa Shoboo).

He won the 1991 Nihon SF Taisho Award.

== Works in English translation ==
- "Reiko's Universe Box" (Speculative Japan, Kurodahan Press, 2007)
- "Emanon: A Reminiscence" (Speculative Japan 2, Kurodahan Press, 2011)
- "Pearls for Mia" (Speculative Japan 4, Kurodahan Press, 2018)
- "The Husk Heir" (Vampiric: Tales of Blood and Roses from Japan, Kurodahan Press, 2019)
