= Emanon (manga) =

Japanese manga series

- Memories of Emanon
- Memories of Emanon volume cover

おもいでエマノン (Omoide Emanon)
- Genre: Science fiction
- Manga
- Written by: Shinji Kajio
- Illustrated by: Kenji Tsuruta
- Published by: Tokuma Shoten
- English publisher: NA: Dark Horse Comics
- Imprint: Ryu Comics Special
- Magazine: Monthly Comic Ryū
- Original run: 19 September 2006 – 19 December 2017
- Volumes: 4
- Series titles
- 1. Memories of Emanon (2006–2008; 1 volume); 2. Emanon Wanderer (2008–2017; 3 volumes)
- icon

Memories of Emanon (Japanese: おもいでエマノン, Hepburn: Omoide Emanon) is a Japanese manga series by Kenji Tsuruta, based on a 1983 novel written by Shinji Kajio. It was serialized in Tokuma Shoten's seinen manga magazine Monthly Comic Ryū from September 2006 to January 2008, with its chapters collected in a single wideban volume. Another series, Emanon Wanderer, was serialized in the same magazine from October 2008 to December 2017, with its chapters collected in three volumes. Both manga have been licensed for English release in North America by Dark Horse Comics, with Emanon serving as the overall series title.

== Premise ==
The series follows the travels of Emanon (エマノン) ("No Name" backwards), a mysterious young woman who possesses a three-billion-year-old memory, dating back to the creation of life. Emanon has been reborn countless times, retaining all the memories and experiences from all her past lives. She wanders around the world with no clear destination in mind, and will continue to do so again and again many times in the future.

== Publication ==
Based on a 1983 novel written by Shinji Kajio, and illustrated by Kenji Tsuruta, Memories of Emanon was serialized in Tokuma Shoten's seinen manga magazine Monthly Comic Ryū from 19 September 2006 to 19 January 2008. (Note: The series was published until the March issue of 2008, which went on sale on 19 January of the same year.) Tokuma Shoten collected its chapters in a single wideban volume released on 20 May 2008.

An adaptation of Kajio's 1992 novel, Emanon Wanderer (さすらいエマノン, Sasurai Emanon; lit. 'Wandering Emanon'), was serialized in Monthly Comic Ryū from 18 October 2008 to 19 December 2017. Tokuma Shoten collected its chapters in three volumes, released on 3 April 2012; 30 November 2013; and 26 April 2018.

The series was licensed in North America by Dark Horse Comics in 2018. They released Emanon: Memories of Emanon on 8 May 2019; the first and second volumes of Emanon: Emanon Wanderer were released on 14 August and 4 December of the same year, respectively; the third volume was released on 20 September 2023.

== Reception ==
Memories of Emanon was nominated for the Seiun Award in the Comic category in 2009. In 2019, at San Diego Comic-Con, the series was listed in the "Underrated but Awesome Manga" category by the annual "Best and Worst Manga" panel.

Writing for Otaku USA, Jason Thompson made a positive review of Memories of Emanon, recommending the volume and commenting: "Beautiful artwork, philosophical sci-fi discussions, and atmospheric wordless sequences make up this tale of life as ferryboat ride." Sean Gaffney of A Case Suitable For Treatment commended the volume as well, adding that it "works very well as a stand-alone [volume] and gets into some of the big questions of how memory works." Gaffney also praised the dialogues and Tsuruta's artwork, concluding: "If you're looking for something introspective and thought-provoking, this is a very good title to pick up." In a more negative review, Demelza of Anime UK News criticized the story and characters, calling them "bland" and with no personality. Demelza, however, commended the artwork, the flow of the panels, and the expressiveness of the characters, and concluded: "The artwork is the only saving grace and even then it's not enough to sell me on the idea of more."
