= Street Fighter II (manga) =

Manga series by Masaomi Kanzaki

- Street Fighter II: Ryu
- Cover of Street Fighter II RYU (Street Fighter II in English) Vol. 1 (original Japanese edition)

RYU (Sutorîto Faitā Tsū Ryū)
- Genre: Action, Martial arts
- Manga
- Written by: Masaomi Kanzaki
- Published by: Tokuma Shoten
- English publisher: NA: Tokuma Shoten (1994) UDON Entertainment (2008)
- Magazine: Family Computer Magazine
- Original run: 1993 – 1994
- Volumes: 3

Street Fighter II: Ryu (ストリートファイターII RYU), simply titled Street Fighter II in its English editions, is a manga series written and drawn by Masaomi Kanzaki that was serialized in the monthly Family Computer Magazine in 1993 and 1994. It is based on the fighting game of the same name and its subsequent iterations. The manga was produced prior to the release of Super Street Fighter II and only features the original twelve "World Warriors".

While far from being the only Street Fighter manga, it was one of the earliest and the first of few that were translated in English. It is notable for featuring the first illustrated appearance of Ryu and Ken's sensei, Gouken.

== Plot summary ==
Ryu and Ken have begun training with the reluctant and mysterious legend Gouken. One night, Ken's friend Cho appears at the dojo in a panic, revealing that he has learned of M. Bison's organization, Shadaloo, and its current agenda—vicious human experiments revolving around a drug called Doll, which effectively brainwashes people, usually for acts of violence. Cho has been followed and falls victim to an attack by Bison and two of his lords of Shadaloo, Vega and Sagat. Naturally, a fight ensues, during which the groups of combatants become separated. After making his way back to the dojo, Ryu finds that Gouken has been left for dead by Bison, and hears his master's final words. Assuming the missing Ken to be dead also, Ryu becomes a lonesome vagabond.

Years later, Doll has had an effect on the lives of a soldier named Guile and an Interpol officer named Chun-Li who have arrived on Shad and entered its martial-arts tournament in respective efforts to investigate Shadaloo and reach Bison, who has become the tournament's champion. Ryu, now a more capable fighter, has also emerged on Shad and entered the tournament, while befriending Cho's old girlfriend Po-Lin and her little brother Wong-Mei, who have been recently orphaned and manage their family's Chinese restaurant.

As the fighting progresses over the course of a few days, Ryu, Guile, and Chun-Li advance, facing opponents such as Blanka, E. Honda, Dhalsim, and Zangief some of whom have personal goals of their own. Ryu and Chun-Li form a loose affinity, and following a moment in which Chun-Li suddenly comes across Po-Lin with Ryu and appears jealous, Ryu sees a picture in the paper of an upcoming participant in the tournament, and from there realizes that Ken is indeed alive. At the tournament, Chun-Li and Guile begin losing to Vega and Sagat, with Guile still not fully recovered from his match with Zangief and Chun-Li partly hindered by rage. During the battles, an emotionally conflicted Ken starts to snap out of Doll's influence. Eventually, a weary Chun-Li begins to recall the advice she's received from her father and Ryu, respectively; regains control of herself; and surprises Vega with a powerful Kikoken a moment before he can land the finishing strike.

Guile, meanwhile, is still faring poorly against Sagat, before being saved by intervention from none other than Ken, who's regained his senses. While the new fight plays out, Guile and Chun-Li lie nearly unconscious in the backroom infirmary, only to be approached by a henchman of Bison's sent to finish them off. But before he can complete his attack, he is blasted into a wall and knocked senseless by a Hadouken, and a still-weary Chun-Li reaches out upon looking up and noticing that Ryu has arrived.

After overcoming Sagat, Ken is set to fight in the next day's final match but soon confronts Bison backstage in a hallway, seeking to take his anger out on him immediately. He is stopped, however, by Ryu, whom Ken is relieved to find alive. However, Bison uses his power to control Ken via Doll again and orders him to fight Ryu. The fight stops when Ryu ceases fighting and tells Ken to resist Doll's and Bison's orders. Ken has a flashback of his years under Gouken with Ryu and snaps out of it in the middle of a Shoryuuken. He manages to turn the attack away from Ryu and smashes his hand into a wall. With his hand broken, Ken asks Ryu to take his place in the tournament's finale against Bison.

Ryu agrees, and after an emotional battle witnessed by many, including notable Street Fighters and several of the people who have been affected by Shadaloo over the years, Ryu emerges victorious. As it ends, a jump forward at some point in the future reveals that many of the friends and participants have parted ways or begun doing so. A narrative by Chun-Li implies that both Doll's time and Shadaloo's control over Shad have passed. Ryu departs once more, leaving Ken, Po-Lin, and Wong-Mei as he sets off on a journey.

== Editions ==
=== Japanese ===
The Street Fighter II manga was originally collected in three tankōbon editions in Japan published by Tokuman Shoten, following its serialization in Family Computer Magazine. It was later published in one complete edition in 2004, bundled with the 23-minute animated film Street Fighter II: Return To The Fujiwara Capital.

- Volume 1 (ISBN 419793050X)
- Volume 2 (ISBN 4197930704)
- Volume 3 (ISBN 4197900074)
- Complete Edition (ISBN 4906582028)

=== English ===
Tokuma Comics (a now-defunct U.S. imprint of Tokuma Shoten) published the chapters from the first two tankōbon as an eight-issue monthly comic in 1994, featuring amplified paper size to reflect the style of a comic book, colorized artwork, and re-arranged panels (as opposed to mirroring the artwork, which was the standard practice of translating manga at the time) so that the comic could be read in the western left-to-right format. In some cases, the dialogue was changed to be read from left to right, while other times it was kept in its original right-to-left order.

Udon has published a revised adaptation of the complete manga, featuring the original uncensored black and white artwork and right-to-left orientation, as a three-volume set.

- Volume 1 (ISBN 0978138619)
- Volume 2 (ISBN 0978138627)
- Volume 3 (ISBN 0978138635)

== See also ==
- Street Fighter II: The Animated Movie
- Street Fighter II V
- Street Fighter Alpha: The Animation
- Street Fighter Alpha: Generations
- Street Fighter (TV series)
