= List of Sola episodes =

Sola limited edition DVD volume 1 cover featuring Matsuri Shihou.

This is a list of episodes of the Japanese anime Sola. The episodes are directed by Tomoki Kobayashi and produced by the Japanese animation studio Nomad. The anime is based on the mixed media project of the same name originally conceived by Naoki Hisaya (main writer of Kanon) with original character design by Naru Nanao (designer of D.C.: Da Capo). The story follows the life of a male high school student named Yorito Morimiya who meets a strange non-human girl named Matsuri Shihō and gets entangled in a fight between her and a man named Takeshi Tsujido who is trying to kill her. The anime aired between April 7, 2007, and June 30, 2007, containing thirteen episodes. Two additional episodes were made available exclusively on DVD volumes four and five as original video animations; the first was released on September 25, 2007, and the second was on October 26, 2007.

== Episodes ==
=== Anime television series (2007) ===
No.	Title	Original release date
1	"The Sky-Colored Umbrella"; Transliteration: "Sorairo no Kasa" (Japanese: ソライロノカサ)	April 7, 2007
Yorito Morimiya is a young boy who loves taking pictures of the sky, and one day in the early morning while setting up to take a snapshot of the sunrise, he meets a strange girl. After talking with her for a few minutes, she disappears and is nowhere to be found. The next day, Yorito is coming back from buying some groceries on a rainy night and runs into the same girl; this time he finds out her name to be Matsuri Shihō. Later on, Yorito figures out Matsuri lives in a church and goes to find her. At the same time, Matsuri is being hunted by a mysterious man.
2	"Looking Up at the Blue"; Transliteration: "Miageru Ao" (Japanese: ミアゲルアオ)	April 14, 2007
After the fight with Takeshi, Matsuri gets injured and Yorito tries to protect her by bringing her back to his home. After she wakes up, she tries to thank him by making him a meal, but due to her limited knowledge of the modern world, it does not work out. That night, Matsuri intended to leave Yorito's house without him knowing, but stayed to look at the sky painted on the ceiling of Yorito's room.
3	"Peaceful Day"; Transliteration: "Odayaka na Hi" (Japanese: オダヤカナヒ)	April 21, 2007
It has been a week since Matsuri started living with Yorito and he has become visibly suspicious to Mana who wants to find out what he is hiding. Mana comes over one night and tells him that she wants to make him dinner, though after he leaves to buy some seasonings, Mana tries to search the house. While initially unsuccessful, Mana runs into Matsuri eating in the kitchen and they become acquainted.
4	"Two People's Wish"; Transliteration: "Negai Futari" (Japanese: ネガイフタリ)	April 28, 2007
This episode mainly focuses on the friendship between Yorito's sister Aono and Mana's little sister Koyori, both of whom are staying at the hospital. Koyori, who is to be released soon, has trouble conferring this news to Aono. The relationship between Yorito and his sister is also explored, as more information about the dolls he brings her is revealed.
5	"Raining Light"; Transliteration: "Furisosogu Hikari" (Japanese: フリソソグヒカリ)	May 5, 2007
On a rainy, cloudy day, Matsuri and Yorito go outside and take a boat around the lake. Later on, Matsuri is ambushed by Takeshi in Yorito's home. Overpowered, she is about to give up as she notices the sky-painted ceiling in Yorito's room. This gives her the determination to fight back and flee the house, but only Yorito's eventual intervention prevents Takeshi from killing her.
6	"Blood of a Sacrifice"; Transliteration: "Ikenie no Chi" (Japanese: イケニエノチ)	May 12, 2007
Yorito finally decides to introduce Matsuri to Aono under the guise of her being his new girlfriend, but when they go to visit Aono, the latter feigns sleep. Later on, Aono meets with Matsuri in a tram depot where it is revealed that Aono is also a Yaka and her powers are now returning. Aono comes home with Matsuri and Aono tells Yorito that she has permission from the hospital to stay at home for now. After dinner, Matsuri and Yorito go to Yorito's school. At the roof of his school, Matsuri explains the loneliness of Yaka to Yorito. After that, Matsuri kisses Yorito and disappears.
7	"Gray Night"; Transliteration: "Haiiro no Yoru" (Japanese: ハイイロノヨル)	May 19, 2007
Yorito and Mana search for Matsuri after she disappears on the night she kissed Yorito. Almost a month passes from Matsuri's disappearance, and Yorito has almost given up hope on her return. On a date out with Aono, Yorito accidentally runs into Matsuri again inside a convenience store and gives chase, leaving Aono alone. Yorito catches up to her to find out she has been living with Mayuko in an abandoned building. Aono is left wandering in the rain alone and is angered by Yorito's desire to be with Matsuri. Back in the abandoned building, Matsuri collapses after being stabbed by a piece of glass by a seemingly mentally vacant/unconscious Yorito who seems to be controlled by Aono.
8	"Unfading Feelings"; Transliteration: "Kienai Omoi" (Japanese: キエナイオモイ)	May 26, 2007
Yorito wakes up one day in school believing that the night's previous events with Matsuri was a dream due to Aono intervening with her powers. Trying to remember what really happened, Yorito collapses in school and is taken home by Mana who is soon after told to leave by Aono. Yorito is kept in his room by Aono as she controls Yorito more with her powers in order to fulfill her desire to be with Yorito together.
9	"End of a Promise"; Transliteration: "Yakusoku no Hate" (Japanese: ヤクソクノハテ)	June 2, 2007
Aono has come to kill Matsuri in an abandoned part of town and a one-sided battle ensues with Aono attacking while Matsuri runs for her life. In the end, Aono cannot bring herself to kill Matsuri and leaves afterwards. After suffering another mental attack, Yorito is brought to Mana's place to keep him safe from Aono who later comes looking for him; Mana manages to get her to leave. Later, Matsuri runs into Takeshi again who once again tries to kill Matsuri and nearly succeeds, but Mayuko intervenes in the end and saves her life.
10	"Flickering Illusion"; Transliteration: "Yureru Maboroshi" (Japanese: ユレルマボロシ)	June 9, 2007
Mana finally tells Yorito that Aono is a Yaka, but he initially does not believe her. He later confirms this after confronting his "sister" about what she is hiding from him, but Aono would not tell him. Yorito and Matsuri meet in the abandoned building where Yorito stabbed Matsuri in episode seven. Yorito asks her why he would have memories of hundreds of years ago, and Matsuri stabs him with Takeshi's sword to show him the truth. It is revealed that Yorito is not Aono's true brother but merely a paper puppet she had created to fill the deep hole of loneliness in her heart when her true brother died many years ago. Made so they have the same appearance and name, Aono was desperate to find a place where she and her brother can live without disturbances, so she controlled and altered his memories.
11	"Pictures of a Reverie"; Transliteration: "Musō Renga" (Japanese: ムソウレンガ)	June 16, 2007
Yorito and Aono are planning on leaving so that things will go back to the way they were. Mana tries to get Yorito to tell her who he really is, but he does not say. Later, Mana is out with her friends and she brings up Yorito in conversation, but discovers that everyone else but her has already forgotten about him. Scared of what this means, Mana runs to the school roof and finds Yorito alone and remembers what he said earlier, 'everything will become clear after the sunset'. After sunset, however, Mana finds herself alone on the school roof crying heavingly, not knowing why. Her memories of Yorito are erased just like with the others. Takeshi and Mayuko leave town near the end, and Matsuri goes to Aono's house with Takeshi's sword in hand.
12	"The Boundary Between Light and Dark"; Transliteration: "Yūmei no Sakai" (Japanese: ユウメイノサカイ)	June 23, 2007
Matsuri has come to Aono's house and go into a conversation about who Yorito chooses to go with — Aono to a different place, or Matsuri, whom he has asked a favor from. The two Yaka begin a battle in the wrecked construction area while Yorito waits in an old theatre. Just when Matsuri is able to deliver the final blow to Yorito and Aono, the old camera in the theatre comes on and displays the sky. Matsuri has a flashback and from what Takeshi said, drives the sword into her own self, much to the dismay and horror of the siblings.
13	"Sky"; Transliteration: "Sora" (Japanese: ソラ)	June 30, 2007
Matsuri tries to forcefully stab Aono with her sword, but Aono moves out of the way in time; she still manages to get a wound on her shoulder. While Aono runs away, Yorito is left with an arm missing and he slowly becomes weaker since Aono is losing her Yaka powers. Matsuri tells Yorito to not intervene and goes after Aono. During the fight, Matsuri loses her sword, and Aono takes it up to shove it into Matsuri, but Yorito, not listening to Matsuri's heeding words, intervenes and he is impaled on the sword. Yorito then disappears in a flurry of paper followed by Aono's shrill cries. Matsuri does not hesitate this time to stab Aono. As the sun rises, Matsuri smiles to herself, as she can finally see the beautiful azure sky she had always wanted to see. Happy and contented she passes away and disappears. With Yorito and Matsuri both dead, Aono is devastated, but she is now human. One year later Aono comes back, and no one but she herself remembers who she is, or any of the incidents that happened. Aono become friends with Mana and Koyori and at the same time forgives Matsuri for everything. In the very last scene, the three of them go to the usual spot to take a photo of the sunrise. Koyori tries to get a drink out of a vending machine but it seems to be stuck, where Aono uses the effective kick from Matsuri, and the machine delivers the can. Aono then notices the wooden pavilion, where there are two empty cans of tomato and bean broth next to each other.

=== OVAs (2007) ===
No.	Title	Original release date
14	"A Different Route"; Transliteration: "Betsu Rūto" (Japanese: ベツルート)	September 25, 2007
Chronologically, this episode occurs between episodes four and five of the television broadcast. Koyori wins tickets to a family-oriented spa and water park that just recently opened; Yorito, Koyori, Mana and her friends go together, though Aono has to stay in the hospital. Coincidentally, Takeshi also wins tickets to the spa, and takes Mayuko with him. At the park, Takeshi and Yorito meet, and Takeshi initially chases Yorito since he thinks Matsuri is at the park too, but she also could not go because of her condition of a Yaka. After realizing Matsuri is not at the park, Takeshi calms down, and Yorito meets Mayuko; the rest of Yorito's friends also meet them. After the sun goes down, Matsuri comes to the park, and Takeshi and Mayuko have already left. (The OVA glosses past that Mayuko is also a yaka, and even shows all the girls in a mineral pool, with a window behind them with sunset colors.)
15	"Towards the Dawning Sky"; Transliteration: "Akeru Sora e" (Japanese: アケルソラへ)	October 26, 2007
This episode serves as a prologue to the series and leads up to the events at the beginning of episode one. Mana is getting frustrated at Yorito for going to take pictures of the sky when he is supposed to be visiting his sister Aono in the hospital. The day before Aono's birthday, Mana has to practically drag Yorito around to order a cake, and the two go and visit Aono in the hospital later. While there, Yorito decides to bring Aono some photos of the sky the next time he visits, though Aono wants a photo of the sunrise. Yorito goes home to print out photos of the sunrise, but thinks something is wrong with them and goes out to take a new photo. While out, he meets Matsuri for the first time.
