= Masaomi Kanzaki =

Japanese manga artist

- Occupation: Manga artist
- Known for: Street Fighter II manga

Masaomi Kanzaki (神崎 将臣, Kanzaki Masaomi) is a Japanese manga artist. He has worked on titles such as Flag Fighters, Ironcat, Hagane, and Xenon. He is best known worldwide for his work on the Street Fighter II manga in the early 1990s.
