= List of Love, Chunibyo & Other Delusions episodes =

Japanese cover art of the Blu-ray and DVD compilation featuring Rikka Takanashi.

Love, Chunibyo & Other Delusions is a Japanese anime television series based on Torako's light novel series of the same name and produced by Kyoto Animation. It follows a group of students with signs of chūnibyō syndrome running a club.

The first season of the series aired in Japan from October 4 to December 19, 2012. A short series of original net animation, Love, Chunibyo & Other Delusions Lite, were streamed on YouTube from September 27 to November 1, 2012. Pony Canyon released the series on six Blu-ray and DVD compilation volumes between December 19, 2012, and May 15, 2013. The volumes contained bonus shorts titled Depth of Field: Love and Hate Theater. A seventh volume with the original video animation episode and the Lite shorts, were released on June 19, 2013. Sentai Filmworks licensed the series. It was streamed on the Anime Network. The opening theme is "Sparkling Daydream" by Zaq, and the ending theme is "Inside Identity" by Black Raison d'être. The series has three insert songs, including "Hajimari no Tane" (始まりの種; The Seed of Start) and "Kimi no Tonari ni" (君のとなりに; Next to You) by Zaq, and "Miagete Goran Yoru no Hoshi o" (見上げてごらん夜の星を; Look Up at the Stars in the Night) by Maaya Uchida. The single for "Sparkling Daydream" was released on October 24, 2012, and "Inside Identity" on November 21, 2012. For the Lite episodes, the opening theme "Kimi e" (君へ; To You) and the ending theme "Shikkoku ni Odoru Haōbushi" (漆黒に躍る弧濁覇王節; The Melody of Conqueror Dancing in Jet Black), are sung by Zaq. An animated film with a retelling story premiered on September 14, 2013.

The second season of the series, Love, Chunibyo & Other Delusions: Heart Throb, aired from January 8 to March 26, 2014. It was simulcast by Crunchyroll. The first episode for the second set of Lite episodes was released on December 26, 2013. The second series of shorts, Heated Table Series: Kotatsu, were released on Blu-ray and DVD on March 19, 2014. The opening theme is "Voice" by Zaq and the ending theme is "Van!shment Th!s World" by Black Raison d'être. The ending theme for the Lite episodes is "Shin'en ni Mau Senritsu Shanikusai" (深淵に舞う戦慄謝肉祭, A Hair-Raising Carnival Dancing in the Abyss) by Zaq. Sentai Filmworks licensed the series in August 2015. After Sony acquired Crunchyroll, the series was removed from the service on March 31, 2022.

== Series overview ==
Season	Episodes	Originally released	
Season	Episodes	First released	Last released
1	12	4 October 2012	20 December 2012
2	12	8 January 2014	26 March 2014

== Episodes ==
=== Love, Chunibyo & Other Delusions ===
Story	Episode	Title	Original release date
1	1	"Chance Encounter... with Wicked Lord Shingan"; Transliteration: "Kaikō no... Jaō Shingan" (Japanese: 邂逅の…邪王真眼)	October 4, 2012
2	2	"Priestess... of the Melody"; Transliteration: "Senritsu no... Purīsutesu" (Japanese: 旋律の…聖調理人（プリーステス）)	October 11, 2012
3	3	"The Heretical… Pigtailed Girl"; Transliteration: "Itan Naru... Tsuintēru" (Japanese: 異端なる…双尾娘（ツインテール）)	October 18, 2012
4	4	"Regret of... the Mabinogion"; Transliteration: "Tsūkon no... Mabinogion" (Japanese: 痛恨の…闇聖典（マビノギオン）)	October 25, 2012
5	5	"A Binding... Hard Study"; Transliteration: "Sokubaku no... Hādo Sutadi" (Japanese: 束縛の…十字架（ハード・スタディ）)	November 1, 2012
6	6	"The Atoned... Innocent"; Transliteration: "Shokuzai no... Inosento" (Japanese: 贖罪の…救世主(イノセント))	November 8, 2012
7	7	"Reminiscences... of Paradise Lost"; Transliteration: "Tsuioku no... Paradaisu Rosuto" (Japanese: 追憶の…楽園喪失(パラダイス・ロスト))	November 15, 2012
8	8	"Exiled... Just the Two of Them"; Transliteration: "Futari dake no... Eguzairu" (Japanese: 二人だけの…逃避行(エグザイル))	November 22, 2012
9	9	"A Confused... Chaos Heart"; Transliteration: "Konton no... Kaosu Hāto" (Japanese: 混沌の…初恋煩(カオス・ハート))	November 29, 2012
10	10	"Holy Mother's... Pandora's Box"; Transliteration: "Seibo no... Pandorazu Bokkusu" (Japanese: 聖母の…弁当箱（パンドラズ・ボックス）)	December 6, 2012
11	11	"One-Winged Fallen Angel"; Transliteration: "Katayoku no Fōrin Enjeru" (Japanese: 片翼の堕天使（フォーリン·エンジェル）)	December 13, 2012
12	12	"Eternal Engage"; Transliteration: "Shūten no Etānaru Engēji" (Japanese: 終天の契約（エターナル·エンゲージ）)	December 20, 2012
13 (OVA)	13	"Glimmering... Explosive Festival (Slapstick Noël)"; Transliteration: "Kirameki no... Surappusutikku Noeru" (Japanese: 煌めきの… 聖爆誕祭（スラップスティック・ノエル）)	June 19, 2013 (BD/DVD); December 25, 2013 (TV)

Story	Episode	Title	Original release date
1	1	"Volleyball"; Transliteration: "Barēbōru" (Japanese: バレーボール)	September 27, 2012
2	2	"Wicked Eye: Daybreak Chapter"; Transliteration: "Jaō Shingan Reimeihen" (Japanese: 邪王真眼・黎明篇)	October 4, 2012
3	3	"My Older Brother"; Transliteration: "Watashi no Onii-chan" (Japanese: わたしのお兄ちゃん)	October 11, 2012
4	4	"We'll Make Meat and Potato Stew!"; Transliteration: "Niku-jaga Tsukuru yo!" (Japanese: 肉じゃが作るよ！)	October 18, 2012
5	5	"The Sleeping After School Beauty"; Transliteration: "Nemureru Hōkago no Bishōjo" (Japanese: 眠れる放課後の美少女)	October 25, 2012
6	6	"Dekomori vs. Nibutani"; Transliteration: "Dekomori VS Nibutani" (Japanese: 凸守 VS 丹生谷)	November 1, 2012

Story	Episode	Title	Original release date
1	1	"Depth of Field: Love and Hate Theater Phase 1"	December 19, 2012
2	2	"Depth of Field: Love and Hate Theater Phase 2"	January 16, 2013
3	3	"Depth of Field: Love and Hate Theater Phase 3"	February 20, 2013
4	4	"Depth of Field: Love and Hate Theater Phase 4"	March 20, 2013
5	5	"Depth of Field: Love and Hate Theater Phase 5"	April 17, 2013
6	6	"Depth of Field: Love and Hate Theater Last Phase"	May 15, 2013
7	7	"Depth of Field: Love and Hate Theater Extra Phase"	June 19, 2013

Episode	Title	Original release date
Film	"Love, Chunibyo & Other Delusions the Movie: Rikka Takanashi Revision"; Transliteration: "Takanashi Rikka Kai: Gekijō-ban Chūnibyō Demo Koi ga Shitai!" (Japanese: 小鳥遊六花・改 ～劇場版 中二病でも恋がしたい!～)	September 14, 2013 (theater); February 19, 2014 (BD/DVD)
Lite	"My Older Brother 2"; Transliteration: "Watashi no Onii-chan 2" (Japanese: わたしのお兄ちゃん2)	September 14, 2013 (theater); February 19, 2014 (BD/DVD)

=== Love, Chunibyo & Other Delusions: Heart Throb ===
Story	Episode	Title	Original release date
1	1	"Evil Lord Shingan... Reborn"; Transliteration: "Fukkatsu no... Jaō Shingan" (Japanese: 復活の・・・邪王真眼)	January 8, 2014
2	2	"Dolphin Ring Striker"; Transliteration: "Iruka no... Dorufin Ringu Sutoraikā" (Japanese: 海豚の・・・恋人契約 (ドルフィンリング・ストライカー))	January 15, 2014
3	3	"Magical Devil Girl In Pursuit"; Transliteration: "Tsuigeki no… Maō Mahō Shōjo" (Japanese: 追撃の…魔王魔法少女)	January 22, 2014
4	4	"The Election for President of the Student Council (Queen Maker)... of Purity"; Transliteration: "Mukunaru... Kuīn Mēkā" (Japanese: 無垢なる・・・ 生徒会長選挙 (クイーンメーカー))	January 29, 2014
5	5	"The Illusive... Siesta Labyrinth"; Transliteration: "Gensō no… Shiesuta Rabirinsu" (Japanese: 幻想の…昼寝迷宮(シエスタ・ラビリンス))	February 5, 2014
6	6	"Travelling to the Island of Tsukushi... of Hesitation"; Transliteration: "Tamerai no... Tsukushino-shima Toraberingu" (Japanese: 躊躇（ためら）いの…筑紫島周遊（ツクシノシマ・トラベリング）)	February 12, 2014
7	7	"Triangle... of Missed Encounters"; Transliteration: "Surechigai no... Vorukēno Toraianguru" (Japanese: すれ違いの…心模様(ヴォルケーノ・トライアングル))	February 19, 2014
8	8	"The False... Mori Summer [or Holy Spirit Mother]"; Transliteration: "Itsuwari no… Mori Samā" (Japanese: 偽りの…精霊聖母(モリサマー))	February 26, 2014
9	9	"Resort - Last Resort"; Transliteration: "Namiuchigiwa no... Rizōto Rasuto Rizōto" (Japanese: 波打際の...究極奥義(リゾート・ラストリゾート))	March 5, 2014
10	10	"Gauntlet of Rain [or] a Midsummer Night's... Rain and Whips"; Transliteration: "Manatsu no Yoru no... Gauntlet of rain" (Japanese: 真夏の夜の・・・雨と鞭 (Gauntlet of rain))	March 12, 2014
11	11	"Blue Moon Ragnarok"; Transliteration: "Aokitsuki no... Burūmūn Ragunaroku" (Japanese: 青き月の・・・最終決戦 (ブルームーン・ラグナロク))	March 19, 2014
12	12	"The Superior Contract... of Twilight"; Transliteration: "Koukun no... Haiyā Engēji" (Japanese: 黄昏の・・・ 上級契約(ハイヤーエンゲージ))	March 26, 2014
13	13 (OVA)	"Playback of... the Wicked Eye's Apocalypse (The Rikka Wars)"; Transliteration: "Saisei no… The Rikka Wars" (Japanese: 再生の…邪王真眼黙示録（The Rikka Wars）)	September 17, 2014

Episode	Title	Original release date
1	"Kotatsu Head"; Transliteration: "Kotatsumuri" (Japanese: こたつむり)	December 26, 2013
2	"Stye, The Name of the Disease Which Infects the Eye"; Transliteration: "Monomorai, Mebachiko Arui wa Meibo to Iu Na no Yamai" (Japanese: ものもらい、めばちこ或いはめいぼと言う名の病)	January 15, 2014
3	"Wicked Eye: Storm Chapter"; Transliteration: "Jaō Shingan Fūun-hen" (Japanese: 邪王真眼風雲編)	January 30, 2014
4	"Dekomori vs. Nibutani 2"; Transliteration: "Dekomori VS Nibutani 2" (Japanese: 凸守 VS 丹生谷 2)	February 13, 2014
5	"My Older Brother 3: Camping Chapter"; Transliteration: "Watashi no Onii-chan 3: Kyanpu-hen" (Japanese: 私のお兄ちゃん3 キャンプ編)	February 27, 2014
6	"Summoning an Archangel"; Transliteration: "Daitenshi Shōkan" (Japanese: 大天使召喚)	March 13, 2014

Episode	Title	Original release date
1	"Heated Table Series: Shiritori"; Transliteration: "Kotatsu de Shiritori" (Japanese: こたつ DE しりとり)	March 19, 2014
2	"Heated Table Series: Bun Discussion"; Transliteration: "Kotatsu de Odango Dangi" (Japanese: こたつ DE ODANGO DANGI)	April 16, 2014
3	"Heated Table Series: Dekomori's Wife"; Transliteration: "Kotatsu de Dekomori no Yome" (Japanese: こたつ DE 凸守の嫁)	May 21, 2014
4	"Heated Table Series: Nabe Lecture"; Transliteration: "Kotatsu de Nabe Dangi" (Japanese: こたつ DE NABE DANGI)	June 18, 2014
5	"All Times All Places on the Beach"; Transliteration: "Hamabe de Kokon Tōzai" (Japanese: 浜辺 DE 古今東西)	July 16, 2014
6	"Heated Table Series: A Wandering Chimera"; Transliteration: "Hōsō de Kimera" (Japanese: 放浪 DE きめら)	August 20, 2014
7	"Supplementary Lessons in the Clubroom"; Transliteration: "Bushitsu de Hoshū" (Japanese: 部室 DE 補習)	September 17, 2014
