= Kenji Tsuruta =

Japanese manga artist

Kenji Tsuruta (鶴田 謙二, Tsuruta Kenji; born May 9, 1961 in Hamamatsu, Shizuoka Prefecture) is a Japanese manga artist. Among his most famous works is the science fiction series Spirit of Wonder, which has been adapted into an anime series and brought him much acclaim.

== Profile ==
During his formative years in university as a student of optical science, Tsuruta, who had initially wanted to be a photographer, had been inspired by the works of numerous science fiction authors, such as Robert A. Heinlein, and manga artists, such as Yukinobu Hoshino and his manga Sabertooth Tiger, which had inspired him to create manga. He has also cited Tetsuya Chiba and his manga among his inspirations.

Soon after graduating, he wrote numerous doujinshi and was an assistant to numerous manga artists, prior to making his debut as a professional manga artist. In 1986, Tsuruta made his professional debut, authoring his first manga series, the short work, Hiroku te suteki na uchū ja nai ka (広くてすてきな宇宙じゃないか; a.k.a. What a Big Wonderful Universe It Is), which was serialized in Kodansha's Weekly Morning magazine, set in a world where the land was sinking into water. Tsuruta has cited that the inspiration to this debut work of his came during a train journey from Tokyo to the ocean at Odawara, during which he had seen numerous rice paddies and thought of the possibility of a train line passing through the ocean, after which he wanted to create a work where he could use this image.

Soon after, Tsuruta authored Spirit of Wonder, among his most famous works, in which he applied many of his inspirations, which was serialized in Kodansha's seinen magazines Weekly Morning and Monthly Afternoon between 1986 and 1994, and was later adapted into an anime series.

After Spirit of Wonder, Tsuruta wrote short manga works, and also illustrated numerous art books, which were quite successful. In 2002, he provided the character designs for the anime series Abenobashi Mahō Shōtengai and also illustrated its manga adaptation.

In 2000 and 2001, Tsuruta received the 31st and 32nd Seiun Awards for outstanding artist of the year. He has also received the Hayakawa Award for best illustrator, in 2000.

== Works ==
=== Tankōbon ===
- Spirit of Wonder (serialized in Morning and Monthly Afternoon, 1986–1994)
- SF Meibutsū – Shoki Sakuhinshū (SF名物-初期作品集)
- Magical Shopping Arcade Abenobashi (character designs, illustrator of manga)
- Forget-me-not
- Nippon Furusato Chinbotsu (日本ふるさと沈没; anthology)
- Memories of Emanon (おもいでエマノン, Omoide Emanon); original story: Shinji Kajio
  - Wandering Emanon (さすらいエマノン, Sasurai Emanon); original story: Shinji Kajio
- Wandering Island; licensed by Dark Horse Comics (冒険エレキテ島, Bōken Erekitetou)
- La Pomme Prisonnière (ポム・プリゾニエール, 2014)
- Captain Momo's Secret Base; licensed by Dark Horse Comics (モモ艦長の秘密基地, Momo Kanchō no Himitsu Kichi), 2017

=== Artbooks ===
- suiso – hydrogen (水素-hydrogen)
- Eternal
- Hitahita (ひたひた)
- Comet (コメット, Kometto)
- Tsuruta Kenji Kyōyō Gashū: Made in China (鶴田謙二教養画集 MADE IN CHINA; CD-ROM artbook)

=== Other works ===
- The Sky Crawlers (illustrations)
