= List of Steins;Gate 0 episodes =

Steins;Gate 0 Blu-ray volume 1 cover, featuring Rintaro Okabe and Mayuri Shiina

Steins;Gate 0 (Japanese: シュタインズ・ゲート ゼロ, Hepburn: Shutainzu Gēto Zero) is a 2018 television anime series by White Fox, based on the 5pb. 2015 Steins;Gate 0 video game. As a sequel to the Steins;Gate visual novel game, and the 2011 anime adaptation, this series takes place in an alternate future timeline that forks off from the original series' ending. Rintaro Okabe, who had become traumatized into inaction over his time travel troubles, chose to remain in a world where Kurisu Makise is dead. After meeting scientist Maho Hiyajo, Rintaro is introduced to an AI system called Amadeus, which is based on Kurisu's personality and digitally preserved memories that were downloaded before her death.

The series aired in Japan between April 12 and September 27, 2018, with a bonus episode released on December 21, 2018. It was simulcast by Crunchyroll and Aniplus Asia, with a dubbed English version streamed by Funimation. The opening theme is "Fatima" (ファティマ) by Kanako Itō, with "Amadeus" by Itō used for episode one. The ending theme for episodes 2–7, 9-11 and 13 is "Last Game" by Zwei. Episode 8 featured an insert song "Lyra" by Zwei. The ending theme for episode 12 is "Hoshi no Kanaderu Uta" (transl. Song sung by stars) performed by Megumi Han. The ending theme from episode 14-22 is "World-Line" by Asami Imai. The final episode featured an insert song "Gate of Steiner" by Eri Sasaki.

== Episodes ==
No.	Title (Note: All English episode titles taken from Crunchyroll.)	Original air date
1	"Missing Link of the Annihilator: Absolute Zero"; Transliteration: "Rei-ka-iki no Misshingu Rinku" (Japanese: 零化域のミッシングリンク Absolute Zero)	April 12, 2018 (Note: The series is billed as premiering on April 11, 2018 at "25:35", effectively April 12.)
Six months have passed since Rintaro Okabe, unable to change the past, chose to stay in a world line where Kurisu Makise is dead, discarding his identity as a self-proclaimed mad scientist. Suzuha Amane, the future daughter of Itaru "Daru" Hashida who had traveled back in time to convince Rintaro to help her prevent World War III, pretended to be Daru's sister to keep her identity a secret from her future mother, Yuki Amane. As Rintaro, still traumatized over his experiences with changing world lines, continues to refuse to help Suzuha, he attends a seminar held by Professor Alexis Leskinen and his assistant Maho Hiyajo. During the seminar, Leskinen and Maho present Amadeus, an artificial intelligence program based on Kurisu's research before her death.
2	"Epigraph of the Closed Curve: Closed Epigraph"; Transliteration: "Heijikyokusen no Epigurafu" (Japanese: 閉時曲線のエピグラフ Closed Epigraph)	April 19, 2018
While waiting for Amadeus to load, Rintaro lashes out at a naysayer in the crowd doubting Kurisu's research, earning praise from Leskinen. Maho then presents Amadeus, which runs an AI version of herself that was implanted with her memories four days ago, demonstrating that it is capable of its own decisions and behaves just like a human. Following the seminar, Rintaro speaks with Maho about the project, revealing that he was Kurisu's friend. Hearing about this, Leskinen and Maho invite Rintaro to converse with an Amadeus AI formed from Kurisu's memories of eight months ago before her death. Coming to Maho's lab, Rintaro is greeted by the Amadeus version of Kurisu, and he is surprised to find that her thoughts on time travel differs from what the original Kurisu told him. Afterwards, Leskinen and Maho recruit Rintaro as a temporary tester, installing an app on his phone that allows him to converse with Amadeus Kurisu.
3	"Protocol of the Two-sided Gospel: X-Day Protocol"; Transliteration: "Sōtsui Fukuin no Purotokoru" (Japanese: 双対福音のプロトコル X-Day Protocol)	April 26, 2018
As Mayuri Shiina prepares for a Christmas party for everyone at the lab, Rintaro shows Amadeus Kurisu – whom he keeps a secret from his friends – around Akihabara and the lab. On Christmas Eve, Leskinen and Maho end up joining Rintaro at the party, which proves to be more than a surprise when Suzuha assumes it is an ambush and almost attacks Yuki. While everyone else enjoys the party, Mayuri overhears Rintaro speaking happily with Amadeus Kurisu, prompting Maho to step in to remind him that the real Kurisu is still dead, at which point Rintaro feels strange sensations of déjà vu.
4	"Solitude of the Mournful Flow: A Stray Sheep"; Transliteration: "Bōshitsu Ruten no Sorichūdo" (Japanese: 亡失流転のソリチュード A Stray Sheep)	May 3, 2018
Rintaro briefly has a vision of a world line where he is caught up in the middle of a war, which he eventually comes to realize was his Reading Steiner taking effect. Meanwhile, Suzuha explains to Daru that she is looking for Kagari Shiina, Mayuri's future adopted daughter who time-traveled with her from the year 2036, but became separated from her in 1998. As Rintaro decides to help with the search, he gets a call from Luka Urashibara about a pressing matter, before finding that Daru has called Moeka Kiryu over.
5	"Solitude of the Astigmatism: Entangled Sheep"; Transliteration: "Hitenshūsa no Sorichūdo" (Japanese: 非点収差のソリチュード Entangled Sheep)	May 10, 2018
Moeka, who works as an editorial writer in the current world line, is hired by Daru to help search for Kagari, learning that another group has also been searching for her. Just then, Rintaro gets a call from Maho about what appears to be a kidnapper, only to discover it to just be a fellow scientist named Judy Reyes. Noticing that Rintaro has been ignoring Amadeus Kurisu's calls recently, Maho suggests to him that it may be better to give up his role as a tester. Later, Luka arrives at the lab with an amnesiac girl, whose only clue to her memory is the sole item in her possession, an old Upa toy. When Mayuri and Suzuha arrive, the girl collapses upon seeing Mayuri, while Suzuha recognizes her as Kagari.
6	"Eclipse of Orbital Ordering: The Orbital Eclipse"; Transliteration: "Kidōchitsujo no Ekuripusu" (Japanese: 軌道秩序のエクリプス The Orbital Eclipse)	May 17, 2018
As Kagari and Mayuri form a bond despite not knowing each other, Rintaro asks Moeka to continue searching for the group that has been looking for Kagari. Later, the gang celebrates New Year's by dressing up as shrine maidens at Luka's shrine. As the group moves to the lab to continue their celebrations, Amadeus calls in, making her presence known to everyone else. Just then, Amadeus suddenly disappears and armed men storm the lab.
7	"Eclipse of Vibronic Transition: Vibronic Transition"; Transliteration: "Fuden Sen'i no Ekuripusu" (Japanese: 振電遷移のエクリプス Vibronic Transition)	May 24, 2018
The armed men attempt to abduct Kagari but are forced to flee empty-handed when Yugo Tennouji arrives and disarms them. Concluding that the group are not the same Rounders he had previously encountered, Rintaro approaches Tennouji, using his knowledge over him being a member of a Rounder group connected to SERN in order to acquire his help in protecting Kagari. Meanwhile, as Maho continues to find herself locked out of Amadeus, Luka tries to question Suzuha over what everyone is keeping from him. Later, Rintaro suddenly receives a distress call from Amadeus, at which point his Reading Steiner activates and he is sent to another world line where Kurisu is still alive.
8	"Dual of Antinomy: Antinomic Dual"; Transliteration: "Niritsuhaihan no Dyuaru" (Japanese: 二律背反のデュアル Antinomic Dual)	May 31, 2018
Rintaro soon comes to realize that he has once again ended up in the alpha world line where Mayuri is dead, as the Rintaro of this world line couldn't go through with sacrificing Kurisu to save her. Realizing that this Rintaro came from another world line, Kurisu reveals she has rebuilt the Phone Microwave, asking him to use it to return to his world line. As Rintaro struggles with his decision, Kurisu takes him to Mayuri's grave, urging him to wake up from his dream. After advising Rintaro not to interact so much with Amadeus, Kurisu kisses Rintaro before sending a D-Mail to her past self, delaying her long enough to prevent Rintaro from deleting their data from SERN and returning to the beta world line.
9	"Pandora of Eternal Return: Pandora's Box"; Transliteration: "Eigō Kaiki no Pandora" (Japanese: 永劫回帰のパンドラ Pandora's Box)	June 7, 2018
As Rintaro arrives back in the beta world line, where Amadeus' takeover has been prevented, he discovers Mayuri's friend Katsumi "Fubuki" Nakase, who was hospitalized after they both collapsed, has memories of the alpha world line he was just in. After arranging for Maho to stay with Faris after her hotel is burgled, Rintaro is questioned by Suzuha about the shift in world line, revealing that it was caused by time machine experiments by America and Russia. Fearing she is running out of time, Suzuha tries to force Rintaro to go back in time with her, but Daru convinces her to stop. Later, Tennouji informs Rintaro about an organization known as DURPA, leading him to suspect that they may be targeting Amadeus to obtain Kurisu's time machine theory. Rintaro asks Maho if she possesses any of Kurisu's research, but she lies, keeping it a secret that she has Kurisu's personal laptop.
10	"Pandora of Provable Existence: Forbidden Cubicle"; Transliteration: "Sonzai Shōmei no Pandora" (Japanese: 存在証明のパンドラ Forbidden Cubicle)	June 14, 2018
Hiring Moeka as a bodyguard, Maho gets Amadeus running again and resumes testing with Rintaro before having a slumber party with Faris and Moeka. The next day, Rintaro, Maho, and Amadeus spend the day going around Akihabara, ending up at the Radio Building where Kurisu was killed. After Maho reveals to him that she possesses Kurisu's laptop, Rintaro warns her that the data on it is what will spark World War III.
11	"Pandora of Forgotten Existence: Sealed Reliquary"; Transliteration: "Sonzai Bōkyaku no Pandora" (Japanese: 存在忘却のパンドラ Sealed Reliquary)	June 21, 2018
Meeting up with Daru, who had been hired by Maho to analyze Kurisu's laptop, Rintaro decides to tell Maho the truth about time machines, warning her that she mustn't attempt to use one herself to save Kurisu. The group becomes surrounded by a hostile group who take Maho hostage, demanding the laptop in exchange. However, another group appears and destroys the laptop, leaving Maho upset that she couldn't protect Kurisu's legacy. Later, Maho and Prof. Alexis Leskinen return to America, bringing Rintaro's time with Amadeus to an end.
12	"Mother Goose of Mutual Recursion: Recursive Mother Goose"; Transliteration: "Sōgosaiki no Mazā Gūsu" (Japanese: 相互再帰のマザーグース Recursive Mother Goose)	June 28, 2018
Kagari collapses again after hearing Mayuri singing a song, which Rintaro believes may be a hint to regaining her memories. He finds that Mayuri had learned the song from Suzuha, who herself had learned it from Yuki in the future. Yuki then reveals she had learned the song from Rintaro's mother, who claims he was the one who sang it to her back when he first started his mad scientist phase. While visiting Mayuri's grandmother's grave for any clues, Kagari goes into a daze upon hearing a song on the radio and almost gets hit by a truck, after which she regains her memories of Mayuri being her mother. It is then revealed that Rintaro had learned the song from Kagari herself years ago, before she was spotted by a mysterious organization.
13	"Mother Goose of Diffractive Recitativo: Diffraction Mother Goose"; Transliteration: "Kaisetsu Joshō no Mazā Gūsu" (Japanese: 回折叙唱のマザーグース Diffraction Mother Goose)	July 5, 2018
Despite Kagari regaining her childhood memories of Mayuri, who is informed about her future relationship with Kagari, Rintaro and Daru remain curious about what happened during the past twelve years that she still doesn't remember. During an argument with her, Suzuha notices a contradiction in Kagari's recollection of their separation, with Tennouji suggesting to Rintaro that it may have been the result of brainwashing. The next day, Rintaro goes with Moeka to investigate an abandoned building located near where Kagari was found, discovering it to be a secret facility where Kagari was held captive. Meanwhile, as Kagari heads to a party held by Mayuri, she hears a song that causes more memories to resurface, at which point she starts hearing a voice and disappears somewhere.
14	"Recognition of the Elastic Limit: Presage or Recognize"; Transliteration: "Dansei Genkai no Rikogunaizu" (Japanese: 弾性限界のリコグナイズ Presage or Recognize)	July 19, 2018
As months pass with no sign of Kagari, Daru and Suzuha try to ask for Maho's help in building a time leap machine. Meanwhile, Fubuki is once again brought to the hospital, where Rintaro runs into Leskinen. Back at the lab, Suzuha, who had found Kagari's Upa toy on the floor of the lab, is attacked by a brainwashed Kagari when she returns to reclaim it. Realizing that Kagari was already brainwashed before traveling to the past, Suzuha and Daru once again ask Maho for help. She is encouraged by Amadeus Kurisu to return to Japan, and decides to help them with the time machine.
15	"Recognition of the Asymptotic Line: Recognize Asymptote"; Transliteration: "Zankinsen no Rikogunaizu" (Japanese: 漸近線のリコグナイズ Recognize Asymptote)	July 26, 2018
As Maho arrives back in Japan, Suzuha, fearing that her future birth might be at stake, asks for everyone's help in making Daru confident enough to confess to Yuki before she ends up with someone else. To this end, Maho uses a device that seemingly transforms Daru into a lady's man in time for a date with Yuki. However, this plan does not seem to go well as Yuki ends up running off. As Daru feels downhearted, Suzuha revealed she had lied about there being someone else so she could remind herself of the peace she experienced before Yuki was killed in the future. Encouraged by Suzuha's sincerity, Daru decides to just be himself around Yuki on their next date, which ends with a successful confession. Seeing Daru and Yuki together gives Suzuha the self-confidence she needs as Kagari watches from afar.
16	"Altair of the Point at Infinity: Vega and Altair"; Transliteration: "Mugen'en-ten no Arutairu" (Japanese: 無限遠点のアルタイル Vega and Altair)	August 2, 2018
Rintaro continues his efforts to qualify to study overseas, which seems to trouble Mayuri. Meanwhile, Daru and Maho continue to develop the time leap machine with little success when Rintaro arrives and discovers it. He then angrily rants about how it is impossible to save both Mayuri and Kurisu, and that he chose to sacrifice Kurisu to protect Mayuri and the Beta worldline. Maho counters that Steins;Gate must exist, and they must merely discover the "formula" that will lead them there. With neither side backing down, Rintaro takes his leave and encounters Mayuri, who reveals that she heard his argument with Maho and Daru. She tells Rintaro that she regrets convincing him not to continue to try to save Kurisu, as she can tell he is still suffering and not truly happy in this worldline.
17	"Altair of the Hyperbolic Plane: Beltrami Pseudosphere"; Transliteration: "Sōkyoku Heimen no Arutairu" (Japanese: 双曲平面のアルタイル Beltrami Pseudosphere)	August 9, 2018
Mayuri asks Suzuha to tell her everything she knows about the future and what Rintaro has been through, learning that Suzuha plans to travel back to the past later that day. Wishing to see Kyouma Hououin again despite her romantic feelings for Rintaro, Mayuri decides to go with Suzuha to the past to convince the Rintaro of the past not to give up on saving Kurisu. At that moment, however, Rintaro learns from Maho that someone has managed to access Kurisu's knowledge of time machines from the Amadeus data, trying but failing to convince Suzuha and Mayuri not to travel back in time. As Suzuha heads for the time machine, she receives a D-mail from Daru in 2025, telling her that her actions have changed the worldline, and gives her the details of "Operation Arclight". At that moment, armed soldiers arrive to seize the time machine. Suzuha battles the soldiers to give Mayuri a chance to escape, but Mayuri is shot in the crossfire.
18	"Altair of Translational Symmetry: Translational Symmetry"; Transliteration: "Heishin Taishō no Arutairu" (Japanese: 並進対称のアルタイル Translational Symmetry)	August 16, 2018
Angered over Mayuri getting hurt, Kagari attacks the other soldiers, taking fatal damage in the process. Meanwhile, Rintaro is confronted by Leskinen, who reveals himself to be a member of Stratfor who obtained knowledge of the future from Kagari. Taking Maho and Daru hostage, Leskinen reveals his future self had brainwashed Kagari, and arranged for her to go back to the past as a messenger to his younger self, leading him to create Amadeus as a means to preserve Kurisu's time travel theory. Just as Leskinen attempts to take the time machine for himself, Kagari uses the last of her strength to give Suzuha a chance to save everyone and knock Leskinen out. Mayuri and Suzuha attempt to use the time machine but are hit by a DURPA helicopter missile, resulting in the time machine being destroyed and their fate becoming unknown. As Rintaro is left distraught by the event, he receives a text from Mayuri explaining her reasons for wanting to go back and change past events.
19	"Altair of the Cyclic Coordinate: Time-Leap Machine"; Transliteration: "Junkan Zahyō no Arutairu" (Japanese: 循環座標のアルタイル Time-Leap Machine)	August 23, 2018
With the destruction of the time machine signaling the start of World War III, Rintaro gives Maho and Daru the knowledge they need to complete the time leap machine. With some encouragement from Amadeus Kurisu, Maho manages to complete the time leap machine, which Rintaro uses to leap back in time to before the incident. After urging Maho and Daru to hack into Leskinen's computer and retrieve Amadeus' data, Rintaro rushes to Mayuri and Suzuha to warn them of what's about to happen, learning of their plan to convince his past self to pursue Steins;Gate again. Just as Rintaro urges them to go, he is attacked by another soldier, revealed to be Prof. Reyes, who is then shot by Leskinen. This ultimately leads to the time machine getting destroyed again, prompting Rintaro to once again keep time leaping until he can save Mayuri and Suzuha.
20	"Rinascimento of the Unwavering Promise: Promised Rinascimento"; Transliteration: "Meisei no Rinashimento" (Japanese: 盟誓のリナシメント Promised Rinascimento)	September 6, 2018
Following his previous time leap attempt, Rintaro wakes up to discover he has suddenly ended up in the year 2036, where Akihabara has been devastated by World War III, and Daru, Suzuha, and the others have formed a resistance. Daru explains he was able to use the recently recovered time leap machine to implant Rintaro's 2011 memories into his current body and recounts the events that occurred in Rintaro's mental absence: in 2011, the time leap machine malfunctioned and they missed the 48-hour window to save Mayuri so they decided to try to build a new time machine. In 2025, Rintaro was captured and tortured by Stratfor. When Daru rescued him, he was brain-dead but alive. For the next 11 years, Rintaro's survival was kept secret between a select few resistance members who cared for him. As Daru finishes his explanation, Luka and Faris are caught up in an enemy trap, with Luka sacrificing himself to protect the other members before dying in Rintaro's arms. Realizing the truth he had refused to face, Rintaro asks to use the time leap machine to return to 2011, in order to find a way to the Steins;Gate world line.
21	"Rinascimento of Image Formation: Return of Phoenix"; Transliteration: "Yuizō no Rinashimento" (Japanese: 結像のリナシメント Return of Phoenix)	September 13, 2018
With help from Amadeus Kurisu, Rintaro begins a grueling journey to return to the past by performing consecutive time leaps. After reaching 2025, the day where he is supposed to be captured, Rintaro receives help from Amadeus and the others to evade capture and reach Akihabara, allowing him to make the complete journey to 2011. Reawakening his old mad scientist persona, Rintaro asks Daru to recover Amadeus' data while he enlists Tennouji's help in subduing Kagari, allowing him and Moeka to stop Leskinen and help send Mayuri and Suzuha safely into the past. However, the attack helicopters show up earlier than usual, launching another missile strike as the time machine activates.
22	"Rinascimento of Projection: Project Amadeus"; Transliteration: "Tōtaku no Rinashimento" (Japanese: 投企のリナシメント Project Amadeus)	September 20, 2018
With each attempt at saving Mayuri and Suzuha failing, Rintaro deduces that they need to stop the Russians from interfering with the time machine's departure. Finding that Russia's ability to make a time machine lies with Kurisu's memory data, Amadeus Kurisu proposes that the only way to stop Russia is to use Daru's D-RINE (a custom app-messaging system that can send D-Mails without them being detected by SERN) to send a message to himself in the past to delete Amadeus. Speaking with a hesitant Rintaro through the night, Amadeus Kurisu tells him that she would be glad to sacrifice herself if it means finding Steins;Gate, and avoiding WWIII. After Amadeus Kurisu says her goodbyes to everyone, the D-RINE is sent, erasing Amadeus and sending Rintaro to a new world line.
23	"Arclight of the Point at Infinity: Arclight of the Sky / Milky-way Crossing"; Transliteration: "Mugen'en-ten no Ākuraito / Kōsa Zahyō no Sutādasuto" (Japanese: 無限遠点のアークライト Arc-light of the Sky / 交差座標のスターダスト Milky-Way Crossing)	September 27, 2018
Arriving in a world line where Amadeus doesn't exist, Rintaro heads to the roof, receiving help from Moeka in getting past Leskinen. As Rintaro urges Mayuri and Suzuha to travel into the past, Kagari, who decides to place her faith in Rintaro, helps him to hold back the enemy just long enough for the time machine to successfully leave before the helicopter attacks. Arriving just before Rintaro returns from his failed rescue attempt, Mayuri calls her past self with an encouraging message, asking that she set Rintaro on the right path, after which she and Suzuha are forced to jump into a random time period to avoid causing a time paradox. The past Mayuri slaps Rintaro to knock him back to his senses, and then receives a D-mail from Rintaro. In the year 2025, Rintaro sends his past self a video instructing him on how to save both Mayuri and Kurisu and reach Steins;Gate before setting off in a time machine to find Mayuri and Suzuha. Meanwhile, Mayuri and Suzuha have become trapped somewhere at an unknown barren land in the year 18,000 BC when they see Rintaro arrive in his time machine to rescue them.
OVA	"Valentine's of Crystal Polymorphism: Bittersweet Intermedio"; Transliteration: "Kesshō Takei no Barentain" (Japanese: 結晶多形のバレンタイン Bittersweet Day)	December 21, 2018
As Valentine's Day approaches, Suzuha becomes curious about who Kagari wants to give chocolate to. With the other girls wanting to give chocolates as well, Faris holds a chocolate-making session which starts as a disaster since nobody knows how to cook, but everything is soon saved by Luka and Yuki. It is only after Kagari disappears that Suzuha discovers the chocolates she made were for everyone she holds dear.
