= List of Steins;Gate episodes =

Steins;Gate Blu-ray volume 1 cover, featuring Kurisu Makise

Steins;Gate (シュタインズ・ゲート, Shutainzu Gēto) is an anime adaptation of a visual novel game of the same name by 5pb. and Nitroplus. It follows a self-proclaimed mad scientist named Rintaro Okabe who, along with his friends, invents a microwave that can send text messages into the past, leading to him discovering that he retains his memory between alternate timelines.

The series is produced by White Fox and aired in Japan from April 6, 2011, to September 13, 2011, also being simulcast on Crunchyroll. An original video animation episode was released with the final BD/DVD volume on February 22, 2012. The series has been licensed in North America by Funimation Entertainment. The anime features two pieces of theme music; the opening theme is "Hacking to the Gate" by Kanako Itō while the ending theme is "Toki Tsukasadoru Jūni no Meiyaku" (刻司ル十二ノ盟約; "The Twelve Time-Governing Covenants") by Yui Sakakibara. The ending theme for episode 22 is Fake Verthandi, which can be heard at the same moment in the visual novel. The ending theme for episode 23 is "Skyclad no Kansokusha" (スカイクラッドの観測者, Sukaikuraddo no Kansokusha; "The Skyclad Observer") by Kanako Itō, which is the opening theme to the console version of the visual novel. An animated film sequel, Steins;Gate: The Movie − Load Region of Déjà Vu, was released on April 20, 2013. A series of short original net animation episodes, titled Steins;Gate: Sōmei Eichi no Cognitive Computing, have also been produced in collaboration with IBM. On December 2, 2015, an alternate version of the 23rd episode was aired as a part of the rebroadcast of the series, to promote Steins;Gate 0 and its anime adaptation.

== Episodes ==
No.	Title	Original release date
1	"Turning Point"(Prologue to the Beginning and End); Transliteration: "Hajimari to Owari no Purorōgu" (Japanese: 始まりと終わりのプロローグ)	April 6, 2011
In the summer of 2010, self-proclaimed mad scientist Rintaro Okabe and his childhood friend Mayuri Shiina go to the Akihabara Radio Kaikan building to attend a seminar on time travel by Doctor Nakabachi. Whilst there, Rintaro meets a girl named Kurisu Makise, who claims to have met him fifteen minutes before despite Rintaro never having met her. Later, after receiving a scrambled video message on his phone, Rintaro hears a scream and discovers Kurisu lying in a pool of blood, indicating that she was stabbed to death. Upon sending an e-mail about the situation to his friend, Itaru "Daru" Hashida, Rintaro feels a strange sensation, before discovering the streets have become vacant and a strange satellite has crashed into the radio building. Later, as Rintaro's "Future Gadget Laboratory" works on a phone-controlled microwave that turns bananas into gelatinous form, Rintaro is surprised to learn that the seminar he was attending was apparently canceled as if it had never taken place. Afterward, as Rintaro and Daru go to a forum being held, Rintaro discovers the e-mail he sent Daru about Kurisu's stabbing had arrived five days earlier, before coming across Kurisu, who is alive and well.
2	"Time Travel Paranoia"; Transliteration: "Jikan Chōyaku no Paranoia" (Japanese: 時間跳躍のパラノイア)	April 13, 2011
Surprised to find Kurisu alive, Rintaro is subsequently humiliated by her during a lecture concerning the unlikeliness of time travel. After getting some provisions from the androgynous Luka Urushibara, Rintaro meets Suzuha Amane, who is hired by his landlord Yūgo "Mr. Braun" Tennōji as a part-time assistant in his electronics shop. Later, Rintaro investigates the supposedly altered events and learns that a man calling himself John Titor, who claimed in 2000 that he was a time traveler, has surfaced once more in 2010. Believing this John Titor to be a fake, Rintaro is shocked to find that all evidence of Titor appearing in 2000 has disappeared. The next day, Rintaro encounters a strange woman named Moeka Kiryū who asks for information on a retro PC model called the IBN 5100, which Rintaro gathers from Daru. Later, as Rintaro and Daru once again experiment with their Phonewave, a banana disappears from the oven and appears reattached to its bunch in gel form, at which point Kurisu arrives at the lab.
3	"Parallel World Paranoia"(Parallel Process Paranoia); Transliteration: "Heiretsu Katei no Paranoia" (Japanese: 並列過程のパラノイア)	April 20, 2011
Rintaro agrees to let Kurisu examine their PhoneWave on the condition that she becomes one of his fellow lab members. Performing another experiment with the PhoneWave, which causes a burst of electricity when Mayuri opens it, Rintaro succeeds in sending another e-mail to the past. This leads Rintaro to deduce that their PhoneWave is actually a time machine capable of sending text messages to the past. As Kurisu leaves the lab in denial, Rintaro hears about the Large Hadron Collider and micro black holes and asks Daru to hack into SERN. Later, after hearing from Titor about SERN allegedly creating a dystopian future, Rintaro and Daru learn that SERN has been performing top-secret experiments with micro black holes, which have resulted in human deaths.
4	"Interpreter Rendezvous"; Transliteration: "Kūri Hōkō no Randevū" (Japanese: 空理彷徨のランデヴー)	April 27, 2011
With further information about SERN's time travel experiments encrypted in a code that Daru can't decipher, Rintaro learns from Titor that he needs the IBN 5100 computer Moeka was looking for to decode it. While out doing his laundry, Rintaro runs into Kurisu, who is still in denial about a time machine existing, and tells her about the IBN 5100. As Kurisu hears from a contact about the computer's capabilities, maid café owner Faris Nyannyan informs Rintaro that her family had donated an IBN 5100 to Luka's family shrine. Managing to borrow the IBN 5100 from Luka's father, Rintaro and Kurisu carry it back to the lab.
5	"Starmine Rendezvous"; Transliteration: "Denka Shōtotsu no Randevū" (Japanese: 電荷衝突のランデヴー)	May 4, 2011
Arriving back at the lab with Rintaro, Kurisu is met with a strange reaction from Suzuha. While the gang gathering parts needed to connect the IBN 5100 with Daru's PC, Suzuha warns Rintaro to be cautious of Kurisu. Using the IBN 5100 to decipher SERN's encrypted files, Rintaro, Daru, and Kurisu learn that various people have been found dead in a gel-like state at various points in time as a result of their experiments. Kurisu deduces that the gelatinous state is the result of matter being squeezed at a molecular level whilst passing through the micro-black hole. Despite the shock of this news, Rintaro vows to perfect the PhoneWave.
6	"Butterfly Effect's Divergence"; Transliteration: "Chōyoku no Daibājensu" (Japanese: 蝶翼のダイバージェンス)	May 11, 2011
Dubbing the messages they send to the past as "D-Mails", the group conducts further experiments, deducing the rules and limitations of sending D-Mails. They learn what time they can send messages, how much data can be sent, and how far they can send them back. The next day, Moeka shows up at the lab to see the IBN 5100 and seeks to borrow it from Rintaro. After failing to hide the nature of their experiments from her, Rintaro ends up making Moeka his fifth lab member.
7	"Divergence Singularity"; Transliteration: "Dansō no Daibājensu" (Japanese: 断層のダイバージェンス)	May 18, 2011
After Daru updates the Phone Microwave's firmware, Rintaro decides to perform an experiment attempting to change history by sending winning lottery numbers to the past. Upon sending the D-Mail, he experiences a sensation similar to the one he had before the satellite crash. Discovering no one else was aware that the experiment ever took place, Rintaro finds his D-Mail had indeed led to Luka purchasing a lottery ticket, although his own personal error led him to get the number wrong. After a brief encounter with Suzuha, Rintaro deduces that the D-Mail had shifted him to a World Line in which Luka had bought a lottery ticket and the D-Mail experiment never took place, explaining everyone's altered memories. Confused as to why only he can remember the previous World Line, Rintaro contacts Titor, who tells him he may have the power to become a messiah and lead the world beyond the "1% Divergence" point and hence, change the dystopian future.
8	"Chaos Theory Homeostasis I"; Transliteration: "Mugen no Homeosutashisu" (Japanese: 夢幻のホメオスタシス)	May 25, 2011
Rintaro explains the nature of the World Line shift to Daru and Kurisu and how he is the only one who can remember its changes, an ability he refers to as "Reading Steiner". As the experiments resume, Moeka requests to send a D-Mail, which shifts Rintaro to a new World Line where no one else remembers Moeka. The next day, Luka comes to the lab, asking to send a D-Mail to before he was born so that he would be born as a girl. Using an urban myth about how a diet can affect a baby's gender before birth, the group sends a D-Mail to the pager of Luka's mother. As a result, Rintaro arrives in another world line, although he doesn't notice any obvious changes.
9	"Chaos Theory Homeostasis II"; Transliteration: "Gensō no Homeosutashisu" (Japanese: 幻相のホメオスタシス)	June 1, 2011
As Faris learns about the PhoneWave upon overhearing a discussion between Rintaro and Daru, Rintaro discovers that the IBN has gone missing from the lab, which was apparently never found in the first place as a result of Moeka's D-Mail. Kurisu deduces that the minor changes to the past that resulted from their previous D-Mails have caused a butterfly effect, leading to changes beyond their control. After learning that the IBN 5100 had been previously taken from Luka's shrine, Rintaro finds Moeka in town and confronts her, only to learn that she does not know the whereabouts of the IBN either. Rintaro also discovers that, unlike the previous World Line, everyone has met Moeka before in the current one, giving credence to Kurisu's theory. Rintaro and the others later visit Faris, whose true identity is revealed to be Rumiho Akiha, whose family owns Akihabara. Faris offers them information on the IBN 5100 in exchange for being allowed to send a D-Mail ten years into the past. Rintaro reluctantly agrees and allows her to send the D-Mail, causing him to experience another World Line shift. After learning from Faris's father that they no longer have the IBN 5100 in their possession, Rintaro discovers that the physical geography of Akihabara has completely changed, no longer being a mecca for anime culture.
10	"Chaos Theory Homeostasis III"; Transliteration: "Sōsei no Homeosutashisu" (Japanese: 相生のホメオスタシス)	June 8, 2011
Realising the D-Mail Faris sent prevented moe culture from being introduced into Akihabara, he discovers that Luka's earlier D-Mail had in fact changed his sex to female. Afterward, Rintaro talks with Suzuha, who reveals she came to Tokyo to try to find her father, mentioning she will leave if she is unable to find him the next day. Rintaro then establishes her as a lab member and invites her to the lab for a farewell party. While preparing for the party, Rintaro receives a threatening text message telling him that someone is watching him, with a picture of a gelatin treat attached. Later, while shopping with Mayuri, he recalls that his Reading Steiner ability may have first occurred when he was a child. Later that night, Suzuha sends a farewell text to Rintaro, prompting him to send a D-Mail and instructing himself to convince Suzuha to attend the party and stay in Tokyo.
11	"Dogma in Event Horizon"; Transliteration: "Jikū Kyōkai no Doguma" (Japanese: 時空境界のドグマ)	June 15, 2011
Rintaro discovers that a CRT television in the electronics shop below the lab has been serving as the "lifter" from the PhoneWave, as the D-Mails can only be sent when it is turned on. Kurisu then theorizes that it might be possible to send frontal lobe memories back in time through the PhoneWave, allowing the consciousness of a person to "time leap" into the past. As Rintaro goes into town with Mayuri to look for parts Kurisu needs, he explains to her that a time leap may be safer to conduct than simply sending D-Mails due to the nature of chaos theory, as the D-Mails can produce unexpected consequences once sent. They run into Moeka along the way, as well as Suzuha, who tells Rintaro that Kurisu allegedly works for SERN. As Kurisu denies this, she tells Rintaro about the problems she has with her father, who grew to hate her because she surpassed him in scientific prowess. Later on when out shopping, Okabe receives another threatening text message with a picture of a severed doll's head attached, causing him to return to the lab, fearing for Mayuri's safety. Later, Daru informs the group that the lab has been connected to the SERN network without them knowing.
12	"Dogma in Ergosphere"; Transliteration: "Seishi Genkai no Doguma" (Japanese: 静止限界のドグマ)	June 22, 2011
With the ability to utilize SERN's LHC to compress memories into D-Mail size, Kurisu completes her time leap machine, capable of sending one's memories up to two days into the past. However, Rintaro, still disturbed by the threatening texts he has received, decides against using the device, suggesting they instead make their discoveries public. As the lab members decide to have a party, Kurisu comes into conflict with Suzuha, who claims she is destined to become a SERN spy in the future, but Mayuri manages to calm things down between them. While a bomb threat to the rail system is televised, Suzuha, after hearing about the lab's connection to SERN, flees the lab. Led by Moeka, a group of armed men storms the lab, who reveals herself to be a "Rounder" hired by SERN. She orders Rintaro, Kurisu, and Daru to be detained before shooting and killing Mayuri, whom she deems as not being necessary.
13	"Metaphysics Necrosis"; Transliteration: "Keijijō no Nekurōshisu" (Japanese: 形而上のネクローシス)	June 29, 2011
Moments after Mayuri's death, Suzuha rushes into the lab and creates a distraction, allowing Kurisu to use the time leap machine to send Rintaro back in time to 5 pm the same day. Rintaro drives everyone out of the lab before frantically searching for Mayuri, during which he receives a call from Kurisu, who deduces that he made a time leap. Finding Mayuri, Rintaro attempts to flee with her to the station, only for the trains to have stopped. When they are both approached by Rounders, they attempt to flee, but Mayuri is once again killed when she is run over by Moeka's car. Escaping the Rounders' clutches and performing another time leap, Rintaro locates Mayuri earlier and escapes to the subway station. However, Mayuri is killed once again when Yūgo's daughter, Nae, accidentally pushes her into the path of an oncoming train. Devastated, Rintaro vows to keep leaping to the past until he manages to save Mayuri.
14	"Physically Necrosis"; Transliteration: "Keijika no Nekurōshisu" (Japanese: 形而下のネクローシス)	July 6, 2011
As each of Rintaro's attempts to save Mayuri keep failing, he learns from Moeka that the lab was targeted by SERN due to their creation of a time machine and their plan to publicly announce it. Falling into despair over his repeated failures, Rintaro is approached by Kurisu, who gets him to reveal his situation and gives him key trigger phrases to get her past self to cooperate with him. After being sent to just before the time leap machine's completion, Rintaro manages to obtain Kurisu's aid before they are both approached by Suzuha. She explains that to save Mayuri, they need to escape the "Alpha World Line Attractor Field", where Mayuri is doomed to die, due to the converging nature of world lines, and cross the 1% Divergence point to the Beta World Line, where the outcome might be different. Suzuha then takes Rintaro and Kurisu to the crashed satellite, which turns out to be a time machine, and reveals she is in fact "John Titor" and has come from the year 2036.
15	"Missing Link Necrosis"; Transliteration: "Bōkanjō no Nekurōshisu" (Japanese: 亡環上のネクローシス)	July 13, 2011
Suzuha explains how SERN was able to build a time machine and use it to create a totalitarian world in 2036, stating that she had originally planned to travel to 1975 to acquire an IBN 5100, but made a detour to the year 2010 to look for her father. When she tries to start the time machine, she discovers it has broken down, which Rintaro realizes was a result of the storm on the night he stopped her from leaving. Leaping two days before the completion of the time leap machine, Rintaro gathers the lab members to inform them of the situation. While Daru is tasked with fixing Suzuha's time machine, Mayuri suggests that everyone also helps Suzuha find her father, using a pin badge he gave her as a clue. Suzuha also gives Rintaro a device called the Divergence Meter, which keeps track of the magnitude of differences between World Lines, and tells him about how he founded the resistance against SERN in the future. After spending the day searching for Suzuha's father, Rintaro is thanked by Suzuha before receiving a lead on Suzuha's father from a badge maker.
16	"Sacrificial Necrosis"; Transliteration: "Fukagyaku no Nekurōshisu" (Japanese: 不可逆のネクローシス)	July 20, 2011
Unable to get much information about the badge maker's client, Rintaro decides to leap back in time to confront the client in question, only to find it was Daru, who wanted to make a fake badge to cheer Suzuha up. Daru then reveals that Suzuha's time machine is only able to travel backward in time, meaning they won't be able to see her again once she leaves. As the repairs to the time machine are completed, Mayuri deduces from the time machine's name that Suzuha's father is actually Daru. After a short reunion, Suzuha travels back to 1975, though Rintaro notices the Divergence Meter's reading has not changed. A few hours later, Yugo delivers a letter written by Suzuha in the year 2000, revealing that she had committed suicide a year later. In the letter, Suzuha laments that she had failed her mission, as the damages to the time machine caused her to crash and lose her memories for 24 years. Blaming himself for stopping Suzuha on the night of the storm that damaged the time machine, Rintaro sends a D-Mail that stops him from following Suzuha, letting her use the time machine before it was damaged, but making her forget meeting her father. Speaking with Yugo again in the new World Line, Rintaro learns that Suzuha had died of illness instead and receives her Divergence Meter, which is now showing a different value.
17	"Made in Complex"; Transliteration: "Kyozō Waikyoku no Konpurekkusu" (Japanese: 虚像歪曲のコンプレックス)	July 27, 2011
Despite the change in divergence, Mayuri's death still takes place, albeit a day later than in the previous World Line. Kurisu theorizes that, since negating Rintaro's D-Mail stopping Suzuha delayed the attack, undoing the effects of the other D-Mails could bring them back to a World Line where they have an IBN 5100, allowing them to hack into SERN and delete the records that set them on their trail. Rintaro starts by trying to figure out how to reverse Faris's D-Mail. After helping her evade a rival gang of Rai-Net players, Rintaro takes Faris to the place where her maid café used to be and tells her about the way Akihabara was. This causes Faris to recall some of her memories from that World Line and the D-Mail she sent: a fake ransom note, which prevented her father from boarding a plane fated to crash. The rival gang catches up to them, but they are rescued by the arrival of Faris's father. Speaking to him, Rintaro learns that he was forced to sell the IBN 5100 he had to pay for the fake kidnapping's ransom. After accepting the reality of her father's death, Faris agrees to send a D-Mail canceling out her previous one, turning Akihabara back into a moe hub. The IBN 5100, however, remains out of Rintaro's reach.
18	"Fractal Androgynous"; Transliteration: "Jiko Sōji no Andorogyunosu" (Japanese: 自己相似のアンドロギュノス)	August 3, 2011
Rintaro tells Luka about how she used to be a male and urges her to reverse the D-Mail responsible to change Mayuri's fate. While she initially doesn't believe him, she later agrees to do so on the condition that Rintaro takes her on a date. Despite Kurisu and Daru's advice on dating, Rintaro and Luka spend their date together in an awkward conversation. Like Faris, Luka eventually recalls the previous World Line where she was a male, distressing her as a return to it would prevent her from pursuing her feelings for Rintaro. Before sending the D-Mail that would negate Luka's first one, Rintaro realizes that the reason they did not enjoy their date was that he was trying to be someone he was not. As a result, Rintaro returns to the shrine and spends the rest of the day training with Luka like they used to. With their relationship repaired, Rintaro sends the D-Mail, moving back to a World Line where Luka is a boy, leaving the next D-Mail to be reversed: Moeka's.
19	"Endless Apoptosis"; Transliteration: "Mugen Rensa no Apotōshisu" (Japanese: 無限連鎖のアポトーシス)	August 10, 2011
Arriving at Moeka's apartment only to learn that she committed suicide, Rintaro leaps to an earlier time, finding Moeka to be a nervous wreck due to not having been contacted by a person known as FB, who had given her the orders to find the IBN 5100. Rintaro steals Moeka's phone and sends a D-Mail from it, but discovers that she had lied about the contents of the message she had sent in the previous World Line. Confronting Moeka about FB and telling her about her future suicide, Rintaro finds the offending text, which involved the location of the IBN 5100, but annulling it via another D-Mail still does not change the World Line. As Okabe realises he needs to send a D-Mail from FB's phone to convince her past self to follow its instructions, Moeka, feeling betrayed by FB for not contacting her, tells him where to find the IBN 5100.
20	"Finalize Apoptosis"; Transliteration: "Ensa Danzetsu no Apotōshisu" (Japanese: 怨嗟断絶のアポトーシス)	August 17, 2011
Despite Okabe knowing the location of the IBN 5100, Kurisu advises against trying to steal it, instead suggesting that he stake out the location to find FB, with Moeka deciding to join him. As they observe the IBN 5100 being taken out, they follow it as it is passed along to several people, including Yugo, before it ends up on a plane bound for France, where SERN is located. Rintaro, Moeka, and Kurisu go to confront Yugo, who reveals himself to be FB, and a Rounder who was forced to do SERN's bidding to prevent harm from befalling Nae. Following the code of the Rounders for those who fail their mission, Yugo kills Moeka before taking his own life. Rintaro then uses Yugo's cell phone to finally cancel out Moeka's D-Mail, returning to a World Line where both Moeka and Yugo are alive and the IBN 5100 is once again in their possession at the Future Gadget Lab. As Rintaro gets Daru to hack into the SERN network to erase the data they have on them, he comes to the sudden realization that by doing so, he would have to return to a World Line where Kurisu is dead.
21	"Paradox Meltdown"; Transliteration: "Ingaritsu no Meruto" (Japanese: 因果律のメルト)	August 24, 2011
Not wanting to move to a World Line where Kurisu dies, Rintaro decides against the hacking. Too afraid to tell Kurisu the reason behind his change of plans, Rintaro accompanies Mayuri to a comic market, trying to think of a way he can save her without sacrificing Kurisu. As a car appears during Mayuri's fated time to die, Rintaro attempts to change destiny by letting the car hit him instead, but Mayuri pushes him out of the way and dies in his place. After he leaps back in time, Kurisu has Rintaro reveal to her that she dies in the Beta World Line. Later, Rintaro finds Mayuri visiting her grandmother's grave, overhearing that she's been having dreams of the times she has died and that she has noticed Okabe's suffering. Meanwhile, Kurisu visits the location where she is destined to die in the Beta World Line.
22	"Being Meltdown"; Transliteration: "Sonzai Ryōkai no Meruto" (Japanese: 存在了解のメルト)	August 31, 2011
Kurisu reveals to Rintaro that she recalls her stabbing from dreams, as well as Rintaro's various attempts at saving Mayuri. When Kurisu tells Rintaro that he should save Mayuri over her, he cannot accept it and runs back to the lab. As Rintaro attempts to time leap again, Kurisu stops him, worried that seeing Mayuri die over and over will destroy him. After giving in and choosing to save Mayuri, Rintaro tells Kurisu he loves her, to which she responds by kissing him. The next day, Kurisu prepares to return to America, while Rintaro and the others delete the original D-Mail from the SERN network. Just after erasing the data, Kurisu returns to the lab to tell him that she loves him, but is cut off as Rintaro shifts back to the Beta World Line. Sometime after getting rid of the PhoneWave, Rintaro receives a call from an alternate Suzuha, telling him she needs his help to prevent World War III.
23	"Open the Steins Gate"; Transliteration: "Kyōkaimenjō no Shutainzu Gēto" (Japanese: 境界面上のシュタインズゲート)	September 7, 2011
Suzuha explains that her mission is to prevent Kurisu's death and enter a World Line known as Steins Gate, in which World War III never happens. Wanting to save Kurisu, Rintaro travels to the past with Suzuha in her time machine, arriving before Kurisu's death. Witnessing events unfold as they did, Rintaro briefly runs into Kurisu, explaining their prior encounter, before hiding in the room where she will be stabbed. There, Kurisu meets with her father, revealed to be Doctor Nakabachi, who attempts to take ownership of her time travel theory for himself. Rintaro attempts to save Kurisu but inadvertently stabs her himself, allowing Nakabachi to escape with her theory to Russia, an event that will lead to a time machine arms race and eventually, World War III. As Rintaro falls into despair and refuses Suzuha's offer of a second attempt, Mayuri slaps him, stating that he was never one to give up on someone or something. Suzuha then reveals that Rintaro was intended to fail the first attempt so that the scrambled video message he received on the day of Kurisu's death could be made viewable. This turns out to be a video from his future self, explaining that the key to saving Kurisu without changing the events that led him to develop the time machine and causing a paradox is to fool his past self into believing Kurisu has died.
24	"Achievement Point"; Transliteration: "Owari to Hajimari no Purorōgu" (Japanese: 終わりと始まりのプロローグ)	September 14, 2011
Picking up a light-up sword to use its liquid as a substitute for Kurisu's blood, Rintaro and Suzuha return to the day of Kurisu's death. To prevent a Metal Upa toy from ending up with Nakabachi's papers (which previously saved them from being destroyed in a fire on the plane flight), Rintaro obtains it himself first from the toy machine so that Mayuri ends up with a plastic one, which would later make its way to Kurisu and Nakabachi. Finding that the liquid in the gadget has dried up, Rintaro provokes Nakabachi into stabbing him, leading Nakabachi to run off in fear with Kurisu's research papers. After knocking Kurisu out with a taser, Rintaro uses his own blood from the stab wound to recreate the scene he originally saw, fooling his past self and sending him on his time-hopping journey. As Rintaro returns to the present, Suzuha gives her thanks before disappearing, as she does not yet exist in the Steins Gate world line. After recovering from his wounds, Rintaro starts giving out badges to the lab members he recruited in other World Lines, saving one for Suzuha, who will arrive into their World Line in seven years. Later, while walking in the streets of Akihabara, Rintaro has a chance encounter with Kurisu, who appears to have retained some memories of the other World Lines.
25 (OVA)	"Egoistic Poriomania"; Transliteration: "Ōkō Bakko no Poriomania" (Japanese: 横行跋扈のポリオマニア)	February 22, 2012
Two months after the main storyline, Rintaro, Daru, Mayuri, and Luka are invited by Faris to come to Los Angeles, where she will participate in a Rai-Net tournament, reuniting with Kurisu upon their arrival. Due to Rintaro's cancellation of Faris's hotel reservations for them as a result of his ego, the group ends up checking into a motel. Later that night, Kurisu talks to Rintaro about the dreams she has had of past World Lines and the romance they shared. After visiting the card tournament Faris had entered, Rintaro spots someone that looks like Suzuha and chases after her, having a conversation in which she mentions that a fortune teller had foretold her having a child in seven years. After the girl leaves, Rintaro discovers that his phone is uncharged and he is almost broke, leading him to make his way back to the city on foot. He is eventually found by Kurisu, who becomes stranded with him after her car runs out of gas. While waiting to be rescued, the two discuss the World Line where they confessed their love for each other, leading Rintaro to make his confession once again.
23β	"Divide by Zero"; Transliteration: "Zero josan" (Japanese: ゼロ除算)	December 2, 2015
An alternate version of episode 23 aired as part of a rerun leading to the release of Steins;Gate 0. After Rintaro comes back from his failed attempt to save Kurisu, Mayuri comforts him, feeling that the burden of changing the future is too much for one person to take. Left in despair over being unable to save Kurisu, Rintaro discards his mad scientist persona and starts living as an ordinary university student. Sometime later, Rintaro meets an A.I. version of Kurisu.

=== Steins;Gate: Sōmei Eichi no Cognitive Computing (2014 ONA)(IBM Promotional Shorts) ===
No.	Title	Original release date
1	"Cooking Chapter"; Transliteration: "Kukkingu-hen" (Japanese: クッキング編)	October 14, 2014
Mayuri and Kurisu attempt to make some fried chicken with help of a cognitive computing-based Upa terminal, only to find they lack the actual ingredients they need. Thus, with Upa's help, they find something they can make with what they have in the lab.
2	"Navigation Chapter"; Transliteration: "Nabigēshon-hen" (Japanese: ナビゲーション編)	October 21, 2014
After Rintaro and Kurisu get into an argument with each other, they both use Upa to try and navigate their way home without bumping into each other. Instead, Upa arranges them to take the long route so they can make up with each other.
3	"Fashion Chapter"; Transliteration: "Fasshon-hen" (Japanese: ファッション編)	November 4, 2014
When it becomes apparent that Rintaro and Daru pretty much wear the same clothes all the time, Kurisu uses Upa to try and come up with some different outfits for them based on their hobbies and personalities.
4	"Meeting Chapter"; Transliteration: "Kaigi-hen" (Japanese: 会議編)	November 11, 2014
Following complaints from Yugo, Upa heads up a meeting concerning a potential new location for the lab, much to Rintaro's dismay.

== See also ==
- Steins;Gate: The Movie − Load Region of Déjà Vu - 2013 anime film sequel to the anime series.
- Steins;Gate 0 - 2018 television anime sequel based on the Steins;Gate 0 sequel game.
