= List of anime series listed among the best =

This is a list of anime series that television critics or magazines have listed as being among the best of all time. The anime series are included on at least three separate best-of lists from different publications (inclusive of all time periods, networks and genres), as chosen by their editorial staff.

== List ==
There are currently 65 anime series in this list.

Anime series	Genre	Release	Studio	Ref.
Anohana	Coming-of-age	2011	A-1 Pictures	(Note: Anohana:)
Attack on Titan	Dark fantasy	2013–2023	Wit Studio, MAPPA	(Note: Attack on Titan:)
Baccano!	Mystery	2007	Brain's Base	(Note: Baccano!:)
Berserk	Dark fantasy	1997–1998	OLM	(Note: Berserk:)
Bleach	Supernatural	2004–2012	Studio Pierrot	(Note: Bleach:)
Chainsaw Man	Dark fantasy	2022	MAPPA	(Note: Chainsaw Man:)
Code Geass	Mecha	2006–2007	Sunrise	(Note: Code Geass:)
Cowboy Bebop	Space Western	1998–1999	Sunrise	(Note: Cowboy Bebop:)
Cyberpunk: Edgerunners	Cyberpunk	2022	Studio Trigger	(Note: Cyberpunk: Edgerunners:)
Death Note	Psychological thriller	2006–2007	Madhouse	(Note: Death Note:)
Demon Slayer: Kimetsu no Yaiba	Dark fantasy	2019–2024	Ufotable	(Note: Demon Slayer: Kimetsu no Yaiba:)
Devilman Crybaby	Dark fantasy	2018	Science Saru	(Note: Devilman Crybaby:)
Dragon Ball	Fantasy comedy	1986–1989	Toei Animation	(Note: Dragon Ball:)
Dragon Ball Z	Fantasy comedy	1989–1996	Toei Animation	(Note: Dragon Ball Z:)
Fate/Zero	Dark fantasy	2011–2012	Ufotable	(Note: Fate/Zero:)
FLCL	Science fiction	2000–2001, 2018, 2023	Gainax, Production I.G	(Note: FLCL:)
Fruits Basket	Supernatural	2019–2021	TMS Entertainment	(Note: Fruits Basket:)
Fullmetal Alchemist	Dark fantasy	2003–2004	Bones	(Note: Fullmetal Alchemist:)
Fullmetal Alchemist: Brotherhood	Dark fantasy	2009–2010	Bones	(Note: Fullmetal Alchemist: Brotherhood:)
Future Diary	Psychological thriller	2011–2012	Asread	(Note: Future Diary:)
Gankutsuou: The Count of Monte Cristo	Science fiction	2004–2005	Gonzo	(Note: Gankutsuou: The Count of Monte Cristo:)
Ghost in the Shell: Stand Alone Complex	Cyberpunk	2002–2005	Production I.G	(Note: Ghost in the Shell: Stand Alone Complex:)
Gintama	Adventure	2006–2018	Sunrise, Bandai Namco Pictures	(Note: Gintama:)
Gurren Lagann	Mecha	2007	Gainax	(Note: Gurren Lagann:)
Haikyu!!	Sports	2014–2020	Production I.G	(Note: Haikyu!!:)
Hajime no Ippo	Sports	2000–2014	Madhouse, MAPPA	(Note: Hajime no Ippo:)
Hunter × Hunter	Fantasy	2011–2014	Madhouse	(Note: Hunter × Hunter:)
Inuyasha	Fantasy	2000–2004	Sunrise	(Note: Inuyasha:)
JoJo's Bizarre Adventure	Adventure	2012–present	David Production	(Note: Jojo's Bizarre Adventure:)
Jujutsu Kaisen	Dark fantasy	2020–present	MAPPA	(Note: Jujutsu Kaisen:)
Kaguya-sama: Love is War	Psychological	2019–2022	A-1 Pictures	(Note: Kaguya-sama: Love is War:)
KonoSuba	Isekai	2016–present	Studio Deen, Drive, ENGI	(Note: KonoSuba:)
Lupin the 3rd	Mystery	1971–1972	Tokyo Movie	(Note: Lupin the 3rd:)
Made in Abyss	Dark fantasy	2017–2022	Kinema Citrus	(Note: Made in Abyss:)
The Melancholy of Haruhi Suzumiya	Science fiction	2006	Kyoto Animation	(Note: The Melancholy of Haruhi Suzumiya:)
Mobile Suit Gundam	Mecha	1979–1980	Sunrise	(Note: Mobile Suit Gundam:)
Mob Psycho 100	Supernatural	2016–2022	Bones	(Note: Mob Psycho 100:)
Monster	Psychological thriller	2004–2005	Madhouse	(Note: Monster:)
Mushishi	Supernatural	2005–2006	Artland	(Note: Mushishi:)
My Hero Academia	Superhero	2016–2025	Bones, Bones Film	(Note: My Hero Academia:)
Naruto	Fantasy comedy	2002–2007	Studio Pierrot	(Note: Naruto:)
Naruto: Shippuden	Fantasy comedy	2007–2017	Studio Pierrot	(Note: Naruto: Shippuden:)
Neon Genesis Evangelion	Mecha	1995–1996	Tatsunoko Production, Gainax	(Note: Neon Genesis Evangelion:)
One Piece	Fantasy comedy	1999–present	Toei Animation	(Note: One Piece:)
One-Punch Man	Superhero	2015–present	Madhouse, J.C.Staff	(Note: One-Punch Man:)
Paranoia Agent	Mystery	2004	Madhouse	(Note: Paranoia Agent:)
Parasyte: The Maxim	Science fiction	2014–2015	Madhouse	(Note: Parasyte: The Maxim:)
Pluto	Science fiction	2023	Studio M2	(Note: Pluto:)
Pokémon	Fantasy comedy	1997–present	OLM	(Note: Pokémon:)
Puella Magi Madoka Magica	Magical girl	2011	Shaft	(Note: Puella Magi Madoka Magica:)
Ranma 1/2	Adventure	1989-1992	Studio Deen	(Note: Ranma 1/2:)
Re:Zero – Starting Life In Another World	Isekai	2016–present	White Fox	(Note: Re:Zero:)
Rurouni Kenshin	Adventure	1996–1998	Gallop, Studio Deen	(Note: Rurouni Kenshin:)
Sailor Moon	Magical girl	1992–1997	Toei Animation	(Note: Sailor Moon:)
Samurai Champloo	Samurai	2004–2005	Manglobe	(Note: Samurai Champloo:)
Serial Experiments Lain	Cyberpunk	1998	Triangle Staff	(Note: Serial Experiments Lain:)
Steins;Gate	Science fiction	2011	White Fox	(Note: Steins;Gate:)
Tokyo Ghoul	Dark fantasy	2014	Studio Pierrot	(Note: Tokyo Ghoul:)
Trigun	Space Western	1998	Madhouse	(Note: Trigun:)
Vinland Saga	Epic	2019–2023	Wit Studio, MAPPA	(Note: Vinland Saga:)
Violet Evergarden	Coming-of-age	2018	Kyoto Animation	(Note: Violet Evergarden:)
The Vision of Escaflowne	Isekai	1996	Sunrise	(Note: The Vision in Escaflowne:)
Your Lie in April	Romantic drama	2014–2015	A-1 Pictures	(Note: Your Lie in April:)
YuYu Hakusho	Supernatural	1992–1995	Studio Pierrot	(Note: YuYu Hakusho:)

== Publications ==
The reference numbers in the notes section show which of the 14 selected publications list the anime series.

- CGMagazine – 2024
- Collider – 2025
- Game Rant – 2024
- TheGamer – 2025
- GamesRadar+ – 2025
- IGN – 2022
- Japan Web Magazine – 2020, 2025
- Looper – 2024
- Men's Health – 2023
- MovieWeb – 2025
- Paste – 2018, 2024
- Rotten Tomatoes – 2020
- Screen Rant – 2026
- The Times of India – 2025

== See also ==
- List of television shows considered the best
- List of films voted the best
- List of video games listed among the best

== Notes ==
The reference numbers show which publications include the anime series.
