= Trina Nishimura =

American voice actress

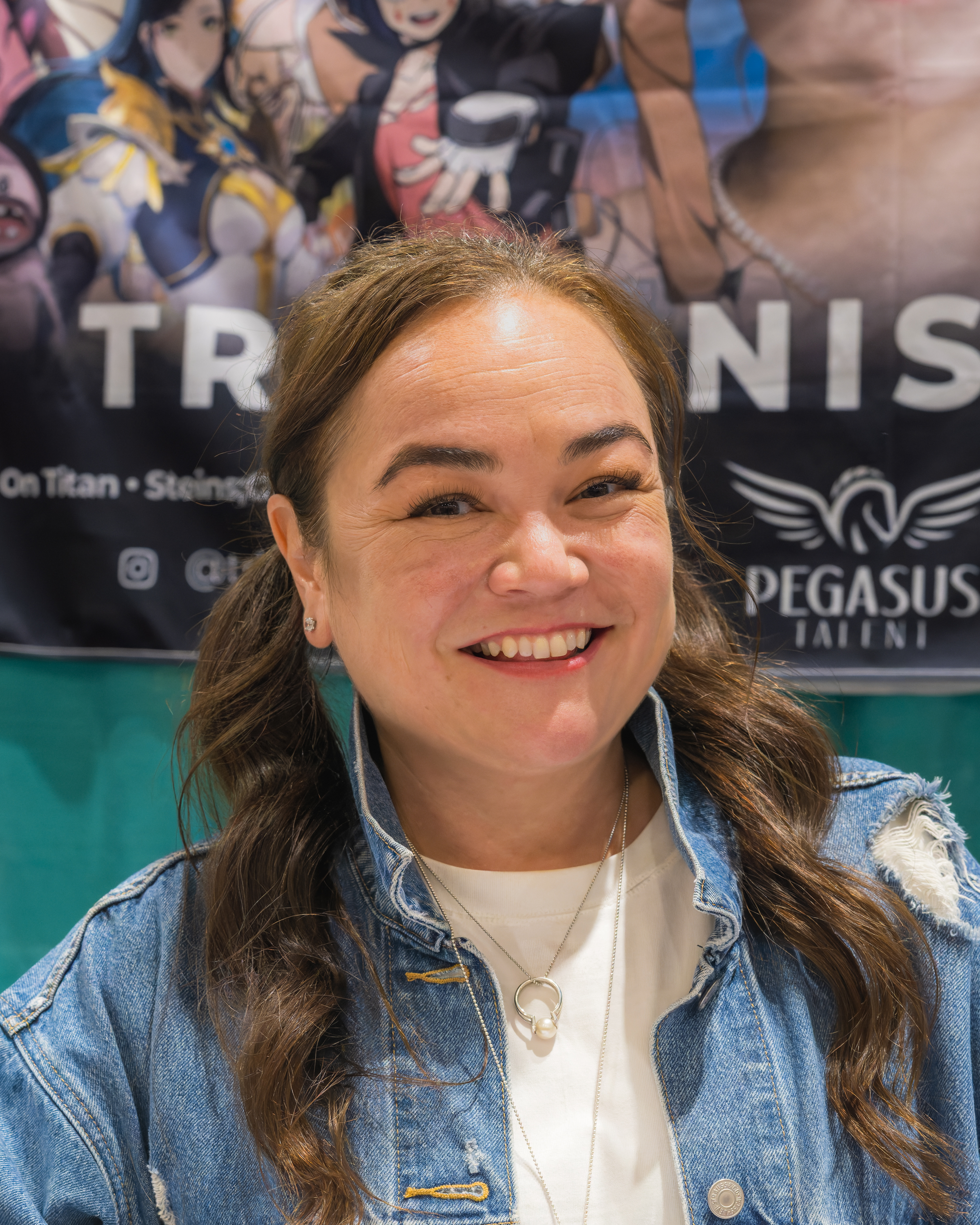
- Nishimura at Animate! Orlando in 2026
- Born: Trina Marie Nishimura; August 8, 1983 (age 43); Sacramento, California, U.S.
- Education: Amarillo High School; University of North Texas
- Occupation: Voice actress
- Years active: 2006–present
- Partner: Justin Holt

Trina Marie Nishimura (born August 8, 1983) is an American voice actress. She is most known for voicing Nadie in El Cazador de la Bruja, Mikasa Ackerman in Attack on Titan, Kyoka Jiro in My Hero Academia, Francesca Lucchini in Strike Witches, Kurisu Makise in Steins;Gate, and Etie in Fire Emblem Engage.

== Early life and career ==
Trina Marie Nishimura was born on August 8, 1983, in Sacramento, California. At age 3, her family moved to Amarillo, Texas, and began doing plays and performing at the community theater at age 9, and continued acting through high school. She graduated from Amarillo High School, and later got her Bachelor of Arts degree at the University of North Texas at Denton. She originally intended to go to law school, but was asked by a friend of hers in Amarillo to try auditioning for Funimation.

Her first voice-acting role was in Desert Punk as Namiko. She voices Nadie in the girls with guns series El Cazador de la Bruja, and Mari Illustrious Makinami in Evangelion: 2.0 You Can (Not) Advance. In the hit-anime Attack on Titan, she voices the lead female character Mikasa Ackerman.

== Personal life ==
Nishimura is in a relationship with Dallas-based chef Justin Holt, who opened a ramen restaurant called Salaryman in September 2019. The restaurant was closed down in November 2020 when Holt was diagnosed with leukemia.

== Filmography ==
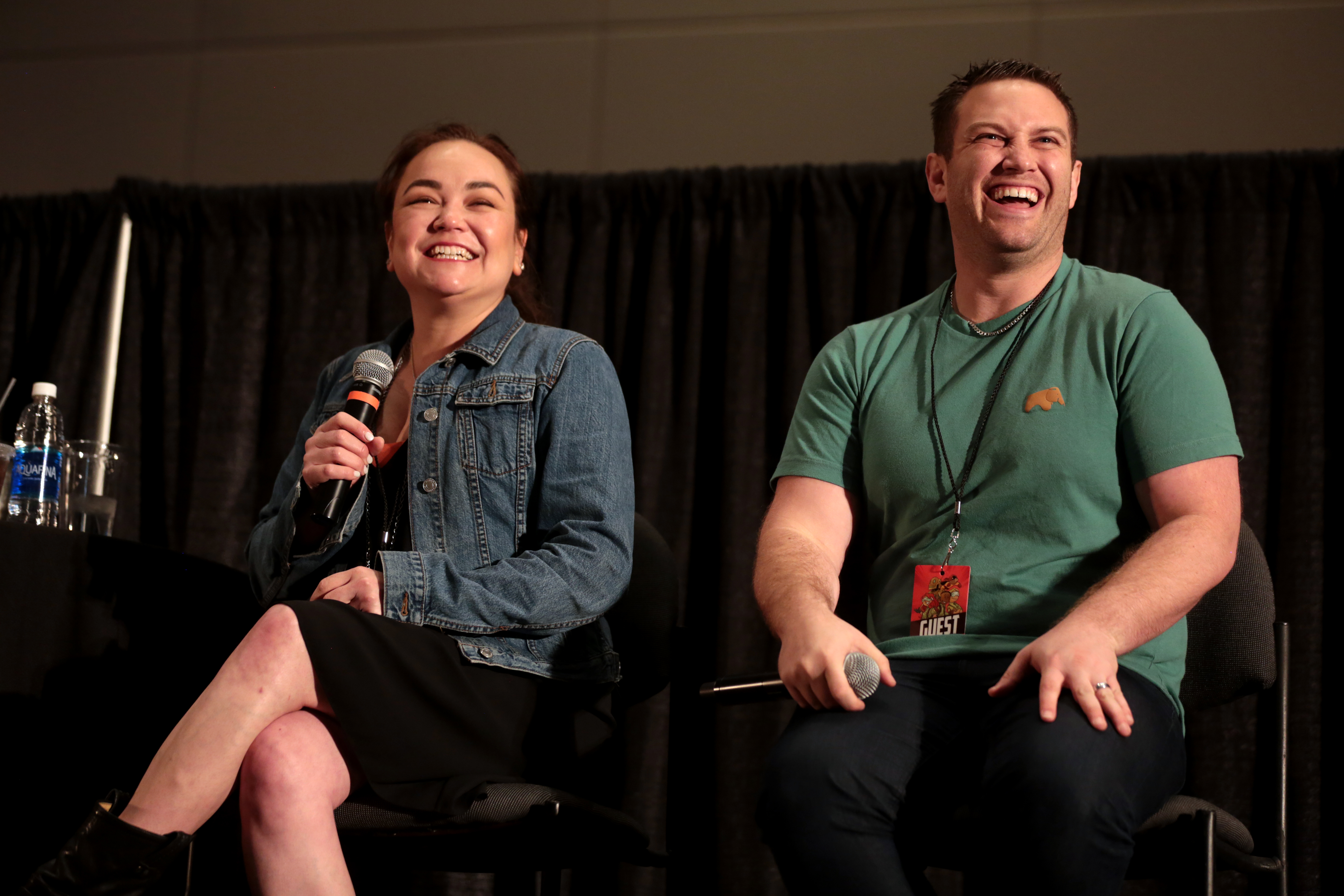
Trina Nishimura and Bryce Papenbrook at a convention panel for Attack on Titan

=== Anime ===
List of dubbing performances in anime
Year	Title	Role	Notes	Source
2006	Desert Punk	Namiko	Debut role	
2006	Black Cat	Tanya		
2006	Negima!	Chao Lingshen, Motsu (Negima!?)	also Negima!?	
2006	Speed Grapher	Yui		
2007	Baccano!	Rachel		
2007	My Bride is a Mermaid	Akeno Shiranui		
2007	School Rumble	Akira Takano		
2007	Witchblade	Shiori Tsuzuki		
2008	Baldr Force EXE Resolution	Tsukina Sasagiri		
2008	Claymore	Flora, Sophia		
2008	Ghost Hunt	Kiyomi Itō	Ep. 7	
2008	Jyu Oh Sei	Tiz		
2008	Sasami: Magical Girls Club	Ayane		
2009	Kaze no Stigma	Madoka	Ep. 17	
2009	Sgt. Frog	Ghost Girl		
2009	The Tower of Druaga series	Kaaya		
2009	Nabari no Ou	Juji Minami		
2009	Blassreiter	Maifong Liu		
2009	Kenichi: The Mightiest Disciple	Shigure Kosaka		
2009	El Cazador de la Bruja	Nadie		
2009–2020	A Certain Scientific Railgun	Mii Konori		
2010	Bamboo Blade	Karen Nishiyama		
2010	Birdy the Mighty: Decode	Capella Titis		
2010	Casshern Sins	Luna		
2010	Fullmetal Alchemist: Brotherhood	Lan Fan		
2010	Oh! Edo Rocket	O-Riku		
2010	Sands of Destruction	Lia Dragonell		
2010	Soul Eater	Mizune		
2010	Strike Witches series	Francesca Lucchini		
2011	Baka and Test series	Aiko Kudo		
2011	Chrome Shelled Regios	Shante Laite		
2011	Ga-Rei: Zero	Kiri Nikaido		
2011	Heaven's Lost Property series	Sohara Mitsuki		
2011	Rideback	Suzuri Uchida		
2011	The Sacred Blacksmith	Margot		
2012	.hack//Quantum	Sakuya		
2012	Fairy Tail	Sherry Blendy		
2012	Okami-san and Her Seven Companions	Satsuki Shirayuki	Eps. 9-10	
2012	Freezing	Tris McKenzie		
2012	Shangri-La	Klaris Lutz		
2012	Steins;Gate	Kurisu Makise	also Steins;Gate 0	
2013	Eureka Seven: AO	Lerato Food		
2013	Tenchi Muyo! War on Geminar	Jozzy		
2014–2024	Attack on Titan	Mikasa Ackerman	4 seasons, also Attack on Titan: Junior High	
2014	Ben-To	Sen Yarizui		
2014	Senran Kagura	Yomi		
2014	Space Dandy	Mamitas	Ep. 3	
2015	Death Parade	Machiko	Eps. 1-2	
2015	Blood Blockade Battlefront	Chain Sumeragi		
2015	Mikagura School Suite	Asuhi Imizu		
2015	The Rolling Girls	Yukari Otonashi		
2015	World Break: Aria of Curse for a Holy Swordsman	Tokiko Kanzaki		
2015	Ninja Slayer From Animation	Nancy Lee		
2015	Ultimate Otaku Teacher	Yoko	Eps. 1-2	
2015	Tokyo Ghoul series	Misato Gori		
2015	Seraph of the End	Mito Jujo		
2016	Tokyo ESP	Lin Lianjie		
2016–present	Date A Live	Ellen Mira Mathers		
2016	Rage of Bahamut: Genesis	Uriel		
2016	Dimension W	Miyabi Azumaya		
2016	Three Leaves, Three Colors	Sei Osakabe		
2016–2025	My Hero Academia	Kyoka Jiro / Earphone Jack		
2016	And You Thought There Is Never a Girl Online?	Ako Tamaki		
2016	Puzzle & Dragons X	Eldora		
2016	Handa-kun	Sawako Tennōji		
2016	Monster Hunter Stories: Ride On	Navirou		
2016	Yuri on Ice	Kenjiro Minami		
2017	Hand Shakers	Masaru Hojo		
2017	One Piece	Wadatsumi		
2017	KanColle: Kantai Collection	Kirishima		
2017–present	Classroom of the Elite	Arisu Sakayanagi		
2017	Hyouka	Onodera	Eps. 12-13	
2017	Dies Irae	Rea Himuro		
2017	Anime-Gataris	Bei Bei Yang		
2017	Garo: Vanishing Line	Gina		
2017	Code: Realize − Guardian of Rebirth	Delacroix II		
2018	Yamada-kun and the Seven Witches	Rin Sasaki	Eps. 1-2, 10	
2018	Pop Team Epic	Popuko	Ep. 2A	
2018	Cardcaptor Sakura: Clear Card	Meiling Li		
2018	Junji Ito Collection	Jean-Pierre	Ep. 4	
2018	Katana Maidens ~ Toji No Miko	Yukina Takatsu		
2018	Black Clover	Sally		
2018	Hakyu Hoshin Engi	Ryukitsu Koshu	Ep. 7	
2018	Steins;Gate 0	Kurisu Makise		
2019	Magical Girl Spec-Ops Asuka	Asuka Ohtorii		
2019	Radiant	Hameline		
2019	Endro!	Mather "Mei" Enderstto		
2019	Boogiepop and Others	Minako Yurihara	2 episodes	
2019–2021	Fruits Basket	Akito Soma (young)	2019 reboot	
2020	Deca-Dence	Natsume		
2021	Restaurant to Another World	Hilda		
2023	Saving 80,000 Gold in Another World for My Retirement	Mitsuha		
2023	The Aristocrat's Otherworldly Adventure: Serving Gods Who Go Too Far	Cain/Kazuya		
2023	Dead Mount Death Play	Kazuki Shinoyama		
2023	Sweet Reincarnation	Pas		
2023	Reborn as a Vending Machine, I Now Wander the Dungeon	Pel		
2023–2025	The Apothecary Diaries	Lihua	8 episodes	
2024–2026	Frieren: Beyond Journey's End	Ehre	6 episodes	
2024	Viral Hit	Ga Eul		
2024	You Are Ms. Servant	Yuki		
2025	Solo Leveling	Park Hee-jin	Season 2; 4 episodes	
2025	Gachiakuta	Remlin Tysark		
2025	Let This Grieving Soul Retire!	Liz		
2026	Takopi's Original Sin	Marina's Mom		
2026	Overgeared	Takumi's Mom		

=== Film ===
List of dubbing performances in feature films
Year	Title	Role	Notes	Source
2011	Trigun: Badlands Rumble	Milly Thompson		
2011	Evangelion: 2.0 You Can (Not) Advance	Mari Illustrious Makinami	limited theatrical release	
2013	Evangelion: 3.0 You Can (Not) Redo	Mari Illustrious Makinami	limited theatrical and convention release	
2015	Ghost in the Shell: The New Movie	Chris		
2016	Attack on Titan	Mikasa Ackerman		
2016	Strike Witches Movie	Francesca Lucchini		
2016	Rurouni Kenshin	Megumi Takani		
2016	Godzilla Resurgence	Kayoco Anne Patterson		
2017	Rurouni Kenshin: Kyoto Inferno	Megumi Takani		
2017	Rurouni Kenshin: The Legend Ends	Megumi Takani		
2017	Steins;Gate: The Movie − Load Region of Déjà Vu	Makise Kurisu		
2018	My Hero Academia: Two Heroes	Kyoka Jiro	limited theatrical release	
2019	Star Blazers: Space Battleship Yamato 2202	Kiryu Mikage		
2020	My Hero Academia: Heroes Rising	Kyoka Jiro	limited theatrical release	
2021	My Hero Academia: World Heroes' Mission	Kyoka Jiro	limited theatrical release	
2024	My Hero Academia: You're Next	Kyoka Jiro	limited theatrical release	

List of dubbing performances in direct-to-video and television films
Year	Title	Role	Notes	Source
2009	Case Closed – Movie: The Last Wizard of the Century	Natasha Kousaka		
2011	Trigun: Badlands Rumble	Milly Thompson		
2012	Tales of Vesperia: The First Strike	Hisca Aiheap		

=== Other voice-over roles ===
List of voice performances in other media
Year	Title	Role	Notes	Source
2012	EvaNavi San Francisco audio tour guide	Mari	iPhone app associated with J-pop Summit Festival 2012	
2019	Borderlands 3	Double Dee Seven, Naoko	Video Game	
2020	My Hero One's Justice 2	Kyoka Jiro	Video game	
2022	Phantom Breaker: Omnia	Kurisu Makise	Video game	
2023	Fire Emblem Engage	Etie	Video game	
2023	Anonymous;Code	[Kurisu]	Visual Novel	
