= J. Michael Tatum =

American voice actor

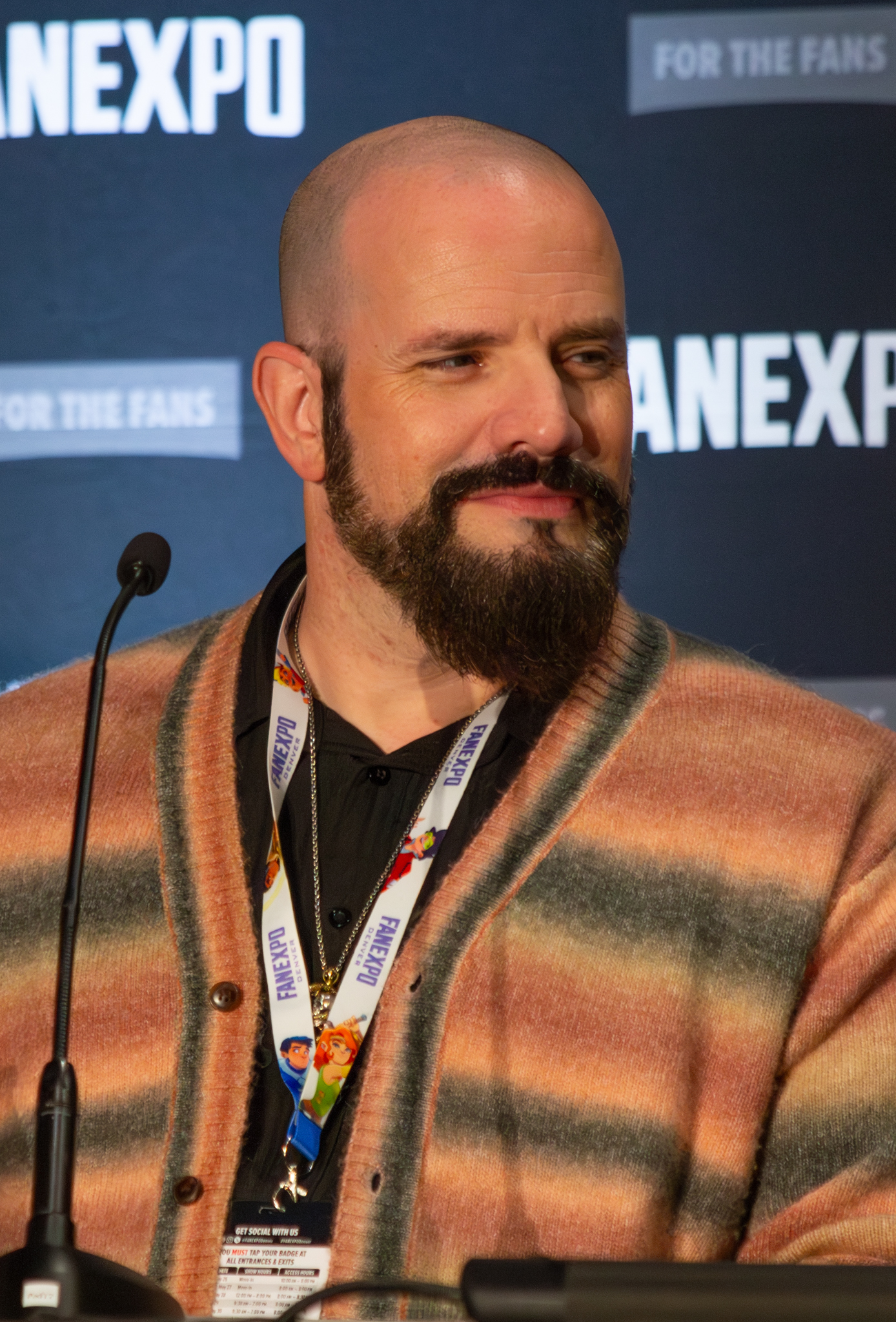
- Tatum in 2026
- Born: John Michael Tatum
- Occupations: Voice actor; ADR director; ADR script writer
- Years active: 2004–present
- Spouse: Brandon McInnis

John Michael Tatum is an American voice actor, ADR director and script writer who provides voices for a number of English versions of Japanese anime series and video games.

== Biography ==
In 2005, Tatum ran into Funimation ADR director Christopher Bevins, who cast him as Rikichi in Samurai 7. Tatum has been cast in several notable roles, including Kyoya Ootori in Ouran High School Host Club, Sebastian Michaelis in Black Butler, Tomoe in Kamisama Kiss, France in Hetalia: Axis Powers, Erwin Smith in Attack on Titan, Okabe Rintaro in Steins;Gate, Eneru in One Piece, Tenya Iida in My Hero Academia and Rei Ryuugazaki in Free! – Eternal Summer.

From January 2010 to January 2014, he hosted That Anime Show podcasts with friend and co-worker Terri Doty and ADR Engineer Stephen Hoff.

At the Florida Supercon 2015 panel, when he was asked what was his inspiration to go into voice acting, Tatum said that when he was young he had a speech impediment and his speech coach had him get involved in theater. As he was reciting and memorizing scripts, they noticed that his stuttering started to gradually disappear. He then got into drama and theater acting, and that voice acting is great in that it enables him to play more characters than on camera.

In 2017, Tatum was cast for the English voice of Hideki Akasaka in Shin Godzilla.

Since October 2018, he and Jamie Marchi co-host the ghost story podcast Ghoul Intentions.

== Personal life ==
Tatum is openly gay. During a panel at Ichibancon 2014, he had said that he came out to his family during his college years, with his father having already known about his sexuality for some time. On October 16, 2018, he became engaged to his long-time partner and fellow voice actor Brandon McInnis in Paris. He resides in Los Angeles, California as of 2020.

== Filmography ==
=== Anime ===
List of voice performances in anime
Year	Title	Role	Crew role, notes	Source
2005	Samurai 7	Rikichi		CA
2005–2006	Tsubasa: Reservoir Chronicle	Seishiro Sakurazuka		
2006	Speed Grapher	Katsuya Shirogane		CA
2006	xxxHolic	Shizuka Dōmeki		CA
2006	D.Gray-man	Komui Lee		CA
2006	Trinity Blood	Süleyman		CA
2006	Rumbling Hearts	Kisho		CA
2007	Beck: Mongolian Chop Squad	Jim Walsh		CA
2007	Mushi-Shi	Taku		CA
2007	School Rumble	Hiroyoshi Aso		CA
2007	Glass Fleet	Various		CA
2008	Rosario + Vampire	Issa Shuzen		
2008	Dragon Ball Z	Spice	Remastered Funimation dub	
2008	Shuffle!	Masanori Takizawa, Yamaguchi		CA
2008	Sasami: Magical Girls Club	Amitav		CA
2008	One Piece	Eneru	Funimation dub	
2008	Ouran High School Host Club	Kyoya Ootori	Assistant ADR Director	
2009	Baccano!	Isaac Dian		
2009	Shigurui	Seigen Irako		
2009	Phantom: Requiem for the Phantom	Raymond McGuire		
2009	Romeo x Juliet	William de Farnase	ADR Director	
2009	Sgt. Frog	Dororo		
2009	Tsubasa: Reservoir Chronicle: Spring Thunder	Seishiro Sakurazuka		
2009–present	Spice and Wolf	Kraft Lawrence	Also in Spice and Wolf: Merchant Meets the Wise Wolf	CA
2010	Soul Eater	Giriko		
2010	Rin ~ Daughters of Mnemosyne	Ihika		
2010	Fullmetal Alchemist: Brotherhood	Scar	Replacing Dameon Clarke	
2010	Dragon Ball Z Kai	Zarbon, Guide, Musuka, Upa, Bora		CA
2010	Shiki	Seishirou Kirishiki		
2010	Hetalia: Axis Powers	France		
2010	Eden of the East	Kazuomi Hirasawa		
2010	Corpse Princess	Keisei Tagami	ADR Director	
2010	Pokémon the Series: Diamond and Pearl	Tobias		Tweet
2010	Birdy the Mighty: Decode	Tuto		
2010–2011	Initial D	Ryosuke Takahashi	Funimation dub	
2011	Chrome Shelled Regios	Gorneo Luckens		
2011	Hero Tales	Shokaku		
2011	Dance in the Vampire Bund	Alphonse Medici Borgiani	As John Knell	
2011	Rideback	Ryunosuke Kataoka		
2011	Chaos;Head	Kouzou		
2011–2025	Black Butler	Sebastian Michaelis		
2012	.hack//Quantum	Smith		
2012	Shangri-La	Shogo		
2012	Steins;Gate	Rintaro Okabe	ADR Script	
2012	Deadman Wonderland	Nagi Kengamine		Resume
2012	Fairy Tail	Acnologia, Simon		
2012	Panty & Stocking with Garterbelt	Portschach, Sam		
2013	Toriko	Jelly Boy		
2013	Future Diary	Masumi Nishijima	Lead Writer	
2013	Last Exile: Fam, the Silver Wing	Geeth, Rakesh		
2014	Space Dandy	Dr. Gel		
2014	Karneval	Tsukitachi		
2014	Date A Live series	Kyōhei Kannazuki		
2014	Code:Breaker	Masaomi Heike		
2014	A Certain Scientific Railgun S	Haruki Aritomi		
2014–2015	Kamisama Kiss series	Tomoe		
2014–2019, 2023	Attack on Titan	Erwin Smith	ADR Script (seasons 1–2)	
2015	Assassination Classroom	Shiro	ADR Script	
2015	Tokyo Ghoul series	Shuu Tsukiyama	Assistant ADR Director	
2015	Yurikuma Arashi	Life Sexy		
2015	Tokyo Ravens	Jin Ohtomo		
2015	D-Frag!	Ataru Kawahara, Young Ataru		
2015	Blood Blockade Battlefront	Steven A. Starphase		
2015	Nobunagun	St. Germain		
2015	Free! - Iwatobi Swim Club series	Rei Ryugazaki	ADR Script	
2015	Dance with Devils	Nesta		CA
2015	Daimidaler the Sound Robot	Kazuo Matayoshi		
2015	Michiko & Hatchin	Gino Costa	Episode: "The Chocolate Girl in Love"	
2016	Danganronpa: The Animation	Jin Kirigiri	ADR Writer; Also The End of Hope Peak's High School	
2016	Prince of Stride: Alternative	Yūjirō Dan		
2016	Divine Gate	Arthur		
2016	Dimension W	Loser		
2016	Brothers Conflict	Masaomi Asahina		
2016	Monster Hunter Stories: Ride On	Cryo		
2016	91 Days	Tetsta Lagusa	Ep. 1 ADR Script Writer	
2016	Joker Game	Jean Victoire		
2016	Trickster	Ryo Inoue		
2016	Nanbaka	Kiji Mitsuba		
2016	Show By Rock#	Orion		
2016	Drifters	Butch Cassidy		
2016	Chaos Dragon	Black Dragon		
2016	Yuri on Ice	Michele Crispino		
2016–2025	My Hero Academia	Tenya Iida		
2016–2025	Touken Ranbu: Hanamaru series	Souza Samonji		
2017	ACCA: 13-Territory Inspection Dept.	Warbler	Ep. 4	
2017	Chain Chronicle: The Light of Haecceitas	Burckhardt		
2017	Code: Realize − Guardian of Rebirth	Arsène Lupin		
2017	Love Tyrant	Maou		
2017	Alice & Zoroku	Sawaki	Ep. 1	
2017	KADO - The Right Answer	Narrator		
2017	Sakura Quest	Noge		
2017	Code Geass: Akito the Exiled	Ioan Malcal		
2017	Samurai Warriors	Nobuyuki Sanada		
2017	18if	Katsumi Kanzaki		
2017	Restaurant to Another World	Heinrich Seeleman		
2017–2026	Saga of Tanya the Evil	Erich Von Rerugen		
2017–present	Black Clover	Fuegoleon Vermillion		
2018	Pop Team Epic	Pipimi	Ep. 5b	
2018	Legend of the Galactic Heroes: Die Neue These	Paul von Oberstein		
2018	Steins;Gate 0	Rintaro Okabe		
2018	Kakuriyo: Bed and Breakfast for Spirits	Tannosuke		
2018	Chio's School Road	Businessman on Bridge		
2019	Dragon Ball Super	Tupper, Za Priccio		
2019	Dr. STONE	Magma		
2019	African Office Worker	Caracal		
2019	Isekai Quartet	Erich Von Rerugen		
2019	Wise Man's Grandchild	Oliver Schtrom/Oliveira von Schtradius		
2019	Actors: Songs Connection	Odawara		
2019	Radiant	Lord de Gulis		
2020	A Certain Scientific Railgun T	Anti-Skill Officer	Ep. 11	
2020	Plunderer	Freidkam Von Lightning	Episode: "Rain"	
2021	Kuroko's Basketball	Katsunori Harazawa		
2021	Sleepy Princess in the Demon Castle	Great Red Siberian		
2021	Wonder Egg Priority	Drool		
2021	Full Dive		ADR Script Writer	
2021	Fruits Basket	Katsuya Honda	2019 reboot	
2021	Dragon Goes House-Hunting	Godfrey		
2021	Magatsu Wahrheit Zuerst	Radboud		
2021	Moriarty the Patriot	Mycroft Holmes		
2021	Vinland Saga	Willibald	Netflix dub	
2021	The Seven Deadly Sins: Dragon's Judgement	Demon King Zeldris		
2021	Cells at Work!	M Cell		
2021	King's Raid: Successors of the Will	Dominix		
2021	Life Lessons with Uramichi Oniisan	Amon	also President (Ep. 9) and Sayuri	
2022	Requiem of the Rose King	Duke of York		
2022	The Case Study of Vanitas	Jean-Jacques Chastel		
2022	Life with an Ordinary Guy Who Reincarnated into a Total Fantasy Knockout	Tsukasa Jinguuji		
2022	Given	Ugetsu Murata		
2022	RWBY: Ice Queendom	Klein Sieben		
2023–2025	Record Of Ragnarok	Hades	Seasons 2–3	
2024	Demon Slayer: Kimetsu no Yaiba	Kasugai Crow of Kagaya Ubuyashiki	Episode: "To Defeat Muzan Kibutsuji"	
2024	Ranma ½	Soun Tendo	2024 remake	
2024	Solo Leveling	Borgon Radiru		
2025	Disney Twisted-Wonderland	Dire Crowley		
2026	MF Ghost	Ryosuke Takahashi	Sequel series to Initial D	

=== Animation ===
List of voice performances in animation
Year	Title	Role	Crew role, notes	Source
2016–2017; 2020–present	RWBY	Klein Sieben	Volumes 4, 8	
2018; 2021	RWBY Chibi	Klein Sieben	Season 3–4	
2025	The Mighty Nein	Various voices		
2026	Far-Fetched	Quinn Huckley		

=== Films ===
List of voice performances in direct-to-video, feature and television films
Year	Title	Role	Crew role, notes	Source
2006	Tsubasa Reservoir Chronicle the Movie: The Princess in the Birdcage Kingdom	Aide		
2011	Evangelion: 2.0 You Can (Not) Advance	Ryoji Kaji		
2011	Summer Wars	Wabisuke Jinnouchi		
2011–12	Eden of the East films	Kazuomi Hirasawa		
2012	Dragon Age: Dawn of the Seeker	Regalyan D'Marcall		Resume
2012	Mass Effect: Paragon Lost		ADR Script	
2012	Pokémon the Movie: Black—Victini and Reshiram and White—Victini and Zekrom	Damon		Resume
2013	Shakugan no Shana: The Movie	Friagne		
2016	The Empire of Corpses	Frederick Burnaby		
2016	Rurouni Kenshin trilogy	Kanryū Takeda	Live-action dub	
2017	Steins;Gate: The Movie − Load Region of Déjà Vu	Rintaro Okabe		
2017	Fairy Tail: Dragon Cry	Acnologia		
2017	Shin Godzilla	Hideki Akasaka	Funimation dub	
2018	My Hero Academia: Two Heroes	Tenya Iida	Limited theatrical release	
2020	My Hero Academia: Heroes Rising	Tenya Iida	Limited theatrical release	
2022	Fruits Basket: Prelude	Katsuya Honda	Limited theatrical release	
2023	Justice League x RWBY: Super Heroes & Huntsmen, Part Two	Klein Sieben	Direct-to-Video	
2025	The Rose of Versailles	General Jarjayes		

=== Video games ===
List of voice performances in video games
Year	Title	Role	Crew role, Notes	Source
2010–present	Dragon Ball series	Zarbon, Mira, Upa, Bora	Zarbon from 2010–2011	
2012	Borderlands 2	Hodunk Bandit, Sir Hammerlock		
2012	Tales of Xillia 2	Julius Will Kresnik		
2014	Smite	Hercules, Stargazer Anubis, Lord Slashington the III Fenrir		
2014	Borderlands: The Pre-Sequel!	Sir Hammerlock, Lost Legion Infantry No. 4, Powersuit Pro		
2015	Paladins	Fernando		
2016	Killing Floor 2	Mr. Foster		
2019	Borderlands 3	Sir Hammerlock		
2021	Tales of Luminaria	August Wallenstein		
2022	Genshin Impact	Pantalone		
2022	Pokémon Masters EX	Emmet		
2023	Fire Emblem Engage	Louis		
2023	Star Wars Jedi: Survivor	Moran		
2023	Starfield	Henry Filburn, Marcel Duris		
2023	Disgaea 7: Vows of the Virtueless	Joe Doe		
2024	Final Fantasy VII Rebirth	Cid Highwind		
2025	Rune Factory: Guardians of Azuma	Kurama		
2025	Date Everything!	Mitchell Linn		
2025	Deadpool VR	Golden Age Deadpool		
2026	Code Vein II	Protagonist		
2027	Final Fantasy VII Revelation	Cid Highwind		
