= Steins;Gate (TV series) =

Japanese anime television series

- Cover art for the UK home media release, featuring the main cast
- Type: TV series
- Genre: Psychological thriller; Science fiction
- Based on: Steins;Gate by 5pb and Nitroplus
- Directed by: Hiroshi Hamasaki; Takuya Satō; Tomoki Kobayashi (OVA)
- Series composition: Jukki Hanada; Supervised by: (Note: Scenario supervisor (シナリオ監修)); Naotaka Hayashi; Tatsuya Matsubara
- Music by: Jun Murakami; Takeshi Abo
- Voices of: Mamoru Miyano; Asami Imai; Kana Hanazawa; Tomokazu Seki
- Opening theme: "Hacking to the Gate" by Kanako Itō
- No. of episodes: 24 (Note: Twenty-four episodes, plus an alternative version of episode 23 titled "23β", plus one OVA.) (list of episodes)

Production
- Studio: White Fox
- Producers: Kenjirō Gomi; Takayuki Matsunaga; Yoshito Danno; Shinsaku Tanaka; Kozue Kananiwa; Yoshinao Doi

Original release
- Networks: AT-X, CTC, Sun TV, TV Aichi, TV Saitama, tvk, Tokyo MX
- Release: April 6 – September 14, 2011

Related
- Original net animation

Steins;Gate: Sōmei Eichi no Cognitive Computing
- Directed by: Kenichi Kawamura (Note: Credited under the pen name Kenichirou Murakawa (村川健一郎).)
- Written by: Naotaka Hayashi; Supervised by: Tatsuya Matsubara
- Studio: White Fox
- Released: October 14, 2014 – November 11, 2014
- Episodes: 4
- Other anime
- Steins;Gate: The Movie − Load Region of Déjà Vu; Steins;Gate 0

Steins;Gate is a Japanese anime television series produced by White Fox, based on 5pb. and Nitroplus's 2009 visual novel of the same name. The series aired for 24 episodes, from April to September 2011. It is set in 2010 and follows 18-year-old Rintaro Okabe, who, together with his friends, accidentally discovers a method of time travel through which they can send text messages to the past, thereby changing the present.

It is part of the Science Adventure franchise along with Chaos;Head and Robotics;Notes. The series was directed by Hiroshi Hamasaki and Takuya Satō, and written by Jukki Hanada, with character design and animation direction by Kyuuta Sakai, and music by Takeshi Abo.

Steins;Gate received critical acclaim, praised for its character development, themes of time travel and human nature, and its portrayal of post-traumatic stress disorder (PTSD). It is widely considered to be one of the best anime series of all time by critics and fans alike. The series has spawned one original video animation (OVA) episode, four original net animation (ONA) episodes, and a follow-up film. A sequel anime adaptation titled Steins;Gate 0, based on the 2015 visual novel of the same name, premiered in 2018.

== Plot ==
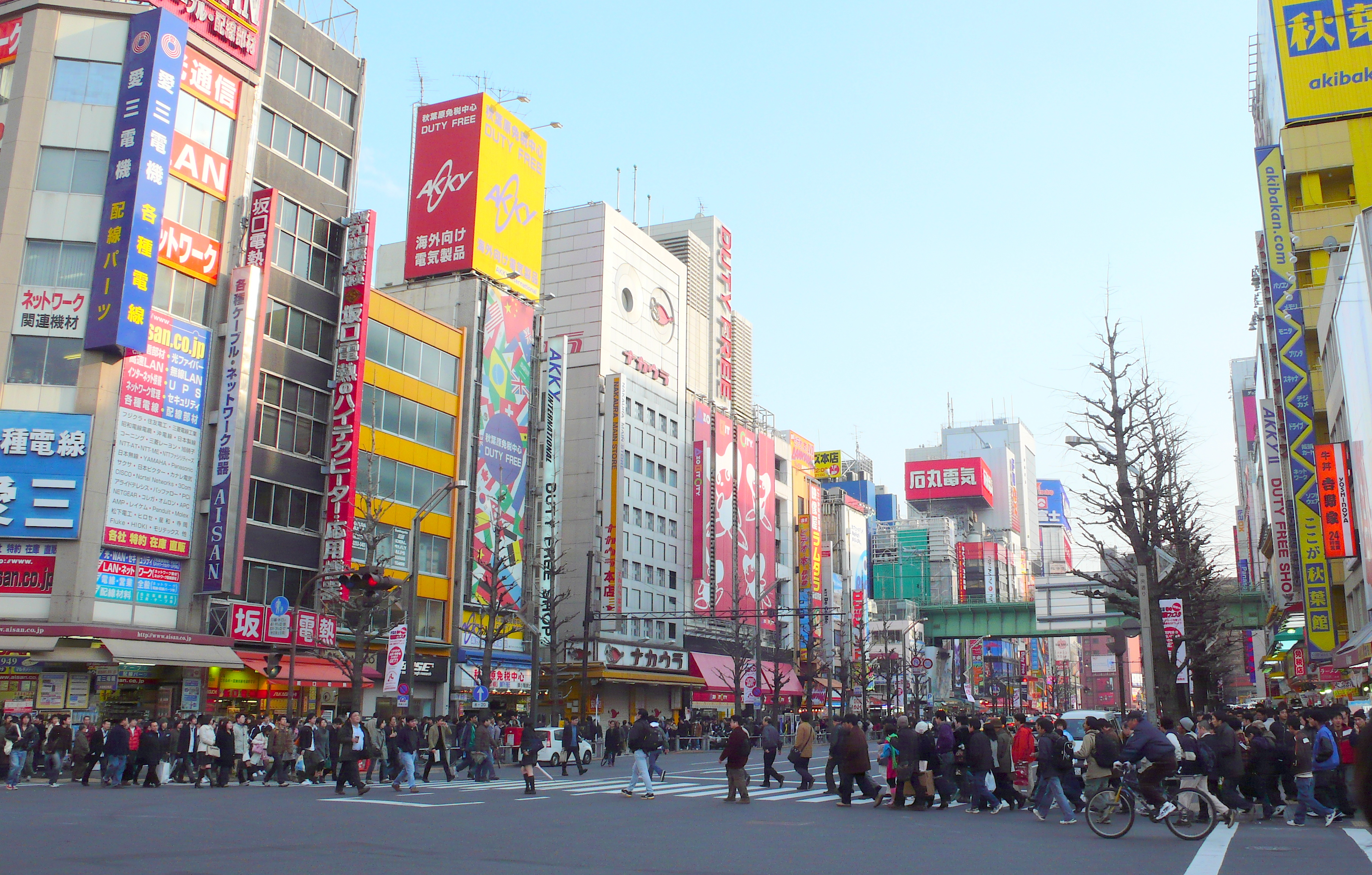
Steins;Gate is set in the Akihabara neighborhood of Tokyo.

Steins;Gate is an adaptation of the visual novel of the same name. It is set in 2010 in Akihabara, Tokyo, and each segment takes place in a different "worldline", which represent different alternate realities that split off from each other when a specific event, known as a convergence point, occurs.

The show follows Rintaro Okabe, a self-proclaimed "mad scientist", who runs the "Future Gadget Laboratory" in his apartment together with his friends Mayuri Shiina and Itaru "Daru" Hashida. While attending a conference about time travel, Okabe finds the dead body of Kurisu Makise, a neuroscience researcher; he sends a text message about it to Daru and later discovers that Kurisu is alive and that the message arrived before he sent it. The laboratory members learn that the cell phone-operated microwave oven they are developing can send text messages back in time; they are joined by Kurisu, and investigate it, sending text messages – named "D-mails" by the group – to the past to change the present. Kurisu eventually creates a device that can send memories through the microwave oven, effectively allowing the user to time travel.

A malevolent organization called SERN (based on the real life CERN) learns of the time machine and sends its people to the laboratory to retrieve it, killing Mayuri in the process. Okabe goes back in time multiple times to prevent Mayuri's death but fails each time. He learns that he needs to undo all the changes their D-mails have caused and does so until he realizes that undoing the first D-mail would return him to the timeline where Kurisu was found dead.

Kurisu pleads that Okabe save Mayuri, after which they confess their romantic feelings for each other and share a kiss. Daru hacks into SERN's database, and they delete the record of the D-mail, returning them to the original timeline. Later, Suzuha Amane, Daru's future daughter, arrives in a time machine to tell Okabe that the only way to prevent a time-travel arms race leading to World War III is to prevent Kurisu's father Nakabachi from killing her and stealing her time travel theories. Suzuha and Okabe travel back in time, but Okabe accidentally kills Kurisu himself. Returning to the present, Okabe receives a message from his future self telling him that to escape the current timeline, he needs to save Kurisu while recreating the vision of the dead Kurisu that his past self saw. Traveling back in time again, he provokes Nakabachi into stabbing him, knocks Kurisu unconscious, and puts her in a pool of his blood for his past self to see, causing the timeline to diverge into one where Kurisu lives and World War III does not occur. Okabe and Kurisu eventually reunite during a chance encounter on the streets of Akihabara.

== Cast ==
Character
Character	Japanese	English
Rintaro Okabe	Mamoru Miyano	J. Michael Tatum
Kurisu Makise	Asami Imai	Trina Nishimura
Mayuri Shiina	Kana Hanazawa	Ashly Burch
Itaru "Daru" Hashida	Tomokazu Seki	Tyson Rinehart
Suzuha Amane	Yukari Tamura	Cherami Leigh
Moeka Kiryu	Saori Gotō	Jessica Cavanagh
Ruka Urushibara	Yū Kobayashi	Lindsay Seidel
Akiha Rumiho (Faris NyanNyan)	Haruko Momoi	Jad Saxton
Yugo "Mr. Braun" Tennouji	Masaki Terasoma	Christopher Sabat
Nae Tennouji	Ayano Yamamoto	Brina Palencia
John Titor	Hiroshi Tsuchida	Patrick Seitz

== Production ==
An anime adaptation of the 2009 visual novel Steins;Gate, the second game in the Science Adventure series, was announced in July 2010 by Chiyomaru Shikura, then-chairman of 5pb. The series was animated by White Fox, produced by Mika Nomura and Yoshinao Doi, directed by Hiroshi Hamasaki and Takuya Satō, and written by Jukki Hanada, with Kyuuta Sakai serving as character designer and chief animation director.

While Takeshi Abo, the composer for the Science Adventure games, only had a small role in the anime adaptation of Chaos;Head, the first game in the series, he was appointed to compose for the Steins;Gate anime together with his co-worker Jun Murakami. Abo composed new music, and made use of the same atmosphere and musical worldview as when he composed for the Steins;Gate game, but also had to consider that the music had to be synchronized with the motions of the anime; this was a very different way of working than the one he was used to when composing for games.

The television series received an anime-original film sequel, Steins;Gate: The Movie − Load Region of Déjà Vu, which premiered on April 20, 2013, and an anime adaptation of Steins;Gate 0, a sequel game, premiered in 2018. Footage from the Steins;Gate anime is used in the 2018 game Steins;Gate Elite – a fully animated, updated version of the original Steins;Gate game – along with new animation by White Fox.

== Release ==
The series aired for 24 episodes from April 6 to September 14, 2011, and was released on DVD and Blu-ray in nine volumes from June 22, 2011, to February 22, 2012, in Japan; the ninth and final volume included a 25th "special episode"/original video animation (OVA) not included in the broadcast, titled "Egoistic Poriomania". For the series' rebroadcast in 2015, an alternate version of episode 23 where Okabe does not save Kurisu was aired to promote the Steins;Gate game's sequel Steins;Gate 0. Steins;Gate: Sōmei Eichi no Cognitive Computing, a series of four original net animation shorts based on the series focusing on how computers could improve people's lives in the future, was made in a collaboration with IBM following a discussion between Shikura and representatives from IBM Japan. The episodes were released from October to November 2014 on IBM's Mugendai website in Japanese, and on IBM Japan's YouTube channel in Japanese with English subtitles.

Outside Japan, the series was distributed by different companies. Crunchyroll simulcast the series in North and South America, Scandinavia, the Netherlands, the Middle East, and Africa; Anime on Demand did the same in the United Kingdom. Funimation later acquired the license for the North American release, produced an English dub, and released the series on DVD and Blu-ray in two volumes in 2012. Madman Entertainment acquired the license for the Australian release, and streamed the series on their website. Manga Entertainment waited to acquire the license for the United Kingdom release until Funimation had completed the English dub, and released it in two volumes on DVD and Blu-ray in 2013.

== Reception ==
=== Critical response ===
Steins;Gate was met with critical acclaim upon release, with praise being given to its writing, story, character development, and visuals. It holds a 100% rating on review aggregator Rotten Tomatoes, based on 6 reviews. Carlo Santos of Anime News Network called it "one of the most addictive sci-fi thrillers in recent anime history", Richard Eisenbeis of Kotaku stated that it was one of the best anime he had seen, and Chris Beveridge of The Fandom Post named it his favorite simulcast title of 2011. Santos enjoyed how Steins;Gate misleads the viewer by spending the first half of the series on comedy before turning into a thriller for the second half, and how the finale revisits the events of the first episode, making for a "rock-solid climax". Rebecca Silverman of Anime News Network, reviewing the first half of the series, described it as an interesting concept with nice visual flair when needed, and that the 12th episode was a great hook for the rest of the series. She found the second half of the show to be a step up compared to the first half; she also enjoyed the added urgency, character development, and how the viewer was given insight into their motivations from the first half of the series. Aiden Foote of THEM Anime Reviews gave the series a 5 out of 5 stars, stating: "The build up of characterisation is effective, the show is very entertaining and the complexity is handled with insight and maturity".

Eisenbeis noted the rules for how time travel worked as well-defined, which he said was among the hardest things to do when writing time travel fiction. Pierce Drew of The Fandom Post enjoyed the story and characters. Patrick of Cedar Mill & Bethany Community Libraries called it a "brilliant mash-up of hard science fiction, comedy, romance and drama". Santos praised the character designs as memorable and found it refreshing that the anime featured an overweight person as one of its main characters. He noted that the backgrounds, while making use of muted and grayish tones, still had enough color to be visually appealing.

Silverman found that the series' visuals were uneven for the first half, having some "nice visual flair" at some points, such as a black-and-white scene in episode 11, and some fan-service shots that she found ill-fitting. For the second half, she found the visuals and audio design to have improved, with a focus on visual themes such as clasped hands, and the use of highly detailed and more realistic art during stressful moments in the story. Foote enjoyed the visual presentation of Akihabara, which he described as "lifeless but ever moving, like sand in the desert wind"; he called it evocative of morning street scenes in the 1998 anime series Serial Experiments Lain, and proof that they had not lost their touch since then. Drew thought the visuals were of high quality throughout the series, and that they were a good, albeit less detailed, representation of the art style used in the Steins;Gate game.

=== Sales ===
The first Japanese Blu-ray volume of the series debuted as the week's fourth best-selling animation Blu-ray and the seventh best-selling Blu-ray overall, with 11,802 copies sold according to Oricon; it remained on the sales charts for an additional three weeks, selling 14,921 copies in total. At the end of 2012, volumes 9, 8, and 7 were the 44th, 46th, and 49th best-selling animation Blu-rays of the year in Japan, respectively. The full-series Japanese DVD and Blu-ray boxes also charted: the DVD box, which was released in March 2013, was the 26th best-selling animation DVD of the week, and the Blu-ray box, which was released in February 2016, debuted in fourth place and charted for two weeks.

=== Accolades ===
Protagonist Rintaro Okabe was awarded "Man of the Decade" at the Anime Trending Awards in 2011. In 2011, Steins;Gate was part of the Jury Selections at the 15th Japan Media Arts Festival in the Animation category. It won a Newtype Anime Award for the Best Male anime character of the year, for Okabe. Steins;Gate was nominated for the 43rd Seiun Award in the Best Media category in 2012, but lost to Puella Magi Madoka Magica.

Steins;Gate is widely considered to be one of the best anime series of the 2010s and of all time. IGN listed the series among the best anime series of the 2010s. Crunchyroll also listed it in their list of the "Top 100 Anime of the 2010s".
