= Asami Imai =

Japanese voice actress and singer (born 1977)

- 今井 麻美
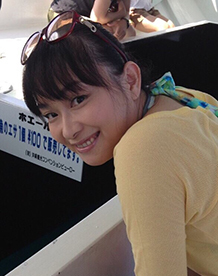
- Imai in 2016
- Born: May 16, 1977 (age 49); Tokyo, Japan
- Education: Meiji University
- Occupations: Voice actress; singer
- Years active: 1997–present
- Agent: Early Wing
- Musical career
- Genre: J-Pop
- Instrument: Vocals
- Years active: 2009–present
- Label: 5pb.

Asami Imai (今井 麻美, Imai Asami; born May 16, 1977) is a Japanese voice actress and singer affiliated with Early Wing. She debuted as a voice actress in 1997 and as singer in 2009 by releasing her first single "Day by Day / Shining Blue Rain" under the 5pb. Records label. She is also well known for giving voices to Chihaya Kisaragi in The Idolmaster (all related productions, except for Idolmaster: Xenoglossia), Kurisu Makise in Steins;Gate, Tsubaki Yayoi in BlazBlue, and Ayumi Shinozaki in Corpse Party. She along with Eri Kitamura formed the music unit Artery Vein which is also under the 5pb. label.

== Biography ==
=== Early life ===
Born in Tokyo in 1977, Imai moved from Shibuya to Tokuyama City (currently Shūnan City) in Yamaguchi Prefecture, when she was eight years old. However, it is stated in her official profile that she was born in Yamaguchi Prefecture. She has stated that she graduated from Tokuyama High School, was vagabond for around a year, before entering Meiji University's School of Arts and Letters, majoring in Drama and Theatre Arts. In late April 2020, she uploaded her Youtube channel.

=== Career ===
In 1998, Imai won the Grand Prize for the Voice Actress category at the ENIX Anime Awards (エニックスアニメ大賞) while she was still studying. Subsequently, she debuted in the following year in the drama CD Toki no Daichi〜Hana no Ōkoku no Majo〜. In 2001, she was chosen as an assistant of the radio show, Tomokazu・Miki's Radio Big Bang. At one point of time in 2006, Imai once thought of giving up her job as a voice actress, but could not bear to leave the voice acting of her role as Chihaya Kisaragi in The Idolmaster to others.

Imai left her agency ArtsVision on April 5, 2007. She then free-lanced under the agency Kaleidoscope for 7 months. On April 22, 2009, Imai released her first major debut single, "Day by Day / Shining Blue Rain" under the 5pb. Records label. In the same year, she transferred to her current agency, Early Wing on December 1. She landed her first lead role as Kiiko Kawakami in the OVA Kuttsukiboshi in 2010. As she began expanding her singing career, she held her first solo live concert on December 25, 2010, and has since held concerts around the period of her birthday in May, as well as December.

On April 18, 2012, Imai was awarded the Best Female Character Voice award at the Famitsu Awards in 2011.

Imai is one of two members of the musical duo Artery Vein, along with Eri Kitamura. The unit mainly performs theme songs for the Corpse Party series. Imai's song "World-Line" is used as the second ending theme to the 2018 anime series Steins;Gate 0. Her song "Believe in Sky" was used as the opening theme to the 2019 anime series Pastel Memories.

== Filmography ==
=== Animation ===
List of voice performances in animation
Year	Title	Role	Notes	Source
2000	Platinumhugen Ordian	Nao Kozuki		
2001	Touch: Cross Road	Girl C		
2001	Prétear	Eiko		
2001	Galaxy Angel	Boy B		
2001	Steel Angel Kurumi 2: Expression	Junior, Student, Clerk		
2001	Figure 17	Nanami Nakajima		
2001	Mahoromatic	Ando-san		
2002	Pita-Ten	Ken		
2002	Shrine of the Morning Mist	Kukiko Sonoda		
2002	Ground Defense Force! Mao-chan	Student, Reporter		
2002	Petite Princess Yucie	Student		
2002	GetBackers	Nurse		
2003	Da Capo	Students, Children		
2003	Kaleido Star: New Wings	Woman		
2003	Bottle Fairy	Fossil Director		
2004	This Ugly Yet Beautiful World	Woman		
2004	Hanaukyo Maid Team La Verite	Comiket customer		
2004	Doki Doki School Hours	Schoolgirl		
2004	Midori Days	Lovers		
2004	Burst Angel	Schoolgirl		
2004	Desert Punk	Daughter		
2005	Lime-iro Ryūkitan X	Shuro Naoe		
2008	Hell Girl: Three Vessels	Momota Masako		
2008–10	Kiss x Sis series	Yūzuki Kiryū	OVA and TV	
2009	Fight Ippatsu! Jūden-chan!!	Bloody Selica		
2009	Needless	Solva		
2009–10	Koihime Musō series	Kakuka		
2010	Shukufuku no Campanella	Chelsea Arcot		
2010	Yumeiro Patissiere SP Professional	Gabriel		
2010	Princess Jellyfish	Classmate		
2011	Megane na Kanojo	Aya Ichinohe		
2011	Steins;Gate	Kurisu Makise		
2011	Sekai-ichi Hatsukoi	Orders manager		
2011	The Idolmaster	Chihaya Kisaragi, Yuu Kisaragi		
2011	Sengoku Paradise Kiwami	Hideaki Kobayakawa		
2012	Place to Place	Schoolgirl		
2012	Sengoku Collection	The Splendor Katakura Kojūrō		
2012	Love, Election and Chocolate	Michiru Morishita		
2013	Senran Kagura: Ninja Flash!	Ikaruga	Also Estival Versus OVA in 2015	
2013	Sunday Without God	Tanya Swedgewood		
2013	Hyperdimension Neptunia: The Animation	Noire / Black Heart		
2013	Walkure Romanze	Rena F. Avery		
2013	BlazBlue Alter Memory	Tsubaki Yayoi		
2014–15	Noragami series	Mayu	Also Aragoto in 2015	
2014	Wooser's Hand-to-Mouth Life	Chihaya Kisaragi	Guest appearance	
2014	Puchimas! Petit Idolmaster	Chihaya Kisaragi, Chihya		
2014	Locodol	Aoi Anan		
2014	Momo Kyun Sword	Kijigami		
2014	Girl Friend Beta	Yukie Yatsuka		
2017	Granblue Fantasy The Animation	Vira		
2018	Steins;Gate 0	Kurisu Makise		
2019	Afterlost	Tsuki		

=== Film ===
List of voice performances in film
Year	Title	Role	Notes	Source
2008	Strait Jacket	Rachel Hammond		
2011	Hotarubi no Mori e	Masked child (younger brother)		
2013	Steins;Gate: Fuka Ryōiki no Déjà vu	Kurisu Makise		
2014	The Idolmaster Movie: Beyond the Brilliant Future!	Chihaya Kisaragi		

=== Live action ===
- Ultraseven X (2007): Soul of Light (ep 6.)

=== Video games ===
List of voice performances in video games
Year	Title	Role	Notes	Source
2002	The Legend of Zelda: The Wind Waker			
2003	Muv-Luv	Archery junior 1	PC adult game As Keiko Horikoshi	
2004	Flame of Recca: Final Burning	Kirito	PS1/PS2	
2005–present	The Idolmaster (series)	Chihaya Kisaragi, Yuu Kisaragi	All except Xenoglossia	
2007	Princess Maker 5	Hiroko Sakakibara	PC	
2007	Akaneiro ni Somaru Saka	Minato Nagase	PC adult game	
2008	Lux-Pain	Lil	DS	
2008	Luminous Arc 2	Fatima	DS	
2008–10	Twinkle Crusaders	Amyrina, Chelsea Akotto (Starlit Brave)	PC adult game As Hikōkai	
2008	To Love-Ru: Exciting Beach School Version	Mei	PSP	
2008–10	Koihime Muso	Kakuka	PC adult game As Namiko Yamazaki	
2009–10	Shukufuku no Campanella	Chelsea Arcot	PC adult game Also as Natsuki Miyagawa	
2009-present	Puyo Puyo (series)	Ringo Andou	DS, PSP, Wii, 3DS, PS3 (since Puyo 7)	
2009–present	Steins;Gate (series)	Kurisu Makise	Including other games in the SciAdv series, including Anonymous;Code	
2009	BlazBlue: Continuum Shift	Tsubaki Yayoi	Arcade	
2010	No Fate! Only the Power of Will	Mutsuki 睦月	PSP	
2010	Prism Rhythm	Caroline Marigold	PC adult game As Mikage Haida	
2010	Atelier Totori: The Adventurer of Arland	Cecilia Helmold	PS3	
2010–present	Corpse Party (series)	Ayumi Shinozaki	5pb. publisher	
2010–present	Hyperdimension Neptunia (series)	Noire / Black Heart		
2010	Kurohyō: Ryū ga Gotoku Shinshō	Chiaki	PSP	
2010–12	Hoshizora e Kakaru Hashi	Minato Nagase (from Akaneiro)	PC adult game As Hikaru Mizusawa	
2010	Love, Election and Chocolate	Michiru Morishita	PC adult game as Riko Inohara; Also Portable in 2012	
2011	Disgaea 4	Emizel	PS3; Also Return in 2014	
2011–present	Senran Kagura (series)	Ikaruga		
2011–12	Hakuisei Renai Shoukougun	Sayuri Sakai	PSP; Also Re:Therapy	
2011	Ragnarok Tactics	Cynthia	PSP	
2011	Walkure Romanze: Shōjo Kishi Monogatari	Rena F. Avery	PC adult game As Natsuki Hasegawa	
2012	Maji de Watashi ni Koishinasai!! S	Jinchu Lee	PC adult game As Maki Nishioka	
2012	Nendoroid Generation	Kurisu Makise	PSP from Steins;Gate	
2012–13	Root Double: Before Crime * After Days	Mashiro Toba	Also Xtend edition in 2013	
2012	Borderlands 2	Lilith		
2012	Girl Friend Beta	Yukie Yatsuka		
2013	JoJo's Bizarre Adventure: All Star Battle	Sex Pistols	PS3; succeeded by Kohsuke Toriumi in *R* remaster on PS4, PS5, Xbox One, Xbox Series X, Nintendo Switch, and PC	
2013	Phantom Breaker: Extra	Kurisu Makise	from Steins;Gate	
2013–15	BlazBlue: Chrono Phantasma	Tsubaki Yayoi / Izayoi	Also Extend and 2.0	
2014	The Awakened Fate Ultimatum	Jupiel Soraumi	PS3	
2014	Granblue Fantasy	Vira, Friday	Mobile / Browser / PC	
2015	Toukiden: Kiwami	Mio		
2015	White Coat Love Addiction	Kaede Ohara 大原かえで		
2015	Trillion: God of Destruction	Levia		
2016	Hero Must Die	Angel Yulia	PS Vita version	
2016	Skullgirls 2nd Encore	Valentine		
2016	MegaTagmension Blanc + Neptune VS Zombies	Noire/Black Heart		
2016	Mary Skelter: Nightmares	Cinderella		
2016	Girls' Frontline	PSG-1, Welrod MkII		
2018	BlazBlue Cross Tag Battle	Izayoi		
2018–present	Azur Lane	Noire / Black Heart, HMS Drake	iOS, Android	
2019	Arknights	Lappland	iOS, Android	
2021	Blue Archive	Sumire	iOS, Android	
2022	Artery Gear	Margot, Alma	iOS, Android	
2026	Girls' Frontline 2: Exilium	Welrod	iOS, Android, PC	

=== Drama CD ===
List of voice performances in drama CD
Title	Role	Notes	Source
Aki Sora	Sora		
Fullmetal Alchemist	Elisa エリサ	CD audio	
Kiss x Sis series	Yūzuki Kiryū		
Metal Slader Glory	Kisaragi Yayoi 如月やよい	CD audio	
Witch of the Kingdom of the time of the earth flower 刻の大地 花の王国の魔女	Nanami Nakajima 中島七海	CD audio Debut work	
Scrapped Princess	Merchant 町人	CD audio	

=== Dubbing ===
==== Live-action ====
- Borderlands (Lilith (Cate Blanchett))

==== Animation ====
- The Summit of the Gods (Ryoko Kishi)

== Discography ==
=== Asami Imai ===
==== Solo Singles ====
- "Day by Day /Shining Blue Rain", released April 22, 2009
- "Strawberry 〜Amaku Setsunai Namida〜", released October 21, 2009
- "Horizon", released April 21, 2010
- "Shangri-La", released July 22, 2010
- "Frame Goshi no Koi", released February 23, 2011
- "Enrai", released May 25, 2011
- "Hana no Saku Basho", released August 3, 2011
- "Hasta La Vista", released April 25, 2012
- "Limited Love", released July 25, 2012
- "Dear Darling", released March 27, 2013
- "Hoshikuzu no Ring", released June 26, 2013
- "Shikkoku no Sustain", released March 26, 2014
- "Tsuioku no Itoguruma", released July 30, 2014
- "Venus no Harmonia", released August 27, 2014
- "Asayake no Starmine", released June 3, 2015
- "BABYLON 〜 before the daybreak", released July 22, 2015
- "Sabaku no Ame", released July 27, 2016
- "Reunion -Once Again-", released October 26, 2016
- "World-Line", released August 29, 2018
- "Niji", released September 9, 2018 (Fan-club single)
- "Believe in Sky", releases January 30, 2019
- "Kimi no Koe no Kazu dake ~Can be strong~", released August 26, 2020 (Fan-club single)

==== Mini-Albums ====
- "Flow of Time", released November 27, 2019

==== Solo albums ====
- "COLOR SANCTUARY", released November 23, 2010
- "Aroma of happiness", released November 30, 2011
- "Precious Sounds", released November 28, 2012
- "Kono Kumo no Hate", released November 27, 2013
- "little legacy", released November 26, 2014
- "Words of GRACE", released February 24, 2016
- "rinascita", released May 16, 2017
- "Gene of the earth", released November 25, 2020
- "Balancing Journey", released December 22, 2021

=== Artery Vein ===
==== Singles ====
- "Confutatis no Inori", released August 25, 2010
- "Last Judgement", released April 20, 2011
- "Pandora no Yoru", released August 24, 2011
- "Kagerou", released August 8, 2012

==== Albums ====
- Artery Vein, released March 7, 2012
