= Steins;Gate 0 (TV series) =

Japanese anime television series

- Key visual, featuring (left to right) Kagari, Yuki, Suzuha, Maho, Kurisu, Rintaro, Mayuri, Daru, Faris, Luka, and Moeka

シュタインズ・ゲート ゼロ (Shutainzu Gēto Zero)
- Genre: Science fiction; Thriller
- Anime television series
- Directed by: Kenichi Kawamura
- Produced by: Makoto Chiba; Takayuki Matsunaga; Kozue Kaneniwa; Satoru Shimosato; Mitsuhiro Ogata; Seon-yi Kim; Shūichi Suzuki
- Written by: Jukki Hanada; Supervised by: (Note: Scenario supervision (シナリオ監修)); Naotaka Hayashi; Tatsuya Matsubara; Ryou Yasumoto; Takuya Nishimura
- Music by: Takeshi Abo; Nobuaki Nobusawa; Moe Hyūga
- Studio: White Fox
- Licensed by: Crunchyroll (Note: In North America through Crunchyroll, LLC (formerly known as Funimation)); AUS: Madman Entertainment; UK: Manga Entertainment
- Original network: Tokyo MX, TVA, KBS, SUN, TVQ, AT-X, BS11, GYT
- English network: SEA: Aniplus Asia
- Original run: April 12, 2018 – September 27, 2018
- Episodes: 23 + OVA

Steins;Gate 0 (Japanese: シュタインズ・ゲート ゼロ, Hepburn: Shutainzu Gēto Zero) is a Japanese anime television series produced by White Fox, based on 5pb.'s 2015 visual novel Steins;Gate 0. It serves as a sequel to Steins;Gate and the 2011 anime adaptation. The series is the final iteration of the Steins;Gate 0 story, which explains certain events in the ending of Steins;Gate. Airing from April to September 2018, it is set in an alternative future where the university student Rintaro Okabe, traumatized after his experiences with time travel, meets the neuroscientists Maho Hiyajo and Alexis Leskinen and becomes a tester for their artificial intelligence system Amadeus.

The series was directed by Kenichi Kawamura, and written by Jukki Hanada, who also wrote the original Steins;Gate anime; the voice cast from previous Steins;Gate anime and games also reprised their roles.

== Plot ==
The series is a final iteration of Rintaro Okabe's experiences in the beta world line after the iterations depicted in the Steins;Gate 0 visual novel. It takes place in an alternative world line from the original Steins;Gate where Rintaro Okabe fails to save Kurisu Makise and doesn't receive any guidance from his future self nor encouragement from Mayuri Shiina. After failing to save Kurisu Makise in order to prevent a future war over time machines, Rintaro Okabe, traumatized over his experiences of meddling with the past with his Reading Steiner ability, accepts his life in the beta world line where Kurisu stays dead. After several months have passed, Rintaro meets Maho Hiyajo and Alexis Leskinen, two of Kurisu's former colleagues who have been working on Amadeus, an artificial intelligence system using Kurisu's memories from before her death. Rintaro accepts a request to help out with Amadeus' development by becoming a tester, conversing with the Amadeus Kurisu through his phone.

== Cast ==
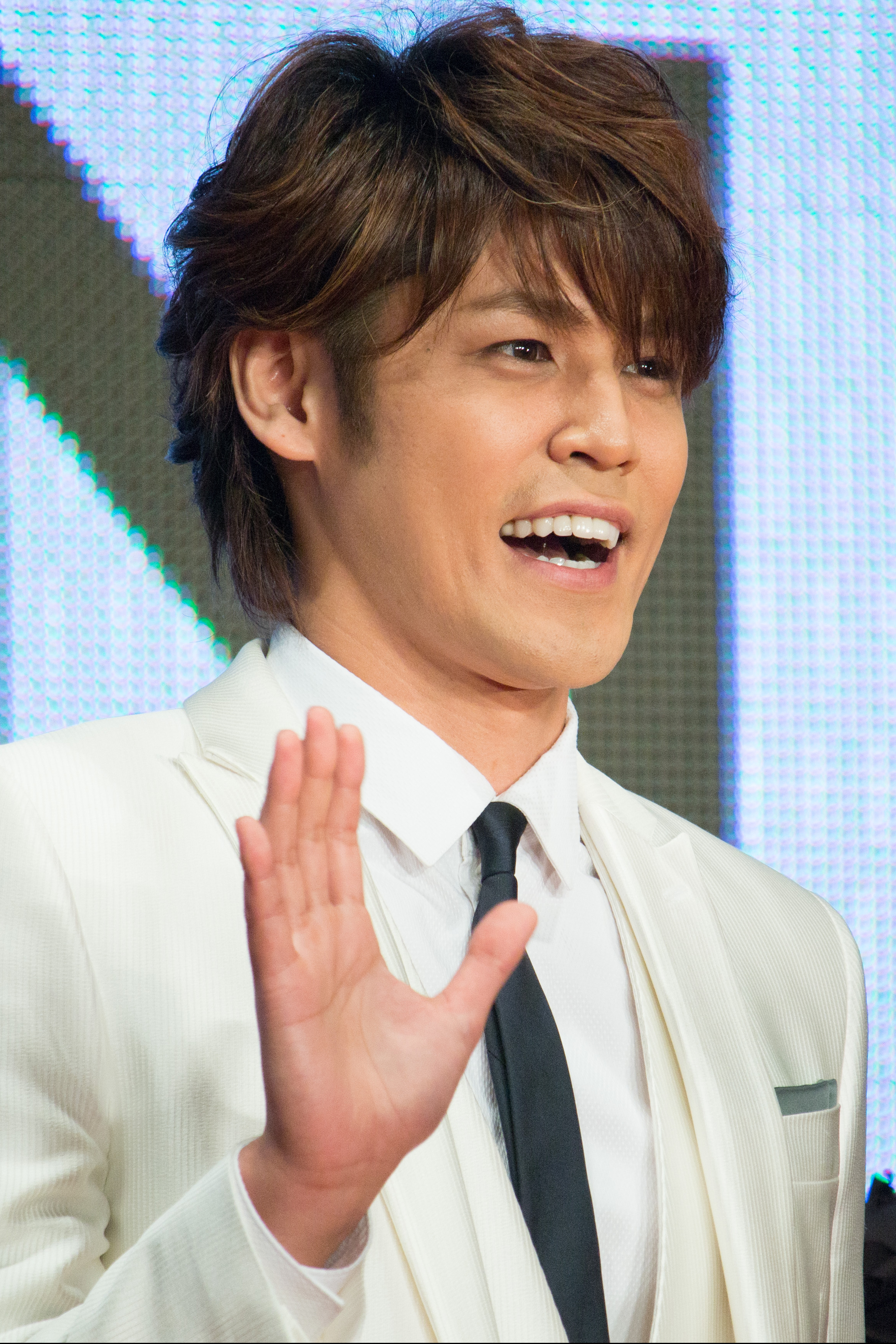
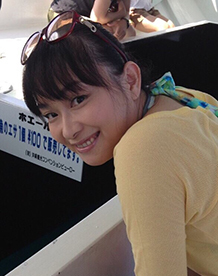
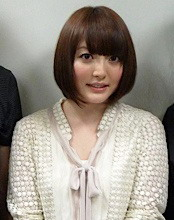
The Japanese voice cast from other Steins;Gate media reprise their roles, including Mamoru Miyano (Rintaro Okabe), Asami Imai (Kurisu Makise), and Kana Hanazawa (Mayuri Shiina).

Character
Character	Japanese	English
Rintaro Okabe	Mamoru Miyano	J. Michael Tatum
Kurisu Makise / Amadeus	Asami Imai	Trina Nishimura
Mayuri Shiina	Kana Hanazawa	Ashly Burch (ep. 1-13); Megan Shipman (ep. 14-23)
Maho Hiyajo	Sayuri Yahagi	Monica Rial
Itaru "Daru" Hashida	Tomokazu Seki	Tyson Rinehart
Suzuha Amane	Yukari Tamura	Cherami Leigh
Luka Urushibara (Note: "Ruka" in Funimation's English dub)	Yū Kobayashi	Lindsay Seidel
Moeka Kiryu	Saori Gotō	Jessica Cavanagh
Faris NyanNyan	Haruko Momoi	Jad Saxton
Kagari Shiina	Megumi Han	Alexis Tipton
Yugo "Mr. Braun" Tennouji	Masaki Terasoma	Christopher Sabat
Yuki Amane	Yukari Tamura	Cherami Leigh
Alexis Leskinen	Yōji Ueda	Chris Wehkamp
Judy Reyes	Maya Nishimura	Emily Neves
Nae Tennouji	Ayano Yamamoto	Brina Palencia
Katsumi "Fubuki" Nakase	Mariko Honda	Mikaela Krantz
Kaede Kurushima	Hina Kino	Bryn Apprill

== Production and release ==
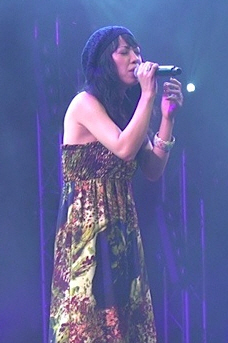
Kanako Itō created the opening theme, "Fátima", as a continuation of the first Steins;Gate anime's opening.

Steins;Gate 0 was produced by White Fox, and partially adapts the 2015 video game of the same name. The game is a sequel to Steins;Gate, which was also adapted into an anime by White Fox in 2011. While the game's story is composed of multiple routes, the anime reconstructs the story into one single route. The series was directed by Kenichi Kawamura and written by Jukki Hanada, the writer for the Steins;Gate anime, while Tomoshige Inayoshi, an episode animation director for the Steins;Gate anime, adapted Huke's character designs from the game for animation, and Takeshi Kodaka served as art director. The music was composed by Takeshi Abo, Nobuaki Nobusawa, and Moe Hyūga. The voice cast reprised their roles from previous Steins;Gate media. The opening theme is "Fátima" (ファティマ) by Kanako Itō, and the ending themes are "Last Game" by Zwei for the first half of the series and "World-Line" by Imai for the second half; the first episode used Itō's song "Amadeus" from the Steins;Gate 0 game as the ending theme, however. Itō created "Fátima" as a lyrical continuation of "Hacking to the Gate", the opening theme to the first Steins;Gate anime, and said that the fast pace was an important aspect as she wanted the theme to be exhilarating.

The anime was originally announced in March 2015, together with the Steins;Gate 0 game. It was re-revealed with a trailer and key art in July 2017 as part of the "Steins;Gate World Line 2017–2018 Project", which also includes other media based on the Steins;Gate 0 game; at this point, the series had gone into production. The 23-episode series aired in Japan between April 12 and September 27, 2018. (Note: Tokyo MX listed the series premiere on April 11, 2018 at 25:35, which is effectively April 12 at 1:35 a.m.) It was broadcast on Tokyo MX, TVA, KBS, SUN, TVQ, AT-X, BS11, and GYT, and is streamed through Abema TV in Japan. The series was simulcast by Crunchyroll outside of Asia and Australasia, by AnimeLab in Australia and New Zealand, and by Aniplus Asia in Southeast Asia, and an English dub began streaming through Funimation in the United States, Canada, the United Kingdom, and Ireland on April 30, 2018. Following Sony's acquisition of Crunchyroll, the dub was moved to Crunchyroll.

The series was released across six Blu-ray and DVD volumes in Japan from June 27 to December 21, 2018, of which the last one includes an additional, unaired episode. The English dub was directed by Cris George and written by Jeramey Kraatz. When adapting the series, they encountered a problem they had not dealt with before: In the first episode, Leskinen gives a speech in English, which Maho live interprets in Japanese, and because all characters in the dub speak English they were initially not sure how to portray the situation. They eventually settled on setting the stage by having Maho's dialogue start in Japanese, before switching to English. Ashly Burch, Mayuri's voice actor in the dub, was unable to play the character for the entirety of the simulcast dub for personal reasons and time constraints; on August 1, 2018, Funimation announced that Megan Shipman would take over the role for the remaining episodes of the simulcast dub, and that they would announce how the role would be handled in the home video release of the series at a later date.
