= White Fox =

Japanese animation studio

White Fox Co., Ltd.

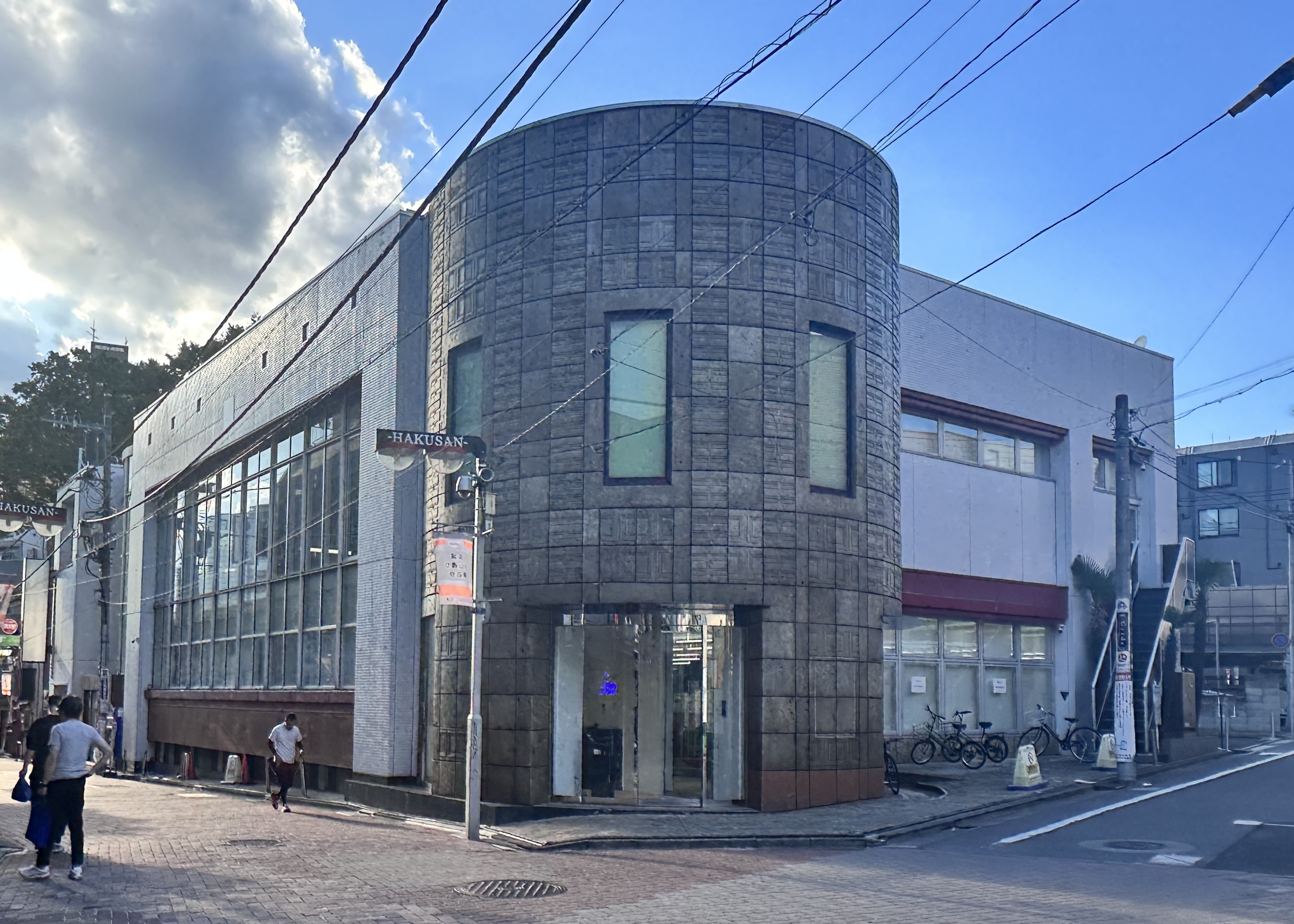
- Headquarters in Suginami, Tokyo
- Native name: 株式会社WHITE FOX
- Romanized name: Kabushiki-gaisha Howaito Fokkusu
- Type: Kabushiki gaisha
- Industry: Japanese animation
- Founded: April 2007; 19 years ago
- Founder: Gaku Iwasa
- Headquarters: Igusa, Suginami, Tokyo, Japan
- Key people: Gaku Iwasa (present and CEO)
- Total equity: ¥ 4 ,000,000
- Owner: AlphaPolis (2025—present)
- Number of employees: 46 (White Fox); 23 (Izukōgen)
- Divisions: White Fox Tokyo Studio; White Fox Izukōgen Studio
- Subsidiaries: Studio Bind (joint venture with Egg Firm)
- Website: https://w-fox.co.jp/; (Official): https://izu-fox.com/; (Izukōgen)

White Fox Co., Ltd. (Japanese: 株式会社WHITE FOX, Hepburn: Kabushiki-gaisha Howaito Fokkusu), is a Japanese animation studio founded in April 2007 by Gaku Iwasa. The studio's most successful productions include adaptations of Steins;Gate, Re:Zero − Starting Life in Another World, and Akame ga Kill!.

== History ==
The studio was founded in April 2007 by Gaku Iwasa and other former staff members of OLM's Team Iwasa, which Iwasa lead. Their first production was the anime series Tears to Tiara. Since then, White Fox has animated shows such as Steins;Gate and Re:Zero and Akame ga Kill!.

On July 31, 2025, it was announced that the studio was acquired by Japanese publishing company AlphaPolis.

== Works ==
=== Television series ===
| Title | Director(s) | First run start date | First run end date | Episodes | Note(s) | Ref(s) |
|---|---|---|---|---|---|---|
| Tears to Tiara | Tomoki Kobayashi | April 6, 2009 | September 28, 2009 | 26 | Based on an adult tactical role-playing game by Leaf. | |
| Katanagatari | Keitaro Motonaga | January 26, 2010 | December 11, 2010 | 12 | Adaptation of a light novel series by Nisio Isin. | |
| Steins;Gate | Hiroshi Hamasaki; Takuya Satō | April 6, 2011 | September 14, 2011 | 24 | Based on a visual novel by 5pb. and Nitroplus. | |
| Jormungand | Keitaro Motonaga | April 10, 2012 | June 26, 2012 | 12 | Adaptation of a manga series by Keitaro Takahashi. | |
| Jormungand: Perfect Order | Keitaro Motonaga | October 10, 2012 | December 26, 2012 | 12 | Sequel to Jormungand. | |
| The Devil Is a Part-Timer! | Naoto Hosoda | April 4, 2013 | June 27, 2013 | 13 | Adaptation of a light novel series by Satoshi Wagahara. | |
| SoniAni: Super Sonico The Animation | Kenichi Kawamura | January 6, 2014 | March 24, 2014 | 12 | Based on a video game character by Nitroplus. | |
| Is the Order a Rabbit? | Hiroyuki Hashimoto | April 10, 2014 | June 26, 2014 | 12 | Adaptation of a manga series by Koi. | |
| Akame ga Kill! | Tomoki Kobayashi | July 7, 2014 | December 15, 2014 | 24 | Adaptation of a manga series by Takahiro and Tetsuya Tashiro. | |
| Utawarerumono: The False Faces | Keitaro Motonaga | October 3, 2015 | March 26, 2016 | 25 | Based on a tactical role-playing game by Leaf. | |
| Is the Order a Rabbit?? | Hiroyuki Hashimoto | October 10, 2015 | December 26, 2015 | 12 | Sequel to Is the Order a Rabbit?. Co-animated with Kinema Citrus. | |
| Re:Zero − Starting Life in Another World | Masaharu Watanabe | April 4, 2016 | September 19, 2016 | 25 | Adaptation of a light novel series by Tappei Nagatsuki. | |
| Matoi the Sacred Slayer | Masayuki Sakoi | October 4, 2016 | December 29, 2016 | 12 | Original work. | |
| Grimoire of Zero | Tetsuo Hirakawa | April 10, 2017 | June 26, 2017 | 12 | Adaptation of a light novel series by Kakeru Kobashiri. | |
| Girls' Last Tour | Takaharu Ozaki | October 6, 2017 | December 22, 2017 | 12 | Adaptation of a manga series by Tsukumizu. | |
| Steins;Gate 0 | Kenichi Kawamura | April 12, 2018 | September 27, 2018 | 23 | Based on a visual novel by 5pb. | |
| Goblin Slayer | Takaharu Ozaki | October 7, 2018 | December 30, 2018 | 12 | Adaptation of a light novel series by Kumo Kagyu. | |
| Arifureta: From Commonplace to World's Strongest | Kinji Yoshimoto | July 8, 2019 | October 7, 2019 | 13 | Adaptation of a light novel series by Ryo Shirakome. Co-animated with Asread. | |
| Cautious Hero: The Hero Is Overpowered but Overly Cautious | Masayuki Sakoi | October 2, 2019 | December 27, 2019 | 12 | Adaptation of a light novel series by Light Tuchihi. | |
| Re:Zero − Starting Life in Another World 2nd Season | Masaharu Watanabe | July 8, 2020 | March 24, 2021 | 25 | Sequel to Re:Zero − Starting Life in Another World. | |
| Utawarerumono: Mask of Truth | Kenichi Kawamura | July 3, 2022 | December 25, 2022 | 28 | Based on a tactical role-playing game by Aquaplus. | |
| Sengoku Youko | Masahiro Aizawa | January 11, 2024 | December 26, 2024 | 35 | Adaptation of a manga series by Satoshi Mizukami. | |
| Re:Zero − Starting Life in Another World 3rd Season | Masahiro Shinohara | October 2, 2024 | March 26, 2025 | 16 | Sequel to Re:Zero − Starting Life in Another World 2nd Season. | |
| Uglymug, Epicfighter | Toshiyuki Sone | July 6, 2025 | September 21, 2025 | 12 | Adaptation of a web novel series by Ryō Hiromatsu. | |
| Re:Zero − Starting Life in Another World 4th Season | Masahiro Shinohara | April 8, 2026 | September 30, 2026 | 19 | Sequel to Re:Zero − Starting Life in Another World 3rd Season. | |
| Magical Explorer | Kazuki Ohashi | October 4, 2026 | TBA | TBA | Adaptation of a light novel series by Iris. | |
| How I Became King by Eating Monsters | TBA | 2027 | TBA | TBA | Adaptation of a light novel series by Daken. | |

=== OVA/ONAs ===
| Title | Director(s) | Release date | Episodes | Note(s) | Ref(s) |
|---|---|---|---|---|---|
| Steins;Gate: Egoistic Poriomania | Hiroshi Hamasaki (Chief); Takuya Satō (Chief); Tomoki Kobayashi | February 22, 2012 | 1 | Unaired episode of Steins;Gate. | |
| DPR: Dual-frequency Precipitation Radar | —N/a | October 17, 2013 | 1 | A short anime made for JAXA and NASA that promotes the GPM/DPR (Global Precipitation Measurement/Dual-frequency Precipitation Radar) space mission. | |
| Steins;Gate: Sōmei Eichi no Cognitive Computing | Kenichirō Murakawa | October 14, 2014 – November 11, 2014 | 4 | Short ONA series based on Steins;Gate. | |
| Steins;Gate: Open the Missing Link | Hiroshi Hamasaki; Takuya Satō | December 2, 2015 | 1 | Alternative episode 23 (episode 23β) of Steins;Gate aired during the rerun after the release of Steins;Gate 0. | |
| Utawarerumono: Tusukuru-kōjo no Karei Naru Hibi | Keitaro Motonaga | April 26, 2018 | 1 | Released with the premium collection PS4/Vita remake of Utawarerumono: Chiriyukumono e no Komoriuta. | |
| Re:Zero − Starting Life in Another World: Memory Snow | Tatsuya Koyanagi (Chief); Masaharu Watanabe | October 6, 2018 | 1 | Takes place between episodes 11 and 12 of the first season, and episodes 6 and 7 of the Director's Cut. | |
| Steins;Gate 0: Valentine's of Crystal Polymorphism -Bittersweet Intermedio- | Kenichi Kawamura | December 21, 2018 | 1 | Unaired episode of Steins;Gate 0. | |
| Re:Zero − Starting Life in Another World: Hyōketsu no Kizuna | Kenichi Kawamura (Chief); Masaharu Watanabe | November 8, 2019 | 1 | Prequel to Re:Zero − Starting Life in Another World. | |
| Arifureta: From Commonplace to World's Strongest | Kinji Yoshimoto | November 25, 2019 – February 26, 2020 | 2 | Unaired episodes of Arifureta: From Commonplace to World's Strongest. Co-animated with Asread. | |

=== Films ===
| Title | Director | Release Date | Note(s) | Ref(s) |
|---|---|---|---|---|
| Steins;Gate: The Movie − Load Region of Déjà Vu | Hiroshi Hamasaki (Chief); Takuya Satō (Chief); Kanji Wakabayashi | April 20, 2013 | Sequel to Steins;Gate. | |
| Peacemaker Kurogane: Belief | Shigeru Kimiya | June 2, 2018 | Sequel to Peacemaker Kurogane. | |
| Peacemaker Kurogane: Friend | Shigeru Kimiya | November 17, 2018 | Sequel to Peacemaker Kurogane: Belief. | |
| Goblin Slayer: Goblin's Crown | Takaharu Ozaki | February 1, 2020 | Sequel to Goblin Slayer. | |

=== Video games ===
| Title | Platforms | Release Date | Note(s) | Ref(s) |
|---|---|---|---|---|
| Steins;Gate Elite | PlayStation 4, PlayStation Vita, Nintendo Switch, Microsoft Windows | PS4, NS: JP: September 20, 2018; WW: February 19, 2019; PlayStation Vita: JP: September 20, 2018; Microsoft Windows: WW: February 19, 2019 | Using footage from Steins;Gate. | |
