= Steins;Gate: The Movie − Load Region of Déjà Vu =

2013 Japanese animated film

- Theatrical release poster, featuring Kurisu Makise and Rintaro Okabe

劇場版 シュタインズ・ゲート 負荷領域のデジャヴ (Gekijōban Shutainzu Gēto: Fuka Ryōiki no Dejavu)
- Genre: Psychological thriller; Science fiction
- Anime film
- Directed by: Hiroshi Hamasaki; Takuya Satō; Kanji Wakabayashi
- Produced by: Kenjirō Gomi
- Written by: Jukki Hanada
- Music by: Jun Murakami; Takeshi Abo
- Studio: White Fox
- Licensed by: AUS: Madman Entertainment; NA: Funimation; UK: Manga Entertainment
- Released: April 20, 2013
- Runtime: 90 minutes
- Manga
- Written by: Reki Kugayama
- Published by: Kadokawa Shoten
- Magazine: Shōnen Ace
- Original run: March 26, 2013 – November 26, 2013
- Volumes: 2
- Novel series
- Written by: Tatsuya Hamazaki
- Illustrated by: Huke; Kyūta Sakai; Bun150
- Published by: Kadokawa Shoten
- Imprint: Kadokawa Sneaker Bunko
- Original run: May 1, 2013 – June 1, 2013
- Volumes: 2

Steins;Gate: The Movie − Load Region of Déjà Vu (Japanese: 劇場版 シュタインズ・ゲート 負荷領域のデジャヴ, Hepburn: Gekijōban Shutainzu Gēto: Fuka Ryōiki no Dejavu) is a 2013 Japanese animated science fiction film produced by White Fox. It is a follow-up to the 2011 anime television series Steins;Gate, which was based on the visual novel game of the same name, and is part of the Science Adventure franchise. The film premiered in Japanese theaters on April 20, 2013.

== Plot ==
The film takes place in August 2011, one year after the events of the anime series. After going through a painstaking journey across multiple "world lines" due to the invention of 'D-Mail', text messages that can be sent to the past, Rintaro Okabe has assumedly landed in the "Steins Gate" world line, in which he was able to prevent the deaths of both Mayuri Shiina and Kurisu Makise, as well as prevent a future ruled by the malignant organization SERN due to the invention of a time machine that no longer exists. On August 3, Kurisu arrives in Japan for a press conference and reunites with all the members of the Future Gadget Laboratory. Meanwhile, Okabe starts experiencing intense side effects from his time travels, seeing visions of alternate world lines. The next day on August 4, a mysterious visitor shows up at Kurisu's hotel, telling her to remember three things: a cell phone, a microwave oven, and SERN. Later that day, as Kurisu is telling Okabe about how her own instances of déjà vu may be similar to his "Reading Steiner" ability to remember things from other world lines, Okabe suddenly disappears before Kurisu's eyes. Furthermore, no one else seems to remember that Okabe ever existed, with Kurisu herself barely retaining a faint memory of him.

A week later on August 11, as Kurisu finds a fork that Okabe left behind and remembers the words the stranger left her, she learns Itaru "Daru" Hashida had for some reason hacked SERN, suddenly giving her the urge to build a Time Leap machine. Using the machine, Kurisu leaps back to the night of August 3, where she observes Okabe disappearing and reappearing from existence, with everyone's memories of him changing accordingly. She is then contacted by the visitor from before, revealed to be Suzuha Amane, who came from the future using a time machine Kurisu built. She explains to both Kurisu and Okabe that all the memories of world lines Okabe had visited is overloading his Reading Steiner, causing him to fluctuate between the current world line and the "R" world line, the only other world line where neither Mayuri nor Kurisu die. Suzuha states the only way to save him from vanishing completely is to use a time machine to travel to the past, but Okabe ostensibly refuses, as he feels neither time machines nor time leap machines should exist and doesn't want Kurisu to go through the same suffering he went through, saying he would rather disappear to allow her and Mayuri to live in peace. He instead urges Kurisu to forget about him, leaving her with a kiss.

After Okabe disappears once again the next day, Kurisu breaks down in tears before grudgingly deciding to accept his wish and try to forget him. Later, on August 13, as the Future Gadget Lab gets word that it might have to close up, Kurisu is once again approached by Suzuha, who tells her that she is not being honest with her own feelings, eventually convincing Kurisu to go with her in her time machine. In order to keep Okabe in the Steins Gate world line, he must be implanted with a powerful memory that helps distinguish it from other world lines. The two travel back to June 30, 2005, where Kurisu attempts to talk with the young Okabe, only to result in him being killed in a car accident instead, leaving her too afraid to attempt another trip to the past. Back in the present, Kurisu discovers Mayuri and the others also possess faint memories of Okabe, which are soon awakened when she does an imitation of his persona, Kyouma Hououin. Encouraged by everyone's feelings, Kurisu returns to the past, this time succeeding in her mission by implanting the concept of Kyouma Hououin into Okabe's mind and giving him his first kiss, which led him to take on his "mad scientist" persona to protect Mayuri. With this, Kurisu manages to bring Okabe back to the Steins Gate world line and the movie ends with Okabe asking Kurisu if she will return his first kiss to him. Smiling, Kurisu says "Never".

== Production ==
Steins;Gate: Fuka Ryōiki no Déjà vu was first announced at the end of the anime television series on September 13, 2011. The opening theme is "Anata no Eranda Kono Toki o" (あなたの選んだこの時を, The Moment You Made Your Decision) by Kanako Itō while the ending theme is "Itsumo Kono Basho de" (いつもこの場所で, Always in this Place) by Ayane.

The film was released in both DVD and Blu-ray Disc home video versions in Japan on December 13, 2013. Several versions were released; a standard DVD edition, a standard Blu-ray Disc edition, a five-disc combo pack containing several radio dramas, and a six-disc combo pack containing the radio dramas in addition to the film's soundtrack. Additional items were shipped depending on the retailer. The Japanese release also includes English subtitles. Funimation released the film on Blu-ray Disc/DVD in North America on March 28, 2017.

== Release ==
The film premiered in Japanese theaters on April 20, 2013, and was released on BD/DVD on December 13, 2013. The film has been licensed in North America by Funimation, and it was released in English in March 2017.

== Reception ==
The film debuted as the number 7 movie of the weekend; making 86,822,800 yen (US$874,130) across 18 theaters in Japan. It later went on to make 319,125,723 yen (US$3,142,750) at the box office, but dropped to the number 12 spot by its third weekend. Chiyomaru Shikura later reported via his Twitter page that the movie had grossed over 500 million yen (US$5,000,000). He additionally revealed that he had accepted only a single yen as a royalty fee from the film. During their coverage of the upcoming Blu-ray and DVD release, Famitsu reported that the film had grossed over 550 million yen (US$5,600,000).

Richard Eisenbeis and Toshi Nakamura of Kotaku stated, "This movie really lives or dies on how well you connect to Kurisu and Okabe— and given the amazing performances of their voice actors, I can't imagine not being able to," and proceeded to call it, "An excellent epilogue to the Steins;Gate story."

== Other media ==
A manga adaptation by Reki Kugayama was serialized in Kadokawa Shoten's Shōnen Ace magazine between the May and December 2013 issues, released on March 26 and October 26, 2013, respectively. The series was collected in two volumes, released on April 24 and December 26, 2013. A two-volume novel series, written by Tatsuya Hamazaki and illustrated by Huke, Kyūta Sakai, and Bun150, was published by Kadokawa Shoten under their Kadokawa Sneaker Bunko imprint. The two volumes were released on May 1 and June 1, 2013.
