= Rintaro Okabe =

Fictional character from Steins;Gate

- Science Adventure character
- Rintaro Okabe, as he appears in Steins;Gate
- First appearance: Steins;Gate (2009)
- Created by: Tatsuya Matsubara
- Designed by: Huke
- Voiced by: EN: J. Michael Tatum; JA: Mamoru Miyano

In-universe information
- Alias: Hououin Kyouma

Rintaro Okabe (Japanese: 岡部 倫太郎, Hepburn: Okabe Rintarō) is a fictional character and the protagonist of the visual novel game Steins;Gate (2009), developed by 5pb. and Nitroplus and part of the Science Adventure series. Okabe is a self-proclaimed mad scientist who often goes by the pseudonym Kyouma Hououin (Japanese: 鳳凰院 凶真, Hepburn: Hōōin Kyōma). He is also nicknamed and referred to as Okarin by his friends Shiina Mayuri and Itaru "Daru" Hashida.

He is the founder of what he calls the "Future Gadget Laboratory" in Akihabara, where he spends most of his time and has dubbed himself Lab Member No. 001. As he experiments with time travel, he learns that he is the only one who possesses the ability to determine changes between different timelines, which he dubs "Reading Steiner". He is a first-year student at Tokyo Denki University. Okabe is voiced by Mamoru Miyano in Japanese and J. Michael Tatum in English.

Okabe has received a positive critical reception due to his character traits and development, along with his darker characterization in Steins;Gate 0. In 2011, Rintaro Okabe won the 1st Newtype Anime Awards for the Best Male anime character of the year.

== Creation and development ==
Tatsuya Matsubara created Okabe with the idea of how he grows to care for others in the narrative and goes on a journey to save them. He aimed to connect Okabe's traits with the player's feelings not only by gameplay but also by the content of the narrative, most notably in the form the relationship he forms. To express the character's struggles of trying in regards to how Okabe aims to save the world, Matsubara said it was necessary for the team to create a game structure that was a little jarring. He was concerned the players might not be able to clear the game, relying on that collective intelligence. As a result, Matsubara received a report that players were able to clear the game within the first week. At the time, it was expected in Japan to dig a little deeper into the characters after a visual novel game was released in the form of another product. Although Steins;Gate did follow this, it was not his intention to have the players experience the struggle of witnessing the serious Okabe in the main text. If I did, I felt like that would thin out the main text. He aimed to give Okabe an uncommon scenario in sci-fi storytelling, expecting the players to be surprised as well.

Geraint Evans stated that while Okabe is well explored in the anime, the visual novel gave fans the chance to understand the relationship between Mayuri and Okabe much better than in the anime. In one of the spin-off games, a large influence on his scenario was the anime series Code Geass (2006–2007), with the character Lelouch Lamperouge influencing Okabe's "wannabe bad guy" characterization.

In Japanese, Okabe is voiced by Mamoru Miyano. J. Michael Tatum plays the character in English dubs and had to change different parts of Miyano's take when doing commentaries so that Western audiences would understand Okabe's explanations.

== Appearances ==
=== Steins;Gate ===
On July 28, 2010, Rintaro Okabe and his friend Shiina Mayuri head towards the Radio Kaikan building for a conference, where Rintaro finds a girl named Makise Kurisu lying in a pool of blood. As Rintaro sends a text message about the incident to his friend, Hashida "Daru" Itaru, he experiences a strange phenomenon and the people around him disappear, with no one else noticing anything had changed. After later running into Kurisu, who is strangely alive and well, and discovering the message he had sent to Itaru had arrived a week before he sent it, Rintaro soon deduces that the 'Mobile Microwave' he and his friends had been developing is, in fact, a time machine capable of sending text messages to the past. He and his friends soon learn that SERN, an organization that has been researching time travel for some time, has actually succeeded in sending humans into the past although they seem to have all resulted in the test subjects' deaths. Rintaro begins experimenting with "D-Mails" (Dメール, D mēru; short for DeLorean mail), which begin to cause major differences in the timeline. Kurisu also manages to create a device to send a person's memories through the microwave, allowing that person to effectively leap into the past.

=== Steins;Gate 0 ===
The game begins during Steins;Gate's ending, where Suzuha traveled to August 21, 2010, using her time machine to get Okabe to prevent a time-travel arms race leading to World War III; to do this, he needs to stop Kurisu's father, Doctor Nakabachi, from killing Kurisu and bringing her time travel theories to Russia. Suzuha brings Okabe to the moment of the murder, July 28, 2010, but he accidentally kills Kurisu himself due to world-line convergence. Upon returning to the present, Okabe refuses Suzuha's requests to try again, and develops post-traumatic stress disorder. Nearly five months later, Okabe attends Kurisu's coworkers Maho and Leskinen's presentation of their Amadeus system, which uses digitized memories as artificial intelligence avatars; one avatar has been made based on Kurisu. Speaking with them, Okabe becomes a tester for Amadeus, allowing him to communicate with Amadeus Kurisu through his phone. While trying to change Okabe's mind, Suzuha looks for Kagari, who got separated when traveling to 1998. Maho, who has Kurisu's hard drive, wants to access her theories, hoping to be able to save Kurisu; Russia, other countries, and groups including SERN are also after the theories, and the world line shifts as they monitor activities surrounding Kurisu's theories and memories.

=== Steins;Gate: The Movie − Load Region of Déjà Vu ===
After going through a painstaking journey across multiple 'World Lines' due to the invention of 'D-Mail', text messages that can be sent to the past, Rintaro Okabe has assumedly landed in the "Steins Gate" World Line, in which he was able to prevent the deaths of both Shiina Mayuri and Makise Kurisu, as well as prevent a future ruled by SERN due to the invention of a time machine that no longer exists. On August 3, Kurisu arrives in Japan for a press conference and reunites with all the members of the Future Gadget Laboratory. Meanwhile, Rintaro starts having intense side effects from his time travels, seeing visions of alternate Worldlines. The next day on August 4, a mysterious visitor shows up at Kurisu's hotel, telling her to remember three things: a cell phone, a microwave oven, and SERN. Later that day, as Kurisu is talking to Rintaro about how her own instances of déjà vu may be similar to Rintaro's 'Reading Steiner' ability to remember things from other World Lines, Rintaro suddenly disappears before Kurisu's eyes. Furthermore, no one else seems to remember Rintaro ever existed, with Kurisu barely retaining a faint memory of someone.

=== Steins;Gate: My Darling's Embrace ===
Rintaro Okabe's main problem is paying the bills for the laboratory, having to take a part-time job as a waiter. The game has multiple routes, each focusing on Okabe building a romantic relationship with one of the characters from Steins;Gate. The player affects the direction of the plot by picking choices, by answering Okabe's phone, and by clicking on highlighted text within text messages on the phone.

=== Robotics;Notes DaSH ===
According to Itaru, Okabe has gone to America for research after coming up with the "Worldline Theory", most likely with Makise Kurisu and Hiyajo Maho. He reinvented the Divergence Meter to watch the "Steins Gate" worldline, which should display the number 1.048596, but it's glitched, worrying Okabe enough to call Daru, who he mentions that Okabe never goes out of his way to message or calls. He relays a message before calling Daru saying "The Worldline trembles..."

== Reception ==
=== Popularity ===
Rintaro Okabe won the first Newtype Anime Awards for the Best Male anime character of the year in 2011. RiceDigital listed Okabe and Makise as one of the best couples in visual novels history superior to his favorites from Danganronpa based on how carefully is their relationship developed across the narrative of the game.

=== Critical response ===
Critical reception to the character in the visual novel has been positive. Destructoid praised Okabe's character and his relationship with the rest of the cast based on how appealing they were; with Siliconera preferring the one he starts with Kurisu based on the comical interactions. Pete Davison of USGamer acclaimed Okabe as "one of the most fascinating lead characters I've enjoyed the company of in quite some time" based on the handling of his character and the voice provided by Mamoru Miyano. In another review, GamesTm stated that Okabe deconstructs the ideas for a scientist in a positive fashion due to how he avoids stereotypical traits seen in fiction comparing him to "Rick And Morty's titular professor more than any other genre rival". IGN felt the bonds Okabe has with his friends were also appealing when talking about multiple subjects based on different types of ideas to help his dialogue be easier to understand.

Critics also commented on Okabe's darker characterization from Steins;Gate 0. Crunchyroll stated that while his appearance has not changed with the exception of his black coat, Okabe shows signs of suffering post-traumatic stress disorder and depression as a result of Kurisu's death. As a result, the site found Okabe's new personality as unique as Okabe still has not recovered from Kurisu's death and how the plot handles his weakness. Jenni Lada from Siliconera found the depressed Okabe more interesting. She cited how weak Okabe is portrayed in the sequel, finding him as a person in need of therapy but cannot find recovery through it. Destructoid referred to him as the most changed character due to his lack of crazy demeanor and that did not care about the future of his life in a possible World War III. Despite the dark narrative, Carden still found Okabe and Maho had segment that could produce a laughter. Hardcore Gamer found that players might be affected by how Okabe passes his free time interacting with an AI based on Kurisu, something that might instead hurt him rather than recover from his trauma. Rogan said that Okabe's character development since the original game made him a more interesting character, and Fenner thought that Okabe's characterization was the high point of the game, calling his self-hatred and impostor syndrome a believable depiction of high-functioning depression. Both Carden and Rogan enjoyed the use of multiple viewpoints in the story, saying that they give characters more depth and believability, and give the player a greater understanding of them.

In regards to the anime adaptation of the visual novels, DVD Talk enjoyed Okabe's character arc as he becomes a more realistic person across the story. Pierce Drew at The Fandom Post regarded Okabe as having "massive, spotlighting personality" due to his "mad scientist" actions, like delivering laughs in a chaotic manner regardless of voice actor. THEM Anime Reviews described Okabe as "occasionally brilliant" who despite having a crazy personality, he still develops as a character similar. The critic also praised the relationship Okabe has with Kurisu, stating they have "chemistry" while both of them acting as tsundere while also enjoying the way the protagonist also bonds with his childhood friend Mayuri. As the movie focused solely on Okabe and Kurisu, Richard Eisenbeis and Toshi Nakamura of Kotaku stated, "This movie really lives or dies on how well you connect to Kurisu and Okabe— and given the amazing performances of their voice actors, I can't imagine not being able to". Commenting on the anime based on Steins;Gate 0, Anime News Network praised how aware was the series in regards to the depressed Okabe interacted with the AI Amadeus as a fellow character insists the real Kurisu is dead and thus, the more Okabe talks with Amadeus, the more it will hurt him to face the reality without the woman he loved.

=== Analysis ===
South-Eastern Finland University of Applied Sciences said that Okabe is a rare case of a visual novel protagonist; the protagonist actually has their own traits to isolate themselves from the other characters. Okabe Rintaro from Steins;Gate is handled as a chuunibyou-type character, a Japanese term referring to teenagers and young adults who have developed traits from overly dramatic fictional characters for the purpose of standing out and looking unique. According to Macquarie University, the character has a notorious mental problem; Okabe's paranoia produces this reduction of everyday objects to items of dread. For Okabe, the only meaningful content of a broken clock is death. Simple items such as clocks, when framed by paranoia, disclose the world in a certain way. Within the mood of paranoia, certain everyday objects are disclosed in particular ways and are only capable of producing fear. This simple form of paranoia shows a mood in which it is enclosing relationship to its equipment-filled world, first and foremost, which produces unfreedom. In analysing the series, University of North Texas at Dallas noticed the series focuses on the tragedy of 3/11, but some themes remain, particularly constant disaster and the determination to continue regardless of adversity; Okabe Rintaro's quest invokes an example of this as he invents a time machine and seeks to change the events of the past in order to prevent a tragedy. Yet the more he tries to change the past, the more complicated everything becomes often reducing himself to despair in contrast to his friendlier teammates. Similarly, the University of Nebraska–Lincoln said Okabe is able to twist time repeatedly using a machine that can send only text messages back in time. His laboratory members then plan to create a real time machine that could send memories, instead of just text messages, into the past. He is shocked by the death of Mayuri which leads to further exploration of ideas of time travel in regards to whether or not he can save her.
