= 2018 in anime =

Events in 2018 in anime. The final full year of the Heisei era.

== Releases ==
=== Films ===
A list of anime that debuted in theaters between January 1 and December 31, 2018.

Release date	Title	Studio	Director	Running time (minutes)	Notes	Ref
January 6	Love, Chunibyo & Other Delusions! Take on Me	Kyoto Animation	Tatsuya Ishihara	90		
February 9	Macross Delta the Movie: Passionate Walküre	Satelight	Shoji Kawamori	119		
February 10	Code Geass: Lelouch of the Rebellion: Rebellion Path	Sunrise	Goro Taniguchi	132		
February 24	Maquia: When the Promised Flower Blooms	P.A. Works	Mari Okada	115		
March 3	Bungo Stray Dogs: Dead Apple	Bones	Takuya Igarashi	120		
March 3	Doraemon the Movie: Nobita's Treasure Island	Shin-Ei Animation	Kazuaki Imai	108		
April 7	Servamp: Alice in the Garden	Platinum Vision	Hideaki Nakano	58		
April 13	Crayon Shin-chan: Burst Serving! Kung Fu Boys ~Ramen Rebellion~	Shin-Ei Animation	Wataru Takahashi	105		
April 13	Detective Conan: Zero the Enforcer	TMS Entertainment	Yuzuru Tachikawa	110		
April 21	Liz and the Blue Bird	Kyoto Animation	Naoko Yamada	90		
May 5	Digimon Adventure tri. Future	Toei Animation	Keitaro Motonaga	98		
May 18	Godzilla: City on the Edge of Battle	Polygon Pictures	Kobun Shizuno; Hiroyuki Seshita	100		
May 26	Code Geass: Lelouch of the Rebellion: Imperial Path	Sunrise	Goro Taniguchi	120		
June 2	Peacemaker Kurogane Part 1: Belief	White Fox	Shigeru Kimiya			
July 7	K: Seven Stories - R:B Blaze	GoHands	Shingo Suzuki	55		
July 13	Pokémon the Movie: The Power of Us	OLM; Wit Studio	Tetsuo Yajima	105		
July 20	Mirai	Studio Chizu	Mamoru Hosoda	98		
August 3	My Hero Academia: Two Heroes	Bones	Kenji Nagasaki	97		
August 4	Flavors of Youth	CoMix Wave Films; Haoliners Animation League	Li Haoling; Jiaoshou Yi Xiaoxing; Yoshitaka Takeuchi	74		
August 4	K: Seven Stories - Side: Blue	GoHands	Shingo Suzuki	54		
August 17	Penguin Highway	Studio Colorido	Hiroyasu Ishida	119		
August 18	The Seven Deadly Sins the Movie: Prisoners of the Sky	A-1 Pictures	Noriyuki Abe; Yasuto Nishikata	99		
August 22	Movie Shimajiro Mahō no Shima no Daibōken	Benesse Corporation	Hiroshi Kawamata, Hiro Takashima	52		
August 24	Modest Heroes	Studio Ponoc	Hiromasa Yonebayashi; Yoshiyuki Momose; Akihiko Yamashita	44		
August 24	Drive Head: Tomica Hyper Rescue Kidō Kyūkyū Keisatsu	OLM; Xebec	Takao Kato	57		
August 25	Non Non Biyori Vacation	Silver Link	Shinya Kawatsura	71		
September 1	I Want to Eat Your Pancreas	Studio VOLN	Shinichiro Ushijima	108		
September 1	K: Seven Stories - Side: Green	GoHands	Shingo Suzuki	52		
September 29	Natsume's Book of Friends the Movie: Ephemeral Bond	Shuka	Takahiro Omori; Hideaki Itō	104		
October 5	Monster Strike the Movie: Sora no Kanata	Orange	Hiroshi Nishikiori	97		
October 6	Garo: The Fleeting Cherry Blossom	Studio VOLN; Studio M2	Satoshi Nishimura	82		
October 6	K: Seven Stories - Lost Small World	GoHands	Shingo Suzuki	57		
October 19	Magical Girl Lyrical Nanoha Detonation	Seven Arcs Pictures	Takayuki Hamana	111		
November 3	K: Seven Stories - Memory of Red	GoHands	Shingo Suzuki	55		
November 9	Godzilla: The Planet Eater	Polygon Pictures	Kobun Shizuno; Hiroyuki Seshita	91		
November 10	Zoku Owarimonogatari	Shaft	Akiyuki Shinbo	148		
November 17	Peacemaker Kurogane Part 2: Friend	White Fox	Shigeru Kimiya			
November 30	Mobile Suit Gundam Narrative	Sunrise	Toshikazu Yoshizawa	90		
December 1	K: Seven Stories - Nameless Song	GoHands	Shingo Suzuki	58		
December 14	Dragon Ball Super: Broly	Toei Animation	Tatsuya Nagamine	100		

=== Television series ===
A list of anime television series that debuted between January 1 and December 31, 2018.

First run start and end dates	Title	Episodes	Studio	Director	Original title	Ref
January 2 – March 27	A Place Further than the Universe	13	Madhouse	Atsuko Ishizuka	Sora Yori mo Tōi Basho	
January 4 – March 22	Laid-Back Camp	12	C-Station	Yoshiaki Kyogoku	Yurucamp	
January 4 – March 22	Ms. Koizumi Loves Ramen Noodles	12	Studio Gokumi; AXsiZ	Kenji Seto	Ramen Daisuki Koizumi-san	
January 5 – March 23	Junji Ito Collection	12	Studio Deen	Shinobu Tagashira		
January 5 – June 22	Katana Maidens ~ Toji No Miko	24	Studio Gokumi	Kodai Kakimoto		
January 6 – June 23	Record of Grancrest War	24	A-1 Pictures	Mamoru Hatakeyama	Grancrest Senki	
January 6 – March 24	Sanrio Boys	12	Pierrot	Masashi Kudō		
January 6 – March 24	Citrus	12	Passione	Takeo Takahashi		
January 7 – March 25	Slow Start	12	CloverWorks	Hiroyuki Hashimoto		
January 7 – March 25	Pop Team Epic	12	Kamikaze Douga	Jun Aoki; Aoi Umeki	Poptepipic	
January 7 – March 25	Kokkoku: Moment by Moment	12	Geno Studio	Yoshimitsu Ohashi		
January 7 – March 25	Mitsuboshi Colors	12	Silver Link	Tomoyuki Kawamura		
January 7 – June 10	Cardcaptor Sakura: Clear Card	22	Madhouse	Morio Asaka		
January 7 – March 25	School Babysitters	12	Brain's Base	Shūsei Morishita	Gakuen Babysitters	
January 7 – March 25	Zoku Touken Ranbu: Hanamaru	12	Doga Kobo	Tomoaki Koshida		
January 7 – May 19	Idolish7	17	Troyca	Makoto Bessho		
January 7 – March 25	Gintama. Shirogane no Tamashii-hen	12	BN Pictures	Chizuru Miyawaki		
January 8 – March 26	Teasing Master Takagi-san	12	Shin-Ei Animation	Hiroaki Akagi		
January 8 – March 26	The Ryuo's Work Is Never Done!	12	Project No.9	Shinsuke Yanagi	Ryūō no Oshigoto!	
January 8 – June 18	Basilisk: The Ōka Ninja Scrolls	24	Seven Arcs Pictures	Junji Nishimura		
January 8 – June 25	Yowamushi Pedal: Glory Line	25	TMS/8PAN	Osamu Nabeshima		
January 10 – April 4	Overlord (season 2)	12	Madhouse	Naoyuki Ito		
January 10 – March 28	Dame×Prince Anime Caravan	12	Studio Flad	Makoto Hoshino		
January 11 – March 29	Death March to the Parallel World Rhapsody	12	Silver Link; Connect	Shin Ōnuma	Death March Kara Hajimaru Isekai Kyōsōkyoku	
January 11 – March 29	How to Keep a Mummy	12	Eight Bit	Kaori	Miira no Kaikata	
January 11 – April 25, 2019	Märchen Mädchen	12	Hoods Entertainment	Hisashi Saito; Shigeru Ueda		
January 11 – March 29	Takunomi	12	Production IMS	Tomoki Kobayashi		
January 11 – April 5	Violet Evergarden	13	Kyoto Animation	Taichi Ishidate		
January 12 – March 30	After the Rain	12	Wit Studio	Ayumu Watanabe	Koi wa Ameagari no You ni	
January 12 – March 30	Hakumei and Mikochi	12	Lerche	Masaomi Ando	Hakumei to Mikochi	
January 12 – March 30	Hakata Tonkotsu Ramens	12	Satelight	Keiji Yasuda		
January 12 – March 30	Dagashi Kashi (season 2)	12	Tezuka Productions	Satoshi Kuwabara		
January 12 – June 29	Hakyū Hōshin Engi	23	C-Station	Masahiro Aizawa		
January 13 – September 28	Beatless	24	Diomedéa	Seiji Mizushima		
January 13 – July 7	Darling in the Franxx	24	CloverWorks; Trigger	Atsushi Nishigori		
January 13 – March 31	Killing Bites	12	Liden Films	Yasuto Nishikata		
January 13 – June 30	The Seven Deadly Sins: Revival of the Commandments	24	A-1 Pictures	Takeshi Furuta	Nanatsu no Taizai: Imashime no Fukkatsu	
January 17 – June 27	The Disastrous Life of Saiki K. (season 2)	24	J.C.Staff	Hiroaki Sakurai	Saiki Kusuo no Sai-nan	
January 26 – March 30	The Seven Heavenly Virtues	10	Bridge	Shinji Ishihira	Nanatsu no Bitoku	
January 27 – July 29	Fate/Extra Last Encore	13	Shaft	Yukihiro Miyamoto; Akiyuki Shinbo		
February 4 – January 27, 2019	Hugtto! PreCure	49	Toei Animation	Junichi Sato; Akifumi Zako		
April 1 – March 29, 2020	GeGeGe no Kitarō	97	Toei Animation	Kōji Ogawa		
April 2 – June 18	Umamusume: Pretty Derby	13	P.A. Works	Kei Oikawa		
April 2 – March 25, 2019	Beyblade Burst Turbo	51	OLM	Katsuhito Akiyama	Beyblade Burst Chōzetsu	
April 2 – April 1, 2019	Captain Tsubasa	52	David Production	Toshiyuki Kato		
April 2 –	Pazudora		Pierrot	Hajime Kamegaki		
April 2 – June 18	Magical Girl Ore	12	Pierrot+	Itsuro Kawasaki	Mahō Shōjo Ore	
April 2 – September 24	Kakuriyo: Bed and Breakfast for Spirits	26	Gonzo	Yoshiki Okuda	Kakuriyo no Yadomeshi	
April 2 – June 18	Souten no Ken Re:Genesis	12	Polygon Pictures	Yoshio Kazumi		
April 2 – June 18	You Don't Know Gunma Yet	12	Asahi Production	Mankyū	Omae wa Mada Gunma o Shiranai	
April 3 – September 25	Gundam Build Divers	25	Sunrise	Shinya Watada		
April 3 – June 26	Space Battleship Tiramisu	13	Gonzo	Hiroshi Ikehata	Uchū Senkan Tiramisu	
April 3 – June 20	Tachibanakan To Lie Angle	12	Creators in Pack; Studio Lings	Hisayoshi Hirasawa		
April 3 – June 26	The Legend of the Galactic Heroes: Die Neue These Kaikō	12	Production I.G	Shunsuke Tada		
April 3 – June 19	Tokyo Ghoul:re	12	Pierrot	Odahiro Watanabe		
April 4 – June 20	Alice or Alice	12	EMT Squared	Kōsuke Kobayashi		
April 4 – September 26	Last Hope	26	Satelight; Xiamen Skyloong Media	Shoji Kawamori; Hidekazu Sato		
April 4 – September 18	Lupin the Third Part 5	24	Telecom Animation Film	Kazuhide Tomonaga; Yūichirō Yano		
April 4 – June 20	Real Girl	12	Hoods Entertainment	Takashi Naoya		
April 5 – September 26, 2019	Aikatsu Friends!	76	BN Pictures	Tatsuya Igarashi		
April 5 – June 21	Comic Girls	12	Nexus	Yoshinobu Tokumoto		
April 5 – June 28	Tada Never Falls in Love	13	Doga Kobo	Mitsue Yamazaki	Tada-kun wa Koi o Shinai	
April 5 – June 21	Dances with the Dragons	12	Seven Arcs Pictures	Hiroshi Nishikori; Hirokazu Hanai	Saredo Tsumibito wa Ryū to Odoru: Dances with the Dragons	
April 6 – September 21	Akkun to Kanojo	25	Yumeta Company	Shin Katagai		
April 6 – June 22	Gurazeni	12	Studio Deen	Ayumu Watanabe		
April 6 – June 22	Hinamatsuri	12	Feel	Kei Oikawa		
April 6 – September 28	Inazuma Eleven: Ares	26	OLM	Akihiro Hino; Yumi Kamakura		
April 6 – June 22	Lostorage conflated WIXOSS	12	J.C.Staff	Risako Yoshida		
April 6 – June 22	Magical Girl Site	12	production doA	Tadahito Matsubayashi	Mahō Shōjo Site	
April 6 – June 29	Megalo Box	13	TMS/3xCube	You Moriyama		
April 6 – September 28	Nobunaga no Shinobi: Anegawa Ishiyama-hen	26	TMS/V1 Studio	Akitaro Daichi		
April 7 – June 23	Amanchu! Advance	12	J.C.Staff	Junichi Sato; Kiyoko Sayama		
April 7 – September 29	My Hero Academia (season 3)	25	Bones	Kenji Nagasaki	Boku no Hero Academia	
April 7 – June 23	Devils' Line	12	Platinum Vision	Yoshinobu Tokumoto		
April 7 – September 22	Major 2nd	25	OLM	Ayumu Watanabe		
April 8 – June 24	Caligula	12	Satelight	Jun'ichi Wada		
April 8 – July 1	Cute High Earth Defence Club HAPPY KISS	12	Studio Comet	Shinji Takamatsu		
April 8 – June 24	Cutie Honey Universe	12	Production Reed	Akitoshi Yokoyama		
April 8 – July 1	Forest of Piano	12	Gaina	Ryūtarō Suzuki; Gaku Nakatani	Piano no Mori	
April 8 – July 1	Hozuki's Coolheadedness (season 2, part 2)	13	Studio Deen	Kazuhiro Yoneda	Hōzuki no Reitetsu	
April 8 – May 30, 2021	Kiratto Pri Chan	153	Tatsunoko Production; DongWoo A&E	Hiroshi Ikehata		
April 8 – March 31, 2019	Layton Mystery Tanteisha: Katori no Nazotoki File	50	Liden Films	Susumu Mitsunaka		
April 8 – June 24	Nil Admirari no Tenbin: Teito Genwaku Kitan	12	Zero-G	Masahiro Takata		
April 8 – September 23	Okko's Inn	24	Madhouse; DLE	Mitsuyuki Masuhara	Waka Okami wa Shōgakusei!	
April 8 – September 30	Persona 5: The Animation	26	CloverWorks	Masashi Ishihama		
April 8 – June 30	Sword Art Online Alternative Gun Gale Online	12	3Hz	Masayuki Sakoi		
April 9 – June 25	Golden Kamuy	12	Geno Studio	Hitoshi Nanba		
April 9 – June 25	Food Wars! Shokugeki no Soma: The Third Plate (season 2)	12	J.C.Staff	Yoshitomo Yonetani	Shokugeki no Sōma: San no Sara	
April 10 – June 26	Crossing Time	12	Ekachi Epilka	Yoshio Suzuki	Fumikiri Jikan	
April 10 – July 3	High School DxD Hero	12	Passione	Yoshifumi Sueda		
April 10 – June 26	Ladyspo	12		Hiroshi Kimura		
April 10 – June 26	Rokuhōdō Yotsuiro Biyori	12	Zexcs	Tomomi Kamiya		
April 11 – September 27	Steins;Gate 0	23	White Fox	Kenichi Kawamura		
April 12 – June 28	Butlers: Chitose Momotose Monogatari	12	Silver Link	Ken Takahashi		
April 12 – June 28	Last Period	12	J.C.Staff	Yoshiaki Iwasaki		
April 13 – June 29	Doreiku	12	Zero-G; TNK	Ryōichi Kuraya		
April 13 – July 19	Full Metal Panic! Invisible Victory	12	Xebec	Katsuichi Nakayama		
April 13 – June 29	Dragon Pilot: Hisone and Masotan	12	Bones	Shinji Higuchi; Hiroshi Kobayashi	Hisone to Masotan	
April 13 – June 22	Wotakoi: Love is Hard for Otaku	11	A-1 Pictures	Yoshimasa Hiraike	Wotaku ni Koi wa Muzukashii	
June 3 – July 7	FLCL Progressive	6	Production I.G; Signal.MD (#2); Production GoodBook (#5)	Katsuyuki Motohiro		
July 1 – September 16	Island	12	Feel	Keiichiro Kawaguchi		
July 2 – October 1	Hanebado!	13	Liden Films	Shinpei Ezaki		
July 2 – September 24	Encouragement of Climb (season 3)	13	Eight Bit	Yusuke Yamamoto	Yama no Susume	
July 3 – September 25	One Room (season 2)	13	Zero-G	Hiroshi Gotō; Ryōhei Suzuki; Shūichi Suzuki		
July 3 – September 25	The Thousand Musketeers	12	TMS/Double Eagle	Ken'ichi Kasai	Senjūshi	
July 4 – September 5	Back Street Girls	10	J.C.Staff	Chiaki Kon		
July 4 – December 26	Mr. Tonegawa: Middle Management Blues	24	Madhouse	Keiichiro Kawaguchi	Chūkan Kanriroku Tonegawa	
July 5 – September 20	100 Sleeping Princes and the Kingdom of Dreams	12	Project No.9	Yukina Hiiro	Yume Ōkoku to Nemureru 100-Nin no Ōji-sama	
July 5 – December 20	Banana Fish	24	MAPPA	Hiroko Utsumi		
July 5 – September 20	How Not to Summon a Demon Lord	12	Ajia-do Animation Works	Yūta Murano	Isekai Maō to Shōkan Shōjo no Dorei Majutsu	
July 5 – September 20	Miss Caretaker of Sunohara-sou	12	Silver Link	Shin Ōnuma; Mirai Minato	Sunohara-sō no Kanrinin-san	
July 5 – December 27	BanG Dream! Girls Band Party! Pico	26	Sanzigen; DMM.futureworks			
July 6 – September 21	Seven Senses of the Re'Union	12	Lerche	Yoshihito Nishōji	Shichisei no Subaru	
July 6 – September 21	Angels of Death	12	J.C.Staff	Kentarō Suzuki	Satsuriku no Tenshi	
July 6 – September 21	Chio's School Road	12	Diomedéa	Takayuki Inagaki	Chio-chan no Tsūgakuro	
July 6 – September 21	Harukana Receive	12	C2C	Toshiyuki Kubooka		
July 6 – September 21	Ongaku Shōjo	12	Studio Deen	Yukio Nishimoto		
July 7 – January 5, 2019	Oshiete Mahō no Pendulum: Rilu Rilu Fairilu	26	Studio Deen	Chisei Maeda		
July 7 – June 29, 2019	Zoids Wild	50	OLM	Norihiko Sudō		
July 8 – September 30	Cells at Work!	13	David Production	Kenichi Suzuki	Hataraku Saibō	
July 8 – September 23	The Master of Ragnarok & Blesser of Einherjar	12	EMT Squared	Kōsuke Kobayashi	Hyakuren no Haō to Seiyaku no Valkyria	
July 8 – September 23	Asobi Asobase	12	Lerche	Seiji Kishi		
July 8 – October 7	Gintama. Shirogane no Tamashii-hen (season 2)	14	BN Pictures	Chizuru Miyawaki		
July 8 – September 23	Planet With	12	J.C.Staff	Yōhei Suzuki		
July 9 – September 17	Dropkick on My Devil!	11	Nomad	Hikaru Sato	Jashin-chan Dropkick	
July 9 – September 24	Holmes of Kyoto	12	Seven	Noriyoshi Sasaki	Kyōto Teramachi Sanjō no Holmes	
July 10 – September 25	Agū: Tensai Ningyō	12	Studio Deen	Bob Shirahata		
July 10 – September 25	Phantom in the Twilight	12	Liden Films	Kunihiro Mori		
July 10 – September 25	Shinya! Tensai Bakabon	12	Pierrot+	Toru Hosokawa		
July 11 – October 2	Overlord (season 3)	13	Madhouse	Naoyuki Ito		
July 11 – September 26	Angolmois: Record of Mongol Invasion	12	NAZ	Takayuki Kuriyama	Angolmois: Genkō Kassen-ki	
July 11 – September 26	Free! (season 3)	12	Kyoto Animation; Animation Do	Eisaku Kawanami		
July 12 – September 27	Revue Starlight	12	Kinema Citrus	Tomohiro Furukawa	Shōjo Kageki Revue Starlight	
July 12 – September 27	Sirius the Jaeger	12	P.A. Works	Masahiro Ando		
July 13 – September 28	High Score Girl	12	J.C.Staff	Yoshiki Yamakawa		
July 13 – September 28	Lord of Vermilion: The Crimson King	12	Asread; Tear Studio	Eiji Suganuma	Lord of Vermilion: Guren no Ō	
July 14 – September 29	Grand Blue	12	Zero-G	Shinji Takamatsu		
July 14 – September 29	Happy Sugar Life	12	Ezo'la	Keizō Kusakawa; Nobuyoshi Nagayama		
July 14 – September 29	Yuuna and the Haunted Hot Springs	12	Xebec	Tsuyoshi Nagasawa	Yuragi-sō no Yūna-san	
July 22 – October 14	Tsukumogami Kashimasu	12	Telecom Animation Film	Masahiko Murata		
July 23 – October 15	Attack on Titan (season 3, part 1)	12	Wit Studio	Tetsurō Araki; Masashi Koizuka	Shingeki no Kyojin	
August 3 – October 19	Muhyo & Roji's Bureau of Supernatural Investigation	12	Studio Deen	Nobuhiro Kondo	Muhyo to Roji no Mahōritsu Sōdan Jimusho	
September 8 – October 13	FLCL Alternative	6	Production I.G; NUT; Revoroot	Katsuyuki Motohiro		
September 30 – December 23	Double Decker! Doug & Kirill	13	Sunrise	Joji Furuta		
October 1 – December 17	Souten no Ken Re:Genesis (season 2)	12	Polygon Pictures	Yoshio Kazumi		
October 1 – December 17	The Girl in Twilight	12	Dandelion Animation Studio; Jūmonji	Jin Tamamura; Yūichi Abe	Akanesasu Shōjo	
October 1 – December 24	Xuan Yuan Sword Luminary	13	Studio Deen	Hiroshi Watanabe	Ken En Ken: Aoki Kagayaki	
October 2 – March 26, 2019	Bakutsuri Bar Hunter	25	Toei Animation	Kenji Seto		
October 2 – March 26, 2019	Run with the Wind	23	Production I.G	Kazuya Nomura	Kaze ga Tsuyoku Fuiteiru	
October 2 – December 25	Space Battleship Tiramisu (season 2)	13	Gonzo	Hiroshi Ikehata	Uchū Senkan Tiramisu Zwei	
October 2 – March 19, 2019	That Time I Got Reincarnated as a Slime	24	Eight Bit	Yasuhito Kikuchi	Tensei shitara Slime Datta Ken	
October 2 – December 18	Jingai-san no Yome	12	Saetta	Hisayoshi Hirasawa; Takumi Shibata		
October 3 – December 19	RErideD: Derrida, who leaps through time	12	Geek Toys	Takuya Satō	RErideD: Koku Koe no Derrida	
October 4 – December 20	Between the Sky and Sea	12	TMS/Double Eagle	Atsushi Nigorikawa	Sora to Umi no Aida	
October 4 – December 20	Devidol!	12		Souta Suguhara		
October 4 – December 20	Gakuen Basara	12	Brain's Base	Minoru Ohama		
October 4 – December 27	Rascal Does Not Dream of Bunny Girl Senpai	13	CloverWorks	Sōichi Masui	Seishun Buta Yarō wa Bunny Girl-senpai no Yume o Minai	
October 4 – December 20	Zombie Land Saga	12	MAPPA	Munehisa Sakai		
October 5 – April 5, 2019	A Certain Magical Index (season 3)	26	J.C.Staff	Hiroshi Nishikiori	Toaru Majutsu no Index	
October 5 – December 21	Bakumatsu	12	Studio Deen	Masaki Watanabe		
October 5 – December 28	Bloom Into You	13	Troyca	Makoto Katō	Yagate Kimi ni Naru	
October 5 – December 28	Dakaichi	13	CloverWorks	Naoyuki Tatsuwa	Dakaretai Otoko 1-i ni Odosarete Imasu.	
October 5 – December 21	Gurazeni (season 2)	12	Studio Deen	Ayumu Watanabe		
October 5 – March 29, 2019	Hinomaru Sumo	24	Gonzo	Kōnosuke Uda; Yasutaka Yamamoto	Hinomaru Zumō	
October 5 – September 27, 2019	Inazuma Eleven: Orion no Kokuin	49	OLM	Yumi Kamakura		
October 5 – July 28, 2019	JoJo's Bizarre Adventure: Golden Wind	39	David Production	Naokatsu Tsuda	JoJo no Kimyō na Bōken Ōgon no Kaze	
October 5 – March 22, 2019	Okoshiyasu, Chitose-chan	24	Gathering	Kyō Yatate		
October 5 – December 21	Ms. Vampire who lives in my neighborhood.	12	Studio Gokumi; AXsiZ	Noriyaki Akitaya	Tonari no Kyūketsuki-san	
October 5 – December 21	Uchi no Maid ga Uzasugiru!	12	Doga Kobo	Masahiko Ohta		
October 5 – December 21	Voice of Fox	12	Yumeta Company	Kōjin Ochi	Kitsune no Koe	
October 6 – March 30, 2019	Ace Attorney (season 2)	23	CloverWorks	Ayumu Watanabe	Gyakuten Saiban: Sono "Shinjitsu", Igiari!	
October 6 – December 22	Boarding School Juliet	12	Liden Films	Seiki Takuno	Kishuku Gakkō no Juliet	
October 6 – December 29	Iroduku: The World in Colors	13	P.A. Works	Toshiya Shinohara	Irozuku Sekai no Ashita kara	
October 6 – March 30, 2019	Pingu in the City (season 2)	26	Dandelion Animation Studio; Polygon Pictures	Naomi Iwata		
October 6 – February 23, 2019	Radiant	21	Lerche	Daisei Fukuoka; Seiji Kishi		
October 6 – December 22	Sono Toki, Kanojo wa.	12	Master Lights	Susumu Banba		
October 7 – December 23	Anima Yell!	12	Doga Kobo	Masako Sato		
October 7 – September 29, 2019	Fairy Tail (season 9)	51	A-1 Pictures; Bridge; CloverWorks	Shinji Ishihira		
October 7 – December 30	Goblin Slayer	12	White Fox	Takaharu Ozaki		
October 7 – December 23	Release the Spyce	12	Lay-duce	Yō Satō		
October 7 – December 23	SSSS.Gridman	12	Trigger	Akira Amemiya		
October 7 – March 31, 2019	Sword Art Online: Alicization	24	A-1 Pictures	Manabu Ono		
October 7 – December 30	Ulysses: Jeanne d'Arc and the Alchemist Knight	12	AXsiZ	Shin Itagaki	Ulysses: Jeanne d'Arc to Renkin no Kishi	
October 8 – December 24	Skull-face Bookseller Honda-san	12	DLE	Owl Todoroki	Gaikotsu Shotenin Honda-san	
October 8 – December 24	Golden Kamuy (season 2)	12	Geno Studio	Hitoshi Nanba		
October 8 – December 24	Himote House	12	Bouncy	Koutarō Ishidate		
October 9 – October 30	Hashiri Tsuzukete Yokattatte.	4	Signal.MD	Masatsugu Arakawa		
October 9 – December 25	The Idolmaster SideM Wake Atte Mini!	12	Zero-G	Mankyū		
October 9 – December 25	Tokyo Ghoul:re (season 2)	12	Pierrot	Odahiro Watanabe		
October 10 – December 26	Conception	12	Gonzo	Keitaro Motonaga		
October 10 – December 19	My Sister, My Writer	10	NAZ; Magia Doraglier	Hiroyuki Furukawa	Ore ga Suki nano wa Imōto dakedo Imōto ja nai	
October 11 – December 27	As Miss Beelzebub Likes	12	Liden Films	Minato Kazuto	Beelzebub-jō no Okinimesu Mama.	
October 11 – June 27, 2019	Karakuri Circus	36	Studio VOLN	Satoshi Nishimura		
October 11 – December 27	Merc Storia: The Apathetic Boy and the Girl in a Bottle	12	Encourage Films	Fumitoshi Oizaki	Merc Storia: Mukiryoku no Shōnen to Bin no Naka no Shōjo	
October 12 – December 28	Senran Kagura (season 2)	12	TNK	Tetsuya Yanagisawa		
October 18 – December 27	Ingress: The Animation	11	Craftar	Yūhei Sakuragi		
October 22 – January 21, 2019	Tsurune	13	Kyoto Animation	Takuya Yamamura		
October 25 – December 27	Million Arthur	10	J.C.Staff	Yōhei Suzuki	Operation Han-Gyaku-Sei Million Arthur	

=== Original net animations ===
A list of original net animations that debuted between January 1 and December 31, 2018.

First run start and end dates	Title	Episodes	Studio	Director	Original title	Ref
January 5	Devilman Crybaby	10	Science Saru	Masaaki Yuasa		
January 9 – March 27	Kaiju Girls (season 2)	12	Studio Puyukai	Minoru Ashina; Junichi Inaba		
January 20 – August 18	Tomica Hyper Rescue Drive Head Kidō Kyūkyū Keisatsu	8	OLM; Xebec	Takao Kato		
February 9 – May 15	Tanuki to Kitsune	20	Lesprit	Tomohiro Tsukimisato		
March 2	B: The Beginning	12	Production I.G	Kazuto Nakazawa; Yoshinobu Yamakawa		
March 9	A.I.C.O. -Incarnation-	12	Bones	Kazuya Murata		
March 23	Sword Gai: The Animation	12	LandQ Studios	Takahiro Ikezoe; Tomohito Naka		
March 31 – June 16	Lost Song	12	Liden Films	Junpei Morita		
April 13 – September 14	Isekai Izakaya "Nobu"	24	Sunrise	Katsumi Ono		
April 20	Aggretsuko	10	Fanworks	Rarecho	Aggressive Retsuko	
June 25 – December 17	Baki	26	TMS/Double Eagle	Toshiki Hirano		
July 1 –	Super Dragon Ball Heroes		Toei Animation		Sūpā Doragon Bōru Hīrōzu	
July 4	Calamity of a Zombie Girl	1	Gonzo; Stingray	Hideaki Iwami	Aru Zombie Shōjo no Sainan	
July 30	Sword Gai: The Animation (season 2)	12	LandQ Studios	Takahiro Ikezoe; Tomohito Naka		
October 8 – December 24	Armor Shop for Ladies & Gentlemen	12	IMAGICA Image Works	Junichi Yamamoto	Otona no Bōguya-san	
December 3	Hero Mask	15	Pierrot	Hiroyasu Aoki		
December 10 – February 18, 2019	Saint Seiya: Saintia Shō	10	Gonzo	Masato Tamagawa		

=== Original video animations ===
A list of original video animations that debuted between January 1 and December 31, 2018.

First run start and end dates	Title	Episodes	Studio	Director	Original title	Ref
March 28	The Testament of Sister New Devil Departures	1	Production IMS	Hisashi Saito	Shinmai Maō no Testament Departures	
June 9	Kase-san and Morning Glories	1	Zexcs	Takuya Satō	Asagao to Kase-san.	
July 13	Queen's Blade: Unlimited (1st OVA)	1	FORTES	Gabi Kisaragi		
October 6	Re:Zero − Starting Life in Another World: Memory Snow	1	White Fox	Tatsuya Koyanagi; Masaharu Watanabe	Re:Zero kara Hajimeru Isekai Seikatsu: Memory Snow	
November 9	Love and Lies	2	Liden Films	Seiki Takuno	Koi to Uso	
November 30	Drifters: The Outlandish Knight	1	Hoods Drifters Studio	Kenichi Suzuki		

== See also ==
- 2018 in Japanese television
- 2018 in South Korea
- 2018 in television
