= Mamoru Miyano filmography =

Mamoru Miyano (宮野 真守, Miyano Mamoru) is a Japanese actor and singer, known for his voice roles in anime series and films, specials, original video animation, and video games. He is best known for his roles in Steins;Gate, Durarara!!, Death Note, Soul Eater, Wolf's Rain, Ouran High School Host Club, Ajin: Demi-Human, Fullmetal Alchemist: Brotherhood, Free!, Mobile Suit Gundam 00, Hunter x Hunter, Chihayafuru, Bungo Stray Dogs, Uta no Prince-sama and Zombieland Saga. Miyano won the Best Voice Actor award at the 2008 Tokyo International Anime Fair. At the 2nd Seiyu Awards, he won Best Lead Actor Award for his role as Setsuna F. Seiei in Mobile Suit Gundam 00 and Hakugen Rikuson in Kōtetsu Sangokushi.

== Anime series ==
Year	Title	Role	Awards	Ref.
2002	Shin Megami Tensei: Devil Children - Light & Dark	Akira		
2003	Wolf's Rain	Kiba		
2004	Gakuen Alice	Nodacchi		
2004	Hit o Nerae!	Naoto Oizumi		
2004	Kurau Phantom Memory	Ted		
2004	Love Love?	Naoto Oizumi		
2004	Yu-Gi-Oh! GX	Abidos the Third		
2004	Zipang	Katsutoshi Hayashibara		
2005	Eureka Seven	Moondoggie		
2005	Eyeshield 21	Haruto Sakuraba		
2005	Jinki: Extend	Kouse		
2005	Suzuka	Kazuki Tsuda		
2006	Crash B-Daman	Joe Fukairi		
2006	D.Gray-man	Chaoji Han		
2006	Death Note	Light Yagami	Best Voice Actor	
2006	Mobile Suit Gundam SEED C.E. 73: Stargazer	Shams Cōza		
2006	Ouran High School Host Club	Tamaki Suoh		
2006	Project Blue Earth SOS	Bucky		
2006	Tokimeki Memorial Only Love	Riku Aoba		
2007	Big Windup!	Riō Nakazawa		
2007	Buzzer Beater 2nd Season	Young Yoshimune		
2007	Dragonaut: The Resonance	Asim Jamar		
2007	El Cazador de la Bruja	L.A.		
2007	Kōtetsu Sangokushi	Rikuson Hakugen	Best Lead Actor	
2007	Mobile Suit Gundam 00	Setsuna F. Seiei	Best Voice Actor	
2008	Antique Bakery	Eiji Kanda		
2008	Kurozuka	Kuro		
2008	Kyo Kara Maoh! 3rd Series	Del Kierson von Wincott		
2008	Mobile Suit Gundam 00 Second Season	Setsuna F. Seiei	Best Lead Actor	
2008	Rental Magica	Fin Cruda		
2008	Sands of Destruction	Kyrie Illunis		
2008	Skip-Beat!	Shō Fuwa		
2008	Soul Eater	Death the Kid		
2008	The Earl and the Fairy	Ulysses		
2008	Vampire Knight	Zero Kiryu, Ichiru Kiryu		
2009	Aoi Bungaku Series	Kandata		
2009	Fullmetal Alchemist: Brotherhood	Ling Yao		
2009	Inazuma Eleven	Shirō Fubuki, Atsuya Fubuki, Tōru Kadomichi, Shirai Ikkaku, Izuno Yuu, John Jones, Yukihito Karasu, Astaroth, Cain Saito		
2009	Jewelpet	Keigo Tatewaki		
2009	Sōten Kōro	Cao Cao		
2010	Big Windup! 2	Riō Nakazawa		
2010	Durarara!!	Masaomi Kida		
2010	Highschool of the Dead	Hisashi Igō		
2010	Pokémon: Best Wishes!	Cilan/Dent		
2010	Star Driver: Kagayaki no Takuto	Takuto Tsunashi		
2010	Starry Sky	Shiki Kagurazaka		
2010	The Betrayal Knows My Name	Shuusei Usui		
2010	Tono to Issho: Ippunkan Gekijou	Yoshikage Asakura		
2011	Ben-To	Yū Kaneshiro		
2011	Chihayafuru	Taichi Mashima		
2011	Dog Days	Cinque Izumi		
2011	Inazuma Eleven GO	Shirō Fubuki		
2011	Kimi ni Todoke 2nd Season	Kento Miura		
2011	Phi Brain: Puzzle of God	Bishop		
2011	Steins;Gate	Rintaro Okabe		
2011	Uta no Prince-sama Maji Love 1000%	Tokiya Ichinose – Hayato		
2012	Dog Days'	Cinque Izumi		
2012	Hunter × Hunter	Chrollo Lucilfer		
2012	Inu x Boku SS	Zange Natsume		
2012	K	Saruhiko Fushimi		
2012	Natsuiro Kiseki	Takashi Sano		
2012	Phi-Brain - Puzzle of God: The Orpheus Order	Bishop		
2012	Pokémon: Best Wishes! Season 2	Cilan/Dent		
2012	Saint Seiya Omega	Cygnus Hyōga		
2012	Shirokuma Cafe	Alpaca, Crested Porcupine		
2012	Wooser's Hand-to-Mouth Life	Wooser		
2012	Yu-Gi-Oh! Zexal II	Daisuke Katagiri		
2012	Zetman	Kouga Amagi		
2013	Arata: The Legend	Yataka		
2013	Battle Spirits: Saikyou Ginga Ultimate Zero	Tsuruhashi the Waking		
2013	Chihayafuru 2	Taichi Mashima		
2013	Free! – Iwatobi Swim Club	Rin Matsuoka		
2013	Gatchaman Crowds	Berg Katze		
2013	Hajime no Ippo: Rising	Young Kamogawa Genji		
2013	Karneval	Yogi		
2013	Magi: The Kingdom of Magic	Muu Alexius		
2013	Mushibugyō	Kotori Matsunohara		
2013	Phi Brain: Puzzle of God 3	Bishop		
2013	Pokémon: Best Wishes! Season 2: Episode N	Cilan/Dent		
2013	Pokémon: Best Wishes! Season 2: Decolora Adventure	Cilan/Dent		
2013	Red Data Girl	Yoshiki Hayakawa		
2013	Uta no Prince-sama Maji Love 2000%	Tokiya Ichinose		
2013	Valvrave the Liberator	H-neun		
2013	Valvrave the Liberator 2nd Season	H-neun		
2014	Black Butler: Book of Circus	Joker		
2014	Cardfight!! Vanguard G	Kouji Ibuki		
2014	Cross Ange	Tusk		
2014	Free! Eternal Summer	Rin Matsuoka		
2014	La Corda d'Oro: Blue Sky	Sei Amamiya		
2014	Magic Kaito 1412	Saguru Hakuba		
2014	Magical Warfare	Takeshi Nanase		
2014	Mekakucity Actors	Konoha / Haruka Kokonose		
2014	Monthly Girls' Nozaki-kun	Saburo Suzuki		
2014	Nobunaga Concerto	Saburō		
2014	Nobunaga the Fool	Nobunaga Oda		
2014	Soul Eater Not!	Death the Kid		
2014	The Seven Deadly Sins	Gilthunder		
2014	Tokyo Ghoul	Shuu Tsukiyama		
2014	Wooser's Hand-to-Mouth Life: Awakening Arc	Wooser		
2015	Assassination Classroom	Gakushū Asano		
2015	Blood Blockade Battlefront	Dog Hummer		
2015	Cardfight!! Vanguard G: GIRS Crisis	Kouji Ibuki		
2015	Death Parade	Harada (C.H.A)		
2015	Dog Days"	Cinque Izumi		
2015	Durarara!! x2 Shou	Masaomi Kida		
2015	Durarara!! x2 Ten	Masaomi Kida		
2015	Gatchaman Crowds Insight	Berg Katze		
2015	K: Return of Kings	Saruhiko Fushimi		
2015	One-Punch Man	Sweet Mask		
2015	Overlord	Pandora's Actor		
2015	Pretty Guardian Sailor Moon Crystal	Prince Demande		
2015	Rainy Cocoa	Ryota Sakuragi		
2015	Show by Rock!!	Shu Zo		
2015	Tokyo Ghoul √A	Shuu Tsukiyama		
2015	Ushio and Tora	Giryō		
2015	Uta no Prince-sama Maji Love Revolutions	Tokiya Ichinose		
2015	Wooser's Hand-to-Mouth Life: Phantasmagoric Arc	Wooser, Ultraman Zero (ep 1)		
2015	Young Black Jack	Maruo Hyakki		
2016	Ajin: Demi-Human	Kei Nagai		
2016	Ajin: Demi-Human 2nd Season	Kei Nagai		
2016	Assassination Classroom 2nd Season	Gakushū Asano		
2016	Brotherhood: Final Fantasy XV	Ignis Scientia		
2016	Bungo Stray Dogs	Osamu Dazai		
2016	Bungo Stray Dogs 2	Osamu Dazai		
2016	Cardfight!! Vanguard G: NEXT	Kouji Ibuki		
2016	Cardfight!! Vanguard G: Stride Gate	Kouji Ibuki		
2016	Days	Kiichi Ōshiba		
2016	Durarara!! x2 Ketsu	Masaomi Kida		
2016	Kabaneri of the Iron Fortress	Biba Amatori		
2016	Prince of Stride: Alternative	Reiji Suwa		
2016	Rainy Cocoa in Hawaii	Ryota Sakuragi		
2016	Scared Rider Xechs	Takuto Kirisawa		
2016	Show by Rock!!♯	Shu Zo		
2016	Show By Rock!! Short!!	Shu Zo		
2016	The Seven Deadly Sins: Signs of Holy War	Gilthunder		
2016	Ushio and Tora 2nd Season	Giryō		
2016	Uta no Prince-sama Maji Love Legend Star	Tokiya Ichinose		
2016	Yuri!!! on Ice	Jean-Jacques Leroy		
2017	ACCA: 13-ku Kansatsu-ka	Schwann		
2017	Blood Blockade Battlefront & Beyond	Dog Hummer		
2017	Cardfight!! Vanguard G: Z	Kouji Ibuki		
2017	King's Game The Animation	Nobuaki Kanazawa		
2017	Rage of Bahamut: Virgin Soul	Painter		
2017	Rainy Cocoa: Ame-con!!	Ryota Sakuragi		
2017	Yowamushi Pedal: New Generation	Ashikiba Takuto		
2018	Cardfight!! Vanguard Prime	Kouji Ibuki		
2018	Devils' Line	Tamaki Anzai		
2018	Free!: Dive to the Future	Rin Matsuoka		
2018	Inazuma Eleven: Ares	Shirō Fubuki, Atsuya Fubuki		
2018	Inazuma Eleven: Orion no Kokuin	Shirō Fubuki, Atsuya Fubuki		
2018	Legend of the Galactic Heroes: The New Thesis	Reinhard von Lohengramm		
2018	Persona 5: The Animation	Ryuji Sakamoto		
2018	Soreike! Anpanman	Crepeman		
2018	Steins;Gate 0	Rintaro Okabe		
2018	Tada Never Falls in Love	Kaoru Ijūin		
2018	The Seven Deadly Sins: Revival of the Commandments	Gilthunder, Gilfrost		
2018	Tokyo Ghoul:re	Shuu Tsukiyama		
2018	Tokyo Ghoul:re 2nd Season	Shuu Tsukiyama		
2018	Yowamushi Pedal: Glory Line	Ashikiba Takuto		
2018	Zombie Land Saga	Kōtarō Tatsumi		
2019	Ahiru no Sora	Kaname Shigeyoshi		
2019	Bungo Stray Dogs 3	Osamu Dazai		
2019	Carole & Tuesday	Ertegun		
2019	Chihayafuru 3	Taichi Mashima		
2019	Fire Force	Benimaru Shinmon		
2019	Isekai Quartet	Pandora's Actor		
2019	One-Punch Man 2	Sweet Mask		
2019	Psycho-Pass 3	Shizuka Homura		
2019	Sarazanmai	Reo Niiboshi		
2020	Fire Force 2nd Season	Benimaru Shinmon		
2020	Haikyu!! To The Top	Atsumu Miya		
2020	In/Spectre	Kuro Sakuragawa		
2020	Isekai Quartet 2	Pandora's Actor		
2020	The Millionaire Detective Balance: Unlimited	Haru Katō		
2021	Bungo Stray Dogs Wan!	Osamu Dazai		
2021	Life Lessons with Uramichi Oniisan	Iketeru Daga		
2021	Show by Rock!! Stars!!	Shu Zo		
2021	Zombie Land Saga Revenge	Kōtarō Tatsumi, Kiichi Momozaki		
2022	Demon Slayer: Kimetsu no Yaiba – Entertainment District Arc	Dōma		
2022	The Prince of Tennis II: U-17 World Cup	Ryōga Echizen		
2022	Tiger & Bunny 2nd Season	Fugan		
2022	Urusei Yatsura	Shutaro Mendo		
2022	Overlord IV	Pandora's Actor		
2023	Bungo Stray Dogs 4	Osamu Dazai		
2023	Bungo Stray Dogs 5	Osamu Dazai		
2023	Demon Slayer: Kimetsu no Yaiba – Swordsmith Village Arc	Dōma		
2023	In/Spectre 2nd Season	Kuro Sakuragawa		
2023	The Fire Hunter	Takimi		
2023	The Marginal Service	Brian Nightraider		
2023	Undead Girl Murder Farce	Arsène Lupin		
2024	Blue Lock vs. U-20 Japan	Michael Kaiser		
2024	Chibi Godzilla Raids Again	Chibi Gigan		
2024	Kinnikuman Perfect Origin Arc	Kinnikuman		
2024	Oblivion Battery	Kei Kaname		
2024	Oshi no Ko 2nd Season	Hikaru Kamiki		
2024	Ranma ½	Mikado Sanzenin		
2024	The Fire Hunter 2	Takimi		
2025	Black Butler: Emerald Witch Arc	Joker		
2025	Blue Miburo	Kyōhachi Yōtarō		
2025	Clevatess	Stefan		
2025	Fire Force 3rd Season	Shinmon Benimaru		
2025	Gachiakuta	August Stilza		
2025	Lazarus	Axel		
2025	My Hero Academia: Final Season	Giulio Gandini		
2025	The Dinner Table Detective	Kyōichirō Kazamatsuri		
2025	To Be Hero X	X		
2025	Zenshu	Ultimate Exister		

== Anime specials ==
Year	Series	Role	Ref.
2005	Soukyuu no Fafner: Right of Left	Ryō Masaoka	
2007	Death Note: Relight - Visions of a God	Light Yagami	
2008	Death Note: Relight 2 - L's Successors	Light Yagami	
2008	Mobile Suit Gundam 00: Tenshitachi no Kiseki	Setsuna F. Seiei	
2013	Pokémon: Mewtwo - Prologue to Awakening	Cilan/Dent	
2013	Pokémon Best Wishes Season 2 Special, Dent and Takeshi! Gyarados's Outrage!!	Cilan/Dent	
2016	Pokémon: XY&Z Specials	Cilan/Dent	
2016	Persona 5: The Animation – The Day Breakers	Ryuji Sakamoto	
2018	Persona 5 The Animation: Dark Sun...	Ryuji Sakamoto	
2019	Persona 5 The Animation: Stars and Ours	Ryuji Sakamoto	

== Original net animation (ONA) & Original video animation (OVA) ==
Year	Series	Role	Ref.
2004	Wolf's Rain	Kiba	
2007	Tokimeki Memorial: Only Love Specials	Riku Aoba	
2008	Dragonaut: The Resonance - Kotou - Tozasareta Kyousoo	Asim Jamar	
2008	The Earl and the Fairy Specials	Ulysses	
2008	Tsubasa Tokyo Revelations	Kamui	
2009	La Corda d'Oro: Secondo Passo	Aoi Kaji	
2009	Fullmetal Alchemist: Brotherhood - 4-Koma Theater	Ling Yao	
2009	Mobile Suit Gundam 00 Special Edition	Setsuna F. Seiei	
2010	Boku, Otaryman.	Yoshitani	
2010	Bungaku Shoujo Memoire	Ryuuto Sakurai	
2010	Durarara!! OVA	Masaomi Kida	
2010	Tono to Issho	Asakura Yoshikage	
2011	Fate/Prototype	Rider/Perseus	
2011	Kimi ni Todoke 2nd Season OVA	Kento Miura	
2012	Steins;Gate: Oukoubakko no Poriomania	Rintaro Okabe	
2012	Inu x Boku SS Special	Zange Natsume	
2013	Arata: The Legend Picture Drama	Yataka	
2013	Chihayafuru 2: Waga Mi Yo ni Furu Nagame Seshi Ma ni	Taichi Mashima	
2013	Free!: FrFr - Short Movie	Rin Matsuoka	
2013	Karneval OVA	Yogi	
2013	Uta no Prince-sama Maji Love 2000%: Shining Star Xmas	Tokiya Ichinose	
2013	Wooser's Hand-to-Mouth Life Special	Wooser	
2014	Gatchaman Crowds: Embrace	Berg Katze	
2014	Mushibugyou OVA	Kotori Matsunohara	
2014	Monthly Girls' Nozaki-kun Specials	Saburo Suzuki	
2014	New Prince of Tennis OVA Vs. Genius 10	Ryoga Echizen	
2014	Steins;Gate: Soumei Eichi no Cognitive Computing	Rintaro Okabe	
2014	Sushi Ninja	Tamago	
2015	Assassination Classroom - Koro-sensei Quest!	Gakushū Asano	
2015	Free!: Eternal Summer – Kindan no All Hard!	Rin Matsuoka	
2015	Hakuouki Shinkai: Kaze no Shou	Hachirou Iba	
2015	Osiris no Tenbin		
2015	Steins;Gate: Kyoukaimenjou no Missing Link - Divide By Zero	Rintaro Okabe	
2015	The Seven Deadly Sins: Ban's Side Story	Gilthunder	
2015	Tokyo Ghoul: Pinto	Shuu Tsukiyama	
2016	Assassination Classroom: Extracurricular Lesson	Gakushū Asano	
2016	Osiris no Tenbin 2		
2016	Overlord: Ple Ple Pleiades	Pandora's Actor	
2016	Shiritsu Liyon Gakuen	Liyonel Tezukayama	
2017	Bungo Stray Dogs: Hitori Ayumu	Osamu Dazai	
2018	Steins;Gate 0: Valentine's of Crystal Polymorphism -Bittersweet Intermedio-	Rintaro Okabe	
2018	Tales of HR	Flynn Scifo	
2019	Carole & Tuesday Specials	Ertegun	
2019	Levius	Dr. Crown	
2020	Oblivion Battery	Kei Kaname	
2022	Onna no Sono no Hoshi	Kobayashi	
2023	Ōoku: The Inner Chambers	Madenokōji Arikoto	
2023	Pluto	Epsilon	
2023	Gamera Rebirth	Tazaki	
2024	Kimi ni Todoke 3rd Season	Kento Miura	
2024	Time Patrol Bon	Buyoyon	
2026	Dandelion	Seiki Kyōkawa	
2026	Cyborg 009: Nemesis	Cyborg 009 / Jet Link	

== Anime films ==
Year	Series	Role	Ref.
2005	Soukyuu no Fafner: Right of Left	Ryō Masaoka	
2007	Sword of the Stranger	Juurouta Inui	
2009	Eureka Seven: Good Night, Sleep Tight, Young Lovers	Moondoggie	
2009	Tales of Vesperia: The First Strike	Flynn Scifo	
2010	Book Girl	Ryuto Sakurai	
2010	Inazuma Eleven: Saikyō Gundan Ōga Shūrai	Shirō Fubuki	
2010	Mobile Suit Gundam 00 the Movie: Awakening of the Trailblazer	Setsuna F. Seiei	
2010	Planzet	Taishi Akejima	
2011	009 Re:Cyborg	Joe Shimamura	
2011	Fusé: Teppō Musume no Torimonochō	Shino	
2011	Inazuma Eleven GO: Kyūkyoku no Kizuna Gurifon	Shirō Fubuki	
2011	Inazuma Eleven GO vs. Danbōru Senki W	Shirō Fubuki	
2011	Pokémon the Movie: White—Victini and Zekrom	Cilan/Dent	
2011	Pokémon the Movie: Black—Victini and Reshiram	Cilan/Dent	
2011	Pokémon the Movie: Kyurem vs. the Sword of Justice	Cilan/Dent	
2011	Tekken: Blood Vengeance	Shin Kamiya	
2013	Pokémon the Movie: Genesect and the Legend Awakened	Cilan/Dent	
2013	Steins;Gate: Fuka Ryōiki no Déjà vu	Rintaro Okabe	
2013	Hal	Ryu	
2013	Hunter x Hunter: Phantom Rouge	Chrollo Lucilfer	
2013	Star Driver the Movie	Takuto Tsunashi	
2014	Cardfight!! Vanguard Movie: Neon Messiah	Kouji Ibuki	
2014	K: Missing Kings	Saruhiko Fushimi	
2014	New Initial D the Movie: Legend 1 – Awakening	Takumi Fujiwara	
2015	Ajin Part 1: Shōdō	Kei Nagai	
2015	High Speed!: Free! Starting Days	Rin Matsuoka	
2015	New Initial D the Movie: Legend 2 – Racer	Takumi Fujiwara	
2015	The Boy and the Beast	Ichirōhiko	
2015	Yowamushi Pedal Movie	Shin Yoshimoto	
2016	Ajin Part 2: Collision	Kei Nagai	
2016	Ajin Part 3: Clash	Kei Nagai	
2016	Kingsglaive: Final Fantasy XV	Ignis Scientia	
2016	New Initial D the Movie: Legend 3 – Dream	Takumi Fujiwara	
2017	Blame!	Sutezō	
2017	Fireworks	Yūsuke Azumi	
2017	Free! Timeless Medley	Rin Matsuoka	
2017	Free! Take Your Marks	Rin Matsuoka	
2017	Godzilla: Planet of the Monsters	Haruo Sakaki	
2017	Haikara-san ga Tōru: Part 1	Shinobu Ijūin	
2018	Bungo Stray Dogs: Dead Apple	Osamu Dazai	
2018	Godzilla: City on the Edge of Battle	Haruo Sakaki	
2018	Godzilla: The Planet Eater	Haruo Sakaki	
2018	Haikara-san ga Tōru: Part 2	Shinobu Ijūin	
2018	Hugtto! Pretty Cure Futari wa Pretty Cure: All Stars Memories	Miden	
2018	K: Seven Stories Movie 4 - Lost Small World	Saruhiko Fushimi	
2019	Free! Road to the World - The Dream	Rin Matsuoka	
2019	Human Lost	Yozo Oba	
2019	Legend of the Galactic Heroes: The New Thesis Stellar War	Reinhard von Lohengramm	
2019	Lupin the IIIrd: Mine Fujiko no Uso	Bincam	
2019	NiNoKuni	Yoki Gnauss	
2019	Uta no Prince-sama: Maji Love Kingdom	Tokiya Ichinose	
2020	Fate/Grand Order - Divine Realm of the Round Table: Camelot ~ Wandering; Agaterám ~	Bedivere	
2020	Psycho-Pass 3: First Inspector	Shizuka Homura	
2021	Belle	Hitokawamuitarō / Guttokoraemaru	
2021	Bright: Samurai Soul	Rōshu	
2021	Eureka: Eureka Seven Hi-Evolution	Moondoggie	
2021	Fate/Grand Order - Divine Realm of the Round Table: Camelot ~ Paladin; Agaterám ~	Bedivere	
2021	Free! The Final Stroke	Rin Matsuoka	
2022	Bubble	Shin	
2022	Dragon Ball Super: Super Hero	Gamma #2	
2022	Legend of the Galactic Heroes: The New Thesis Clash	Reinhard von Lohengramm	
2022	Uta no Prince-sama: Maji Love ST☆RISH Tours	Tokiya Ichinose	
2024	My Hero Academia: You're Next	Giulio Gandini	
2025	Zombie Land Saga: Yumeginga Paradise	Kōtarō Tatsumi	
2025	Demon Slayer: Kimetsu no Yaiba – The Movie: Infinity Castle	Dōma	
2025	Scarlet	Gravedigger	

== Video games ==
Year	Series	Role	Ref.
2002	Kingdom Hearts	Riku	
2003	Densha de Go! Professional 2	Conductor	
2003	Medabots Infinity	Koji Karakuchi	
2004	Kingdom Hearts: Chain of Memories	Riku, Riku Replica	
2005	Kingdom Hearts II	Riku	
2005	Summon Night Craft Sword Monogatari: Hajimari no Ishi	Jade	
2005	Kare to Kare no Hazama De: White Labyrinth	Kakeru Kawada, Wataru Kawada	
2006	Eureka Seven Vol. 2: The New Vision	Moondoggie	
2006	Kare to Kare no Hazama De: Saikon Kazoku Hen	Kakeru Kawada, Wataru Kawada	
2006	Kare to Kare no Hazama De: Wedding March	Kakeru Kawada, Wataru Kawada	
2006	Yu-Gi-Oh! GX Tag Force	Abidos the Third	
2007	ASH: Archaic Sealed Heat	Jeekawen	
2007	Bakumatsu Renka: Karyuu Kenshiden	Sakihiko	
2007	Baroque	Advanced Angel	
2007	Case Closed: The Mirapolis Investigation	Kyoichi Kurosaki	
2007	Dear My Sun!! Musuko Ikusei Capriccio	Tatsuyoshi Kagura	
2007	Death Note: Kira Game	Light Yagami	
2007	Dragon Shadow Spell	Kaito Amane, Shuki Amane	
2007	Hakarena Heart: Ta ga Tame ni Kimi wa Aru?	Ruiza Kousaka	
2007	Hakarena Heart: Kimi ga Tame ni Kagayaki o	Ruiza Kousaka	
2007	Kingdom Hearts Re:Chain of Memories	Riku, Riku Replica	
2007	Kingdom Hearts II Final Mix	Riku	
2007	La Corda d'Oro 2	Aoi Kaji	
2007	La Corda d'Oro 2 Encore	Aoi Kaji	
2007	Ouran High School Host Club	Tamaki Suoh	
2007	Star Ocean: First Departure	Roddick Farrence	
2007	Trouble Fortune Company Happy Cure	Amane Kunisaki	
2008	Ayashi no Miya	Sawato Mitsuki	
2008	D.Gray-man: Kami no Shitotachi	Chaoji Han	
2008	Fushigi Yūgi: Suzaku Ibun	Tamahome, Taka Sukunami	
2008	Hana Yori Dango: Koi Seyo Otome!	Rui Hanazawa	
2008	Hoshizora no Comic Garden	Ryou Adachi	
2008	Kingdom Hearts Coded	Riku	
2008	Karaoke Joysound Wii	San	
2008	Lux Pain	Atsuki Saijo	
2008	Mobile Suit Gundam 00	Setsuna F. Seiei	
2008	Mobile Suit Gundam: Gundam vs. Gundam	Setsuna F. Seiei	
2008	Mobile Suit Gundam 00: Gundam Meisters	Setsuna F. Seiei	
2008	Oshare Princess DS: Oshare ni Koi Shite 2	Yuuta	
2008	Real Rode	Wataru	
2008	Sands of Destruction	Kyrie Illunis	
2008	Soul Eater: Monotone Princess	Death the Kid	
2008	Soul Eater: Plot of Medusa	Death the Kid	
2008	Super Robot Wars Z	Moondoggie	
2008	Tales of Vesperia	Flynn Scifo	
2008	True Fortune	Jun Hoshimiya	
2008	Yu-Gi-Oh! GX Tag Force 3	Abidos the Third	
2009	Castlevania Judgment	Alucard	
2009	Daemon Bride	Kuon Sumeragi, Judgement Day	
2009	Fullmetal Alchemist: Brotherhood	Ling Yao	
2009	Fullmetal Alchemist: Prince of the Dawn	Ling Yao	
2009	I Will Protect You	Ren	
2009	Inazuma Eleven 2	Shirō Fubuki	
2009	Kingdom Hearts 358/2 Days	Riku	
2009	La Corda d'Oro 2 f	Aoi Kaji	
2009	La Corda d'Oro 2 f Encore	Aoi Kaji	
2009	Lucian Bee's: Resurrection Supernova	Remi J. Belmont	
2009	Mega Monster Battle NEO Galaxy Legend	Ultraman Zero	
2009	Mobile Suit Gundam: Gundam vs. Gundam Next	Setsuna F. Seiei	
2009	Ouran High School Host Club DS	Tamaki Suoh	
2009	SD Gundam G Generation Wars	Setsuna F. Seiei, Shams Cōza	
2009	Skip Beat!	Shō Fuwa	
2009	Soul Eater: Battle Resonance	Death the Kid	
2009	Steins;Gate	Rintaro Okabe	
2009	Hakushaku to Yōsei: Yume to Kizuna ni Omoi o Hasete	Ulysses	
2009	Vampire Knight DS	Zero Kiryu	
2010	Durarara!! 3-way standoff	Masaomi Kida	
2010	Dynasty Warriors: Gundam 3	Setsuna F. Seiei	
2010	Kingdom Hearts Re:coded	Riku	
2010	Elsword	Raven	
2010	Fullmetal Alchemist: To the Promised Day	Ling Yao	
2010	Gundam Assault Survive	Setsuna F. Seiei	
2010	Inazuma Eleven 3	Shirō Fubuki	
2010	Inazuma Eleven: Bakunetsu Soccer Battle	Shirō Fubuki	
2010	Katekyo Hitman Reborn! DS Fate of Heat III: Yuki no Shugosha Raishuu!	Gelaro	
2010	Kingdom Hearts Birth by Sleep	Riku, young Xehanort	
2010	La Corda d'Oro 3	Sei Amamiya	
2010	Last song to you	Reiji	
2010	Lucian Bee's Evil Violet	Remi J Belmont	
2010	Lucian Bee's: Justice Yellow	Remi J Belmont	
2010	Mobile Suit Gundam: Extreme Vs.	Setsuna F. Seiei	
2010	Monster Hunter Frontier Online Season 10	Male Hunter VOICE TYPE 19	
2010	Rabu Kare: Ren'ai Hensa-chi Joushou-chuu	Ken Shitou	
2010	Scared Rider Xechs	Takuto Kirisawa	
2010	Storm Lover	Souya Tatsuhara	
2010	The Betrayal Knows My Name: A Prayer in the Dusk	Shuusei Usui	
2010	Uta no Prince-sama	Tokiya Ichinose	
2011	2nd Super Robot Wars Z: Hakai-Hen	Setsuna F. Seiei	
2011	Another Century's Episode Portable	Setsuna F. Seiei	
2011	Durarara!! 3way standoff -alley-	Masaomi Kida	
2011	FabStyle	Akira Hori	
2011	Frontier Gate	Kurotoki	
2011	Gundam Memories: Memories Of Battle	Setsuna F. Seiei	
2011	Inazuma Eleven GO	Shirō Fubuki	
2011	Inazuma Eleven Strikers	Shirō Fubuki	
2011	Inazuma Eleven Strikers 2012 Xtreme	Shirō Fubuki, Tōru Kadomichi, Izuno Yuu, Astaroth, Gebo Torangas	
2011	Mobile Suit Gundam: Try Age	Setsuna F. Seiei	
2011	Star Driver - Kagayaki no Takuto - Ginga Bishounen Densetsu	Takuto Tsunashi	
2011	SD Gundam G Generation World	Setsuna F. Seiei, Shams Cōza	
2011	Scared Rider Xechs: Stardust Lovers	Takuto Kirisawa	
2011	Steins;Gate: Darling of Loving Vows	Rintaro Okabe	
2011	Storm Lover Natsu Koi!!	Souya Tatsuhara	
2011	Tales of the World: Radiant Mythology 3	Flynn Scifo	
2011	Terror of the Stratus	Seishiro Kudan	
2011	The Last Story	Zael	
2011	Uta no Prince-sama: MUSIC	Tokiya Ichinose	
2011	Uta no Prince-sama: Repeat	Tokiya Ichinose	
2011	Uta no Prince-sama: Sweet Serenade	Tokiya Ichinose	
2011	Yome Collection	Rintaro Okabe, Shino, Yogi, Nobunaga Oda, Saruhiko Fushimi, Masaomi Kida, Joker	
2012	2nd Super Robot Wars Z: Saisei-Hen	Setsuna F. Seiei	
2012	Inazuma Eleven GO Strikers 2013	Shirō Fubuki, Tōru Kadomichi, Astaroth, Izuno Yuu, Cain Saito, Gebo Torangas	
2012	Kingdom Hearts 3D: Dream Drop Distance	Riku	
2012	Professor Layton vs. Ace Attorney	Jeeken Barnrod	
2012	Project X Zone	Flynn Scifo	
2012	Kaku-San-Sei Million Arthur	Arthur Blade Protector	
2012	Mobile Suit Gundam: Extreme Vs. Full Boost	Setsuna F. Seiei	
2012	Mobile Suit Gundam SEED BATTLE DESTINY	Shams Cōza	
2012	SD Gundam G Generation Overworld	Setsuna F. Seiei, Shams Cōza, My Character	
2012	Starry Sky: After Winter	Shiki Kagurazaka	
2012	Storm Lover Kai!!	Souya Tatsuhara	
2012	Tales of the Heroes: Twin Brave	Flynn Scifo	
2012	Unchained Blades Exiv	Ryuga	
2012	Uta no Prince-sama: Debut	Tokiya Ichinose	
2013	7th Dragon 2020-II	Unit 13	
2013	Dynasty Warriors: Gundam Reborn	Setsuna F. Seiei	
2013	Frontier Gate Boost+	Kurotoki	
2013	Heroes' VS	Ultraman Zero, 00 Raiser, Ultraman Saga	
2013	Hanasaku Manimani	Taketo Akane	
2013	Kingdom Hearts HD 1.5 Remix	Riku	
2013	La Corda d'Oro 3: Full Voice Special	Sei Amamiya	
2013	Macross 30: Voices across the Galaxy	Rod Baltmer	
2013	Steins;Gate: Linear Bounded Phenogram	Rintaro Okabe	
2013	Storm Lover 2nd	Souya Tatsuhara	
2013	Super Robot Wars Operation Extend	Setsuna F. Seiei	
2013	Super Robot Wars UX	Setsuna F. Seiei	
2013	Ultraman All-Star Chronicle	Ultraman Zero	
2013	Uta no Prince-sama: All Star	Tokiya Ichinose	
2013	Uta no Prince-sama: MUSIC 2	Tokiya Ichinose	
2014	Ayakashi Koi Gikyoku	Akito	
2014	Boyfriend (Beta)	Kagami Saku	
2014	K: Wonderful School Days	Saruhiko Fushimi	
2014	Daikanyama Secret Love	Yuu Izumi	
2014	Durarara!! 3way standoff -alley- V	Masaomi Kida	
2014	Kingdom Hearts HD 2.5 Remix	Riku	
2014	La Corda d'Oro 3 AnotherSky feat. Jinnan	Sei Amamiya	
2014	La Corda d'Oro 3 AnotherSky feat. Shiseikan	Sei Amamiya	
2014	La Corda d'Oro 3 AnotherSky feat. Amane Gakuen	Sei Amamiya	
2014	Magi: A New World	Mū Alexius	
2014	Kai-Ri-Sei Million Arthur	Arthur Blade Protector	
2014	Mobile Suit Gundam: Extreme Vs. Maxi Boost	Setsuna F. Seiei	
2014	Monster Hunter Mezeporta Reclamation	Lucius	
2014	Nobunaga the Fool: War's Regalia	Nobunaga Oda	
2014	Rage of Bahamut	Rusty	
2014	Ren'ai Eternal Gakuen	Hisui Tachibana	
2014	Shining Resonance	Agnum Bulletheart	
2014	Super Hero Generation	Ultraman Zero, Darklops Zero, 00 Raiser	
2014	Super Robot Wars Z III Jigoku-hen	Setsuna F. Seiei	
2014	Tales of the World: Reve Unitia	Flynn Scifo	
2014	Wonder Flick	Marulk	
2015	100 Sleeping Princes and the Kingdom of Dreams	Kairi, Sefir	
2015	7th Dragon III Code: VFD	Unit 13	
2015	Cross Ange: Rondo of Angels and Dragons tr.	Tusk	
2015	Dash!! Sushi Ninja	Egg	
2015	Disgaea 5: Alliance of Vengeance	Killia	
2015	Durarara!! Relay	Masaomi Kida	
2015	Fate/Grand Order	Charles-Henri Sanson, Dr. Jekyll and Mr. Hyde, Bedivere	
2015	Fire Emblem Fates	Leo	
2015	Hakuōki: Kyoto Winds	Hachiro Iba	
2015	K: Wonderful School Days V Edition	Saruhiko Fushimi	
2015	Lost Heroes Bonus Edition	Ultraman Zero, 00 Gundam, 00 Raiser	
2015	Lost Heroes 2	Ultraman Zero, 00 Qan[T]	
2015	Luminous Arc Infinity	Aswad	
2015	Prince of Stride	Reiji Suwa	
2015	Project X Zone 2	Flynn Scifo	
2015	Ren'ai Joutou! Ikemen Gakuen	Rei Toudou	
2015	Rune Story	Gilthunder	
2015	Scared Rider Xechs Rev.	Takuto Kirisawa	
2015	Steins;Gate 0	Rintaro Okabe	
2015	Super Robot Wars BX	Setsuna F. Seiei	
2015	Super Robot Wars X-Ω	Setsuna F. Seiei, Takuto Tsunashi	
2015	Super Robot Wars Z III Tengoku-hen	Setsuna F. Seiei	
2015	The Seven Deadly Sins: Knights in the Pocket	Gilthunder	
2015	The Seven Deadly Sins: Unjust Sin	Gilthunder]	
2015	Tokyo Ghoul: Jail	Shuu Tsukiyama	
2015	Uta no Prince-sama: All Star After Secret	Tokiya Ichinose	
2015	Xuccess Heaven	Ryūnosuke Kumogami	
2016	Assassination Classroom: Assassin Training Plan	Gakushū Asano	
2016	Cardfight!! Vanguard G: Stride to Victory!!	Masato Hyuuga, Kouji Ibuki	
2016	Final Fantasy XV	Ignis Scientia	
2016	Hakuōki: Edo Blossoms	Hachiro Iba	
2016	La Corda d'Oro 4	Sei Amamiya	
2016	NightCry	Eric	
2016	Persona 5	Ryuji Sakamoto, Captain Kidd (Persona awakening voice)	
2016	Star Ocean: Anamnesis	Roddick Farrence	
2016	Uta no Prince-sama: MUSIC 3	Tokiya Ichinose	
2016	Ultraman Fusion Fight!	Ultraman Zero	
2016	World of Final Fantasy	Shivalry	
2017	Bungo Stray Dogs: Tales of the Lost	Osamu Dazai	
2017	Captain Tsubasa: Tatakae Dream Team	Juan Diaz	
2017	Dragon Quest Rivals	Kiefer	
2017	Fire Emblem Heroes	Leo	
2017	Fire Emblem Warriors	Leo	
2017	Kingdom Hearts HD 2.8 Final Chapter Prologue	Riku	
2017	La Corda d'Oro 2 ff	Aoi Kaji	
2017	Million Arthur: Arcana Blood	Arthur Blade Protector	
2017	Monster of the Deep: Final Fantasy XV	Ignis Scientia	
2017	Othellonia x Death Note	Light Yagami	
2017	Super Robot Wars V	Setsuna F. Seiei, Tusk	
2017	Uta no Prince-sama: Shining Live	Tokiya Ichinose	
2017	Xenoblade Chronicles 2	Dagas/Kubira	
2018	Final Fantasy XV: Pocket Edition	Ignis Scientia	
2018	Granblue Fantasy - Persona 5: Thievery in Blue	Skull/Ryuji Sakamoto	
2018	Han-Gyaku-Sei Million Arthur	Arthur Blade Protector	
2018	Knights Chronicle x Fullmetal Alchemist	Ling Yao	
2018	Onmyoji	Yamata no Orochi	
2018	Othellonia x Fullmetal Alchemist	Ling Yao	
2018	Persona 5: Dancing in Starlight	Ryuji Sakamoto	
2018	Persona Q2: New Cinema Labyrinth	Ryuji Sakamoto	
2018	Puyo Puyo!! Quest x Persona Q2: New Cinema Labyrinth	Ryuji Sakamoto	
2018	Steins;Gate Elite	Rintaro Okabe	
2018	Super Robot Wars X	Tusk	
2018	Tales of the Rays: Mirrage Prison	Flynn Scifo	
2018	The Seven Deadly Sins: Knights of Britannia	Gilthunder	
2019	Bungo Stray Dogs x 100 Sleeping Princes and the Kingdom of Dreams	Osamu Dazai	
2019	Catherine: Full Body	Ryuji Sakamoto	
2019	Hakuōki Shinkai: Tsukikage no Shō	Hachiro Iba	
2019	Fullmetal Alchemist x Crystal of Re:union	Ling Yao	
2019	Jump Force	Light Yagami	
2019	Kingdom Hearts III	Riku, Riku Replica	
2019	Persona 5: The Royal	Ryuji Sakamoto	
2019	Super Smash Bros. Ultimate	Ryuji Sakamoto	DLC
2019	The Seven Deadly Sins: Grand Cross of Light and Darkness	Gilthunder	
2019	Tales of Vesperia: Definitive Edition	Flynn Scifo	
2019	Tokyo Ghoul:re - Call to Exist	Shuu Tsukiyama	
2020	Show by Rock!! Fes A Live	Shuu Zo	
2020	Persona 5 Strikers	Ryuji Sakamoto	
2020	Kingdom Hearts: Melody of Memory	Riku	
2022	SD Gundam Battle Alliance	Setsuna F. Seiei	
2022	Onmyoji	SP Fallen God Orochi	
2023	Persona 5 Tactica	Ryuji Sakamoto	
2025	Inazuma Eleven: Victory Road	Senjiro Otome	
TBA	Steins;???	TBA	

== Dubbing ==
=== Live-action ===
Title	Role	Dubbing actor	Notes	Ref.
Back to the Future	Marty McFly	Michael J. Fox	2025 NTV edition	
Back to the Future Part II	Marty McFly / Marty McFly Jr. / Marlene McFly	Michael J. Fox	2025 NTV edition	
Back to the Future Part III	Marty McFly / Seamus McFly	Michael J. Fox	2025 NTV edition	
Caitlin's Way	Griffen Lowe	Jeremy Foley	Debut role	
Cats	Mungojerrie	Danny Collins		
Charlie and the Chocolate Factory	Willy Wonka	Johnny Depp	2008 NTV edition	
The Chorus	Mondain	Grégory Gatignol		
E.T. the Extra-Terrestrial	Tyler	C. Thomas Howell	2002 DVD edition	
Fantastic Beasts and Where to Find Them	Newt Scamander	Eddie Redmayne		
Fantastic Beasts: The Crimes of Grindelwald	Newt Scamander	Eddie Redmayne		
Fantastic Beasts: The Secrets of Dumbledore	Newt Scamander	Eddie Redmayne		
Five Star Hotel	Pan Yu Long	Zhang Jun Ning		
Gladiator II	Emperor Geta	Joseph Quinn		
Godzilla x Kong: The New Empire	Trapper	Dan Stevens		
Jumong	Young Jumong; Yuri	Song Il-gook; Ahn Yong-joon		
Hannah Montana: The Movie	Travis Brody	Lucas Till		
Harry Potter and the Philosopher's Stone	Percy Weasley	Chris Rankin		
Harry Potter and the Chamber of Secrets	Percy Weasley	Chris Rankin		
Harry Potter and the Prisoner of Azkaban	Percy Weasley	Chris Rankin		
Helix	The Scythe	Robert Naylor		
King of Ambition	Baek Do-hoon	Jung Yun-ho		
MacGyver	Angus MacGyver	Lucas Till		
Miss Peregrine's Home for Peculiar Children	Jacob "Jake" Portman	Asa Butterfield		
Monster Hunter	Marshall	Diego Boneta		
My Mighty Princess	Joon-mo	Yoo Gun		
Percy Jackson & the Olympians: The Lightning Thief	Percy Jackson	Logan Lerman		
Percy Jackson: Sea of Monsters	Percy Jackson	Logan Lerman		
Phil of the Future	Seth Wosmer	Evan Peters		
Queen Seondeok	Kim Chun-Chu	Yoo Seung-ho		
Return to Halloweentown	Dylan Piper	Joey Zimmerman		
Shazam! Fury of the Gods	Shazam	Zachary Levi		
The Magician	Hwan-hee	Yoo Seung-ho		
The Musketeers	d'Artagnan	Luke Pasqualino		
The Spy Next Door	Larry	Lucas Till		
The Suicide Squad	Abner Krill / Polka-Dot Man	David Dastmalchian		
Top Gun: Maverick	Lt. Bradley "Rooster" Bradshaw	Miles Teller		
Upside Down	Adam Kirk	Jim Sturgess		
West Side Story	Tony	Ansel Elgort		
White Fang	Jack Conroy	Ethan Hawke	NHK edition	
White Fang 2: Myth of the White Wolf	Jack Conroy	Ethan Hawke	NHK edition	
X-Men Origins: Wolverine	Cyclops/Scott Summers	Tim Pocock		

=== Animation ===
Title	Role	Ref.
Bionicle: Mask of Light	Takua Takanuva	
The Boss Baby	Adult Tim, Elvis	
The Boss Baby: Family Business	Tim Templeton	
The Cat in the Hat	The Cat in the Hat	
Despicable Me 2	Antonio Pérez	
Despicable Me 3	Clive	
The Grinch	The Narrator	
Hoppers	Tom Lizard	
The Little Prince	Mr. Prince	
The Lorax	Ted Wiggins	
Minions	Herb, Lou McManus	
Minions: The Rise of Gru	Biker	
My Little Pony: Friendship Is Magic	Shining Armor	
My Little Pony: Equestria Girls – Friendship Games	Shining Armor, Bus Driver	
The Legend of Hei	Wuxian	
The Secret Life of Pets	Tiberius, The Sausages	
The Secret Life of Pets 2	Sergei	
Sing	Eddie Noodleman, Ray	
Smallfoot	Percy	
Smurfs	No Name Smurf	
Spider-Man: Into the Spider-Verse	Peter B. Parker/Spider-Man	
Spider-Man: Across the Spider-Verse	Peter B. Parker/Spider-Man	
The Super Mario Bros. Movie	Mario	
The Super Mario Galaxy Movie	Mario	
Trolls World Tour	Cooper	
War Game	Freddie	

== Drama CD ==
- Dolls (Seiju Shikibu)
- Free! (Rin Matsuoka)
- Karneval (Yogi)
- Mobile Suit Gundam 00 (Setsuna F. Seiei)
- Ouran High School Host Club (Tamaki Suoh)
- Soul Eater (Death the Kid)
- Starry Sky (Shiki Kagurazaka)
- Steins;Gate (Rintaro Okabe)
- Uta no Prince-sama (Tokiya Ichinose)
- Vampire Knight (Zero Kiryu and Ichiru Kiryu)
- Fate/stay night: Garden of Avalon - glorious, after image (Bedivere)
- Fire Emblem Fates (Leo)
- Bungo Stray Dogs (Osamu Dazai)

== Comics ==
- Strobe Edge (Ren Ichinose)

== Live-action ==
Year	Title	Role	Notes	Ref.
1992	Special Rescue Exceedraft	Young Bunzou Yazaki	Eps. 7-8	
1995	Kinpachi-sensei S4	Katsujii Adachi	Television	
1996	Keiji Ou!!	Bad junior high school student	Television	
1998	Kinpachi-sensei special IX	Katsujii Adachi	Television	
1998	News no Onna	Yusuke Yamashita	Television	
2000	Mofuku no Rendezvous		Television	
2000	Tezuka Osamu gekijou		Television	
2004	Quill		Film	
2006	The Prince of Tennis	Renji Yanagi	Film	
2008	The Quiz Show	Tadao Manaka	Television	
2009	2 Steps!	Yuusuke Fujikura	Film	
2009	Hana Guerilla	Tabata	Film	
2009	Shinjuku Kabukicho Hoikuen	Tatsuya	Film	
2009	Mega Monster Battle: Ultra Galaxy	Ultraman Zero (voice)	Film	
2010	Wonderful World	Seishi Katayama	Film	
2010	Ultra Galaxy Legend Side Story: Ultraman Zero vs. Darklops Zero	Ultraman Zero (voice), Darklops Zero (voice)	OVA	
2010	Ultraman Zero: The Revenge of Belial	Ultraman Zero (voice)	Film	
2011	Kami Voice	Kanade Asai	Film	
2011	Ultraman Zero Side Story: Killer the Beatstar	Ultraman Zero (voice)	OVA	
2011	Ultraman Retsuden	Ultraman Zero (voice), Singer (ep. 72 cameo)	Television	
2012	Ultraman Saga	Ultraman Zero (voice), Ultraman Saga (voice)	Film	
2012	Ultra Zero Fight	Ultraman Zero (voice)	Television	
2013	New Ultraman Retsuden	Ultraman Zero (voice)		
2013	Zyuden Sentai Kyoryuger: Gaburincho of Music	Ferocious Knight D/Deathryuger (voice)	Film	
2013	Zyuden Sentai Kyoryuger	Ferocious Knight D	Ep. 39	
2015	Ultraman Ginga S The Movie	Ultraman Zero (voice)	Movie	
2015	Ultraman X	Ultraman Zero (voice)	Ep. 5	
2017	Ajin: Demi-Human	Kei Nagai's IBM (voice)	Film	
2017	Ultraman Zero: The Chronicle	Ultraman Zero (voice)		
2017	Ultraman Orb The Movie	Ultraman Zero (voice)	Movie	
2017	Ultra Fight Orb	Ultraman Zero (voice)		
2017	Ultraman Geed	Ultraman Zero (voice)	Eps. 1, 3 - 25	
2018	Ultraman Geed The Movie	Ultraman Zero (voice)	Movie	
2018	NHK News Ohayō Nippon	Kikikomi Senshi Shuzaider (voice)	NHK Special Episode	
2019	Yuube wa Otanoshimi Deshita ne	Onita	Television	
2019	Ultra Galaxy Fight: New Generation Heroes	Ultraman Zero (voice)	YouTube-exclusive series	
2019	Ultraman Taiga	Ultraman Zero (voice)	Episode 23	
2020	Hanzawa Naoki season 2	Furuya	Television	
2020	Ultraman Z	Ultraman Zero (voice)	Episode 1, 6 & 7	
2020	Ultra Galaxy Fight: The Absolute Conspiracy	Ultraman Zero (voice)	YouTube-exclusive series	
2021	Ultraman Chronicle Z: Heroes' Odyssey	Ultraman Zero (voice)	Television	
2022	DCU: Deep Crime Unit	Hiromasa Noda	Television; ep. 1	
2022	Ishiko and Haneo: You're Suing Me?	Fumihiko Tanzawa	Television	
2022	I Will Be Your Bloom	Kenji Soegi	Television	
2023	Ranman	Itsuma Hayakawa	Television; Asadora	
2023	Ultraman New Generation Stars	Ultraman Zero (voice)	Television; eps. 8 & 9	
2023	Ōoku: The Inner Chambers	Dr. Kuroki Gen'ichirō	Television; ep. 21	
2024	90 Years Old – So What?	Takuya Kurata	Film	
2024	Wing-Man	Kitakura-sensei	Television	
2025	Ya Boy Kongming! The Movie	MC Mamo	Film	
2026	Ultraman Teo	Ultraman Zero (voice)	Episode 11-12	
2027	The Shogunate Rebel	Takigawa Tomotaka	Television; Taiga drama	

== Theater ==
Year	Title	Role	Notes	Ref.
2019	West Side Story: Season 1	Tony	Double-cast with Shouta Aoi	
2021	Waitress	Dr. Pomatter	Japan tour	
2024	JoJo's Bizarre Adventure: Phantom Blood	Dio Brando		

== Radio ==
Year	Program	Notes	Ref.
2006–2011	Paku Romi & Miyano Mamoru's Pokegoe Fight!	co-host with Romi Park	
2008–2009	SMILY☆SPIKY no Kya-cha-ri!	co-host with Shun Takagi	
2008–2014	Oshaberi Yattemasu	co-host with Ryota Yamasato	
2009–present	SMILY☆SPIKY Namako	co-host with Shun Takagi	
2010–2012	Miyano Mamoru's M-One GranPrix		
2012–2013	Miyano Mamoru's RADIO AnimeloMix 〜STARRING!〜		
2014–present	Miyano Mamoru's RADIO SMILE		
