= Ladyspo =

2018 Japanese anime television series

レディスポ (Redisupo)
- Genre: Science fiction comedy
- Anime television series
- Directed by: Hiroshi Kimura
- Original network: Tokyo MX
- Original run: April 10, 2018 – June 26, 2018

Ladyspo (Japanese: レディスポ, Hepburn: Redisupo), short for Lady Sports, is a Japanese science fiction comedy anime television series. The anime premiered on April 10, 2018.

== Characters ==
Arigetti (アリゲッティー, Arigettī)
Voiced by: Saki Shimada
Korupi (コルピ, Korupi)
Voiced by: Akari Uehara
Sabina (サビーナ, Sabīna)
Voiced by: Suzuna Kinoshita
Mokomoko (モコモコ, Mokomoko)
Voiced by: Misato Aoyanagi
Mari (マリー, Marī)
Voiced by: Aina Kusuda

== Production ==
The series is directed by Hiroshi Kimura, and the theme song, "Happy Thinking", is performed by Aina Kusuda. Auditions for the anime started in March 2018 on the Nama TV streaming service.

== Release ==
The series premiered on Tokyo MX on April 10, 2018. (Note: The first episode is listed to premiere on April 9, 2018 at 25:20, which is the same as April 10 at 1:20 AM.)
