= List of K episodes =

K is a 2012 anime series created by the animation studio GoHands and GoRA, a group consisting of seven anonymous authors known as Kōhei Azano, Tatsuki Miyazawa, Yukako Kabei, Yashichiro Takahashi, Hideyuki Furuhashi, Suzu Suzuki, and Rei Rairaku. It is directed by Shingo Suzuki, who also serves as character designer for the series. The series is set when Japan is secretly being ruled by seven Kings of psychic clans called the Seven Clans of Color. Yashiro Isana, a seemingly normal student of Ashinaka High School, is targeted by HOMRA of the Red Clan and Scepter 4 of the Blue Clan, following the murder of pacifist Tatara Totsuka from HOMRA. With the help of a highly skilled swordsman named Kuroh Yatogami and a feline Strain with the ability of sensory interference named Neko, Yashiro rediscovers his true identity as Adolf K. Weismann the First and Silver King.

K aired in Japan on MBS (Animeism block) and later on TBS, CBC, AT-X and BS-TBS from October 5, 2012 to December 28, 2012. Animax Asia also broadcast at the same time. The anime has been licensed by Viz Media in North America and by Madman Entertainment in Australia. The opening theme song is "Kings" by Angela and the ending theme song is "Tsumetai Heya, Hitori" (冷たい部屋、一人; " A Cold Room, Alone") by Mikako Komatsu. Insert songs include "Circle of Friends" by Yūki Kaji and "Itsuka no Zero Kara" (いつかのゼロから; "Someday From Zero") by Angela. The score was composed by Mikio Endō. The second season's opening theme is "Asymmetry" by Yui Horie and the ending theme is "Kai" by customiZ, with the exception of Episode 13, whose ending song is "Kizuna" by Angela.

== Series overview ==
Season	Episodes	Originally released	
Season	Episodes	First released	Last released
1	13	October 5, 2012	December 28, 2012
2	13	October 3, 2015	December 26, 2015
K:MK		July 12, 2014	

== Episode list ==
=== Season 1 (2012) ===
No. overall	No. in season	Title	Directed by	Written by	Original release date	English air date
1	1	"Knight"	Susumu Kudō	Hideyuki Furuhashi	October 5, 2012	July 12, 2013
HOMRA, led by Mikoto Suoh the Third and Red King, attacks a hotel owned by a gang before being confronted by Scepter 4, led by Reisi Munakata the Fourth and Blue King. Meanwhile, at Ashinaka High School, an entire campus built on an island, Yashiro Isana gathers unwanted lunch items from other students and makes his way to one of the school rooftops in order to eat with his pet cat. Classmate Kukuri Yukizome sends Yashiro on an errand to pick up a list of items off campus, but Yashiro gets chased by the members of HOMRA during his travels. Yashiro is saved by Kuroh Yatogami, who later points his sword at Yashiro. A confused Yashiro soon sees a citywide video broadcast of the Colorless King, who resembles him, shooting another man on top of a tower.
2	2	"Kitten"	Yūichi Sugio	Suzu Suzuki	October 12, 2012	July 19, 2013
Kuroh is fooled when being entrusted with a fake farewell letter for Yashiro's ill yet nonexistent little sister. As Yashiro escapes and heads back to Ashinaka disguised in a dog costume, HOMRA sends a notice of a ten million yen bounty on Yashiro, though people in the city first believe it to be a prank. Once Yashiro arrives in his dorm room, his pet cat Neko suddenly transforms into a naked girl, much to his surprise. Kuroh manages to track down Yashiro, with some unexpected help from Kukuri, who is unaware of Yashiro's prior encounter with Kuroh. This soon leads to a wild goose chase throughout the campus, with Neko using her illusion powers to confuse Kuroh. After an exhausting chase, Kuroh decides to cook for Yashiro and Neko, finally giving up the notion of killing Yashiro.
3	3	"Kitchen"	Yūichi Sugio	Tatsuki Miyazawa	October 19, 2012	July 26, 2013
After Mikoto surrenders to Reisi at the hotel, Reisi interrogates Mikoto as to why he has not chosen his successor yet since his power is reaching its limit. Scepter 4 and HOMRA each take action of finding Yashiro at a warehouse and a mall, leading to dead ends. Meanwhile, Kuroh reveals to Yashiro that Japan is secretly being ruled by seven Kings of psychic clans called the Seven Clans of Color. Unlike HOMRA of the Red Clan and Scepter 4 of the Blue Clan, whose clans possess the power of fire and lightning respectively, the Colorless Clan has the power of precognition. Kuroh's master Ichigen Miwa died after foreseeing that Yashiro as his successor might become evil, which Kuroh is tasked to kill Yashiro if there is proof. Yashiro believes that the video broadcast leaked by HOMRA might be faked, therefore he is being falsely accused. Kuroh is convinced to give Yashiro a chance to be proven innocent.
4	4	"Knock-on Effect"	Susumu Kudō	Rei Rairaku	October 26, 2012	August 2, 2013
As the school festival approaches, Yashiro desperately tries to find a possible alibi, which will prove to Kuroh that Yashiro was not responsible for the murder during the night of the shooting. Meanwhile, Scepter 4 and HOMRA are each able to pinpoint Yashiro's whereabouts. Later, Kukuri is able to provide photo evidence that Yashiro was with her during the night of the shooting, where they saw a hole in the roof of the school gymnasium together, clearing Yashiro's name. When Yashiro returns to his dorm room and opens his closet, he is shocked to discover a bloody school uniform that matches the murderer's picture, leading him to rethink the whole situation. As Yashiro contemplates just when Neko finds him, Misaki Yata and Rikio Kamamoto arrive at the entrance of Ashinaka.
5	5	"Knife"	Yūichi Sugio	Kōhei Azano	November 2, 2012	August 9, 2013
Kukuri assigns Yashiro, Kuroh and Neko to buy fireworks off campus for the school festival. Meanwhile, Seri Awashima and Saruhiko Fushimi arrive at Ashinaka, where Seri tries to negotiate with the school principal to release Yashiro's personal information, while Saruhiko illegally accesses the student council's computer to find Yashiro in the student database. Misaki and Rikio go around asking various students if they have seen Yashiro, but to no success due to their scary looks. After soon encountering Misaki and Rikio, Saruhiko repeatedly mocks Misaki, which encourages Misaki to attack Saruhiko out of anger. After awhile, the fight between Misaki and Saruhiko is interrupted by Seri, who sternly tells Misaki and Rikio to leave. Saruhiko informs Seri that the school database has no record of Yashiro being a student at Ashinaka, while Misaki learns from Kukuri that she is not familiar with Yashiro.
6	6	"Karma"	Susumu Kudō	Rei Rairaku	November 9, 2012	August 16, 2013
Seri visits the HOMRA bar for a martini and has a talk with Izumo Kusanagi about Mikoto's current power limit. Meanwhile, Yashiro begins to doubt himself after noticing that he does not appear in any pictures taken at the restaurant where he and his classmates frequent, as well as the fact that Kukuri does not recognize him when he calls her by phone. When Yashiro and Kuroh visit the location of Yashiro's family home, they find a soccer stadium instead as it begins to rain. Believing that he is not real, a depressed Yashiro permits Kuroh to kill him. However, Kuroh refuses due to his late master Ichigen's words telling him not to give up, only until he is absolutely certain that Yashiro is guilty of murder. A flashback of the life of pacifist Tatara Totsuka is shown on how he joined HOMRA eight years ago up until his death by the Colorless King, which affected his friends of HOMRA.
7	7	"Key"	Hiromitsu Kanazawa	Hideyuki Furuhashi	November 16, 2012	August 23, 2013
Scepter 4 finally tracks down Yashiro and Kuroh at the soccer stadium, as Seri prepares to arrest the two. Neko creates an illusion of a busy intersection in order for Yashiro and Kuroh to escape from Seri. However, they are easily thwarted by Reisi, who reveals that Neko has the power to manipulate people's minds including giving them false memories. While Kuroh fights Reisi, Neko escapes with Yashiro. Reisi nearly defeats Kuroh while questioning his motive behind protecting Yashiro. Just then, an illusion of Yashiro created by Neko appears, distracting Scepter 4 long enough for Kuroh to escape from Reisi. As Yashiro, Kuroh and Neko finally head to safety, Yashiro convinces Neko to retrieve his lost memories to find out the truth no matter the consequences. A flashback reveals that Yashiro fell through the roof of the school gymnasium at night while encountering Neko in cat form, moments before first meeting Kukuri.
8	8	"Kindling"	Katsumasa Yokomine	Yashichiro Takahashi	November 23, 2012	August 30, 2013
Yashiro finds out from his recovered memory that he was pushed off an airship called the Himmelreich by an unknown man, prior to falling into the school gymnasium. He contacts Reisi about his findings, while the rest of Scepter 4 tracks his location. Reisi reveals to Yashiro that this man is Adolf K. Weismann the First and Silver King. When Scepter 4 reaches the location, they find out that the phone call was rigged by Yashiro. Meanwhile, Reisi sends his forces towards the Himmelreich to take Adolf into custody, though Reisi is unaware that Yashiro, Kuroh and Neko are secretly on one of the helicopters also heading to the Himmelreich. However, as Yashiro, Kuroh and Neko break formation and approach the airship, Adolf sets off an explosion.
9	9	"Knell"	Susumu Kudō	Hideyuki Furuhashi	November 30, 2012	September 6, 2013
In January 1945 at Dresden, Adolf and his older sister Klaudia Weismann experimented on albino mice with a relic called the Dresden Slate that gives people magical powers. During a bombing raid, Klaudia was killed, but Adolf survived thanks to the power of the Dresden Slate, though distraught over her death. In April 1945 at the outskirts of Berlin, Adolf left Germany and brought the Dresden Slate into his airship Himmelreich. In the present, Reisi visits Daikaku Kokujōji the Second and Gold King, wanting to confirm if the immortal Adolf is really dead. Believing Adolf is faking his death, Reisi orders Scepter 4 to keep on eye on him. Meanwhile, the Colorless King calls Mikoto through a red telephone from Ashinaka, where he mocks him and claims that he killed Tatara. An angered Mikoto breaks out of the Scepter 4 jailhouse and overpowers Scepter 4. Reunited with the rest of HOMRA, Mikoto and gang head to Ashinaka.
10	10	"Kaleidoscope"	Hiromitsu Kanazawa	Rei Rairaku	December 7, 2012	September 13, 2013
HOMRA takes over Ashinaka in search for Yashiro, as they still believe that he is Tatara's killer. Scepter 4 also arrives and are ordered by Reisi to stand by before they attack. As it begins to snow at night, Saruhiko recalls when he first betrayed Misaki and left HOMRA to join Scepter 4. Izumo tells Mikoto that Tatara always thought of him as a worthy king, despite his quick temper. Mikoto goes to see Reisi, who proposes the ultimatum of HOMRA allowing Scepter 4 to hunt down and punish Yashiro, but Mikoto refuses to comply instead. Reisi warns Mikoto that he will lose control of his powers if he kills Yashiro, presumably the Colorless King. However, Mikoto still has his mind made up on his mission to find and kill Yashiro. Meanwhile, Yashiro, Kuroh and Neko manage to sneak into the campus and decide to rescue their friends.
11	11	"Killer"	Katsumasa Yokomine	Kōhei Azano	December 14, 2012	September 20, 2013
Following the confrontation between Mikoto and Reisi, HOMRA and Scepter 4 begin to clash on the campus. During the crossfire, Mikoto eventually finds Yashiro, Neko, Kuroh and Kukuri near the entrance of the school. Mikoto and Kuroh engage in combat, but Reisi intervenes and strikes at Mikoto. Yashiro, Kuroh, Neko and Kukuri use this opportunity to escape to the dorm lobby, but Kukuri suddenly stabs Yashiro with a piece of shattered glass. It is revealed that Kukuri is possessed by the Colorless King set out to target Yashiro. While the possessed Kukuri runs away, Yashiro rediscovers his lost memories and reawakens as Adolf K. Weismann the First and Silver King.
12	12	"Adolf K. Weismann"	Hiromitsu Kanazawa	Kōhei Azano	December 21, 2012	September 27, 2013
Now with his recovered memories as the Silver King, Yashiro reveals that his current body was once possessed by the Colorless King, a white fox spirit who attempted to take over Adolf's original body to gain his power. A flashback reveals that the Colorless King only snatched Adolf's body and not his power in the Himmelreich, wherein Yashiro got amnesia when the Colorless King swapped bodies. In the present, Yashiro cooperates with Seri and Izumo to stop their clansmen from fighting each other, while using his power to help the students of Ashinaka evacuate the campus. Yashiro asks Neko to become his first clansman, and she uses her power to find the Colorless King. After she successfully locates him, she passes out and Yashiro leaves to confront the Colorless King.
13	13	"King"	Susumu Kudō	Yukako Kabei	December 28, 2012	October 4, 2013
Mikoto and Reisi continue their fight, while Yashiro tries to catch Kukuri, who is still possessed by the Colorless King. Kuroh, now the second clansman under Yashiro, helps Yashiro trick the Colorless King to leave Kukuri's body and absorb him into Yashiro's body. Yashiro flies to where Mikoto and Reisi are located, giving Mikoto the chance to kill Yashiro while the Colorless King is still trapped inside his body. Mikoto finally avenges Tatara's death, as his power reaches its limit. Reisi is forced to stab Mikoto to prevent Mikoto's Sword of Damocles from falling on top of him in a suicidal death. Mikoto whispers some words meant for Anna Kushina, who hears them as she cries out for him outside the campus, realizing that he is no longer alive. Scepter 4 praises the arrival of their surviving leader, while HOMRA honors their late leader with a battle cry. Kuroh and Neko escape the school island, believing that Yashiro is still alive.

=== K: Missing Kings ===
Title	Original release date
K: Missing Kings	July 12, 2014
Scepter 4 of the Blue Clan is dispatched to the Mihashira Tower, the residence of Daikaku Kokujōji the Gold King, while Jungle of the Green Clan invades Mihashira Tower and Yukari Mishakuji infiltrates its chamber that contains the Dresden Slate. It has been year since the disappearance of Yashiro Isana the Silver King, as Kuroh Yatogami, Neko and Kukuri Yukizome reunite outside a cafe. Rikio Kamamoto and Anna Kushina, from the now disbanded HOMRA of the Red Clan, are being pursued by the fully disguised Douhan Hirasaka. Kuroh arrives and chases Douhan away, learning that Anna is unable to locate Yashiro, as her powers have now gone unstable. As Kuroh and Neko take Rikio and Anna to the school island, they encounter Yukari, revealed as Kuroh's former senior. Anna ends up kidnapped by Douhan, prompting a badly injured Rikio to warn Misaki Yata about the current predicament at the HOMRA bar. Misaki contacts Saruhiko Fushimi in a desperate attempt to track Anna's coordinates to the Mihashira Tower. Saruhiko reports to Reisi Munakata about surveillance footage of an intruder walking through walls inside the Mihashira Tower. Misaki infiltrates the Mihashira Tower, while Kuroh and Neko soon follow. Kuroh and Misaki reach the chamber, where Anna is caged and the Dresden Slate is underneath her. Misaki struggles against Douhan, until Izumo Kusanagi shows up. Izumo whispers to Anna, who has a dream of reuniting with Tatara Totsuka and Mikoto Suoh one last time. She awaken as the new Red King, giving Misaki the power to defeat Douhan. While Kuroh and Yukari fight in an intense battle, Yukari comments that Kuroh's sword is empty, which has Kuroh recall his oath to Yashiro as a clansman of the Silver Clan. The fight is interrupted by Nagare Hisui the Fifth and Green King through the medium of Kotosaka the parrot. After Yukari leaves, Nagare launches an attack, but Anna collapses from exhaustion after managing to hold it off. However, Reisi is able to dissolve the attack with his aura. The next day, Scepter 4 honors Anna as the new Red King, and Anna thanks Reisi for saving her and her friends. The Mihashira Tower is under the supervision of Scepter 4 following the threat of Jungle. Kuroh, Neko and Kukuri receive a red marble from Anna, which displays an image of Yashiro. This actually shows Yashiro in a temple at the bottom of an airship called the Schattenreich, where Daikaku slowly succumbs to death. Before dying, it is revealed that Daikaku saved Yashiro from the sea and restored his body to its original form. Yashiro vows to move forward until his last breath.

=== Season 2: Return of Kings (2015) ===
No. overall	No. in season	Title	Directed by	Written by	Original release date
14	1	"Knave"	Katsumasa Yokomine	Tatsuki Miyazawa	October 3, 2015
A flashback introduces a startling rivalry between HOMRA and Scepter 4, led by Mikoto Suoh and Reisi Munakata, all over the streets of Shizume Town. In the present, Sukuna Gojou, a J-rank clansman from Jungle of the Green Clan, targets Kuroh Yatogami and Neko with a parrot plushie filled with a bomb. Meanwhile, Scepter 4 realizes that Jungle treats their missions like some sort of game. Sukuna later broadcasts a disturbing message disrespecting the deaths of Mikoto and Tatara Totsuka. This lures both Misaki Yata and Saruhiko Fushimi inside a building before the rest of their respective clans show up. When Jungle arrives to take out HOMRA and Scepter 4 with parrot plushie bombs, the two clans overwhelm Jungle with their power. One lone Jungle deserter makes his way into the alleyway behind the building, but he is cornered by Kuroh and Neko. His mobile phone strips him of all points and powers. After seeing this, Kuroh and Neko deduce that no answers will be gained from strangers. While Kuroh and Neko continue on their journey, Yashiro Isana begins his descent back into the city.
15	2	"Kindness"	Katsumasa Yokomine	Rei Rairaku	October 10, 2015
Kuroh meets with Reisi Munakata at the Scepter 4 workplace, where they discuss that Nagare Hisui the Fifth and Green King maintains control of Jungle of the Green Clan, a social networking site where its members complete missions and acquire points to determine their rank within the clan. Reisi further mentions that the E-rank is the lowest position and the J-rank is the highest position in Jungle. Although Kuroh does not know the location of Yashiro as of yet, Reisi says that Yashiro will need to undertake the safekeeping of the Dresden Slate. Kuroh declines Reisi's offer of residency and protection. Instead, Reisi assigns Saruhiko the task of tailing Kuroh on his way out. Gōki Zenjō, who served as the right-hand man under Jin Habari the former Blue King, is questioned by Seri Awashima about the Kagutsu Crater Incident fourteen years ago, where he killed Genji Kagutsu the previous Red King, losing his left arm in the process. Neko hangs out with Anna Kushina at the HOMRA bar to avoid meeting Reisi and Saruhiko. However, Neko declines HOMRA's offer of residency and protection as well.
16	3	"Kismet"	Katsumasa Yokomine; Hiromitsu Kanazawa	Suzu Suzuki	October 17, 2015
In their Jungle hideout, Nagare, Yukari Mishakuji, Sukuna, Tenkei Iwafune and Kotosaka the parrot have a discussion about their plan following the disturbing message sent by Sukuna as well as Nagare's desire to meet Yashiro. Nagare, revealed to be unable to walk, gives Yukari a mission to eliminate Kuroh but to bring back Neko alive. Sukuna chooses to join Yukari on this mission. While Kuroh and Neko use Yashiro's dorm room as their base of operations, Izumo Kusanagi finds out that Jungle has released bounties on Misaki and Saruhiko. At the school island, Misaki looks for Neko to return a pair of underwear she left behind as a favor for Anna, but runs into Saruhiko on the way. As Yukari also arrives to deal with Kuroh, Sukuna parts ways to attack Misaki and Saruhiko in order to get more points. Just as Yukari prepares to kill Kuroh at the bridge, Yashiro stops Yukari in the nick of time.
17	4	"Knot"	Hiromitsu Kanazawa	Yashichiro Takahashi	October 24, 2015
As Sukuna continues to fight Misaki and Saruhiko, they all are caught by surprise by Yashiro's Sword of Damocles at the bridge from a distance. Through the medium of Kotosaka, Nagare orders Yukari and Sukuna to withdraw from battle. After Kuroh and Neko welcome Yashiro's return, Yashiro calls a meeting with Anna and Reisi in the dorm room, proposing an alliance to deal with Jungle. Yashiro announces the death of Daikaku Kokujōji, who was the safekeeper of the Dresden Slate. Nagare is so interested in Yashiro because he possesses knowledge in the Dresden Slate, considering him a wild card. Anna and Reisi agree on the alliance, although Reisi declines Yashiro's offer of protecting the Dresden Slate together, as Reisi says that he cannot rely on someone who has already ran away once. Yashiro is unable to answer while remembering how he left Daikaku in Germany long ago, but accepts the outcome.
18	5	"Ken"	Katsumasa Yokomine	Yashichiro Takahashi	October 31, 2015
Yashiro visits the home of Daikaku, where he reveals that his sister Klaudia Weismann left her research behind stored away in a wooden box. Timeless Palace of the Gold Clan visits Yashiro, Kuroh and Neko at the home, receiving permission from Yashiro to maintain the existing system without active participation. Reisi declares to the prime minister that the oversight of the Dresden Slate within Mihashira Tower is now under Scepter 4. At the HOMRA bar, Izumo thinks back to when Yashiro asked him to tell Anna to keep watch over Reisi, since Reisi's Sword of Damocles is rapidly declining. Anna comments that she was able to meet HOMRA due to the Dresden Slate, but she does not want anyone else to meet the same fate as Mikoto. Through Kotosaka as a medium, Nagare contacts Yashiro, requesting to enter an exclusive alliance in order to advance the evolution of mankind. Yashiro refuses, saying that things are different from seventy years ago. Nagare plans to take the Dresden Slate by force, which Reisi is trying to unsuccessfully suppress. Yashiro confirms that Nagare was responsible for the Academy Island Incident one year ago.
19	6	"Keeper"	Hiromitsu Kanazawa	Tatsuki Miyazawa	November 7, 2015
Nagare calls a meeting with Yukari, Sukuna and Tenkei for a plan of attack at Mihashira Tower on Christmas Eve to gain control of the Dresden Slate. Meanwhile, the Silver Clan calls a meeting at an auditorium with HOMRA and Scepter 4, as Yashiro plans to lead in a counterattack to protect the Mihashira Tower. Yashiro reveals that he knows everything about Nagare, saying that Nagare had once solely challenged Daikaku to a battle, as the records of that incident were maintained and passed onto Yashiro by Daikaku before his passing. Yashiro receives support from HOMRA and Scepter 4 once he explains the counterattack strategy. On Christmas Eve, as Scepter 4 tries to delay Yukari and Sukuna on the ground floor, Yashiro tells Kuroh that Nagare might have enough power to defeat the three kings and all clansmens singlehandedly, but only sustaining that power for a short time. In the upper floors, HOMRA stalls Yukari, while the Silver Clan stalls Sukuna. Against Tenkei's plea, Nagare tears apart his straitjacket and shoots off to join the battle.
20	7	"Kickdown"	Katsumasa Yokomine	Hideyuki Furuhashi	November 14, 2015
As Nagare begins his charge to the upper floors, Yukari escapes from HOMRA and Scepter 4, then retrieves Sukuna from the Silver Clan. The three allied clans move onto the third phase, putting the Mihashira Tower on total lockdown and depending only on Anna's psychic powers to communicate. The plan is to decelerate and decrease Nagare's power with several barricades, ultimately for him to face Anna. Nagare is confronted by Anna as he heads towards the chamber containing the Dresden Slate. However, Nagare is finally stopped in one strike by Reisi. Nagare declares himself to be similar to Neko, whom he calls Miyabi Ameno, since they have both defined themselves unbound by the human qualities. Reisi asks if Nagare believes that he can still obtain the Dresden Slate in his exhausted state. Nagare replies that he was only paving the path for someone more qualified to do battle. As another Sword of Damocles mysteriously manifests above the building, Tenkei walks through the fog and reaches the chamber, unveiling himself as the Sixth and Gray King.
21	8	"Kaput"	Hiromitsu Kanazawa	Yukako Kabei	November 21, 2015
In the aftermath of the Kagutsu Crater Incident fourteen years ago, Tenkei found a young Nagare under the rubble, whose heart was pierced by a stone. However, a green light emitted from Nagare and a Sword of Damocles manifested above him. In the present, Tenkei claims that he is no longer Seigo Ōtori the Sixth and Gray King, but rather the freeloading surrogate father of Nagare. As Tenkei uses his fog to engage in combat, Reisi provokes Tenkei by speaking of Cathedral of the Gray Clan, saying that Tenkei left into hiding after failing to save his clansmen and 700,000 civilians from the Kagutsu Crater Incident, but Tenkei remains unfazed. Using a gun, Tenkei breaks Reisi's sword, which damages Reisi's Sword of Damocles even more, allowing Tenkei to escape with Nagare and the Dresden Slate. While Yashiro is at a loss for what to do next, Saruhiko and Misaki briefly argue about their recent defeat. Saruhiko then shuns Reisi for being powerless and cowardice for losing against Tenkei. When Saruhiko calls in his resignation, Reisi berates him for being traitorous. Saruhiko angrily leaves Scepter 4 and joins Jungle instead.
22	9	"Kid's Room"	Masayuki Tachibana	Hideyuki Furuhashi	November 28, 2015
Saruhiko releases Douhan Hirasaka, a former U-rank clansman of Jungle, from her prison cell, after hearing that she joined Jungle just to make money. One month later, the news reports about people developing unnatural powers throughout the city, but this is secretly due Jungle's use of the Dresden Slate. In their hideout, Nagare, Yukari, Sukuna, Tenkei and Kotosaka notice that Douhan and Saruhiko are actively gathering points. In the dorm room, Yashiro comes up with a special countermeasure to reclaim the Dresden Slate called the Resonant Hammer Effect. At night, Seri and Izumo attend a masquerade ball held by Jungle. They are soon chased throughout the building after they manage to steal a party guest's mobile phone. However, the mobile phone is destroyed by none other than Saruhiko, who gains enough points to reach J-rank status. After escaping through the floor with the help of Douhan, Saruhiko is invited to the hideout by Yukari. Saruhiko tells Yukari that he joined Jungle due to being curious after reaching the highest rank, though finding disappointment with a sushi party as a reward. As the remainder of their plan has just begun, Nagare is counting on Saruhiko as a member of Jungle.
23	10	"Keystone"	Hiromitsu Kanazawa; Tetsuichi Yamagishi	Rei Rairaku	December 5, 2015
Much to Sukuna's jealousy, Saruhiko becomes an administrator of the game after reaching J-rank status, but Yukari stop them from starting a fight. A shocked Seri learns that Reisi was fired as captain by the prime minister for failing to prevent the thievery of the Dresden Slate, while Scepter 4 is detained until further notice. At the HOMRA bar, Anna tells Izumo and Reisi that Yashiro intends to destroy the Dresden Slate. Reisi tells Anna and Izumo that he still plans to aim for order, even when his Sword of Damocles is in danger. He is reminded how this situation has reversed itself from a year when he tried to stop Mikoto. When Anna says that Reisi is nothing like Mikoto, a flashback reveals a scene of the two fighting in the streets of Shizume Town. Before he departs, Reisi also informs Anna and Izumo that the alliance between the Kings is void since he is no longer the captain. As the new symbol for the Silver Clan, Yashiro gives Kuroh and Neko silver coins, and Kuroh officially names the Silver Clan as the White Rice Party. Yashiro and Anna are each influenced as the Dresden Slate is liberated.
24	11	"Kali-yuga"	Katsumasa Yokomine	Suzu Suzuki	December 12, 2015
As the Dresden Slate liberates power to all mankind, chaos arises when a worldwide unnatural outbreak occurs. Nagare seals off all paths leading to the Yomito Gate as well as guards the Dresden Slate, which allows him inexhaustible power due to being connected to it. He then asks Tenkei to welcome Reisi. As Reisi and Gōki advance towards the Jungle secret base, they are blocked by the Jungle U-rank members. Scepter 4 gathers intel, but Seri resigns from the clan after observing Reisi and Gōki through the video surveillance, since she wants to remain by Reisi's side. She hands over the rights of acting captain to Himori Akiyama, as to which he orders Scepter 4 to intercept Jungle. Saruhiko opens the Yomito Gate for Reisi, causing Nagare to deem him as a traitor and Sukuna to start a duel with him. As Tenkei meets Reisi and Gōki, the Schattenreich crash-lands just behind Tenkei, uninfluenced by his fog. Reisi and Tenkei then start to clash.
25	12	"Knuckle Bump"	Hiromitsu Kanazawa	Yukako Kabei	December 19, 2015
In a flashback, Misaki was informed by Reisi that Saruhiko joined Jungle on Reisi's orders, since Saruhiko was the only one capable of a successful infiltration, despite the possibly grave consequences. In the present, after the Schattenreich crash-lands, HOMRA attacks and covers the Jungle secret base, making a way for the White Rice Party to reach Nagare. In the meantime, with the help of his fellow clansmen, Reisi is able to defeat Tenkei. As this happens, Reisi's Sword of Damocles starts to reach its limit known as Damocles Down, and Seri stands ready to kill Reisi. While Saruhiko and Misaki fight and defeat Sukuna in battle, Misaki tells Saruhiko that his determination to put his life on the line for Reisi as the Blue King does not make him a traitor. After Misaki regroups with the rest of HOMRA, Saruhiko has an unexpected escape route planned by Douhan. On the way to the bottom level of the Jungle secret base, Kuroh is challenged to a duel against Yukari, while Yashiro and Neko leave Kuroh behind.
26	13	"Kings"	Katsumasa Yokomine	Kōhei Azano	December 26, 2015
Once Yashiro and Neko reach the bottom of the Jungle secret base, Nagare informs Yashiro that Neko was also a survivor in the Kagutsu Crater Incident, and she manipulated her own memory to live as a cat. Meanwhile, Anna amasses the power of her clansmen and opens a path to the bottom level, exposing Yashiro, Neko and Nagare to the Swords of Damocles of all four remaining Kings. Kuroh defeats Yukari and proceeds to the bottom level. Using the Resonant Hammer Effect, Yashiro maximizes his own power to the limit, initiating Damocles Down and effectively negating the power of the Dresden Slate. Reisi is saved from death with the disappearance of the Swords of Damocles, while Nagari dies after the destruction of the Dresden Slate. Tenkei tells the White Rice Party to leave the secret base, which is collapsing from explosions, but he stays back with Nagare. As everyone else evacuates, Yashiro tells Kuroh and Neko that he has to leave his teenage body since he was only able to possess it due to the power of the Dresden Slate. In the epilogue, at Ashinaka High School, Neko becomes a student, while Yashiro, having regained his body as Adolf K. Weismann, becomes a teacher.

=== K: Seven Stories ===
No. in season	Title	Original release date
1	"R:B Blaze"	July 7, 2018
2	"Side: Blue"	August 4, 2018
3	"Side: Green"	September 1, 2018
4	"Lost Small World"	October 6, 2018
5	"Memory of Red"	November 3, 2018
6	"Circle Vision"	December 1, 2018
