= List of K characters =

The following is a list of characters for the K anime and manga series.

== Characters ==
=== Silver Clan ===
Yashiro Isana (伊佐那 社, Isana Yashiro)
Yashiro Isana Voiced by: Daisuke Namikawa (Japanese); Sam Riegel (English)
Adolf K. Weismann Voiced by: Tetsuya Kakihara (Japanese); Lucien Dodge (English)
Nicknamed Shiro (シロ) by his classmates; he is The Silver King (白銀の王, Hakugin no Ō) and the leading character of the series. He is supposedly a normal high school student, until he suddenly finds himself being pursued by several factions - HOMRA, Scepter 4 and Kuroh Yatogami - who believe him to be the murderer of Tatara Totsuka, a member of HOMRA. He later realizes that unbeknownst to him, Totsuka had taken a video moments before his death, which clearly showed Yashiro as the culprit - even though he cannot remember performing murder at all. He later convinces Kuroh to believe him, which he does, and tries to unravel the mystery behind that murder, and the strange events that surround it in this psychic war between the Kings. After enduring a life threatening situation, he finally remembers everything and reintroduces himself as Adolf K. Weismann, the first king and a former researcher of Germany who experimented with the Dresden Slate. Despite his silly, carefree persona, Yashiro is actually extremely clever, and manages to trick even the Blue King, Munakata, in his deceit and guile, and even manipulate Scepter 4 to his advantage using a simple phone call. In K: Return of Kings, he came back to defeat Nagare and his clansmen by using Weismann Down to destroy the Dresden Slate. After the Dresden Slate was destroyed, his soul went back to his original body. In the epilogue, he came back as a teacher at Ashinaka High School.

Kuroh Yatogami (夜刀神 狗朗, Yatogami Kuroh)
Voiced by: Daisuke Ono (Japanese); Matthew Mercer (English)
Known as the Black Dog (黒狗, Kuroinu) as a title, Kuro (クロ) by Yashiro or Kurosuke (クロスケ) by Neko, he is a highly skilled swordsman on a mission to hunt down the next "Colorless King" - whom he believes to be Yashiro - on behalf of his late King and master, Ichigen Miwa. Even though he has a cold exterior, he is a good man who allowed Yashiro a chance to prove his innocence, cooked meals for him and helped around in the festival as an apparent transfer student. For the first few episodes, Kuroh was convinced through the video that Yashiro was evil as he killed Totsuka in cold blood, and sought to kill him as per his master's request. However, he agrees to give Yashiro the benefit of doubt, and now closely monitors his actions. He slowly grows attached to both Yashiro and Neko.

Neko (ネコ, Neko) / Miyabi Ameno (雨乃 雅日, Ameno Miyabi)
Voiced by: Mikako Komatsu (Japanese); Stephanie Sheh (English)
Neko is a Strain with heterochromia eyes. She is mischievous, playful and eats a lot like a cat. Though she appears to have the ability to create illusions, shapeshift and becomes invisible at first, it turns out that she has the ability of sensory interference. She has a strong love and affection for Yashiro and will go to great lengths in order to keep him safe. She refers to him as "Neko's Shiro." Later it was also revealed that she also has the ability to manipulate people's memories as well, which is why Yashiro was misled into thinking that he was an ordinary high school student at first. Like Nagare, she was also a survivor of the Kagutsu incident who had gained new powers. Since then, she was forced to manipulate her own memories and live under a new identity as a cat. In the epilogue, she became a student at Ashinaka High School.

=== Red Clan/HOMRA ===
They are a thug-like band (though they are not actually thugs), driven mostly by action and excitement, crying their slogan 'No Blood, no bone, no ash' when they gather. The king is capable of using fire for their attacks.

Mikoto Suoh (周防 尊, Suoh Mikoto)
Voiced by: Kenjiro Tsuda (Japanese); Keith Silverstein (English)
The Red King (赤の王, Aka no Ō) and former leader of Homra; the Third King. After Totsuka's murder, he was briefly held in the custody of Scepter 4, as he hoped that Scepter 4 would be able to keep his powers in check and prevent him from hurting the people he loves by accident. But he escapes after receiving a phone call from Totsuka's murderer, which he was angered into searching for. According to Kuroh, he has 'ties thicker than blood' with the members of his clan. He is much more insecure about his power than he may seem. He has known Totsuka since his high school days, and Izumo for even longer. He died after being stabbed by Munakata, preventing his Damocles Down. He has appeared in many flashbacks.

Anna Kushina (櫛名 アンナ, Kushina Anna)
Voiced by: Yui Horie (Japanese); Colleen O'Shaughnessey (English)
The youngest and only female member of HOMRA, she is also a Strain who dresses in gothic lolita fashion. Anna has the ability of perception using her red crystal marbles, which she forms out of her own blood. She lost her parents in an accident, and met Mikoto through her Aunt who was Mikoto's teacher at the time. She is the mascot character of HOMRA, and is quite emotionally attached to Mikoto. She loved Tatara's singing, and was his No.1 fan. She has a type of color blindness where she can only recognize the color red. She becomes the next Red King after Mikoto's death.

Izumo Kusanagi (草薙 出雲, Kusanagi Izumo)
Voiced by: Takahiro Sakurai (Japanese); Todd Haberkorn (English)
HOMRA's second in command and Mikoto's right-hand man. He is the brain of HOMRA. He speaks in the Kyoto dialect, and is also fluent in English. He is the owner of the local bar HOMRA, and is extremely protective of it. He has known Mikoto for a long time, and is one of the few who addresses him by his first name. He has a close friendship with Seri Awashima of Scepter 4, as they tend to understand each other, being in the closest position to their kings.

Misaki Yata (八田美咲, Yata Misaki)
Voiced by: Jun Fukuyama (Japanese); Benjamin Diskin (English)
HOMRA's vanguard, he is extremely skilled with a skateboard, which he wields as a weapon. His nickname is "Yatagarasu". He is impatient and passionate, and dislikes being called by his feminine-sounding first name, which Fushimi often taunts him with. He calls Fushimi by the nickname 'Saru', meaning "monkey". He is also rather short, and has a difficulty talking to girls. He and Fushimi used to be close friends and joined HOMRA together, but after Fushimi betrayed them and joined Scepter 4, the two of them always get into fights when they meet. HOMRA is very important to Yata, and he admires Mikoto a lot. Later he also does his best to support Anna and reconciles with Fushimi.

Tatara Totsuka (十束 多々良, Totsuka Tatara)
Voiced by: Yūki Kaji (Japanese); Lucien Dodge (English)
One of the first members of HOMRA, along with Mikoto and Izumo. He has a personality that attracts people, and he was the mood-maker of HOMRA. According to Izumo, he was the weakest member. However, he was also one of the few people Mikoto was dependent on. He is sometimes referred to as a 'wild animal trainer', meaning that he was the only one who could make the Red King keep his powers in check. He was a man of many hobbies, including bonsai, guitar, singing, filming, skateboarding and cooking. He was murdered by the Colorless King.

Rikio Kamamoto (鎌本 力夫, Kamamoto Rikio)
Voiced by: Yūichi Nakamura (Japanese); Grant George (English)
A blonde man who wears sunglasses and is the partner of Yata. During the winter he eats excessively and gets overweight, and loses weight in the summer. He has a soft-hearted and caring personality, and is attached to Yata, calling him "Yata-san" despite being older and taller than him, as they used to know each other as children.

Shouhei Akagi (赤城 翔平, Akagi Shouhei)
Voiced by: Saito Kanjin (Japanese); Christopher Corey Smith (English)
A member of HOMRA who joined at the beginning of the prequel manga, K: Memory of Red. He is man with a generally carefree persona, and was childhood friends with Bando, who he calls "San-chan".

Saburouta Bandou (坂東 三郎太, Bandou Saburouta)
Voiced by: Junichi Yanagida
Bando is a man who wears sunglasses, who cares very much about Akagi but refuses to admit it. He is often bullied by Yata, which is played very much for laughs.

You Chitose (千歳 洋, Chitose You)
Voiced by: Kazuki Shimizu
A playboy who often sleeps around with women due to a terrible breakup which left him unable to get serious with anyone anymore. He is close friends with Dewa, much to the latter's chagrin.

Masaomi Dewa (出羽 将臣, Dewa Masaomi)
Voiced by: Akitoshi Kimura (Season 1), Shintarō Asanuma (Season 2) (Japanese); Lucien Dodge (English)
Dewa is a man who wears a derby hat. He is protective of Chitose, but refers to their relationship as one that is "inseparable, yet undesirable".

Eric Surt (エリック・スルト)
Voiced by: Kouji Takahashi (Japanese); Benjamin Diskin (English)
Eric was the "dog" of a group involved with the yakuza, "Hikawa". The group was crushed by HOMRA, and Eric was forced to attempt to murder Totsuka. Afterwards, he joined HOMRA.

Kousuke Fujishima (藤島 幸助, Fujishima Kousuke)
Fujishima was the man who found Eric lying in a dumpster, and decided to bring him back to HOMRA. He feels sympathy for Eric's plight, and holds great care for him.

=== Blue Clan/Scepter 4 ===
This is a group which stays at their headquarters, forming a police like organization. The members wield swords, which are drawn only to enforce the law.

Reisi Munakata (宗像 礼司, Munakata Reishi)
Voiced by: Tomokazu Sugita (Japanese); Patrick Seitz (English)
The Blue King (青の王, Ao no Ō) and Head of the Special Task Force Unit Scepter 4; the Fourth King. He wears glasses, and has a calm, elegant demeanor. He likes puzzles in his spare time. He is shown to be extremely worried about Mikoto's safety despite them being enemies, and was immensely frustrated by how Mikoto does not seem to appear to care about his own life at all. As a King, he is strong and powerful as he easily overwhelmed Kuroh without drawing his saber, but the full extent of his power is yet unknown. He is also shown to have no malice towards other clans, or Strains, even going out of his way to rescue Anna Kushina from an attack by the Green Clan in K: Missing Kings, and taking in a Strain baby in K: Days of Blue. Neko nicknames him the "Boss with the Glasses".
Seri Awashima (淡島 世理, Awashima Seri)
Voiced by: Miyuki Sawashiro (Japanese); Tara Platt (Season 1), Carrie Keranen (Missing Kings, Season 2) (English)
Reisi's second in command and the only female member of Scepter 4. She has the relationship of bartender and customer with Izumo Kusanagi of HOMRA. He also gave her the nickname 'Heartless Woman'. She likes anko (red bean paste) to such a degree that Kusanagi, Munakata and Fushimi were all visibly sickened. She is named the "Boob Woman" by Neko. Yashiro made her a temporary clansman to talk to her privately. Seri is very loyal to Munakata and cares deeply about his safety. She has large breasts that pop her buttons and exposes her body and her panties.

Saruhiko Fushimi (伏見 猿比古, Fushimi Saruhiko)
Voiced by: Mamoru Miyano (Japanese); Johnny Yong Bosch (English)
The third-in-command of Scepter 4. He is arrogant and unsociable, with a bad attitude, despite being extremely capable, much to Seri's chagrin. He has a habit of clicking his tongue. Fushimi was a former member of HOMRA who betrayed them to join Scepter 4 - he claims to have joined Scepter 4 to gain more power, but his reasons lie deeper than that. He was Yata's friend since middle school and they joined HOMRA together. After joining, Yata became more distant from him. Unlike Yata, Fushimi never felt comfortable in HOMRA. He wanted Yata's attention for himself and considered HOMRA a childish group that would never amount to anything. Eventually he decided to destroy his bond with Yata completely by leaving the group and joining Scepter 4 instead. He gained Munakata's approval and rose fast in the ranks in Scepter 4, despite his attitude. After his betrayal, he and Yata always fight when they meet. Neko calls him the "Jerk with the Glasses". He later defected to join Jungle and rises to a J-rank member in less than a month. However this later turns out to be a ploy planned by Munakata. According to the interview of Gora (Spoon 2di), he chose Scepter 4 just because Jungle was boring, rather than loyalty.

Gōki Zenjō (善条 剛毅, Zenjou Gouki)
Voiced by: Kenjiro Tsuda (Japanese); Keith Silverstein (English)
The former right-hand man of the previous Blue King, Jin Habari. He lost his left arm during the Kagutsu incident. He was working in the General Affairs division under Munakata. He temporary replaced Fushimi's position when he defected from Scepter 4.

Himori Akiyama (秋山 氷杜, Akiyama Himori)
Voiced by: Koji Takahashi (Japanese); Steve Staley (English)
Scepter 4 member with A initial.

Yuujirou Benzai (弁財 酉次郎, Benzai Yuujirou)
Voiced by: Kimura Akitoshi (Season 1), Shintarō Asanuma (Season 2) (Japanese); Kirk Thornton (English)
Scepter 4 member with B initial.

Ryuho Camo (加茂 劉芳, Camo Ryuho)
Voiced by: Hirokazu Miura (Season 1), Hiro Shimono (Season 2) (Japanese); Chris Smith (English)
Scepter 4 member with C initial.

Andy Domyoji (道明寺 アンディ, Domyoji Andy)
Voiced by: Shingo Onizuka
Scepter 4 member with D initial.

Tatsuya Enomoto (榎本 竜哉, Enomoto Tatsuya)
Voiced By: Hironori Saitou Scepter 4 member with E initial.

Daiki Fuse (布施 大輝, Fuse Daiki)
Voiced by: Junichi Yanagita (Japanese); Grant George (English)
Scepter 4 member with F initial.

Ren Goto (五島 蓮, Goto Ren)
Voiced by: Kazuki Shimizu (Japanese); Chris Smith (English)
Scepter 4 member with G initial.

Akira Hidaka (日高 暁, Hidaka Akira)
Voiced by: Daisuke Ono (Japanese); Grant George (English)
Scepter 4 member with H initial.

=== Green Clan/Jungle ===
Nagare Hisui (比水 流, Hisui Nagare)
Voiced by: Kazuyuki Okitsu (Japanese); Robbie Daymond (English)
The Green King (緑の王, Midori no Ō) and the leader of Jungle; the Fifth King who uses a wheelchair. During the Kagutsu incident, he was supposed to have died after his heart was impaled by a rock but he awakened his powers as the Green King. He has the ability to channel himself through Kotosaka, a parrot. He has an obsession with the Silver King and treats his clansmen as players of a game. He dies after the Dresden Slate was destroyed by Yashiro due to his heart being supported by their power.

Yukari Mishakuji (御芍神 紫, Mishakuji Yukari)
Voiced by: Masakazu Morita (Japanese); Chris Hackney (English)
Kuroh’s senior, and also Ichigen Miwa’s disciple. He is also a J-ranked member of Jungle. He is intelligent and powerful, easily wiping out all the Gold Clan members. He is also very narcissistic.

Sukuna Gojou (五條 スクナ, Gojou Sukuna)
Voiced by: Rie Kugimiya (Japanese); Amanda C. Miller (English)
He is a high J-ranked member of Jungle who wields a scythe as a weapon. He has a slight obsession with treating the events around him as games.

Tenkei Iwafune (磐舟 天鶏, Iwafune Tenkei) / Seigo Ōtori (鳳 聖悟, Ootori Seigo)
Voiced by: Hōchū Ōtsuka (Japanese); Ray Chase (English)
The surrogate father of Nagare and a member of Jungle. The Sixth King, The Gray King (灰色の王, Haiiro no Ō), he used to command CATHEDRAL, the 2nd strongest clan after the Gold Clan. During the Kagutsu incident, he saved Nagare although he had lost everything including all his clansmen. After that, he had assumed a new identity and life living together with Nagare while working behind the scenes. He is mortally wounded by Munakata during the final battle and dies together with Nagare after the Dresden Slate was destroyed.

Kotosaka (コトサカ)
Voiced by: Hiro Shimono (Japanese); Quinton Flynn (English)
He is a green parrot and Jungle's clansman. He acts as Nagare's medium of communication and fights by generating electricity.

Douhan Hirasaka (平坂 道反, Hirasaka Douhan)
Voiced by: Kaori Nazuka (Japanese); Cherami Leigh (English)
A bespectacled U-ranked clansman who dons a ninja suit who has the ability to pass through inanimate objects. She was involved in kidnapping Anna before being arrested. She later helped Fushimi to rise up to become a J-rank member in Jungle.

=== Ashinaka High School ===
Kukuri Yukizome (雪染 菊理, Yukizome Kukuri)
Voiced by: Satomi Satō (Japanese); Carrie Savage (Season 1), Janice Kawaye (Missing Kings, Season 2) (English)
She is Yashiro's friend and classmate and also a member of the student council committee. Kukuri later loses memory of meeting Yashiro, Kuroh and Neko. Despite this, it seems that Kukuri did recall being friends with "someone," but could not remember Yashiro's identity. After the trio rescues Kukuri, she is manipulated by the Colorless King, and stabs Yashiro in the abdomen. Whilst still being controlled, she flees from the scene. She is still able to maintain control of her personality despite being possessed. The White Fox Spirit is later freed from her body by Yashiro and Kuroh. Kuroh is ordered by Yashiro to take Kukuri to safety. She later wakes up in Kuroh's arms, remembering his identity along with Neko's, though she is unable to remember Yashiro.

Sumika Inaba (因幡 澄香, Inaba Sumika)
Voiced by: Kanami Satō (Japanese); Michelle Ruff (English)
Kukuri's friend.

Souta Mishina (三科 草太, Mishina Sōta)
Voiced by: Kazuki Shimizu (Japanese); Grant George (English)
Classmate of Yashiro and Kukuri. He once confessed to Kukuri at the school's clock tower but was rejected.

Chiho Hyuuga (日向 千穂, Hyūga Chiho)
Voiced by: Maaya Uchida (Japanese); Erin Fitzgerald (English)
The student council president of Ashinaka High School.

Sakura Asama (浅間 桜, Asakura Sakuma)
Voiced by: Nozomi Yamamoto (Japanese); Colleen O'Shaughnessey (English)
A member of the student council.

=== Other clans ===
Daikaku Kokujōji (國常路 大覚, Kokujōji Daikaku)
Voiced by: Shōzō Iizuka (Japanese); Kirk Thornton (English)
The Gold King (黄金の王, Ōgon no Ō) and the Second King. He is the strongest king who has held custody over the Dresden Slate for many years before his eventual death in K: Missing Kings. He was also credited for turning Japan into the world's greatest economic and technological power. It was later revealed that he was a former lieutenant of the Imperial Japanese Army who witnessed Weismann's experiment during World War II.

Ichigen Miwa (三輪 一言, Miwa Ichigen)
Voiced by: Shō Hayami (Japanese); Grant George (English)
He is the master of Kuroh Yatogami, as well as his father. He was formerly the Seventh and Colorless King (無色の王, Mushiki no Ō), before his death. He also formerly possessed the celebrated sword "Kotowari" before Kuroh took to possessing it.

Colorless King (無色の王, Mushiki no Ō)
Voiced by: Tetsuya Kakihara (Japanese); Sam Riegel (English)
The current Colorless King is an evil fox spirit. His powers include entering the bodies of various individuals and completely take them over, being able to control their very mind. However, the body's original soul is forced to intertwine with his, and by switching several different bodies, he loses control of his true self. The Colorless King's power is also said to absorb the powers of other Kings.

=== Other characters from the manga and novels ===
Honami Kushina (櫛名 穂波, Kushina Honami)

A high school teacher who professions in English. She formerly taught Mikoto Suoh and Izumo Kusanagi. She is also Anna's paternal aunt. She appears in K Side:Red and K: Memory of Red.

Maria Yubikiri

A female Strain who works as a well-known assassin. She appears in K: Memory of Red.

Ayumi Nunohashi (布橋 歩, Nunohashi Ayumi)

Rikio Kamamoto's childhood friend. She appears in K: Memory of Red and K: Missing Kings.

Genji Kagutsu (迦具都 玄示, Kagutsu Genji)

The previous Red King and the late predecessor to Mikoto Suoh. He is the cause of the Kagutsu Crater incident.

Takeru Kusuhara (楠原 剛, Kusuhara Takeru)
Voiced by: Shimba Tsuchiya

A member of Scepter 4. He’s appears in the K Side:Blue. He was killed when he stepped in front of a bullet that was meant for Reisi Munakata.

Jin Habari (羽張 迅, Habari Jin)

The previous Blue King and the late predecessor to Reisi Munakata. He was killed by Gōki Zenjō.

Yayoi Yoshino (吉野 弥生, Yoshino Yayoi)

A general Affairs Section clerk who works at Scepter 4. She is a good friend of Seri Awashima. She appears in K: Days of Blue.

Akito Minato (湊 秋人, Minato Akito)

A member of Scepter 4. Twin brother of Hayato Minato.

Hayato Minato (湊 速人, Minato Hayato)

A member of Scepter 4. Twin brother of Akito Minato.

Aya Oogai (大貝 阿耶, Oogai Aya)

A girl who went to the same school as Saruhiko Fushimi and Misaki Yata. Saruhiko's cousin. She admired Saruhiko and wanted to be like him, and she seems to have been jealous of Yata. Later she joined Jungle. She appears in the Lost Small World novel and manga.

Niki Fushimi (伏見 仁希, Fushimi Niki)

Father of Saruhiko Fushimi. Highly intelligent, but he never did anything useful with his life. He was mentally and psychologically abusive over his son. Later he got ill and died. He appears in the Lost Small World novel and manga, and also in Gakuen K.
