= JAST USA =

English-language video game licensor and distributor

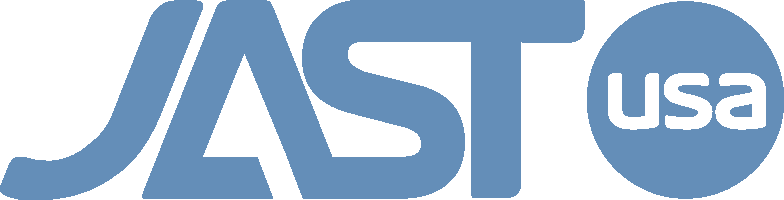
- Genre: Bishōjo games
- Founded: 1996
- Founder: Peter Payne
- Headquarters: San Diego, California, United States
- Brands: Peach Princess, G-Collections, JAST BLUE
- Number of employees: 8–10
- Website: jaststore.com

JAST USA is a platform and publisher of English-language versions of Japanese video games and eroge, specifically bishōjo games, dating sims, visual novels and JRPGs. It was founded in 1996, and their first game releases were Sakura Soft's Season of the Sakura and JAST's Three Sisters' Story.

In addition to publishing their own games, JAST USA also acts as distributor for titles published by MangaGamer. In the past, they have also been the US distributor for games translated by the London-based company Otaku Publishing, Ltd., such as True Love. It has had several brands: Peach Princess, G-Collections, JAST Densetsu, and JAST Blue.

== History ==
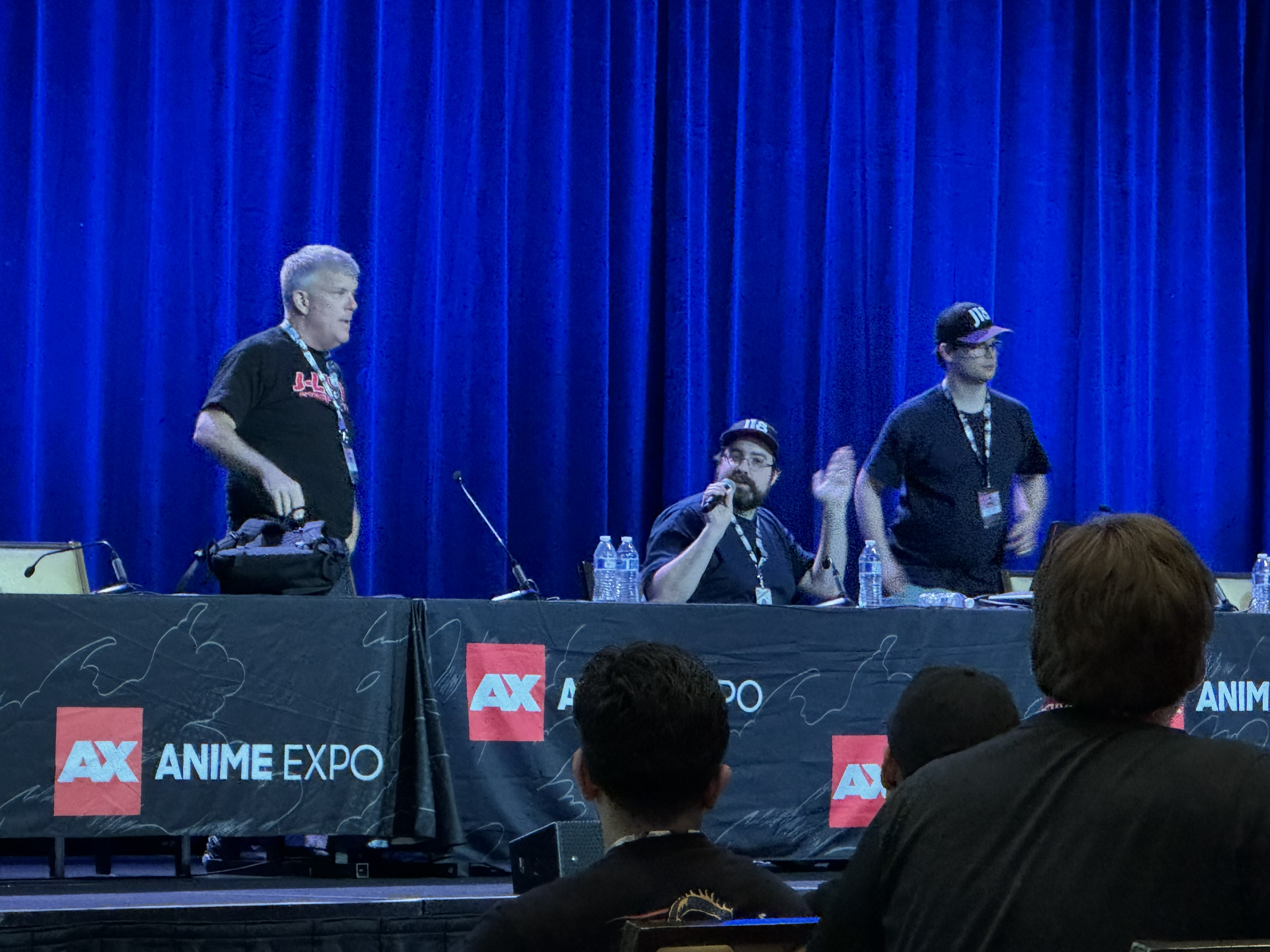
Company founder Peter Payne (left) at JAST USA's Anime Expo panel in 2024

JAST USA was so named because it was originally affiliated with JAST (the Japanese company), but with the closure of JAST in 2000, the company created the subsidiary Peach Princess (because there was no longer a JAST to be affiliated with). As Peach Princess, the company published mostly Crowd and Will titles. In 2005, JAST acquired G-Collections from CD Bros., as it left the US market. In 2006, JAST USA merged its subsidiaries as JAST USA brands. In 2011, the brand JAST Densetsu was created with the goal of separating visual novel games from the image of dating-sims.

In 2015, all brands were folded back into the parent company, JAST USA, to improve overall brand recognition in a market growing more competitive. In 2018 during Anime Expo, its newer branch called JAST BLUE, which focuses on boys' love games, announced license acquirements of Nitro+chiral's titles Sweet Pool, Lamento: Beyond the Void, Togainu no Chi, DRAMAtical Murder, and Slow Damage.

== Games published ==
This list are the titles from JAST USA, including ones from its past subsidiaries and acquisitions.

English title	Japanese title	Release date	Label	Japanese developer
Three Sisters' Story	Sanshimai (三姉妹)	1996	JAST USA	JAST
Season of the Sakura	Sakura no Kisetsu (さくらの季節)	1996	JAST USA	JAST
Nocturnal Illusion	Mugen Yasōkyoku (夢幻夜想曲)	1997	JAST USA	Apricot
Runaway City	Meisō Toshi (迷走都市)	1998	JAST USA	JAST
Hentai Anime Poker		1999-05		
Fairy Nights	Kokushi Musō (刻視夢想)	2000-05	JAST USA	Four-Nine
Legend of Fairies	Shikigami Denshō (式神伝承)	2000-05	JAST USA	Four-Nine
X-Change	X-Change	2001-03-09	Peach Princess	Crowd
Snow Drop	スノードロップ (Snow Drop)	2001-05-07	Peach Princess	Will
Water Closet: The Forbidden Chamber	使用中～W.C.～ (Shiyouchuu ~W.C.~) (I'm using the ~W.C.~)	2001-07	Peach Princess	Guilty (Will)
Tokimeki Check-in!	ときめきCheck in! (Tokimeki Check in!)	2001-10-09	Peach Princess	Crowd
Critical Point	臨界点 ～クリティカル・ポイント～ (Rinkaiten ~Critical Point~)	2002-03	Peach Princess	Sweet Basil
DOR	DOR	2002-07-28	G-Collections	D.O.
Kana Little Sister	加奈～いもうと～ (Kana ~Imouto~)	2002-07-28	G-Collections	D.O.
Chain ~ The Lost Footprints	チェーン 失われた足跡 (Chain: ushinawareta ashiato)	2002-07-28	G-Collections	ZyX
Transfer Student	MonMon Gakuen ~ten-ko-sei~ (もんもん学園～ten・ko・sei～)	2002-07-28	JAST USA	JAST
Private Nurse	プライベートナース (Private Nurse)	2002-11-20	G-Collections	AngelSmile
Target: Pheromone	とってもフェロモン (Tottemo Pheromone)	2002-12-18	G-Collections	Trabulance
Sensei 2	せ・ん・せ・い2 (Sensei 2)	2003-01-07	G-Collections	D.O.
Tsuki: Possession	憑き (Tsuki) (Evil Spirit / Demon)	2003-02-10	G-Collections	ZyX
Do You Like Horny Bunnies?	エッチなバニーさんは嫌い? (Don't you like horny bunnies?)	2003-03-05	G-Collections	ZyX
Come See Me Tonight	私に今夜☆会いに来て (Watashi ni konya ni ai ni kite)	2003-04-15	G-Collections	Sekilala
X-Change 2	X-Change 2	2003-06-03	Peach Princess	Crowd
I'm Gonna Nurse You	看護しちゃうぞ (Kango Shichauzo)	2003-06-24	G-Collections	Trabulance
I'm Gonna Nurse You 2: Is The Sorority House Burning?	看護しちゃうぞ2 ～女子寮は萌えているか～ (Kango Shichauzo 2 ~Joshi Ryou wa Moeteiru ka~)	2003-06-24	G-Collections	Trabulance
Secret Wives' Club	人妻姫倶楽部 (Hitozuma Hime Club) (Adultery Princess Club)	2003-07-30	G-Collections	Sekilala
Crescendo	Crescendo ～永遠だと思っていたあの頃～ (Crescendo ~Eien Dato Omotte Ita Ano Koro~) (Crescendo ~That time we thought would last forever~	2003-10-21	G-Collections	D.O.
Brave Soul	Brave Soul	2003-11-04	Peach Princess	Crowd
I'm Gonna Serve You 4	尽くしてあげちゃう4 ～私たちの蜜月～ (Tsukushite Agechau 4 ~Watashi-tachi no Mitsugetsu~) (I'm gonna serve you 4: Our Honeymoon)	2003-11-25	G-Collections	Trabulance
Virgin Roster	出血簿〜鮮赤の嗚咽〜 (Shukketsubo ~Senaka no Oetsu~) (Bleeding Diary ~Crimson Tears~)	2003-12-19	G-Collections	ZyX
Heart de Roommate	はぁと de ルームメイト (Heart de Roommate)	2004-02-18	G-Collections	AngelSmile
Do You Like Horny Bunnies? 2	エッチなバニーさんは嫌い 2? (Don't you like horny bunnies? 2)	2004-03-23	G-Collections	ZyX
Jewel Knights: Crusaders	ジュエルナイツ・クルセイダーズ (Jewel Knights: Crusaders)	2004-05-12	G-Collections	ZeroCool
Gibo: Stepmother's Sin	義母 (Gibo)	2004-05-28	Peach Princess	Guilty
Slave Pageant	娼女接待 (Shoujo Settai)	2004-06-07	G-Collections	Ignition
Come See Me Tonight 2	私に今夜会いに来て2～お嫁さんは姫巫女～ (Watashi ni Konya Ai ni Kite 2 ~Oyome-san wa Hime Miko~)	2004-08-13	G-Collections	Sekilala
Let's Meow Meow!	みんなでニャンニャン (Minna de Nyan-Nyan)	2004-08-17	G-Collections	Yamitsu Tsuushin
Idols Galore!	召しませアイドル (Meshimase Idol)	2004-09-24	G-Collections	Sekilala
Hitomi: My Stepsister	義妹・仁美 (Stepsister: Hitomi)	2004-11-24	G-Collections	Mercure
Pick Me, Honey!	あなたの幼妻 (Anata no Osanazuma)	2004-12-20	G-Collections	Trabulance
Little My Maid	リトルMyメイド (Little My Maid)	2004-12-24	Peach Princess	Will
The Sagara Family	相楽さん家の悦楽ライフ♪ (Sagara-sanchi no Etsuraku Life ♪) (The Sagara Family's Enjoyable Life)	2004-03-28	G-Collections	ZyX
Figures of Happiness	Shiawase no Katachi (しあわせのかたち)	2005-03-28	G-Collections	Angel Smile
Doushin: Same Heart	同心～三姉妹のエチュード～ (Doushin ~Sanshimai no Etude~z) (lit. Same Heart: 3 Sister's Etude)	2006-05-24	Peach Princess	Crowd
Enzai - Falsely Accused	Enzai (冤罪)	2006-01-31	JAST USA	Langmaor
X Change 3		2006-07-18	Peach Princess	Crowd
Yin-Yang! X-Change Alternative	(いんやん えっくすちぇんじ おるたなてぃぶ)	2006-12-15	Peach Princess	Crowd
Yume Miru Kusuri: A Drug That Makes You Dream	Yume Miru Kusuri (ユメミルクスリ)	2007-04-25	Peach Princess	rúf
Pretty Soldier Wars A.D. 2048.	Yōjū Senki A.D. 2048 (妖獣戦記A．D．2048)	2007-07-20	Peach Princess	D.O.
Bazooka Cafe	Pururun Kafe (ぷるるんカフェ)	2007-10-23	G-Collections	Trabulance
Snow Sakura	Yukizakura (雪桜)	2007-12-13	G-Collections	D.O.
Lightning Warrior Raidy	Ikazuchi no Senshi Raidy ~Haja no Raikō~ (雷の戦士ライディ ～破邪の雷光～)	2008-05-13	G-Collections	ZyX
Princess Waltz		2008-12-02	Peach Princess	Pulltop
Cosplay Fetish Academy	性愛学園ふぇち科 (Seiai Gakuen Fechika)	2009-06-19	G-Collections	Giga
Family Project ~Kazoku Keikaku~	Kazoku Keikaku (家族計画)	2009-07-17	G-Collections	D.O.
Moero Downhill Night	Moero Downhill Night -Tōge Saisoku Densetsu- (萌えろダウンヒルナイト -峠最速伝説-)	2009-11-09	Peach Princess	TOP
Lightning Warrior Raidy II: ~Temple Of Desire~	Ikazuchi no Senshi Raidy II ~Jain no Shinden~ (雷の戦士ライディII ～邪淫の神殿～)	2010-06-29	G-Collections	ZyX
Moero Downhill Night 2	(萌えろDownhill Night 2)	2010-06-29	Peach Princess	TOP
Deus Machina Demonbane	Zanmataisei Demonbein (斬魔大聖デモンベイン)	2011-05-13	JAST USA	Nitroplus
Yukkuri Panic: Escalation	Yūkuri Panikku Esukarēshon (ゆーくりパニック エスカレーション)	2011-06-30	Peach Princess	Rolling Star
My Girlfriend is the President	Osananajimi wa Daitōryō: My Girlfriend is the President. (幼なじみは大統領 My girlfriend is the PRESIDENT.)	2011-12-26	JAST Densetsu	Alcot
School Days HQ	(School Days HQ)	2012-06-28	JAST Densetsu	0verflow
Moero Downhill Night BLAZE		2012-12-03	Peach Princess	TOP
The Song of Saya ~ Saya no Uta	Saya no Uta (沙耶の唄)	2013-05-06	JAST USA	Nitroplus
Yumina the Ethereal	Kikōyoku Senki Tenkū no Yumina (輝光翼戦記 天空のユミナ)	2013-08-09	JAST Densetsu	Eternal
Steins;Gate		2014-03-31	JAST USA	Nitroplus, 5pb.
My Girlfriend is the President Fandisc	Osananajimi wa Daitōryō: My Girlfriend is the President Fandisc. (幼なじみは大統領 My girlfriend is the PRESIDENT Fandisc.)	2014-07-04	JAST Densetsu	Alcot
Girlish Grimoire Littlewitch Romanesque: Editio Perfecta	Shoujo Mahou Gaku Little Witch Romanesque Editio Perfecta (少女魔法学 リトルウィッチロマネスク editio perfecta)	2014-12-22	JAST USA	Littlewitch
Hanachirasu	Hanachirasu (刃鳴散らす)	2015-03-10	JAST USA	Nitroplus
Starless	(STARLESS)	2015-05-12	Peach Princess	Empress
Lightning Warrior Raidy III	Ikazuchi no Senshi Raidy III ~Gyakushuu no Jashinkan~ (雷の戦士ライディIII ～逆襲の邪神官～)	2015-07-20	JAST USA	ZyX
Shiny Days	(SHINY DAYS)	2015-08-25	JAST Densetsu	0verflow
Seinarukana	Seinarukana (聖なるかな)	2016-04-23	JAST Densetsu	Xuse
Sonicomi: Communication With Sonico	Sonikomi (ソニコミ)	2016-07-01	JAST USA	Nitroplus
FLOWERS - Le volume sur Printemps -		2016-08-17	JAST USA	Innocent Grey & Prototype
Majikoi! Love Me, Seriously!	Maji de Watashi ni Koi Shinasai (真剣で私に恋しなさい！！)	2016-12-25	JAST USA	MinatoSoft
Eiyu*Senki - The World Conquest	Eiyuu*Senki (英雄＊戦姫)	2017-10-24	JAST USA	Tenco
Princess X: My Fiancee is a Monster Girl?!	Princess X ~Boku no Iinazuke wa Monsterkko!?~ (プリンセスX ～僕の許嫁はモンスターっ娘!?～)	2017-10-31	JAST USA	Poison@Berry
Trample on Schatten!!	Trample on "Schatten!!" ~Kagefumi no Uta~ (Trample on "Schatten!!" ～かげふみのうた～)	2018-07-16	JAST Densetsu	Tail Wind
FLOWERS - Le volume sur été -		2018-07-16	JAST USA	Innocent Grey & Prototype
sweet pool	スウィート プール	2018-12-19	JAST Blue	Nitro+CHiRAL
Venus Blood -Frontier-	ヴィーナスブラッド－フロンティア－	2019-12-20	JAST USA	dualtail
Togainu no Chi ~Lost Blood~	Togainu no Chi (咎狗の血) (Blood of the Reprimanded Dog)	2020-02-25	JAST Blue	Nitro+CHiRAL
Shoujo Dominance - My Precious Reina -	Shoujo Dominance -Dokusen Yoku no Tsuyo Sugiru Manamusume Reina- (少女ドミナンス -独占欲の強すぎる愛娘 玲奈-)	2020-07-22	JAST USA	monoceros+ Kuro
FLOWERS - Le volume sur Automne -		2020-07-30	JAST USA	Innocent Grey & Prototype
SaDistic BlooD		2020-10-21	JAST USA	Black Cyc
DRAMAtical Murder	ドラマティカル マーダー	2021-04-07	JAST Blue	Nitro+CHiRAL
Closed GAME	クローズド・ゲーム	2021-05-27	JAST USA	Empress & AiCherry
Full Metal Daemon Muramasa	Soukou Akki Muramasa (装甲悪鬼村正)	2021-08-25	JAST USA	Nitroplus
DeadΩAegis	Mahou Shoujo Shoumou Sensen - DeadΩAegis (魔法少女消耗戦線 DeadΩAegis)	2022-01-07	JAST USA	metalogiq
FLOWERS - Le volume sur Hiver -		2022-06-18	JAST USA	Innocent Grey & Prototype
Gore Screaming Show	ゴア・スクリーミング・ショウ	2022-11-11	JAST USA	Black Cyc, N43 Project & Palace
Slow Damage	スロウ・ダメージ	2022-10-14	JAST Blue	Nitro+CHiRAL
Tokyo Necro	凍京NECRO	2023-03-13	JAST USA	Nitroplus
Sorcerer's Choice: Angel or Demon?	Mahoutsukai to Tenshi to Akuma (魔法使いと天使と悪魔)	2023-04-21	JAST Blue	Varenyett
Paradise		2024-04-26	JAST Blue	PIL/SLASH & LOVE&DESTROY
Masquerade: Hell Academy	Masquerade ~Jigoku Gakuen SO/DO/MU~ (マスカレード～地獄学園SO/DO/MU～)	2025-01-30	JAST Blue	PIL/SLASH
Mojika: Truth Rears Its Ugly Head	Minikui Mojika no Ko (みにくいモジカの子)	2025-03-31	JAST USA	Nitroplus
Outlaw Django	Zoku Satsuriku no Django -Jigoku no Shōkinkubi- (続・殺戮のジャンゴ ─地獄の賞金首─)	TBD	JAST USA	Nitroplus
Sumaga	Sumaga (スマガ)	TBD	JAST USA	Nitroplus
