= Lightning Warrior Raidy =

1994 video game

- Cover art of the English version
- Developer: ZyX
- Publishers: JP: ZyX; NA: G-Collections; (Windows 98)
- Series: Lightning Warrior Raidy
- Platforms: MS-DOS, FM Towns, PC-9821, Microsoft Windows 3.1, Microsoft Windows 98
- Release: MS-DOS: September 20, 1994; Windows 98 version: JPN: July 23, 2005 (demo); JPN: August 12, 2005 (full); NA: August 13, 2008
- Genres: Role-playing game, dungeon crawler, bishōjo game, visual novel
- Mode: Single-player

Lightning Warrior Raidy is a dungeon-crawling RPG eroge developed by ZyX, and later translated to English by G-Collections.

== Gameplay ==
The game uses traditional turn-based battles as its gameplay base while telling its narrative though visual novel-styled story and momentary gameplay cutscenes. At various times throughout the game, the player can either instigate or fall victim of various erotic scenes themed after yuri eroticism.

== Plot ==
Raidy, a wandering sword fighter roaming the land of Else, stops at the small village of Sadd to resupply. When she arrived, she notes as though she arrived at a grave town due to only elderly living in the area. The locals tell her all the youth, especially young women have all been abducted from the village and imprisoned by the monsters in the tower nearby. Raidy decided to help the people and investigates the tower to rescue the captives.

== Characters ==
- Raidy (ライディ): The protagonist of the game, a warrior with the mysterious power to control lightning.

== Development and release ==
The game was first released in Japan under the title Ikazuchi no Senshi Raidy (雷の戦士ライディ) on September 20, 1994 for MS-DOS. A version for FM Towns and PC-9821 was released on October 7 of the same year, and a Windows 3.1 edition came out on August 23, 1996.

The game was remade for Windows XP with the title Ikazuchi no Senshi Raidy ~Haja no Raikō~ (雷の戦士ライディ ～破邪の雷光～, Lightning Warrior Raidy ~Lightning that Defeats Evil~) on August 12, 2005. On October 26, 2012, a bundle containing all three games in the series on DVD-ROM for Windows XP, Windows Vista, and Windows 7 was released, entitled Ikazuchi no Senshi Raidy ~Complete Pack~ (雷の戦士ライディ ～コンプリートパック～).

In 2007, G-Collections, an affiliate brand of JAST USA, acquired the rights to release Lightning Warrior Raidy in English along with Snow Sakura. At that time, the release was planned for "mid- to late 2007", but English production didn't finish until May 13, 2008, when G-Collections announced that the game had hit "golden master" status. Even before Lightning Warrior Raidy was available for sale, G-Collections had already revealed their plans to translate the sequel, Lightning Warrior Raidy II.

== Reception ==
In a review for Destructoid, Karen Gellender wrote: "So I'm probably not a good judge of this sort of thing, but my guess is that LWR is neither good hentai, or a particularly good dungeon crawler.... However, I couldn't in good conscience say that the title isn't entertaining. While it's very basic (think Etrian Odyssey without the mapping features), the actual gameplay is solid enough, and the artwork is attractive".

== Adaptations ==
A manga adaptation by Kazuma Sonsei was released in 2014.
