= Romeo Tanaka =

Japanese writer

- Born: June 6, 1973 (age 53); Ishikawa Prefecture, Japan
- Occupations: Author, scenario writer
- Writing career
- Genres: Fantasy, fiction
- Notable works: Cross Channel; Yume Miru Kusuri; Humanity Has Declined

Romeo Tanaka (田中 ロミオ, Tanaka Romio) is a Japanese author and scenario writer for adult and bishōjo games. At one time, he had attended the University of Tsukuba. In 2007, Tanaka started to write his first light novel series entitled Humanity Has Declined which is published by Shogakukan. He is notable for having a hand in the creation of Cross Channel and Yume Miru Kusuri, and co-authored the scenario for Key's game Rewrite.

== Influences ==
Tanaka has stated that some of his major influences include science fiction novelists like Yasutaka Tsutsui, Mariko Ōhara, in addition to screenwriters like Shinji Nojima.

== Works ==
Adult games

- Chanter: Kimi no Uta ga Todoitara (by Terios, co-authorship)
- Cross Channel (by FlyingShine, scenario)
- Shinju no Yakata (by Meteor, scenario)
- Kana: Little Sister (by Digital Object, under pseudonym Yamada Hajime, scenario)
- Kazoku Keikaku (by Digital Object, under pseudonym Yamada Hajime, scenario)
- Otaku Masshigura (by Gindokei, scenario)
- Saihate no Ima, (by Xuse, scenario and planning)
- Setsuei (by Silver Bullet, supervision)
- Hoshi ni Negai o... (by Sky-High feat. Giga, planning)
- Yume Miru Kusuri: A Drug That Makes You Dream (by Rúf, co-authorship and supervision)
- Waka-sama no Zasuru Sekai (by Minato Soft, scenario)

All-age games

- I/O (by Regista, supervision)
- Natsu Yume Yowa (by KID, Kotori scenario)
- Pizzicato Polka: Enishi Kusari Utsutsu Yoru (by KID, scenario)
- Rewrite (by Key, co-authorship and scenario framework)
- Girls Beyond the Wasteland (by Minato Soft, scenario)
- Stella of The End (by Key, scenario)

Light novels

- Humanity Has Declined series
- Aura: Koga Maryuin's Last War (ISBN 978-4-09-451080-5)
- Shakunetsu no Kobayakawa-san (ISBN 978-4-09-451291-5)
