= Maji de Watashi ni Koi Shinasai! =

Japanese visual novel and its adaptation(s)

- Maji de Watashi ni Koi Shinasai!!
- Cover of the video game

真剣で私に恋しなさい!!
- Genre: Comedy, harem, martial arts
- Video game
- Developer: Minato Soft
- Publisher: JP: Minato Soft; NA: JAST USA
- Genre: Eroge, Visual novel
- Platform: Microsoft Windows, PlayStation 3
- Released: JP: August 28, 2009; NA: December 25, 2020
- Anime television series
- Directed by: Keitaro Motonaga
- Written by: Katsuhiko Takayama
- Music by: Ryosuke Nakanishi
- Studio: Lerche
- Licensed by: NA: Sentai Filmworks; UK: MVM Films
- Original network: tvk, AT-X, Tokyo MX
- Original run: October 2, 2011 – December 18, 2011
- Episodes: 12

Maji de Watashi ni Koi Shinasai! (真剣で私に恋しなさい!; lit. 'Love Me Seriously!'), often abbreviated Majikoi! (まじこい!), is a Japanese adult visual novel developed by Minato Soft and released for the PC on August 28, 2009 (first press version) as a DVD and on October 30, 2009 (regular version) as two DVDs. An English translation of the PC version was made by JAST USA and was to be available in 2019, but was delayed to be released on December 25, 2020, first as a digital game, with the physical Collector's Edition released in February 2021.

A sequel entitled Maji de Watashi ni Koishinasai!! S was released in 2012, and a series of five fandiscs called Maji de Watashi ni Koishinasai!! A were released throughout 2013.

A manga adaptation has been publishing in Comp Ace since May 2010 and an anime television series adaptation animated by Lerche aired from October to December 2011. Sentai Filmworks licensed the anime series for North America under the title Majikoi ~ Oh! Samurai Girls for streaming, and for home video release in 2012. MVM films has licensed the series in the UK for release in 2013.

== Plot ==
Kawakami City is famous for its strong dedication to its samurai ancestors. A healthy fighting spirit is always valued and it is even an important factor for success at school. Yamato, the protagonist of the story and a second year student from Kawakami Academy, is always with his close friends (three boys and three girls). They have all known each other since they were young and have done many things together. While they have many other friends, this group of seven is a close-knit, inseparable group. They even have a secret base where they meet. With the new semester, they welcome two girls into their group and shortly after things begin to change.

== Characters ==
=== Kazama family ===
Yamato Naoe (直江 大和, Naoe Yamato)
Voiced by: Hiroshi Kamiya (Japanese); Jessie James Grelle (English)
The main protagonist of both the video game and anime, Yamato is the tactician of the group and loves to outwit others, mostly for fun but occasionally for material gain. He has an extreme love for his hermit crabs, Yadon and Karin. He is aware of all the girls being head over heels in love with him, but does not reciprocate their feelings at all, always avoiding their romantic advances and always rejecting them instantly, up to the point of being scared of them.

Momoyo Kawakami (川神 百代, Kawakami Momoyo)
Voiced by: Kamishiro Misaki (visual novel), Yū Asakawa (drama CD, anime) (Japanese); Carli Mosier (English)
The eldest of the Kawakami Family by a couple of years, Momoyo is seen as the older sister of the group. She effortlessly defeats anyone who challenges her, and is considered by many to be the strongest warrior in the world. She also loves combat more than anything, making her lack of worthy foes frustrating. Fights using her fists.

Kazuko Kawakami (川神 一子, Kawakami Kazuko)
Voiced by: Yukari Aoyama (visual novel), Akane Tomonaga (drama CD, anime) (Japanese); Cynthia Martinez (English)
The adoptive second daughter of the Kawakami family and nicknamed "Wanko" for her dog-like tendencies, Kazuko is known for her cheerful demeanor and dedication to what she cares about. She has been practicing for nearly her entire life to become a trainer at the Kawakami temple, but still pales in comparison to her sister. Fights using a naginata.

Miyako Shiina (椎名 京, Shiina Miyako)
Voiced by: Erena Kaibara (visual novel), Hyo-sei (drama CD, anime) (Japanese); Brittney Karbowski (English)
A longtime classmate of Yamato's, Miyako is withdrawn & aloof, barely speaking to anyone outside the Kazama family. She has been madly in love with Yamato for years, but while Yamato cares deeply about Miyako, he does not reciprocate her feelings at all, and always rebuffs all of her romantic advances and continuously rejects her. Fights using a bow.

Yukie Mayuzumi (黛 由紀江, Mayuzumi Yukie)
Voiced by: Shino Kujo (visual novel), Yūko Gotō (drama CD, anime) (Japanese); Emily Neves (English)
A first-year transfer student, Yukie is shy to the point of conversing with her horse-shaped phone strap, which she has named Matsukaze and given a distinct personality; she often speaks to the Kazama family as Matsukaze. Her goal for the year is to make 100 friends. Fights using a katana.

Christiane Friedrich (クリスティアーネ・フリードリヒ, Kurisutiāne Furīdorihi)
Voiced by: Rina Misaki (visual novel), Shizuka Ito (drama CD, anime) (Japanese); Tiffany Grant (English)
A transfer student from Germany, Chris is devoted to justice & fairness, looking down on Yamato for taking pride in being sneaky. She is not good at reading the room, but will readily jump into conflicts in order to defend her friends. She knows very little about Japan outside of what she has seen in jidaigeki dramas. Fights using a rapier.

Shoichi Kazama (風間 翔一, Kazama Shōichi)
Voiced by: Bakuhatsu Fuji (visual novel), Katsuyuki Konishi (drama CD, anime) (Japanese); Greg Ayres (English)
The leader of the Kazama Family and Yamato's longtime best friend, Shoichi is rarely called anything besides "Captain" by his friends. He loves having new experiences, and makes sure every member of the group is involved in the fun.

Gakuto Shimazu (島津 岳人, Shimazu Gakuto)
Voiced by: Bob Matsunuma (visual novel), Takeshi Kusao (drama CD, anime) (Japanese); Kalob Martinez (English)
The muscle of the group on the men's side, Gakuto is obsessed with finding a girlfriend but has no luck due to most women finding his antics repulsive. His family owns both the group's dorm and their hideout.

Takuya Morooka (師岡 卓也, Morooka Takuya)
Voiced by: Senbei Makari (visual novel), Kenichi Suzumura (drama CD, anime) (Japanese); Blake Shepard (English)
The biggest geek of the group, Takuya is an otaku as he openly loves both anime and manga. He is also skilled with computers and can be counted on to keep up with the rumor mill, but like Gakuto has no luck with women. He is only the member of the Kazama family with no fighting capability.

== Anime ==
An anime television series adaptation was announced on January 18, 2011. The series was animated by Lerche, directed by Keitaro Motonaga, and the scripts are by Katsuhiko Takayama. The anime aired on AT-X from October 1 to December 18, 2011. Sentai Filmworks licensed the series in North America. The series was simulcasted through the Anime Network as well as being streamed on Hulu, then released on home video via Section23 Films in 2012. the anime has one opening theme and ending theme. The opening theme is 'U-n-d-e-r-STANDING' by SV TRIBE, while the ending theme is 'Kimi no Maji o Chōdai', sung by Yuu Asakawa, Akane Tomonaga, Hyo-sei, Shizuka Ito, and Yuuko Gotou.

No.	Title	Original release date
1	"Come at Me, Seriously!!" "Maji de Watashi ni Kakatte Kinasai!!" (真剣で私にかかってきなさい!!)	October 2, 2011
At Kawakami Academy, a dispute is being settled between Class 2-F and Class 2-S during an "academy war". All seems to be going well for Class 2-F until Momoyo Kawakami, one of the "Big Four" in the martial arts world, arrives. Luckily, Yamato Naoe, tactician of Class 2-F, already prepared a countermeasure for her, that being two other members of the "Big Four". In the end, Class 2-F win, as Shoichi Kazama, captain of Class 2-F, managed to beat Hideo Kuki while Momoyo defeated the rest of the "Big Four". After having confessed his love for Momoyo in the past and being turned down once, Yamato confesses his love for her again, but she'd rather see him as her best friend.
2	"Complete the Mission, Seriously!!" "Maji de Ninmu o Kanryō Shinasai!!" (真剣で任務を完了しなさい!!)	October 9, 2011
Maro Ayanokoji, the history teacher of Class 2-F, asks Yamato and friends to search for his dog, who has a striking resemblance of his face. After a long chase across town, they wind up in the middle of a weapon warehouse. They are confronted by mobsters and ninjas. The girls manage to stave off the power of the criminals, but the criminals drop a bomb into the warehouse before making a quick getaway. Yamato and company walk away unharmed from the explosion, thanks to Momoyo, but they all soon remember what they were supposed to do in the first place. Shoichi then shows up out of nowhere and is seen with the dog. Meanwhile, with their destroyed warehouse, the criminals discuss an alternate way to get their weapons into the city.
3	"Go Crazy For Me, Seriously!!" "Maji de Watashi ni Moenasai!!" (真剣で私に萌えなさい!!)	October 16, 2011
Miyako Shiina explains to Cookie how Yamato saved her from being bullied during elementary school. Later on, Cookie is told by Yamato that he saved Miyako because he hated himself for ignoring her pain of being bullied. Yukie Mayuzumi explains to Matsukaze, her small horse-shaped phone strap, how she first met Yamato before the academy entrance ceremony, but she tripped and fell in front of him, giving an embarrassing first impression. She worries how she would feel if Yamato were to marry another girl, especially if she would be good at cooking. After reviewing how Yamato thinks of Momoyo, Yukie strives to become like her and make new friends.
4	"Talk to Me, Seriously!!" "Maji de Watashi to Katarinasai!!" (真剣で私と語りなさい!!)	October 23, 2011
When Yamato walks into the bath, he accidentally sees Christiane Friedrich naked, so she pins him down with her foot to maintain her modesty. He tries to explain that being seen in the nude has become acceptable in Japanese culture throughout history, being the norm between men and women who love one another. Later on, while Kazuko Kawakami jogs with a tire strapped to her back of which Yamato is sitting on, she becomes embarrassed when he takes notice of her small bust size. She first wonders what it would be like for Yamato to marry her sister Momoyo, but then realizes how happy she would be if she were to marry him instead.
5	"Get Mad at Me, Seriously!!" "Maji de Watashi ni Okorinasai!!" (真剣で私に怒りなさい!!)	October 30, 2011
After having been ridiculed from a video clip of her being spanked by Yamato at the end of the "academy war", Kokoro Fushikawa tries to find a way to get her revenge at him, only to be ignored several times. Aggravated, she accidentally knocks over his lunch while he was eating, which was given to him by his friends, prompting him to challenge her to a duel. During the duel, Kokoro repeatedly tosses Yamato down to the ground, but Yamato struggles to stand back on his feet each time until he passes out. Before she officially wins the match, she apologizes to him for ruining his lunch. The next day, it is found out that Yamato deleted the video clip.
6	"Carry It With Me, Seriously!!" "Maji de Watashi to Katsuginasai!!" (真剣で私とかつぎなさい!!)	November 6, 2011
Yamato and friends build a rather "phallic" shrine to be carried during the Kanayama Festival. At the festival, the girls have trouble eating the mushroom-shaped candy, so Momoyo demonstrates how to do it, attracting all the surrounding guys until the candy is bit off. Later on, Class 2-F and Class 2-S engage in an all-out "shrine battle". Meanwhile, Yamato encounters a man with his face covered in bandages, who seems to be acquainted with Yamato's father. But Yamato is angered when the bandaged man says that his father is pathetic for abandoning the country long ago due to believing that the government was corrupted. This encourages Yamato to join the rest of his friends in the battle, but the size of Hideo's shrine is clearly outmatched by the size of Yamato's shrine.
7	"Come With Me, Seriously!!" "Maji de Watshi ni Tsukiainasai!!" (真剣で私につきあいなさい!!)	November 13, 2011
Momoyo tries to talk to Yamato, but she becomes annoyed after seeing him spending time with the other four girls. When Yamato finally gets to see Momoyo, she tries to brush off her jealousy. There have been photographs taken of the girls eating the mushroom-shaped candy during the festival, and they have been distributed worldwide into magazines. Yamato and the girls are tasked to find out who is responsible, but Momoyo chooses to stay behind. Yamato is soon taken hostage by Gyobu Shakadou and the Itagaki Siblings, the group of criminals who were seen in the weapon warehouse from before, as they were the ones responsible for smuggling weapons and magazines overseas. Fortunately, the four girls come to rescue and evade the bomb planted by Gyobu. The two groups begin to fight each other, each faring well against the other. Gyobu attempts to shoot Miyako, but as she dodges it heads toward Yamato, only to be deflected by Momoyo. As Momoyo charges head-on towards Gyobu, she is thwarted by Takae Tachibana, a former member of the "Big Four".
8	"Explain What's Going On, Seriously!!" "Maji de Jijou wo Setsumei Shinasai!!" (真剣で事情を説明しなさい!!)	November 20, 2011
Momoyo and Takae enter into an intense duel, causing massive destruction in the area. In a flashback, Momoyo was told by Ageha Kuki that Takae was falsely reported to be dead. Ageha had developed prosthetic limbs for Takae to be used as a test subject as a "human weapon". During the duel, Yamato has the four other girls strike Takae all at once, but Takae manages to repel them, assisted by her subordinate Saki Mimori, who used her cybernetic left eye and ear to predict their movements. After a while, Momoyo's self-healing powers start to fail, causing her to start acting reckless with her attacks. As Takae launches a set of missiles at Momoyo, a stray missile hurtles towards Yamato, injuring him severely.
9	"Come Out to Me, Seriously!!" "Maji de Watashi ni Kaminguauto shinasai!!" (真剣で私にカミングアウトしなさい!!)	November 27, 2011
Yamato regains consciousness after all the girls declare their love for him, but this harvests rivalry among them. On the roof of the hospital, Ageha tells Momoyo not to pursue Takae anymore because of what happened to Yamato. Gyobu tells the Itagaki Siblings of a large payment given in advance for a smuggling mission, but he burns the piece of paper containing the account name and password to keep the money for himself. The four girls, dressed in nurse uniforms, all come to visit Yamato, but they argue as to who deserves to be with him. Takae and Saki wreak havoc within the city, calling the attention of the four girls. Yamato is soon visited by Tesshin Kawakami, headmaster of the academy, who uses his spiritual energy to heal Yamato. Afterwards, Yamato and Cookie set off to meet up with Momoyo, who has just begun another showdown with Takae.
10	"Go At It With Me, Seriously!!" "Maji de Watashi to Butsukarinasai!!" (真剣で私とぶつかりなさい!!)	December 4, 2011
As the rigorous battle between Momoyo and Takae continues, Yamato and Cookie subdue Saki from assisting Takae from atop a building. However, Takae messes up Cookie's programming system via kiss, causing Cookie to fall off the ledge and shatter onto the ground. As Saki then wields a bayonet at Yamato, the four girls intervene in the nick of time, but none of them are able to land a single hit. Saki knocks Yamato out after he tries to electrocute her, ordering the girls to drop their weapons when she puts a blade over his head. After Momoyo and Takae join the rest of the group to fight there, Ageha drops from a helicopter and tries to kill Takae, but Momoyo allows herself to get shot by Takae when the former was restraining Saki. Takae takes Saki and flies away from the scene, and Momoyo uses her self-healing powers to retract the bullets from her body. In the aftermath of the battle, Momoyo is confronted for her rejection of Yamato's confession.
11	"Sortie with Me, Seriously!!" "Maji de Watashi to Shutsugeki shinasai!!" (真剣で私と出撃しなさい!!)	December 11, 2011
Yamato, recovering from his recent wounds, is met again by the bandaged man, still wondering whether or not the country is worth protecting. The bandaged man believes that gratification in oneself for saving someone else from harm is called justice. Meanwhile, Kazuko, Miyako, Yukie and Christiane all challenge Momoyo to a fight over the right to love Yamato. A public broadcast is shown of Takae threatening to destroy the city and kill the prime minister. The Japan Self-Defense Forces are deployed to guard the prime minister's manor, but they are faced against an angry mob. All five girls each voice why they love Yamato and how he has made an impact in their lives. Yamato, tired of standing around, abruptly stops the fight and suddenly tells the girls that he wants to protect the country for the ones he loves most.
12	"Love Me, Seriously!!" "Maji de Watashi ni Koi shinasai!!" (真剣で私に恋しなさい!!)	December 18, 2011
Yamato and his class face off against Gyobu and the Itagaki Siblings in front of the prime minister's residence, while Momoyo settle things with Takae. Yamato finally understand that his father abandoned the country because the citizens have not shown any love towards the country. When the bandaged man goes to see the prime minister, the latter says that a certain group of smugglers suffered casualties when they were face by the JSDF in the past, which is how he got to win the previous election. The bandage man reveals that he publicly recorded what the prime minister has been saying, which makes the latter very furious. Ageha sees Takae as an empty threat, seeing as there was no intent of destruction or massacre. Soon, Hideo and Kokoro and their classes join with Yamato in the battle. As a newly repaired and updated Cookie has return, Yamato operates it to stop Saki. Momoyo smashes Takae down into a church, defeating her once and for all. As it seems that Momoyo is dying, Yamato kisses her, spontaneously reviving her. The girls push Yamato into a tough spot of choosing whom to love. As a result, he instead confesses his love for hermit crabs for now, much to the surprise of the girls who tell him to take this seriously. Having had enough, Yamato rejects all the girls, confessing he has no romantic feelings for any of them at all. As the girls are heartbroken, Yamato leaves with a victorious smile on his face.

== Reception ==
Maji de Watashi ni Koi Shinasai! topped the Getchu Annual Sales Ranking for PC games in 2009, and was ranked highly by user votes, coming in 2nd place overall, 9th in System, 10th in Music, and 6th in Movie (referring to the opening and ending animations) among games from that year.

Thomas Knight of NookGaming highly recommended JAST USA's English release, praising the writing, characters, and comedy.

The sequel, Maji de Watashi ni Koishinasai! S, was awarded the Silver Grand Prize in the 2012 Moe Game Awards.

== See also ==
- Kimi ga Aruji de Shitsuji ga Ore de
