= Lightning Warrior Raidy II: Temple of Desire =

1996 video game

- English cover art
- Developer: ZyX
- Publishers: JP: ZyX; NA: JAST USA (formerly G-Collections); (Windows 98)
- Series: Lightning Warrior Raidy
- Platform: Microsoft Windows
- Release: Windows 95: JP: March 22, 1996; Windows 98: JP: February 9, 2007 (demo, download version); JP: March 2, 2007 (demo, CD version); JP: June 15, 2007 (retail); NA: June 30, 2010
- Genres: Role-playing game, dungeon crawler, visual novel
- Mode: Single-player

Lightning Warrior Raidy II: Temple of Desire is a dungeon crawling role-playing eroge developed by ZyX, and later translated to English by G-Collections, currently known as JastUSA.

It is both a sequel to Lightning Warrior Raidy and a remake of the second game.

== Gameplay ==
Lightning Warrior Raidy II combines traditional turn-based battle with elements of visual novels. Unlike its predecessor, it uses limited animation for some scenes instead of simple static images. Maps, which had to be located in the first game, are now automatically created as Raidy progresses through a dungeon. There are new equipment types, items, skills such as Extasy Slash, weapons including the ultimate Sexcalibur, and gameplay elements such as commerce, dual-wielding weapons, and a new charge-based Thunder Slash special attack called Thunder Blast.

All fights in the game are one-on-one. Whenever the protagonist Raidy defeats a boss, she punishes them through various kinds of sexual violation and the bosses too erotically rape her in case if they win. Defeating a regular female enemy also shows her undressed and humiliated.

== Plot ==
The game takes place one year after the events of Lightning Warrior Raidy in the oasis town of Lake Blue (レイク・ブルー), which "Lightning Warrior" Raidy wanders into and finds terrorized by a band of female bandits led by Jammy.

== Characters ==
- Raidy (ライディ): The protagonist of the game. She is a warrior with a mysterious power to control lightning.
- Gav: The main antagonist of the story who seems to be stealing the life force of young girls for an unknown but clearly sinister purpose.
- Setia (セティア): The beautiful proprietress of the Lake Blue Inn, Setia is a sociable girl who takes an immediate liking to Raidy after she is saved from the clutches of Jammy's bandit gang. She has strong lesbian tendencies.
- Clay (クレイ): Lake Blue's cheerful town blacksmith. She has a fetish for weapons, and sometimes uses them as masturbation aids.

== Development and release ==
Cover art for the Windows 95/FM-Towns/PC-9821 version of Ikazuchi no Senshi Raidy 2 using the "old-school" art style

The game was first released in Japan under the title Ikazuchi no Senshi Raidy 2 (雷の戦士ライディ2) on December 22, 1995 for MS-DOS. A version for Windows 95, FM Towns and PC-9821 was released on March 22, 1996.

Ikazuchi no Senshi Raidy I & II Collection Pack (雷の戦士ライディI&II コレクションパック), a bundle containing remade editions of both Ikazuchi no Senshi Raidy and Ikazuchi no Senshi Raidy II was released for Windows XP on March 30, 2007. On June 15 of that year, the second game alone was sold as Ikazuchi no Senshi Raidy II ~Jain no Shinden~ (雷の戦士ライディII ～邪淫の神殿～). On October 26, 2012, a bundle containing all three games in the series on DVD-ROM for Windows XP, Windows Vista, and Windows 7 was released, entitled Ikazuchi no Senshi Raidy ~Complete Pack~ (雷の戦士ライディ ～コンプリートパック～).

The beta testing and postproduction phase of the English translation started on March 11, 2010. Pre-orders were opened on the same day. The English version began shipping to customers on June 29. The game features original music composed by HT-Sound, including one vocal track, "Blade of Thunder", performed by Sakuya Kurosaki.

== Reception ==
Virtual Sex Games called Lightning Warrior Raidy II Temple of Desire not the best RPG around, but a great looking hentai RPG.

== Legacy ==
A third game simply titled Lightning Warrior Raidy III was released afterwards. Unlike previous releases, Raidy III is a completely original sequel continuing from the remakes and features an armor fusion system that allows Raidy to combine her soul with the first game's bosses, giving her a completely new look or changing her race entirely and thus giving her new abilities, all while trying to pay off a humongous tab she didn't amass by her own means. Raidy III was again localized by JastUSA and has also received a spin-off titled Raidy 3.5 ~Forres Kiki Ippatsu~ that has yet to be brought westward.

== Adaptations ==
Raidy Comic Anthology was available by mail order.
