= Cross Channel (video game) =

2003 video game

- Developer: Flying Shine
- Publishers: JP: Flying Shine (Win); JP: KID (PS2); JP: Cyberfront (PSP, Xbox 360); JP: 5pb. (PS3, PSV); WW: MoeNovel (Win); JP: Regista (NSW)
- Artist: Matsuryū
- Writer: Romeo Tanaka
- Platforms: Microsoft Windows, PlayStation 2, PlayStation Portable, Xbox 360, PlayStation 3, PlayStation Vita, Nintendo Switch
- Release: Microsoft Windows: JP: September 26, 2003; WW: March 27, 2018; PlayStation 2: JP: March 18, 2004; PlayStation Portable: JP: February 25, 2010; Xbox 360: JP: April 14, 2011; PS3, PS Vita: JP: June 26, 2014; Nintendo Switch: JP: August 20, 2020
- Genre: Visual novel
- Mode: Single-player

Cross Channel, (Note: Cross Channel (Japanese: クロスチャンネル, Hepburn: Kurosu Channeru)) stylized as CROSS†CHANNEL, is a visual novel video game developed by Flying Shine. It was originally released in 2003 for Microsoft Windows, and has later been released for consoles with various added content. An English localization was released in 2018 for Microsoft Windows.

== Synopsis ==
=== Plot ===
Gunjo Gakuen ("Deep Blue School") is a facility designed to gather and isolate those students with a high adaptation coefficient (indicating that the student is less likely to be able to adapt to society), determined from an adaptation exam mandated by the government.

After a failed summer vacation with other members of the school's broadcasting club, Taichi Kurosu and some of the other club members return to the city, only to find that all living creatures within it except for the club members have completely vanished. In order to confirm the status of the outside world, Taichi decides to gather other club members to help Misato Miyasumi, the president of the broadcasting club, set up a broadcasting antenna to contact any possible survivors. However, Taichi soon discovers that the world is actually repeating the same week and thus all their actions are reset, with no loss or gain, no matter what actions are taken. Seeking himself and the restoration of broken bonds, Taichi must discover meaning to exist in this strange and lonely but, for Taichi, comforting world.

=== Main characters ===
- Taichi Kurosu: the protagonist. He calls himself "The Love Aristocrat". He was trying to act as a human, while hiding his score of 84% on the exam, which is almost beyond human boundaries.
- Miki Yamanobe: a cheerful girl. Taichi jokes about her being his pupil in perversion. Is sometimes cruel but is funloving. Her adaption coefficient is 40%, which Taichi remarks as being "right on the cut-off line."
- Kiri Sakura: a squeamish, untrusting girl who hates and fears Taichi. She is a good friend of Miki, albeit a rather clingy friend. Kiri and Miki are nicknamed "the flowers" by Taichi, because they seem to be "two flowers from the same pot."
- Misato Miyasumi: a girl with glasses. She is the president of the broadcasting club. Her exam score is never revealed, but Taichi does note her engaging in severe self-destructive behavior from time to time, which would put her at least above 30. She refers to Taichi as "Peke-kun". She has a problem with Tomoki, the brother she has been separated from since the divorce of their parents.
- Touko Kirihara: a girl descended from a samurai clan. She used to go out with Taichi, but currently is very harsh to him. "Kirihara" is an anagram of Harakiri, which Taichi sometimes uses as her nickname. She scored 46% on the exam, and as Taichi says at one point, is "desperately trying to hold on to the last 54% of her humanity as best she can."
- Youko Hasekura: a kunoichi (female ninja). She's always monitoring Taichi. She is very devoted to Taichi, sometimes to the point of stalking him, but he for the most part ignores her. She used to be Taichi's first love, and is admired by Taichi for being an almost complete person in his mind.
- Nanaka: a mysterious girl who wears a school uniform different from that of Gunjo Gakuen. She always suddenly appears or disappears in front of Taichi without warning, usually by violently crashing into him on her bike.

== Release ==
The game was originally released for Microsoft Windows on September 26, 2003, and was ported to the PlayStation 2 with the subtitle To All People on March 18, 2004. A PlayStation Portable port of To All People version was released on February 25, 2010, and an Xbox 360 port with added content, with the subtitle In Memory of All People, was released on April 14, 2011. Another version, For All People was released on PlayStation 3 and PlayStation Vita on June 26, 2014, and Cross Channel: Final Complete was released for Microsoft Windows on September 26, 2014. A Microsoft Windows version of For All People was released in English on March 27, 2018 by MoeNovel. A Switch version, published by Regista, was released in Japan on August 20, 2020.

== Reception ==
Famitsu gave the PlayStation 3 version of the game a review score of 30/40, whilst the PS Vita version was given a score of 28/40.

== Related media ==
Nanaca Crash!! (ナナカクラッシュ, Nanaka Kurasshu; stylized as NANACA†CRASH!!) is an online spin off game featuring characters from Cross Channel. The objective of the game is to click, hold and release the mouse button to determine the angle and velocity of Nanaka crashing her bicycle into Taichi, sending him flying across the screen. The score is determined by the distance of his flight. Certain characters he crashes into will greatly affect his velocity. On May 16, 2014, Nanaca Crash!! was relaunched as a part of Cross Channel with updated graphics and sound. The Flash version was updated and the game was made available on Android and iOS for the first time.
