= Three Sisters' Story =

1996 video game

- JAST USA cover art
- Developer: JAST
- Publisher: JAST USA
- Platforms: MS-DOS, Windows
- Release: JP: February 1996; NA: November 27, 1996
- Mode: Single-player

Three Sisters' Story (Note: Japanese: 三姉妹, Hepburn: Sanshimai) is a bishōjo game. The game was developed by JAST, a company from Japan that specialized in eroge. The games plot involves a man named Koichi and his brother Eiichi, who the latter is seeking revenge against a man responsible for their father's death, which in turn led to the brothers living around one family member to another. Years later, Koichi seeks revenge against Shoji Okamura and his three daughters. Complications come into play when Eiichi has fallen in love with one of the three daughters.

Following its release to home computers in Japan in 1996, the game was released by JAST USA to Western audiences. JAST USA has formed the same year initially partnering to distribute their games to Western audiences. Three Sisters' Story became their first release.

The game was one of the few games that banned in New Zealand by the Classification Office of New Zealand. The office was concerned with Three Sisters' Story as a game which legitimized sexual violation in a way that was intended to arouse the player.

== Gameplay ==
Like all of the early games released by JAST USA, the game involves the player using an interactive menu to choose options and interact with scenes such as "Think Yuki" to have the main character think about Yuki or "Ask Emi" to ask Emi a question. They can also navigate areas with similar commands such as "Go Park" to move the game forward.

The choices in the game, even done in the beginning of the game have the potential to effect the narrative as the game progresses.

== Plot ==
Koichi and Eiichi are two brothers, who were separated after the suicide of their father and the collapse of his business. Ten years later, Eiichi tracks Koichi down, and tells him that all their misfortune was because of a man named Okamura. Eiichi is now rich and has control over an important company, and financially supports his brother, who lives near Okamura's daughters. Eiichi has driven Okamura to bankruptcy and away from his three daughters, Yuki, Emi and Risa. Koichi starts investigating Okamura's three daughters, but he falls in love with one of the sisters, Emi, and starts a relationship with her.

Over the course of a few days, Koichi discovers the secret ambition of his brother, totally swallowed up by his desire for money: Eiichi is forcing women into prostitution. Eiichi, who wants vengeance at all cost against the Okamuras, starts to persecute them: he offers work to Yuki, the eldest, in a lingerie bar; she agrees, because of the financial problem of the Okamuras. Eiichi also gives lingerie to Risa, the youngest, and he kidnaps Emi. This prompts Koichi to turn against his brother and infiltrate his office to rescue her. After rescuing her, there will be several possible endings, depending on whether the player chose to have sex with Risa, Yuki, his schoolmates, or some combination of the above. If he didn't, then Koichi survives after the building catches fire. Eiichi burns to death inside the building, trying to keep the money with him. Emi confesses her love for Koichi, and the three sisters' father returns home.

== Development and release ==
Three Sister' Story was developed by JAST. JAST had formed in 1985 and developed and published one of the early proto-types to dating sim games with Tenshitachi no Gogo (1985). JAST would continue to make eroge (Japanese erotic games) until their bankruptcy in 2001. Three Sisters' Story was released in Japan in February 1996.

The web shop J-List which partnered with JAST to distribute Japanese games as JAST USA in 1996. The company briefly sold titles such as Three Sisters' Story and Season of the Sakura (1996) as a company named Sakura Soft. JAST USA's founder Peter Payne later said "We often take our cues from Japanese companies, and one thing a lot of them do is create brands for publishing of different games." The game was released in the United States on November 27, 1996. It was released for Windows 95 and MS-DOS and based computers and was JAST USA's first release.

== Reception ==
The magazine Animeco praised the story, graphics, music and small filesize, with some reservations about occasional wordiness and instances when there is only one shown choice.

Will Porter of PC Zone discussed Three Sisters' Story in his article about controversial games, saying that while various Japanese games featuring hentai scenes could be mentioned, he highlighted the game due to the player being required to torture and rape their female nemesis with a baton in order to be given relevant information in the game. By 2019, the game was one of the ten games banned by the Classification Office of New Zealand. It was among the six games banned due to graphic sexual content. Along with RapeLay (2006), the office was concerned with Three Sisters' Story as a game which legitimized sexual violation in a way that was intended to arouse the player.

== See also ==
- List of eroge
- Video games in Japan
