= Last Round Arthurs =

Japanese light novel series

- Cover of the first light novel volume, featuring (from left to right) Rintarou Magami and Luna Artur

ラストラウンド・アーサーズ (Rasutoraundo Āsāzu)
- Genre: Adventure, Fantasy
- Light novel
- Written by: Taro Hitsuji
- Illustrated by: Kiyotaka Haimura
- Published by: Fujimi Shobo
- English publisher: NA: Yen Press
- Imprint: Fujimi Fantasia Bunko
- Original run: July 20, 2018 – January 18, 2020
- Volumes: 5
- Manga
- Written by: Taro Hitsuji
- Illustrated by: Yuzuriha
- Published by: Kadokawa Shoten
- English publisher: NA: Yen Press
- Magazine: Young Ace
- Original run: January 4, 2019 – May 2, 2020
- Volumes: 2

Last Round Arthurs (Japanese: ラストラウンド・アーサーズ, Hepburn: Rasutoraundo Āsāzu) is a Japanese light novel series written by Taro Hitsuji and illustrated by Kiyotaka Haimura. It was published in five volumes between July 2018 and January 2020. A manga adaptation, illustrated by Yuzuriha, was serialized in Young Ace from January 2019 to May 2020 and published on two volumes.

== Characters ==
Rintarou Magami (真神凛太郎, Magami Rintarō)
An overpowered Japanese boy who's done everything in his life and was ostracized by people for being too good at things. For the same reason, his parents ended up abandoning him by taking a work trip and never returning and only leaving behind a note. Out of boredom, he aids Luna, the weakest King candidate as her vassal for fun. He is later revealed to be the reincarnation of Merlin. It is later revealed in vol. 1 that he and Luna are childhood friends for a month in her hometown of Winchester, England during summer. Ironically, he does not know Luna is his childhood friend until near the end of vol. 4. According to vol. 4, Rintarou approached Luna as kids because she caught his attention and found her cute. In the end, he took the 2nd seat of the new version of Knights of the Round Table.
Luna Artur (瑠奈アルトゥール, Runa Arutūru)
An English-Japanese girl who is the weakest King candidate. She is the student council president of Camelot International High School. She forces Sir Kay to wear skimpy outfits to earn money as an escort and to promote her student council presidency campaign as an idol. She sold her Excalibur for money to prevent Monstre corp. from buying the school but she later got it back after Rintarou broke in Monstre headquarters and stole back her sword. She is disowned by her family after an offscreen incident where she got mad at her dad and beat him up, chewed him out, and publicly humiliated him. It is later revealed in vol. 1 that she and Rintarou are childhood friends for a month in her hometown of Winchester, England during summer. It is also revealed that Luna wanted to be King out of a childhood promise with Rintarou where she would make him her vassal when she becomes King. According to vol. 4, Luna was approached by Rintarou as kids because she caught his attention and he found her cute. In the end, she took the 1st seat of the new version of Knights of the Round Table.
Sir Kay (ケイ, Kei)
King Arthur's foster sister and a member of the Knights of the Round Table who takes the 3rd seat of the original and new versions. Kay serves as Luna's Jack and acts as her self-proclaimed older sister. She is forced by Luna to wear skimpy outfits to earn money as an escort and to promote Luna's student council presidency campaign as an idol. She is initially cautious of Rintarou but later accepts him. Despite accepting Rintarou, she doesn't approve Luna getting close with him and would rather let her date other men instead of Rintarou. She is the weakest Knight of the Round Table. She was the minister of the state during the time of King Arthur.
Felicia Ferald (フェリシアフェルラルド, Ferishia Ferurarudo)
Luna's former friend from Northern Ireland who is also a King candidate. Her family, despite their lineage and high status, are destitute and suffering from financial strife. According to her, potatoes are considered a luxury in her family. In the end, she took the 6th seat of the new version of Knights of the Round Table.
Sir Gawain (ガウェイン, Gawein)
King Arthur's nephew and a member of the Knights of the Round Table who takes the 8th seat in the original version while he takes the 7th seat in the new version. He serves as Felicia's Jack. He is married to Ragnelle. He is responsible for the death of Sir Lamorak with the help of Gaheris, Agravain, and his half sister Sir Mordred before Sir Lamorak returned as Emma's Jack.
Emma Michelle (エマ ミシェール, Ema Mishēru)
A French girl who's a representative of the Religious Order of Saint Joan and its prized pupil who is called La Pucelle, the Saint of Salvation. She met Rintarou while he was wandering around in Orléans and was briefly taught sword fighting by him. She and Luna compete for Rintarou's affections and his place as their own vassal. In the end, she took the 5th seat of the new version of Knights of the Round Table.
Nayuki Fuyuse (冬瀬那雪, Fuyuse Nayuki)
The student council secretary of Camelot International High School who is secretly a member of the Dame du Lac/Ladies of the Lake. She is later revealed to be the reincarnation of Nimue who was Merlin's love interest in the past. She still retains some feelings for Rintarou in the present. In the end, she took the 4th seat of the new version of Knights of the Round Table.
Sir Galahad (ガラハッド)
The 17 year old daughter of Sir Lancelot and a member of the Knights of the Round Table who takes the perilous 13th seat, Siege Perilous in the original and new versions. She's the only knight who cleared the quest to obtain the Holy Grail during the time of King Arthur. An old friend of Sir Kay who later becomes Luna's other Jack after the Holy Grail grants her a round fragment which would allow her to be in the physical world. In the 5th and final vol., she develops feelings for Rintarou and competes with Luna and the other girls for his affections at the end of the novel. She is the 2nd strongest in the group behind Rintarou.

== Media ==
=== Light novels ===
The light novels are written by Taro Hitsuji and illustrated by Kiyotaka Haimura. Fujimi Shobo published the first volume under their Fujimi Fantasia Bunko imprint on July 20, 2018. The series ended in its fifth volume, which was released on January 18, 2020.

At Anime NYC 2018, Yen Press announced they licensed the series for English publication.

==== Volumes ====
| No. | Original release date | Original ISBN | English release date | English ISBN |
|---|---|---|---|---|
| 1 | July 20, 2018 | 978-4-04-072829-2 | July 30, 2019 | 978-1-97-535750-4 |
| 2 | November 20, 2018 | 978-4-04-072831-5 | June 23, 2020 | 978-1-97-539927-6 |
| 3 | April 20, 2019 | 978-4-04-073180-3 | November 17, 2020 | 978-1-97-531047-9 |
| 4 | August 20, 2019 | 978-4-04-073183-4 | March 23, 2021 | 978-1-97-531652-5 |
| 5 | January 18, 2020 | 978-4-04-073477-4 | July 20, 2021 | 978-1-97-532206-9 |

=== Manga ===
A manga adaptation, illustrated by Yuzuriha, started serialization in Kadokawa Shoten's Young Ace on January 4, 2019. The series concluded in Young Ace on May 2, 2020. The individual chapters were collected into two tankōbon volumes.

In March 2020, Yen Press announced they would also publish the manga in English.

==== Volumes ====
| No. | Original release date | Original ISBN | English release date | English ISBN |
|---|---|---|---|---|
| 1 | July 4, 2019 | 978-4-04-108241-6 | September 22, 2020 | 978-1-97-531628-0 |
| 2 | June 4, 2020 | 978-4-04-108858-6 | March 30, 2021 | 978-1-97-532096-6 |

== Reception ==
Sean Gaffney from A Case Suitable for Treatment praised the first volume for its fights, stating it was a good read overall. Demelza from Anime UK News also praised the first volume for its plot and illustrations.

Antonio Mireles from The Fandom Post praised the first volume of the manga adaptation, though also noted that it ends a bit prematurely. Grant Jones from Anime News Network was more critical, calling it incredibly generic.

== See also ==
- Akashic Records of Bastard Magic Instructor, another light novel series by Taro Hitsuji
