= Nocturnal Illusion =

1995 video game

- Developer: Apricot
- Publishers: JP: Excellents Japan; NA: JAST USA
- Platforms: NEC PC-98, Windows
- Release: JP: April 22, 1995; NA: April 15, 1998
- Genres: Visual novel, eroge
- Mode: Single-player

Nocturnal Illusion (夢幻夜想曲, Mugen Yasoukyoku; lit. Illusionary Nocturne) is a Japanese eroge visual novel, developed by Excellents Japan. It was translated into English and released in the United States in 1998. After the original localization company, RCY Brothers, went out of business, JAST USA acquired the rights to re-release the game.

In 1998, a 2-CD revised version of the game with better graphics and audio, including voice acting for character dialogue, was released in Japan, by Apricot.

== Gameplay ==
Nocturnal Illusion's is a graphic adventure game wherein the player clicks on text representing actions to take, such as "look at X", "think about X", "fight", "wait". A text box onscreen displays narration and dialogue.

== Plot ==
The player character, Shinichi Kashiwagi, is lost. Dissatisfied with the direction his life is talking, he decides to get away from it all during his spring break and stay in the mountains in order to find himself. Towards the end of his vacation he's made little progress when he is caught unprotected in a typhoon, and blown over a steep incline (losing consciousness). A mysterious woman saves him and uses sexual pleasure to keep him warm. It turns out that he is now in a mansion that is outside of regular time and space, with a gate that only opens when it chooses (while not explained who does it, food and such necessities are left at the gate by some unknown force). The woman who saved Shinichi is the mistress in charge of the place. Shinichi explores the mansion and meets many women, which leads to sexual experiences with all. Many other people live there, but no one can seem to answer any questions about the mysterious place. Shinichi tries to leave, but can't open the gates. The mansion holds everyone captive. The others have given up; they are resigned to staying at the mansion for eternity. At the end of the game, the gate opens and Shinichi can choose either to stay or take one woman out of the mansion.

== Characters ==
Shin'ichi Kashiwagi (柏木慎一, Kashiwagi Shin'ichi)
The protagonist of the game. He has been studying law a Toshima University. His life is at a crossroads, though; he's not sure what type of life he wishes to lead. He arrives at the mansion after encountering a typhoon. He must escape the place to win the game. At the completion of the game, he can choose one girl as his partner to leave the mansion.

Mistress (館の女主人, Yakata no Onna Shujin; lit. "Mansion's Landlady")
The mistress in charge of the mansion, she refuses to even give Shinichi her name. She has an almost psychic ability to foretell when someone will arrive at the mansion and always seems to know what's going on. Most of her communication with Shinichi is cryptic, making it difficult to know how much she knows about the mansion.

Miwako (美和子)
The mansion's shy maid. Her bashful nature causes her discomfort when she first meets Shinichi. She always seems sad but insists on keeping the cause a secret. When she was 14 she was sent away from her family to be a servant to a rich family (Shinichi remarks that this makes her quite ancient, though the mysterious mansion keeps her young).

Maya (摩耶)
A journalist who has had previous bad experiences with men and despises them (due to overhearing people saying things like "she's just a woman" and that she should become a house wife). Her competitiveness gives her personality a hard, grating edge. She claims to hate all men, but she gets along well enough with Shinichi, and eventually stops hating men so much.

Misao (深沙緒)
A girl who became separated from her parents and grew up in the mansion. Due to this, she is very childlike and extremely innocent, even to the point she doesn't know about sex. Outspoken, athletic, and a tomboy, she likes to tease Shinichi, especially when he persists in trying to escape the mansion.

Sari (沙里)
A mysterious woman who does not know how long she has been waiting for her lover to return. She appears only at night and never leaves the garden, always waiting for her lover to return.

Yukina (雪菜)
A very shy woman who spends most of her time in her room. It is revealed that when she was found by the mistress outside the mansion, she had attempted suicide but was regretting it deeply screaming "I don't want to die." She is terrified of Shinichi to the point where he can't get out more than a few sentences before she runs away screaming.

Yura (由羅)
Yura comes from a traditional Japanese family, and is always dressed in a pure white silk kimono. She is very sheltered and has little knowledge of the outside world. She spends most of her time in a temple-like building, guarded by a demon.

Arisa (亜瑠沙)
A young girl who is older than she appears. Her true nature is unknown. Shinichi often has visions of her, but she isn't seen around the mansion. Even in those visions though, Arisa seems childish and playful.

Red Riding Hood (赤頭巾ちゃん, Akazukin-chan)
Assaulted by a wolf; Shinichi saves her.

Mermaid (人魚姫, Ningyohime)
Lives inside a well but is saved by Shinichi who helps her return to the ocean. This character is based on the tale of The Little Mermaid, but somewhat more sinister in some parts. While she made a deal with a sea witch to go onto land to see the prince she loved, the prince loved someone else and as per the witch's deal, it was either the prince falls in love with her or she would turn into sea foam. As she was pregnant with the prince's child, the witch made another deal - if she would kill the prince with a pair of scissors, she would survive. She did this, somehow ending up in the mansion's well.

Kusayama
A computer programmer who ended up in the mansion after an alcohol binge. He invites Shinichi to drink in his room leading to them both collapsing from the amount of alcohol drunk. At various points, he attempts to rape first Maya, then Yukina, but is stopped by Shinichi. His main activities are to fantasize about the girls in the mansion and finding another substance to imbibe.
