= Humanity Has Declined =

Japanese light novel and anime series

- First light novel volume cover

人類は衰退しました (Jinrui wa Suitai Shimashita)
- Genre: Fantasy comedy; Post-apocalyptic
- Light novel
- Written by: Romeo Tanaka
- Illustrated by: Tōru Yamasaki (2007–2011); Sunaho Tobe
- Published by: Shogakukan
- Imprint: Gagaga Bunko
- Original run: May 24, 2007 – September 16, 2016
- Volumes: 9 + 2 specials
- Manga

Jinrui wa Suitai Shimashita: Nonbirishita Hōkoku
- Written by: Romeo Tanaka
- Illustrated by: Takuya Mitomi
- Published by: Shogakukan
- Imprint: Ikki Comix
- Magazine: Monthly Ikki
- Original run: November 25, 2011 – May 25, 2012
- Volumes: 1
- Manga

Jinrui wa Suitai Shimashita: Yōsei, Shimasu ka?
- Written by: Romeo Tanaka
- Illustrated by: Terae Kichijō
- Published by: Media Factory
- Magazine: Monthly Comic Alive
- Original run: January 27, 2012 – January 27, 2013
- Volumes: 3
- Manga

Jinrui wa Suitai Shimashita: Nonbirishita Hōkoku 4-koma
- Written by: Romeo Tanaka
- Illustrated by: Takuya Mitomi
- Published by: Shogakukan
- Magazine: Monthly Ikki
- Original run: June 25, 2012 – August 25, 2012
- Anime television series
- Directed by: Seiji Kishi
- Written by: Makoto Uezu
- Music by: Kow Otani
- Studio: AIC A.S.T.A.
- Licensed by: AUS: Hanabee; NA: Sentai Filmworks; UK: Animatsu Entertainment
- Original network: TV Saitama, tvk, Tokyo MX, Sun TV, CTC, TV Aichi, BS11, AT-X
- Original run: July 2, 2012 – September 17, 2012
- Episodes: 12
- icon

Humanity Has Declined (人類は衰退しました, Jinrui wa Suitai Shimashita), or Jintai (人退) for short, is a Japanese light novel series written by Romeo Tanaka. The novels originally featured illustrations by Tōru Yamasaki for the first six volumes, but Yamasaki was replaced by Sunaho Tobe in 2011. Shogakukan published 11 volumes from May 2007 to September 2016. Three manga adaptations have been produced. An anime adaptation produced by AIC A.S.T.A., directed by Seiji Kishi, and written by Makoto Uezu aired in Japan between July and September 2012. Sentai Filmworks has licensed the anime in North America.

== Plot ==
Humanity Has Declined is set in a post-apocalyptic world where the human civilization has regressed and humanity keeps decreasing in numbers. The story follows an unnamed girl who acts as a mediator between humanity and the "fairies" who are small elf-like creatures attracted by sweets and happy things, but also have the habit to cause trouble to her with their powers in their endless search for amusement.

== Characters ==
Protagonist (主人公, Shujinkō)
Voiced by: Mai Nakahara
Generally referred to as either "I" (わたし, Watashi) or "Ms. Sweets" (お菓子ちゃん, Okashi-chan), the heroine is a sensible mediator between humankind and the fairies. She is one of the few humans left capable of creating sweets, which causes the fairies to naturally flock to her. Having observed the slow decline of humanity, her outlook on life is grim.
Grandfather (祖父, Sofu)
Voiced by: Unshō Ishizuka
The protagonist's grandfather, a researcher and firearm fanatic. Thanks to the fairies, he met with his granddaughter when he was 13 years old and a time paradox was created.
Assistant (助手さん, Joshu-san)
Voiced by: Jun Fukuyama
A young boy in a Hawaiian shirt who almost never speaks and serves as the protagonist's assistant.
The Fairies (妖精さん, Yōsei-san)
Voiced by: Yumiko Kobayashi, Sayaka Aoki, Satomi Akesaka, Nozomi Sasaki, Hisako Kanemoto, Satomi Arai
They are mysterious beings with advanced technology that could be called magic. The fairies have permanent smiles on their faces and very literal, honest viewpoints on everything. Despite their cute appearance, they seem to have a total disregard for human safety. The presence of many fairies is supposed to increase one's fortunes, but they cause potentially fatal situations. They often request sweets from the protagonist in exchange for their assistance.
Y
Voiced by: Miyuki Sawashiro
An old classmate of the protagonist's whose job is to identify human artifacts. She discovers a yaoi doujinishi from our era, however, and then spends her time self-publishing yaoi doujinshi.
Pion/P-ko (ぴおん/P子)
Voiced by: Nana Mizuki
A humanoid robot with cat ears. She makes sound effects whenever she acknowledges something of interest. Her original name is "Pioneer".
Oyage/O-taro (おやげ/O太郎)
Voiced by: Nobuyuki Hiyama
Pion's partner, who she is searching for. His original name is "Voyager".
Curly (巻き毛, Makige)
Voiced by: Hisako Kanemoto
The protagonist's classmate from her school days, who is disturbingly affectionate.

== Media ==
=== Light novels ===
Humanity Has Declined began as a light novel series written by Romeo Tanaka. Shogakukan published 11 volumes between May 24, 2007, and September 16, 2016, under their Gagaga Bunko imprint; nine comprise the main story, while the other two are short story collections. For the first six volumes, the novels featured illustrations by Tōru Yamasaki, but he was replaced by Sunaho Tobe in 2011. Shogakukan republished the novels with Tobe's illustrations between November 18, 2011, and March 16, 2012.

==== Volumes ====
| No. | Release date | ISBN |
|---|---|---|
| 1 | May 27, 2007 | 978-4-0945-1001-0 |
| 2 | December 18, 2007 | 978-4-0945-1044-7 |
| 3 | April 18, 2008 | 978-4-0945-1061-4 |
| 4 | December 18, 2008 | 978-4-0945-1104-8 |
| 5 | January 19, 2010 | 978-4-0945-1183-3 |
| 6 | February 18, 2011 | 978-4-0945-1255-7 |
| 7 | July 18, 2012 | 978-4-0945-1353-0 |
| 8 | February 19, 2013 | 978-4-0945-1393-6 |
| 9 | July 18, 2014 | 978-4-0945-1393-6 |
| Extra 1 | December 18, 2014 | 978-4-0945-1525-1 |
| Extra 2 | September 16, 2016 | 978-4-0945-1632-6 |

=== Manga ===
One chapter of a manga adaptation, illustrated by Rei Neyuki, was published in Shogakukan's Monthly Ikki magazine on January 25, 2010; however, the manga went on an indefinite hiatus and was ultimately cancelled. Another manga, illustrated by Takuya Mitomi, titled Jinrui wa Suitai Shimashita: Nonbirishita Hōkoku (人類は衰退しました のんびりした報告), was serialized in the same magazine from November 25, 2011, to May 25, 2012. Its chapters were collected in a single tankōbon volume, released on July 30, 2012.

Mitomi also illustrated the four-panel comic strip manga Jinrui wa Suitai Shimashita: Nonbirishita Hōkoku 4-koma (人類は衰退しました のんびりした4コマ), was serialized in Monthly Ikki from June 25 to August 25, 2012. A manga illustrated by Terae Kichijō and titled Jinrui wa Suitai Shimashita: Yōsei, Shimasu ka? (人類は衰退しました ようせい、しますか?) was serialized in Media Factory's Monthly Comic Alive between January 27, 2012, and January 27, 2013. Three compiled volumes have been released.

=== Anime ===
An anime television series adaptation produced by AIC A.S.T.A. and directed by Seiji Kishi aired in Japan between July 2 and September 17, 2012; it was also simulcast by Crunchyroll. The screenplay was written by Makoto Uezu, and the chief animation director Kyūta Sakai based the character design used in the anime on Sunaho Tobe's original concepts. Six bonus episodes were included on the Blu-ray Disc and DVD releases. The opening theme is "Real World" (リアルワールド, Riaru Wārudo) by Nano Ripe and the ending theme is "Yume no Naka no Watashi no Yume" (ユメのなかノわたしのユメ, My Dream Within a Dream) by Masumi Itō. Sentai Filmworks has licensed the series for subtitled BD/DVD release in North America in December 2013.

==== Episodes ====
| No. | Title | Original release date |
|---|---|---|
| 1 | "The Fairy's Secret Factory (Part 1)"; Transliteration: "Yōsei-san no, Himitsu no Kōjō" (Japanese: 妖精さんの、ひみつのこうじょう) | July 2, 2012 |
In a world where humanity is nearing extinction, the main character, a girl who acts as a mediator with fairies, is sent to turn butcher chickens, but the chickens escape. After some strange FairyCo products show up in the village, including a tonic that restores her hair, the heroine, her grandfather, and her assistant go to a fairy factory where mass-produced fairy products are made.
| 2 | "The Fairy's Secret Factory (Part 2)"; Transliteration: "Yōsei-san no, Himitsu no Kōjō" (Japanese: 妖精さんの、ひみつのこうじょう) | July 9, 2012 |
The heroine and her assistant become lost after being separated from her grandfather and the receptionist. She soon gets separated from her assistant and comes across the factory's manager, who directs her to an off-limits area so she can try to find the upper management. She soon discovers the factory is run by a group of intelligent plucked chickens who plan to take over the world. They are soon stopped by the arrival of the assistant and his camcorder, which drives them to commit suicide. After freeing all the trapped fairies, the heroine finds that her hair has been brought to life due to the tonic.
| 3 | "The Fairies' Subculture (Part 1)"; Transliteration: "Yōsei-san-tachi no, Sabukaru" (Japanese: 妖精さんたちの、さぶかる) | July 16, 2012 |
A woman named Y who supposedly works in researching the Human Monument manages to find a disc full of data inside an old mansion, which turns out to be a volume of a yaoi manga. She soon gets into the habit of publishing yaoi manga which she distributes across the country. When the fairies catch wind of the trend and start publishing their own yaoi manga, Y begins to work harder to compete, bringing about a manga renaissance. However, her manga becomes too heavy that the couriers do not want to deliver the boxes themselves, leading her to create a dōjin fair. Some time later, the heroine discovers a mysterious dōjin which traps her and Y inside a blank panel.
| 4 | "The Fairies' Subculture (Part 2)"; Transliteration: "Yōsei-san-tachi no, Sabukaru" (Japanese: 妖精さんたちの、さぶかる) | July 23, 2012 |
Exploring the strange world they winded up in, the heroine and Y encounter her assistant, who had also gotten himself stuck. They deduce that in order to proceed through the panels, they must do something dramatic enough to make a printed sound effect materialize. They also realize they can draw things into existence, as well as understand that if their manga becomes too boring, they will descend into cancellation. As such, the trio start going through various genres to make it through the manga world. After encountering some fairies, they realise that in order to escape, they need to reach the ending, though a desire for ratings soon leads the stories into a complicated mess. The manga soon becomes unpopular and ends up getting cancelled, but thankfully they manage to end up back in the real world.
| 5 | "The Fairies' Homecoming (Part 1)"; Transliteration: "Yōsei-san-tachi no, Osatogaeri" (Japanese: 妖精さんたちの、おさとがえり) | July 30, 2012 |
As the village prepares an electric-powered festival for the Human Monument Project, the heroine hears from the fairies that they are leaving to avoid the electromagnetic waves from the festival that are deadly to them. They leave behind a good luck charm and a curious manual explaining the dangers that come if no fairies are met during the day. During the festival, the heroine meets a curious girl named Pion, who is searching for her companion. The next day, the heroine and her assistant are sent to explore an underground structure, where they get trapped. As they search for the exit, the charm the heroine received turns into a fairy who tries to lead them towards water but instead comes across a group of acidic slimes. As they face more dangers upon reaching a computer room, they are rescued by Pion.
| 6 | "The Fairies' Homecoming (Part 2)"; Transliteration: "Yōsei-san-tachi no, Osatogaeri" (Japanese: 妖精さんたちの、おさとがえり) | August 6, 2012 |
As Pion, revealed to be a robot who the heroine now calls P-ko, joins the party, they encounter her companion Oyage, a similar robot who calls himself O-taro, who wants to abandon his mission and live in the strange city. As he sends a killer digger truck after them, they all fall down a hole, winding up at an underground castle. The heroine and assistant are confronted by O-taro, who combines with the slimes to become a 'Killer Death Cat', though the fairies step in to help them. With help from the fairies, P-ko manages to defeat O-taro using a super powered microwave, which in turn restores their memories. After the gang manage to escape the city, it is revealed P-ko and O-taro, whose real names are Pioneer and Voyager, were deep space probes that gained humanoid form. Alluding to the Pioneer anomaly, O-taro makes P-ko realize that deep inside, like himself, she does not want to leave the warmth of the Solar System. Hearing these thoughts, the heroine sabotages the electric generator, stopping P-ko and O-taro from being able to leave before reworking them to become wind-up powered.
| 7 | "The Fairies' Time Management (Part 1)"; Transliteration: "Yōsei-san-tachi no, Jikan Katsuyō Jutsu" (Japanese: 妖精さんたちの、じかんかつようじゅつ) | August 13, 2012 |
As the heroine is sent by her grandfather to look for his assistant, she encounters someone who looks exactly like her. Things only get stranger as she starts to encounter a lot of deja vu and encounters more versions of herself, with no clear memory over what is happening. She soon learns it to be the work of the fairies, who are manipulating time in order to get several copies of the heroine to make sweets for them. After several loops resulting in hundreds of clones making sweets, the heroine soon encounters a village full of dogs where the assistant lies.
| 8 | "The Fairies' Time Management (Part 2)"; Transliteration: "Yōsei-san-tachi no, Jikan Katsuyō Jutsu" (Japanese: 妖精さんたちの、じかんかつようじゅつ) | August 20, 2012 |
As the heroine reflects on her multiple timeloops, she focuses on the details about the assistant given to her by her grandfather and the doctor looking after him. During a certain timeloop between the fourth and fifth times, the fairies make a bug which takes the heroine "far away", where she encounters a boy whom she thinks is the assistant, finding him to be an excitable and lecherous young boy who calls himself the Ringo Kid. It turns out that Ringo Kid was the younger version of the heroine's grandfather from the distant past. After hearing more about him from her doubles during the fifth time, the heroine meets the assistant on the sixth, finding him to have a gentler and plain personality, believing he had finally found his own personality, using the doubles to get opinions from others about how he should be.
| 9 | "The Fairy's Survival Skills"; Transliteration: "Yōsei-san no, Hyōryū Seikatsu" (Japanese: 妖精さんの、ひょうりゅうせいかつ) | August 27, 2012 |
After an increase in fairy population leads to bullying, the heroine is sent to accompany asylum seeking fairies to find a new home for them. Through various circumstances, the heroine ends up stranded on an island in the middle of a lake, along with a group of pessimistic fairies who declare her the queen of their new nation. The fairies' motivation to work on building their new nation soon increases their population. The nation soon evolves into a bustling civilization dedicated to serving its queen, who begins living in luxury. Upon cultivating a plant that can produce candy, the fairies' research and development soon turn the nation into a literal candy island. However, after a lapse in judgement causes everyone to build monuments everywhere, the island is soon ruined and devoid of food and water, sending it into poverty. The heroine feels they should leave the island, but remains trapped by a rainstorm caused by the collective depression of the fairies. After the island ends up collapsing on itself, the heroine returns to dry land and her daily life.
| 10 | "The Fairy's Earth"; Transliteration: "Yōsei-san no, Chikyū" (Japanese: 妖精さんの、ちきゅう) | September 3, 2012 |
The heroine begins her job as a mediator and finds it not to be what she expected. Whilst observing an abandoned site, she encounters a group of fairies and brings some of them home with her. After getting over the initial worries, the heroine finds the fairies to be quite talkative and curious and gives them some names, only to be tasked with naming all the other fairies as well. Finding the abandoned site she found them at turned into a metropolis overnight, she gives the fairy population a naming dictionary so they can decide on their own names. The next day, the heroine finds herself hailed as a god and ends up causing chaos when she tries to pass the responsibility onto someone else, leading the city to be destroyed.
| 11 | "The Fairy's Secret Tea Party (Part 1)"; Transliteration: "Yōsei-san no, Himitsu no Ochakai" (Japanese: 妖精さんの、ひみつのおちゃかい) | September 10, 2012 |
The heroine thinks back to when she was ten and began attending school, having to start at the lowest grade. As she decides to remain inconspicuous and focus on skipping through the grades, she finds herself the target of bullying from some of the other students, including a young Y, leading her to alienate a girl referred to as 'Curly' who tries to become her friend, believing her to be the mastermind. One day, the heroine rescues a fairy from a group of bullies and has it tag along with her. As the stress of her school life leads the heroine to admit to herself that she feels lonely, the fairy does something before disappearing. The heroine finds Curly has joined her in skipping grades, also facing some bullying from jealous peers. As the heroine decides to repay some of her kindness, she finds Curly to be disturbingly affectionate with her. Curly then moves into the heroine's dorm and invites her to join a secret organisation called the Wildrose Society.
| 12 | "The Fairy's Secret Tea Party (Part 2)"; Transliteration: "Yōsei-san no, Himitsu no Ochakai" (Japanese: 妖精さんの、ひみつのおちゃかい) | September 17, 2012 |
Whilst spending time having tea parties with the Wildrose Society, the heroine learns that Y was once part of the society. A year later, the heroine moves up to year 4 and becomes Y's classmate. She soon learns Y had been stealing books to build her own yaoi library. In exchange for her not revealing her secret, Y sneaks the heroine into the rooms of the other Wildrose members, revealing their hidden agendas, including how mentally unstable Curly is. After learning all of this, the heroine joins Y in searching for a true fairy tea party, and over the years they rekindle with the Wildrose Society. As the heroine, Y and Curly discover a room full of robots, the heroine remembers about the fairy she met years ago. After everyone graduates and the school is torn down, the heroine is visited by Y, who brings her the robot from the school dorms, which is soon revealed to contain the fairy she had met at school.

Bonus episodes

| No. | Title | Original release date |
|---|---|---|
| EX01 | "Mankind's Survival of the Fittest #1"; Transliteration: "Ningen-san no, Jakuniku Kyōshoku #1" (Japanese: 人間さんの、じゃくにくきょうしょく #1) | September 19, 2012 |
Whilst sorting through a box of curious items left behind by the fairies, the heroine finds a spoon that lets her scoop flour out of her head. However, she ends up overusing it and winds up small.
| EX02 | "Mankind's Survival of the Fittest #2"; Transliteration: "Ningen-san no, Jakuniku Kyōshoku #2" (Japanese: 人間さんの、じゃくにくきょうしょく #2) | October 17, 2012 |
Unable to get help from the grandpa, due to the way her miniature form transforms her speech patterns, the heroine searches for the fairies but comes up against a hungry bird.
| EX03 | "Mankind's Survival of the Fittest #3"; Transliteration: "Ningen-san no, Jakuniku Kyōshoku #3" (Japanese: 人間さんの、じゃくにくきょうしょく #3) | November 21, 2012 |
After narrowly escaping the bird, the heroine meets an intelligent hamster named Yameta whose civilization is under threat from weasels.
| EX04 | "Mankind's Survival of the Fittest #4"; Transliteration: "Ningen-san no, Jakuniku Kyōshoku #4" (Japanese: 人間さんの、じゃくにくきょうしょく #4) | December 19, 2012 |
The weasels' attack sends the heroine flying into a pond, where she is rescued by a handsome looking fairy.
| EX05 | "Mankind's Survival of the Fittest #5"; Transliteration: "Ningen-san no, Jakuniku Kyōshoku #5" (Japanese: 人間さんの、じゃくにくきょうしょく #5) | January 16, 2013 |
The heroine gives up on trying to find a way to change back and enjoys her luxurious new life. However, whilst doing some cooking, she ends up using the spoon on herself again, becoming even smaller. She soon learns that the spoon converts her intelligent thoughts into flour, shrinking her to match her intelligence.
| EX06 | "Mankind's Survival of the Fittest #6"; Transliteration: "Ningen-san no, Jakuniku Kyōshoku #6" (Japanese: 人間さんの、じゃくにくきょうしょく #6) | February 20, 2013 |
The fairies' realizing that she is shrinking, take her to her own home without realizing that they are the same person thinking that they can get some help. There they find more of the flour (which used to be her brains) with which they proceed to make cookies. Accidentally eating one before dying, the heroine realizes that it restored some of her intelligence and height. By keeping the fairies from eating the freshly made cookies, she ends up eating all of them and going back to normal.

== Reception ==
The Encyclopedia of Science Fiction described Humanity Has Declined as an entertaining but sometimes bewildering anime, comparing its mixture of absurd situations and intellectual references to Lewis Carroll's Alice's Adventures in Wonderland. It highlighted the contrast between the Fairies' childlike behavior and their extraordinary technological capabilities, as well as the protagonist's amusingly dry and resigned responses to their unpredictability. The encyclopedia particularly noted the series' use of satire, including its parody of manga conventions and fandom, and its treatment of social organization and ecological collapse. It also emphasized the juxtaposition of surreal humor with scientific concepts such as quantum decoherence. Although it found that not every episode or joke succeeded, it concluded that the series offered much to enjoy.
