= Kiyotaka Haimura =

Japanese artist

Kiyotaka Haimura (灰村キヨタカ or はいむらきよたか, Haimura Kiyotaka, born September 7, 1973) is a Japanese game character designer and manga style artist best known for his work on the A Certain Magical Index series.

== Works ==
=== Illustration ===
- A Certain Magical Index
- Sprite Spiegel
- Maid Deka
- Is It Wrong to Try to Pick Up Girls in a Dungeon?: Sword Oratoria
- Last Round Arthurs: Scum Arthur and Heretic Merlin
- Qualidea Code

=== Character design ===
- Hotel ergriffen (2001)
- Kokyu Shohu (2002)
- Minato Genso (2003)
- Yume Miru Kusuri: A Drug That Makes You Dream (2005)
- Fire Emblem Heroes (2017)
