= Season of the Sakura =

1996 video game

- Developer: Tiara
- Publishers: JP: JAST; NA: JAST USA
- Platforms: MS-DOS, Microsoft Windows
- Release: JP: April 1996; NA: 1997
- Genre: Dating sim
- Mode: Single-player

Season of the Sakura (Note: Japanese: さくらの季節, Hepburn: Sakura no Kisetsu) is a 1996 dating sim for MS-DOS and Windows. The game involves the student Shuji Yamagami who meets eight different women and tries to have sex with one before the school year is over. The game as a bishōjo game which are games that feature a male protagonist meeting attractive anime-styled women and an eroge, a term for Japanese erotic games where incorporate various amounts of sexual content into either the narrative or gameplay. The player tries to connect with a potential woman by choosing various menu-based options through the year.

Season of the Sakura was developed by the company Tiara and was among the first games released by JAST USA, who were among the first Western distributors to release eroge games from Japan in English. Academics Mark Kretzschmar and Sara Raffel described Season of the Sakura as "the first big push" to release eroge to Western audiences. The game received positive reviews for its writing and replay value in Animeco and by Kretzschmar and Raffel respectively, while both viewers commented the game for being strictly for adults or problematic due to some of its adult themes.

== Gameplay and plot ==
Seasons of the Sakura is a dating sim game and bishōjo game, with the latter game involving playable characters meeting attractive anime-styled women.

Season of the Sakura has been described as a dating sim and an eroge and bishōjo game. In dating sims, the player is in the role of a student and follows their process of getting to know women of the same age by spending certain periods of time in the game. The character also experiences various events that occur as a result of the daily choices he or she makes. The bishojo description is a sub-genre of the dating sim, that describes a game where that the playable male character interacts with attractive anime-styled girls. As an eroge (erotic game), the style ranges from games that emphasize sexual content over storytelling to games that incorporate sexual content loosely into their stories as well as games that require sexual content to advance a purposely disturbing story.

In Season of the Sakura, the player controls Shuji Yamagami, a college student, who interacts with eight different women over the course of a year. The players control menu options such as "Talk", "Think" and "Go" and can select options to perform said actions. The goal is pick choices in the game to find of the women to have sex with them. Various bad endings can occur along the way to halt the players progress.

== Development and release history ==
Season of the Sakura was developed by the company Tiara and released in Japan in April 1996.

It was distributed in the West by JAST USA. The company was established in 1996 and was one of the first to publish and port Japanese visual novel and dating sims to the West. The company started as J-List and eventually partnered with the Japanese company JAST. They mostly distributed Japanese games, specifically ones with pornographic themes known as eroge.

JAST USA briefly sold titles such as Three Sisters' Story (1996) and Song of the Sakura as a company named Sakura Soft. Song of Sakura was the second release for JAST USA, and was released in 1997 for Windows 95-based computers and MS-DOS. JAST USA's founder Peter Payne later said "We often take our cues from Japanese companies, and one thing a lot of them do is create brands for publishing of different games." While previous eroge titles were released in the West such as Cobra Mission (1991), academics Mark Kretzschmar and Sara Raffel described Season of the Sakura as "the first big push" to release eroge to Western audiences.

== Reception ==
In the American anime and manga fandom magazine Animeco, a reviewer found Story of Sakura well-written but cautioned readers that there were only about four scenes of "hentai"-quality, they suggested it would only be appropriate for adults.

Writing in Vice, Luke Winkie commented on the game finding it featured a lot of cheesy but wholesome Japanese comedy while finding the sex scene at the end with the girl was a let down due to "hilariously uncomfortable English translation" and concluded that that there was a lot in Season of the Sakura that was "earnest and sweet" and that it was a "a silly game, but maybe that's the point." Kretzschmar and Raffel wrote in 2023 that Season of the Sakura featured an impressive amount of replay value for a dating sim due to its multiple dating routes and endings. They also said the combination of Season of Sakura's humorous tone and sexually explicit content was "occasionally problematic", such as a route where the protagonist's homeroom teacher volunteers to be their first sexual encounter.

== See also ==
- List of eroge
- Video games in Japan
