= Kana: Little Sister =

1999 video game

- Developer: D.O.
- Publisher: NA: G-Collections
- Director: Takahiro Yatabe
- Producer: Ryūichirō Fujisawa
- Designers: Takahiro Yatabe; Tomoyuki Iguchi
- Programmer: Takahide Kojima
- Writer: Romeo Tanaka (under pseudonym Hajime Yamada)
- Composers: Hechima; Hideki Takahashi
- Platforms: Microsoft Windows, Mac OS, PlayStation Portable
- Release: Microsoft Windows: JP: June 25, 1999; NA: August 7, 2002; Mac OS: JP: June 30, 2000; NA: August 7, 2002; PlayStation Portable: JP: October 7, 2010
- Genres: Eroge, visual novel
- Mode: Single player

Kana: Little Sister (加奈～いもうと～, Kana～Imōto～), is a Japanese visual novel originally developed and released by D.O. in 1999. G-Collections translated and published the English version in 2002.

Kana: Little Sister has received widespread attention from the eroge player community. The plot was well-received by critics. However, reactions to the endings and the relationship between Takamichi and Kana were mixed.

== Gameplay ==
Kana: Little Sister is a visual novel, which falls into the subgenre of "nakige". The player assumes the role of Takamichi Toudou. Most of the gameplay is spent reading text, representing the story's dialogue. In the PSP version, the text is accompanied by character sprites, which represent who Takamichi is talking to, over background art. Throughout the game, the player encounters CG artwork in the story.

Kana: Little Sister follows a branching plot line with multiple endings, and depending on the decisions that the player makes during the game, the plot will progress in a specific direction. Being an erotic visual novel, relationships between characters become sexual; this include the sexual relationship between Takamichi and his younger sister Kana Toudou. The game has six different endings.

== Plot ==
Kana Toudou (藤堂 加奈, Tōdō Kana) suffers a chronic kidney disease that requires her to be hospitalized for long periods of time. Although her older brother Takamichi Toudou (藤堂 隆道, Tōdō Takamichi) resents the resulting diversion of attention from their parents, he changes his attitude towards Kana during a family trip; Kana and her family are separated, so Takamichi must find her in the forest. During the searching process he makes a promise to always protect Kana no matter what.

Takamichi falls in love with his classmate Yumi Kashima (鹿島 夕美, Kashima Yumi) while studying in Year 5, so he writes her a love letter and leaves it on her desk. However, other classmates know about his feelings towards Kashima and start teasing him the next day. He believes that Kashima deliberately showed the love letter to everyone, stops communicating with her until he graduates from high school, and concentrates on looking after his younger sister. Kana relies on her brother for emotional support as she rarely goes back to school.

Kana develops romantic feelings for Takamichi when he graduates from high school. During that same period, Kashima confesses her feelings for Takamichi. At this time, however, Kana's condition deteriorates, and she is given a few months left to live at most. Takamichi begins a relationship with Kashima while studying at university. However, his feelings for Kana begin to bother him, and he becomes aware of the fact that Kana is not related to him by blood. After this, the plot will unfold differently depending on the player's previous choices, and Kana dies in most endings.

== Development and release ==
Kana: Little Sister is the first visual novel developed by D.O., and was released for Windows on June 25, 1999. The game's First Press Limited Edition included a Kana-themed mobile phone charm. The novel marked Hajime Yamada's debut as a scenario writer. Yamada continued to work for D.O. after the game's release, going on to write the scenario for the visual novels Hoshizora ☆ Planet and Family Project. Alongside Kana: Little Sister, these three works became known as "Hajime Yamada Trilogy" by D.O staff.

The development team stated in an interview that, despite the "novel-like game" moniker, they still consider Kana: Little Sister a proper game because it allows the player to unravel the story's contents, as other video games do. They also regard games in the visual novel genre as sharing the same advantages as a novel, including the use of an interesting writing style and the involvement of the player's imagination when self-inserting as the protagonist. The team prioritized these aspects of the genre when developing Kana: Little Sister. According to Japanese magazines BugBug and Tech Gian, the novel portrays a feeling of caring for each other that goes beyond "love" or "physical attraction." The team also stated that the game has a gentle atmosphere.

An email application featuring Kana, where the user was prompted by Kana on-screen when an email was sent, was released on March 17, 2000. On that same day, a remastered Windows edition of the game was released under the title Kana... Okaeri‼ (加奈⋯おかえり！！; Kana… Welcome Home!!). This new version retains the original story line but features new character designs and full voice acting. A Mac OS version was subsequently published on June 30, 2000. In 2003, Panther Software announced plans to release an Xbox port, which was ultimately cancelled.

As reported by GNN News and Game Watch in July 2010, Cyber Front announced that the game would be ported to the PlayStation Portable in two different editions, Regular Edition and Limited Edition. The latter was to be bundled with the game's soundtrack and art book. The PSP version of the game featured the character designs and artwork from the original PC version of the game, although with re-recorded voices and artwork created specifically for it. Cyber Front released two demo videos in July and August 2010. Both editions were released on October 7 2010. An English translation of Kana... Okaeri!! was released in 2015 by JAST USA.

== Reception ==
Kana: Little Sister has received widespread attention from the eroge player community. Some players have registered as bone marrow donors after playing the game. However, Kazuya Haneda's comment on Bishōjo Games Maniacs indicated that the game has received mixed reviews from players. When the game was released, it quickly became a hot topic on the Internet, with most online reviews focused on the plot and artwork; other online reviews have accused the game of sexualising minors because of Kana's appearance. In her Introduction to Cultural Studies on Adult Games, Naoki Miyamoto stated that Kana: Little Sister was considered, along with other games developed by Key, as masterpieces of "nakige" genre during the late 1990s.

The plot of Kana: Little Sister was well-received by critics, who felt that it deals with themes such as love, life and family. Au Yeung Yu Leung of IGN Japan voted the game as the best video game of 1999, comparing it to Air, and praised the game for its emotional portrayal of the relationship between Takamichi and Kana, as well as its ability to make one realize the value of life. In Complete Work on the History of PC Bishōjo Games this feeling was attributed to all players in general. The game is known for its "depressing" and "touching" story line. Pasokon bishōjo gēmu rekishi taizen: 1982-2000 specifically commented that the development of Takamichi and Kana's romantic relationship under their "tragic encounter" was "touching". In addition to the character's encounters, The Escapist's Leigh Alexander also found "simple empathy" for "well-drawn individuals". Haneda, on the other hand, criticized its setting as "too common", but also praised it for its unexpected mid-to-late development.

Another aspect of Kana: Little Sister that was commended includes the player's empathy. According to Pasokon bishōjo gēmu rekishi taizen: 1982-2000, the player would experience the same psychological pain as Takamichi. Au Yeung felt that Kana was her real-life younger sister while playing, and attributed this to the plot's focus on Kana. In Boku-tachi no bishōjo gēmu Kuronikuru 2, Hiroyuki Maeda surmised that the player's empathy came from the text, especially the psychological description of the characters.

Critics' responses to the endings and the relationship between Takamichi and Kana were mixed. Alexander said the incest was "handled delicately" in regards to Takamichi and his younger sister's relationship, which distinguishes it from other eroge. Au Yeung criticized the team for setting Kana as an adopted younger sister due to public's perception. Regarding the endings, Haneda mentioned the "Recollection" ending as the most touching, and felt that the ending where Kana survives became meaningful only after completing the other endings. Au Yeung, however, criticized the latter, calling it "unnatural" compared to the other endings as there's no explanation of Kana's miraculous recovery.

== See also ==
- Autumn in My Heart, a South Korean romantic television drama with a similar theme to Kana: Little Sister.
