= Reon Kadena =

Japanese gravure idol

- Born: Reon Kadena; February 19, 1986 (age 40); Sakai, Osaka, Japan
- Other names: Leon Kadena; Minamo Kusano
- Occupations: Glamour model; actress
- Years active: 2004–present

Reon Kadena (かでな れおん, Kadena Reon), also known as Leon Kadena or Minamo Kusano, is a Japanese glamour-model and actress.

== Life and career ==
Kadena was born in Osaka Prefecture on February 19, 1986. The former gravure idol had her first collection of nude photos published at age eighteen by Asahi Press in the photobook Naked Reon (はだかのれおん) in June 2004. Kadena also appeared in a number of glamour videos including the September 2005 Reon Style (レオンスタイル) released by Geneon Entertainment.

In July 2005, Kadena made her theatrical debut in the erotic drama Piikan Fūfu. Three years later in June 2008, she co-starred with fellow gravure idol Yuuri Morishita in the Toei comedy Secret Undercover Agent: Wild Cats in Strip Royale as secret agents Honey and Bunny who investigate strange incidents beyond the abilities of the regular police.

Kadena also appeared in a number of television dramas including being part of the regular cast for the TV Asahi action-mystery series Maid Deka (メイド刑事) which was broadcast in 11 episodes from June to September 2009. In 2010 she played the role of Eren Komori (小森絵漣) in Kamen Rider × Kamen Rider OOO & W Featuring Skull: Movie War Core, an installment in the long-running Kamen Rider Series of tokusatsu films.

== Filmography ==
=== DVDs ===
- Tri Puru H (2004, as Minamo Kusano)
- Leon (2004)
- Girl's Desire (2004) – also known as 'Gravure Idol'
- Virginity (2005)
- Reon Style (2005)
- Make You Happy (2006)
- My Reflection (2006)
- Memories (2006) – also known as 'Champion Gold Selection'
- Dream Planet (2007)

=== Films ===
- Piikan Fūfu (ピーカン夫婦) (July 2005)
- God's Left Hand, Devil's Right Hand (神の左手 悪魔の右手, "Kami no hidarite akuma no migite) (July 2006)
- The Making of Dark Fantasy (December 2006) [Documentary]
- Secret Undercover Agent: Wild Cats in Strip Royale (秘密潜入捜査官 ワイルドキャッツ in ストリップ ロワイアル, Himitsu sennyū sōsakan wairudokyattsu in sutorippu rowaiaru) (June 2008)
- Kamen Rider × Kamen Rider OOO & W Featuring Skull: Movie War Core (December 2010)
- Ichijiku no mori (無花果の森) (June 2014)
- The Pinkie (さまよう小指, Samayou Koyubi) (September 2014)

=== Television ===
- Kamen Rider Ghost as Alia

=== Video games ===
- Metal Gear Solid 3: Snake Eater as herself/model
