= Akashic Records of Bastard Magic Instructor =

Japanese light novel series and its adaptations

- First light novel volume cover featuring Sistine (middle), and Glenn (right)

ロクでなし魔術講師と禁忌教典〈アカシックレコード〉 (Roku de Nashi Majutsu Kōshi to Akashikku Rekōdo)
- Genre: Action, fantasy, harem
- Light novel
- Written by: Tarō Hitsuji
- Illustrated by: Kurone Mishima
- Published by: Fujimi Shobo
- Imprint: Fujimi Fantasia Bunko
- Original run: July 19, 2014 – November 17, 2023
- Volumes: 24
- Manga
- Written by: Tarō Hitsuji
- Illustrated by: Aosa Tsunemi
- Published by: Kadokawa Shoten
- English publisher: NA: Seven Seas
- Magazine: Monthly Shōnen Ace
- Original run: March 26, 2015 – June 25, 2021
- Volumes: 16
- Anime television series
- Directed by: Hiraku Kaneko (Note: According to animator Masaya Nozaki, who worked with Kaneko on several occasions, Minato Wato is a pseudonym of Kaneko's.)
- Produced by: Shintaro Yoshitake; Noritomo Isogai; Keisuke Arai; Takayuki Takagi
- Written by: Touko Machida
- Music by: Hiroaki Tsutsumi
- Studio: Liden Films
- Licensed by: Crunchyroll (streaming); SA/SEA: Medialink
- Original network: AT-X, Tokyo MX, MBS, TVA, BS11
- English network: SEA: Animax Asia
- Original run: April 4, 2017 – June 20, 2017
- Episodes: 12
- icon

Akashic Records of Bastard Magic Instructor (Japanese: ロクでなし魔術講師と禁忌教典(アカシックレコード), Hepburn: Roku de Nashi Majutsu Kōshi to Akashikku Rekōdo) is a Japanese light novel series written by Tarō Hitsuji and illustrated by Kurone Mishima. Fujimi Shobo has published twenty-four volumes from July 19, 2014, to November 17, 2023, under their Fujimi Fantasia Bunko imprint. A manga adaptation with art by Aosa Tsunemi has been serialized in Kadokawa Shoten's shōnen manga magazine Monthly Shōnen Ace from March 26, 2015, to June 25, 2021, and has been collected in sixteen tankōbon volumes. An anime television series adaptation by Liden Films aired from April to June 2017.

== Synopsis ==
Sistine Fibel and her best friend Rumia Tingel are students at a prestigious magical academy, where Sistine hopes to be trained to learn about Sky Castle as per her grandfather's last wish. When her favorite instructor suddenly retired, his replacement Glenn Radars is anything but what Sistine had hoped for. The "Bastard Magic Instructor" (BMI) appears to be lazy, incompetent, and not that skilled at magic. He is not a certified teacher nor does he have a high rating in the guild. What they do not know is that he is hiding his power and that he is a former assassin from the Imperial Court Mage Corps with a remorseful past who is suffering severe depression. Later, there is an attack on the school by the previous instructor, and the BMI is forced to show his true powers. Sistine is baffled as she had misjudged him to being incompetent. As the BMI's students draw him out of his depression, he finds meaning in the activity of teaching. This whole season is complete with a promise for eventful things to come. Topics that are dealt with are depression, friendship, family relationships, adoption, siblings, following one's dream, quest for power and more.

== Characters ==
Glenn Radars (グレン レーダス, Guren Rēdasu)
Voiced by: Sōma Saitō (Japanese); Jessie James Grelle (English)
Glenn is lazy, pervy and constantly bored by everything, with his primary focus being sleeping. He becomes the substitute teacher in Sistine's class, after the retirement of her favorite teacher. While he may seem incompetent, he is actually very skilled in magic, but not in the traditional sense. Glenn used to be as passionate about magic as Sistine, but became disillusioned by it due to his former partner Sara Silvers' death and his past as the infamous military assassin known as "The Fool." He developed his own type of magic, called "The Fool's World" which negates the activation of all magic within a certain radius, including his own. However, this does not nullify spells that have already been cast. While nullifying the enemies' magic he then beats them using superior hand-to-hand combat skills. He cannot use combat magic coherently due to it being far away from his area of expertise, but he has an in-depth understanding of the concept of all types of magic, which makes him a good instructor. This also places him in conflict with the traditional Professors who favor rote memorization.
Sistine Fibel (システィーナ フィーベル, Shisutīna Fīberu)
Voiced by: Akane Fujita (Japanese); Rachael Messer (English)
Sistine admires magic greatly and wishes to discover the secret of the Flying Castle, which no one knows. She maintains a strict, no-nonsense demeanor throughout, and often scolds Glenn for his lackadaisical attitude. She initially hates Glenn, believing him to be as incompetent as he looked due to his lack of enthusiasm. When he actually starts doing his job, however, she begrudgingly begins to respect Glenn as a highly effective teacher. Her personality and appearance resembles Sara Silvers, to whom Glenn was very close. As the series progresses, it seems as though Sistine has developed feelings for Glenn, but is too shy to speak of them. She is called "Sisti" by her sister Rumia, and "Punchie" (for her swift magical strikes) and "White Cat" (for her hair style) by Glenn.
Rumia Tingel (ルミア ティンジェル, Rumia Tinjeru)
Voiced by: Yume Miyamoto (Japanese); Monica Rial (English)
Rumia is Sistine's best friend and adopted sister. Sistine's parent adopted her after she was the sole survivor of an attack by evil mages. She is close to Glenn, who often treats her well, in contrast to the teasing that Sistine faces from him. Rumia's real identity is Princess Ermiana, the "cursed" princess who was supposed to have died three years ago. She remembered Glenn being the infamous assassin named "The Fool" who saved her life and that is why she is fond of him from the start. Rumia possesses a high level of spiritual essence as well as a unique ability known as Amplifier, which, as the name suggests, amplifies her spiritual essence.
Celica Arfonia (セリカ アルフォネア, Serika Arufonea)
Voiced by: Eri Kitamura (Japanese); Morgan Garrett (English)
Celica is an immortal mage and a professor at the academy. She adopted and apprenticed Glenn at a very young age and as such, she puts in a recommendation for him to be the substitute teacher despite his profile suggesting that he is unfit for the job. She forces Glenn to take the job against his will, hopeful that it may provide fulfillment to his life. She is a retired legendary Court Mage, known as the former Special Forces Executioner #21, "The World."
Albert Frazer (アルベルト フレイザー, Aruberuto Fureizā)
Voiced by: Hiroki Takahashi (Japanese); Austin Tindle (English)
A long-haired military magician with sharp eyes who is known as "The Star". He is partners with Re=L and another former colleague of Glenn, whose aid he occasionally enlists for military operations. He cares for his colleagues, but does not easily reveal or share these feelings out loud.
Re=L Rayford (リィエル レイフォード, Ryieru Reifōdo)
Voiced by: Ari Ozawa (Japanese); Leah Clark (English)
Re=L is a gluttonous girl with a stoic expression. She is known as "The Chariot", being highly skilled in creating giant swords through alchemy. She is an artificial human, a product of "Project: Revive Life", also known as "Project Re=L" which was led by Sion Rayford, the older brother of the girl from whom Re=L derives her appearance and memory. When Glenn and Albert shut the project down, they "adopted" her into the military. She did not know her true origins until later in the series. When she learns the truth and comes to accept it, she resolves to live on for Glenn's sake.
Eleanor Chalet (エレノア゠シャーレット, Erenoa Shāretto)
Voiced by: Yōko Hikasa (Japanese); Amanda Gish (English)
Voiced by: Sophie FRISON (French); Raquel Masuet (Portuguese)
The treacherous chief handmaiden of Queen Alicia VII. She is in fact a heretic mage of the Researchers of Divine Wisdom.
Sara Silvers (セラ=シルヴァース, Sera Shiruvāsu)
Voiced by: Minako Kotobuki (Japanese); Alexis Tipton (English)
Sara was a member of the Imperial Court Mage Corps and held position #3, "The Empress" and a former partner to Glenn Radars. Not much is known about her past. She was very close friends with Glenn, being his only reason to stay with the Imperial Mage Corps. She died due to an attack at the hands of Angel Dust addicts. According to Glenn, she was a cheerful and ebullient person, and very frequently noted to look like Glenn's student, Sistine. She was called "White Dog" by Glenn, much like how Sistine is called "White Cat".
Rito Librio (リト=リブリオ, Rito Biron)
Voiced by: Takuto Yoshinaga (Japanese); Orion Pitts (English)
He is a student of Class 4 in the Alzano Imperial Magic Academy.
Jatice Lowfan (ジャティス=ロウファン, Jatisu Roufan)
Voiced by: Tatsuhisa Suzuki (Japanese); Daman Mills (English)
A heretic mage and former Imperial Court Mage Corps member with the title "The Justice." He was responsible for the death of Glenn's former partner, Sara after being killed by a resident afflicted by Angel Dust during a mission to apprehend Jatice for his insurrection.
Eve Ignite (イヴ=イグナイト, Ivu Igunaito)
She is Glenn's superior and manager of the Imperial Mage Corps. In the past, she did not send reinforcements to Glenn and Sara, which in turn caused Sara's death. In the 7th volume, she met Glenn again and told him that she will show him that all of her opinions are right. Later she was saved by Glenn in the battle with Jatice and acts like a tsundere around him. In the 11th volume, she is an instructor and works together with Glenn. She shows some affection for Glenn, but tries to hide them.
Alicia VII (アリシア七世, Arishia Nana-sei)
Voiced by: Saori Onishi
The reigning Queen of Alzano, and is Rumia's biological mother. Given the "cursed" nature of her daughter, she personally asked Glenn, back then a mage for the Imperial court, for help in protecting her. She is also a close friend of Celica.
Alicia III (アリシア三世, Arishia San-sei)
She is Alicia VII's ancestor and the new director of the school where Glenn, Celica and Eve work as instructors. She was the Queen of the Alzano Empire. She warns Glenn not to use the backyard library as a battlefield.

== Media ==
=== Light novels ===
No.	Title	Release date	ISBN
1	Anata no Shitteru Sono Majutsu wa, Honmonodesu ka? (あなたの知ってるその魔術は、ホンモノですか？)	July 19, 2014	978-4-04-070231-5
2	Majutsu Kyōgi-sai Kaisai! Yūshō Kurasu no Tan'nin ni wa Tokubetsu Shōyo!? (魔術競技祭開催！優勝クラスの担任には特別賞与!?)	November 20, 2014	978-4-04-070232-2
3	Umibe no Rizōto-chi de Ensei Gakushū! Roku de Nashi Honryō Hakki!! (海辺のリゾート地で遠征学修！ ロクでなし本領発揮！！)	March 20, 2015	978-4-04-070515-6
4	Aku ni Honrō sa re Yuku Ryieru, Kono Konran wo Tomeru no wa--!? (悪に翻弄されゆくリィエル、この混乱を止めるのは−−!?)	July 18, 2015	978-4-04-070516-3
5	Funin Shite Kita Rinji Kōshi wa—— Shisutīna no Fianse!? (赴任してきた臨時講師は——システィーナの婚約者!?)	November 20, 2015	978-4-04-070517-0
6	Roku de Nashi Kōshi Tsuini Kubi!? Guren, Seito o Tsurete Kodai Iseki e! (ロクでなし講師ついにクビ!? グレン、生徒を連れて古代遺跡へ！)	June 18, 2016	978-4-04-070974-1
7	Teikoku Kyūtei Madō-shi-dan VS Ten no Chie Kenkyūkai! (帝国宮廷魔導士団VS天の智慧研究会！)	October 20, 2016	978-4-04-070975-8
8	Roku de Nashi, Tawawana Josei ni Natte Ojōsama Gakkō no Rinji Kōshi ni!? (ロクでなし、たわわな女性になってお嬢様学校の臨時講師に!?)	March 18, 2017	978-4-04-070976-5
9	Kore wa, "Fejite Saiaku no Mikkakan" no Joshō——. (これは、《フェジテ最悪の三日間》の序章——。)	August 19, 2017	978-4-04-072417-1
10	"Ōja no Hō"―― Akasa Reru "Rumia Tingel" no Himitsu. (《王者の法》――明かされる《ルミア・ティンジェル》の秘密。)	November 17, 2017	978-4-04-072419-5
11	Kyūtei Madō-shi-dan Eve Ignite, Gakuin Kōshi e Tenshin!? (宮廷魔導士団イヴ=イグナイト、学院講師へ転身!?)	March 20, 2018	978-4-04-072420-1
12	Majutsu Gakuinmae Gakki Yasumi! Gokkan no Sunoria Ryokō! (魔術学院前学期休み！ 極寒のスノリア旅行！)	July 20, 2018	978-4-04-072722-6
13	Onore ga Shin'nen no Tame ni Tatakae! Guren VS Aruberuto!! (己が信念のために戦え！ グレンVSアルベルト！！)	November 20, 2018	978-4-04-072723-3
14	Aruzāno Teikokudaihyō Senbatsu-sen, Kaimaku! (アルザーノ帝国代表選抜戦、開幕！)	March 20, 2019	978-4-04-072724-0
15	Majutsu Saiten, Hakunetsu! Saisoku no Kaze Tsukai VS. Honō no Majin!! (魔術祭典、白熱！ 最速の風使いVS.炎の魔神!!)	August 20, 2019	978-4-04-073272-5
16	Majutsu-shi no Kakugo to Kinki Kyōten no Sōran. (魔術師の覚悟と禁忌教典の騒乱。)	January 18, 2020	978-4-04-073273-2
17	Kōshaku-ka Igunaito no Uragiri. Kūdetā "Honō no Ittokihan" (公爵家イグナイトの裏切り。クーデター『炎の一刻半』)	July 17, 2020	978-4-04-073736-2
18	Taumu Tenmon Shinden, Merugariusu no Nazo - Kessen no Toki, Kitaru! (タウム天文神殿、メルガリウスの謎ーー決戦の時、来たる！)	December 19, 2020	978-4-04-073737-9
19	Ikutose no Toki o Koe ̄̄ Densetsu no Jidai ni, Guren ga Kakeru (幾年の時を超えーー伝説の時代に、グレンが駆ける)	June 18, 2021	978-4-04-074147-5
20	Takushita Omoi ga, Kiseki o Okosu! (託した想いが、奇跡を起こすーー！)	February 19, 2022	978-4-04-074148-2
21	Zettai Zetsumei no Fejite Kessen. Soshite, Otozureru Shōgeki no Makugire......!? (絶体絶命のフェジテ決戦。そして、訪れる衝撃の幕切れ......!?)	June 17, 2022	978-4-04-074579-4
22	Guren vs Jatisu! Tsuini Saishū Kessen no Maku ga Agaru (グレンvsジャティス！ ついに最終決戦の幕が上がる)	April 20, 2023	978-4-04-074580-0
23	Mayoikonda Yume no Sekai. Koko Kara Nukedasu Yuiitsu no Hōhō wa―― (迷い込んだ夢の世界。 ここから抜け出す唯一の方法は――)	October 20, 2023	978-4-04-075143-6
24	Soshite Ima, Kinki Kyōten no Shinjitsu ga Katara Reru―― (そして今、禁忌教典の真実が語られる――)	November 17, 2023	978-4-04-075184-9

=== Manga ===
The series has been licensed for an English release by Seven Seas Entertainment.

No.	Original release date	Original ISBN	English release date	English ISBN
1	November 26, 2015	978-4-04-103672-3	August 22, 2017	978-1-626925-38-0
2	December 26, 2015	978-4-04-103673-0	December 5, 2017	978-1-626926-65-3
3	May 26, 2016	978-4-04-104429-2	April 10, 2018	978-1-626927-17-9
4	October 26, 2016	978-4-04-104430-8	August 21, 2018	978-1-626928-46-6
5	March 25, 2017	978-4-04-104431-5	November 6, 2018	978-1-626929-51-7
6	September 26, 2017	978-4-04-106087-2	April 2, 2019	978-1-642750-19-5
7	February 26, 2018	978-4-04-106560-0	September 3, 2019	978-1-642756-90-6
8	July 24, 2018	978-4-04-107148-9	January 7, 2020	978-1-64505-182-4
9	November 26, 2018	978-4-04-107614-9	August 25, 2020	978-1-64505-469-6
10	March 26, 2019	978-4-04-107615-6	December 1, 2020	978-1-64505-732-1
11	August 26, 2019	978-4-04-108586-8	March 9, 2021	978-1-64505-799-4
12	December 26, 2019	978-4-04-108587-5	August 17, 2021	978-1-64827-243-1
13	June 26, 2020	978-4-04-109339-9	January 4, 2022	978-1-64827-472-5
14	October 26, 2020	978-4-04-109342-9	April 12, 2022	978-1-63858-183-3
15	March 26, 2021	978-4-04-109343-6	November 15, 2022	978-1-63858-597-8
16	August 26, 2021	978-4-04-111706-4	April 18, 2023	978-1-63858-823-8

=== Anime ===
An anime adaptation was announced in March 2016, which was later revealed to be an anime television series. The series was produced by Liden Films and directed by Hiraku Kaneko, with Touko Machida writing the scripts, Satoshi Kimura designed the characters and Hiroaki Tsutsumi composed the music. It aired from April 4, 2017, to June 20, 2017. The series ran for 12 episodes. The series' opening theme is "Blow Out" by Konomi Suzuki, and the ending theme is "Precious You" by Akane Fujita, Yume Miyamoto, and Ari Ozawa. Crunchyroll streamed the series with subtitles, and Funimation released it on home video as part of the two companies' partnership.

No.	Title (Note: All English titles are taken from Crunchyroll.)	Original release date
1	"The Unmotivated Bastard" "Yaruki no Nai Roku de Nashi" (Japanese: やる気のないロクでなし)	April 4, 2017
Sistine Fibel and Rumia Tingel, are heading for the institution; the Alzano Imperial Magic Academy located in the town of Fejite, south of Alzano Empire, when a man speedily rushes towards the two girls as he was running late; causing Sistine to react by using magic to throw him into the fountain. Their original professor for Sistine and Rumia's class, Huey, suddenly did not show up, and the entire class was aware that there is a new substitute for the time being. The substitute teacher turned out to be the same person Sistine and Rumia encountered earlier; he sloppily introduces himself as Glenn Radars. He was placed there on a recommendation by one of Alzano's professors Celica Arfornia, despite objections from the academy's headmaster Halley, who is aware that Radars seemingly has no known background to be fit to teach their students, and he never has a teaching license, nor he has any ambition. In his first day of school as a temp, he starts their self-study session and immediately takes a nap. His arrogant and lazy behavior continued on through the next day, to the point a frustrated Sistine threw the glove at Glenn's face, and challenges him to a magic duel, to which Glenn accepts, on his condition that both he and Sistine uses Shock Volt. The latter fires first, and Glenn was immediately zapped. However, to their surprise, he stood himself up and unsuccessfully attempts to fire Shock Volt. Despite that Sistine clearly won the duel, Glenn continues to spew his absurd behavior and calls it a draw, leaving Sistine remarking that there is no hope for him.
2	"Just the Slightest Bit of Motivation" "Hon'no Wazukana Yaruki" (Japanese: ほんのわずかなやる気)	April 11, 2017
The following day, Glenn's cocky and unmotivated behavior has not changed after the duel. Lynn asks Glenn about rune magic, but Sistine discourages her and offers to teach about magic instead. Upon being told that magic is served for a greater purpose, Glenn fires back, and openly states that magic is meant for murder. Feeling hurt by his response, Sistine slaps his face and storms out from the class in tears. Later, Rumia asked Glenn about his past life before becoming their substitute teacher. However, he stops short of the conversation before he could speak any further. Rumia then tells Glenn her reason for learning magic and why she is determined to help others is that she wanted to repay someone who had rescued her after she was kidnapped three years ago, and asks him to apologize to Sistine, as she is aware that magic is important for her after the passing of her late grandfather. The next morning, Glenn apologizes to Sistine after admitting he took it too far despite his hatred of magic, before he immediately goes on to criticize the entire class for not mastering Shock Volt, revealing that it was simply not powerful enough with their current chanting method. He then explains his students to think radically about the meaning of magic and their chants in order for the Shock Volt to be more effective, even he went as far as to cast Shock Volt with his own simple chant, and urging students to not use the magic textbook, thus the entire class slowly started to gain interest and respect for Glenn. The following day, terrorists belonging to the group Researchers of Divine Wisdom surround the academy with a magical barrier to keep others away and held students there hostage with their intention to find Rumia; who is revealed to be the former second princess of the Alzano Empire named Erumiana. Rumia turns herself in to prevent any harm on other students and while she is being taken by Reik, Jin forcibly pulled Sistine to the alchemy lab and was about to rape her, just as when Glenn appears in the last second. Using his own Original Magic; The Fool's World, which completely blocks all magic in a certain area, and his skillful hand-to-hand combat, he easily knocks the assailant out cold, leaving Sistine dumbfounded and even more frustrated.
3	"The Fool and Death" "Gusha to Shinigami" (Japanese: 愚者と死神)	April 18, 2017
4	"The Magic Competition" "Majutsu Kyōgi-sai" (Japanese: 魔術競技祭)	April 25, 2017
5	"The Queen and the Princess" "Joō to Ōjo" (Japanese: 女王と王女)	May 2, 2017
6	"The Evil Being" "Jaakunaru Sonzai" (Japanese: 邪悪なる存在)	May 9, 2017
7	"The Sea of Falling Stars" "Hoshi Furu Umi" (Japanese: 星降る海)	May 16, 2017
8	"The Fool and The Star" "Gusha to Hoshi" (Japanese: 愚者と星)	May 23, 2017
9	"The Reason to Live" "Ikiru Imi" (Japanese: 生きる意味)	May 30, 2017
10	"Gold Digger?!" "Gyaku Tama!?" (Japanese: 逆玉！？)	June 6, 2017
11	"Face-off! The Mage Corps Battle" "Kessen! Madō Heidan-sen" (Japanese: 決戦！魔導兵団戦)	June 13, 2017
12	"Finding One's Own Place (Note: For episode 12 the title was "The Place Found for Oneself" which is taken from Crunchyroll, as Funimation had this title.)" "Mitsuketa Ibasho" (Japanese: 見つけた居場所)	June 20, 2017

== See also ==
- Last Round Arthurs, another light novel series by Taro Hitsuji
