= ZyX (brand) =

Japanese video game maker

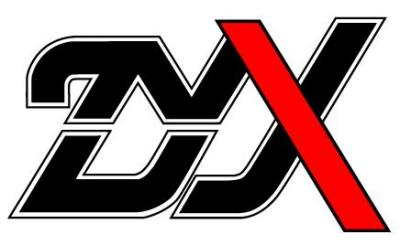
- Product type: Computer games
- Current owner: Contents Traffic
- Country: Japan
- Introduced: 1994
- Website: zyx-game.co.jp

ZyX is a Japanese erotic bishōjo video game maker. Some of their products have been localized in North America by JAST USA under the G-Collections label, and most of them feature designs by either Masahiro Yamane or Keiji Muto.

In May 2009, ZyX was integrated into Contents Traffic Co., Ltd. (株式会社コンテンツトラフィック, Kabushiki-gaisha Kontentsu Torafikku).

== List of games ==
Games are arranged alphabetically by romaji title; modified Hepburn romanization is used.

Japanese Title	Romaji Title	English (North American) Title
あめいろの季節	Ameiro no Kisetsu	
微熱教師ちえり	Binetsu Kyōshi Chieri	Amorous Professor Cherry
Chain 失われた足跡	Chain Ushinawareta Sokuseki	Chain ~ The Lost Footprints
エンジェルクライシス	Enjieru Kuraishisu [Angel Crisis]	
エッチなバニーさんは嫌い？	Ecchi na Banii-san [Bunny-san] wa Kirai?	Do You Like Horny Bunnies? ~ H na Bunny wa Kirai?!
エッチなバニーさんは嫌い?2	Ecchi na Banii-san [Bunny-san] wa Kirai? 2	Do You Like Horny Bunnies? 2 ~ H na Bunny wa Kirai?!
フォルトゥーナ Stories Act.1	Forutoūna [Fortuna] Stories Act. 1	
フォルトゥーナ Stories Act.2	Forutoūna [Fortuna] Stories Act. 2	
学園爆裂転校生	Gakuen Bakuretsu Tenkōsei	
雷の戦士ライディ	Ikazuchi no Senshi Raidi	Lightning Warrior Raidy
雷の戦士ライディII	Ikazuchi no Senshi Raidi 2	Lightning Warrior Raidy II: Temple of Desire
雷の戦士ライディIII	Ikazuchi no Senshi Raidi 3	Lightning Warrior Raidy III
淫内感染	Innai Kansen	
淫内感染2	Innai Kansen 2	
淫内感染 午前3時の手術室	Innai Kansen Gozen 3-toki no Shujutsushitsu	
Interactive Mar-jang ハコてん雀	Interactive Mar-jang Hakoten Suzume	
拐〜カドワカシ〜	Kai ~ Kadowakashi ~	
狂拳伝説クレイジーナックル	Kyō Kobushi Densetsu Kureijii Nakkuru [Crazy Knuckle]	
狂拳伝説クレイジーナックルII	Kyō Kobushi Densetsu Kureijii Nakkuru [Crazy Knuckle] II	
Let's!パイレーツ	Let's! Pairētsu [Pirates]	
魔剣少女エンヴィー～Blade of Latens・炎の継承者～	Maken Shoujo Envy — Blade of Latens · Honoo no Keishousha	
未来ドーター	Mirai Dōtā [Daughter]	
リングアウト!!	Ringu Auto [Ring Out]!! (also: Pro Lesring Ring Out!!)	Ring Out
籠絡〜淫戯に堕ちる〜	Rōraku ~ Ingi ni Ochiru ~	
相楽さん家の悦楽ライフ♪	Sagara-san chi no Etsuraku Raifu [Life] ♪	The Sagara Family
サナトリウム	Sanatoriumu [Sanatorium]	
Shi/Ko/Mi	Shi/Ko/Mi	
出血簿	Shukketsubo	Virgin Roster
憑き	Tsuki	Tsuki ~ Possession
憑き 盲目の巫女〜散華〜	Tsuki Mōmoku no Miko ~ Sange ~	
トワイライトホテル 〜夜鳴の詩〜	Towairaito Hoteru [Twilight Hotel] ~ Yoru Mei no Shi ~	
妖鬼討伐忍法帳	Yōki Tōbatsu Ninpōchō	

Note: This list does not include all of the variations in the releases (CD-ROM, DVD-ROM, DVDPG ("DVD Players [sic] Game"), collections, and other reissues), only the primary games.
