= Maid Deka =

Series of Japanese novels

- Cover of the first light novel

メイド刑事 (Meido Deka)
- Genre: Action
- Light novel
- Written by: Yūji Hayami
- Illustrated by: Kiyotaka Haimura
- Published by: SoftBank Creative
- Imprint: GA Bunko
- Original run: April 15, 2006 – July 15, 2009
- Volumes: 9
- Manga
- Written by: Yūji Hayami
- Illustrated by: Michiko Usami
- Published by: Flex Comix
- Magazine: FlexComix Blood (former); FlexComix Next
- Original run: October 12, 2007 – December 16, 2008
- Volumes: 3
- Television drama
- Directed by: Kojiro Fujioka; Tomohiko Yamashita; Hajime Hashimoto
- Original network: TV Asahi
- Original run: June 26, 2009 – September 11, 2009
- Episodes: 11

Maid Deka (メイド刑事(デカ), Meido Deka; "Maid Detective") is a Japanese light novel series written by Yūji Hayami and illustrated by Kiyotaka Haimura. The first novel was released on April 15, 2006, and as of July 15, 2009, nine volumes have been published by SoftBank Creative under their GA Bunko imprint.

A manga adaptation by Michiko Usami was serialized on Flex Comix's free web comic FlexComix Blood and FlexComix Next. A TV drama adaptation aired in July 2009 on TV Asahi.

== TV series ==
Maid Deka was broadcast on TV Asahi in 11 episodes from June 26 to September 11, 2009. The series starred Saki Fukuda as maid Aoi Wakatsuki who is actually an undercover detective sent to investigate crimes at wealthy estates. The official English title is Housemaid Cop.

=== Cast ===
- Saki Fukuda as Aoi Wakatsuki
- Ryuuji Harada as Inspector Toshiaki Kaido
- Koji Matoba as Masaharu Kaji
- Yoko Oshima as Sakura Tsubouchi
- Toru Shinagawa as Asakusa
- Megumi Nakayama as Reiko Momose
- Reon Kadena as Yoko Ito
