= Do You Like Horny Bunnies? =

2001 video game

- Developer: ZyX
- Publishers: JP: ZyX; NA: G-Collections
- Platform: Microsoft Windows
- Release: JP: March 30, 2001; NA: March 5, 2003
- Genre: Eroge

Ecchi na Bani-san wa Kirai? (Japanese: エッチなバニーさんは嫌い?; "You Don't Hate Sexy Bunnies, Right?" localised as Do You Like Horny Bunnies?) is a bishōjo game developed by ZyX and released by G-Collections in 2001.

The game is a multi-scenario eroge. The main character is 18-year-old Yukari Fujisawa, a feminine-looking Japanese boy who has never had sex. He starts working as a waiter in a membership restaurant, Platinum, where all the female employees wear Playboy bunny suits. Soon he finds out that the other wait staff, including his own cousin Sae Ishigami, have unusual sexual tendencies.

A sequel, Do You Like Horny Bunnies? 2, which is set in another branch of Platinum with cameos from the original's characters, was also released in 2002.

== Story ==
Yukari Fujisawa is a boy who was employed by the exclusive Platinum restaurant because he was mistaken for a girl. His female coworkers will soon figure it out, and the discovery will either ruin his job or make his and their lives much easier and more exciting.

== Gameplay ==
At the beginning of the game, the player learns about Yukari Fujisawa's life. If the player selects options that do not lead the protagonist to a specific possibility too many times, Yukari will get fired, and the player will be forced back to the title screen.

== Sequel ==
A sequel titled "Do You Like Horny Bunnies? 2" was released in 2002. The game focuses on a new character, Kazuma Takatsuki, and the story takes place in another branch of the Platinum. The game also features cameos of characters from the original game.
