= Yume Miru Kusuri: A Drug That Makes You Dream =

2005 video game

- Developer(s): Rúf
- Publisher(s): JP: Rúf; NA: Peach Princess
- Artist(s): Kiyotaka Haimura
- Writer(s): Kyōta Kanō, codeX Ltd. (Mareni)
- Composer(s): Funczion Sounds
- Platform(s): Microsoft Windows
- Release: JP: December 22, 2005; NA: April 4, 2007
- Genre(s): Eroge, visual novel
- Mode(s): Single Player

Yume Miru Kusuri: A Drug That Makes You Dream (ユメミルクスリ) is an adult visual novel for Windows developed by Rúf. The visual novel was initially released in Japanese on December 22, 2005 and translated into English by Peach Princess. It was illustrated by Kiyotaka Haimura. According to Peter Payne, founder of Jast USA, it is believed the writers were trying to explore themes relevant in Japan for high-school students.

== Plot ==
Kouhei Kagami is a Japanese student with excellent grades and a fairly normal social life, but feels empty and transparent inside. The story revolves a pivotal moment in Kouhei's life where three girls, that have more problems than himself, meet him for the first time and soon make his life a roller coaster of emotions. Kouhei must choose to save one of them from their own despair.

The plot follows the same basic route for the first half of the game. Kouhei goes about his life and makes friends with three main girls: Aeka, Mizuki, and Nekoko.

== Release ==
Rúf initially released the game in Japanese on December 25, 2005 and was later reprinted on March 19, 2009. The game was translated into English by Peach Princess and released April 25, 2007.

== Characters ==
=== Main characters ===
Kouhei Kagami (加々見 公平, Kagami Kōhei)
Kouhei is an average Japanese high school student of the class. He sometimes has a hallucination about a passing train while he is bored or otherwise unoccupied. The player experiences the game as Kouhei.

Aeka Shiraki (白木 あえか, Shiraki Aeka)

Voiced by: Shiho Kawaragi

Aeka has been struggling with problems, initiated usually by Kyoka. Most of the people around her taunt her for almost her entire enrollment at Kouhei's school. The whole class tends to laugh at her or not hang out with her, even if they're not directly involved in bullying her.

Mizuki Kirimiya (桐宮 弥津紀, Kirimiya Mizuki)

Voiced by: Ryoko Tanaka

Mizuki is the student council president that works in class. To people who don't know her, she is the typical student idol, out of reach to most. To those who do know her, she can sometimes be busy and strict, as she pushes all of the work onto other people. Mizuki comes from a rich family and doesn't see her own future, even the most simple one of living to the next day - something most people take for granted.

Cat Sidhe Nekoko (ケットシー・ねこ子, Kettoshī Nekoko)

Voiced by: Kayo Nagata

Kouhei discovers Nekoko outside of his workplace one day. She claims to be a fairy, and enlists Kouhei to help her find the home of the fairies. However, as he associates with her, Kouhei finds that this is not her real problem. Her happy ending reveals her true name to be Hiroko.

=== Supporting characters ===
Misaki Sayama (狭山 みさき, Sayama Misaki)

Voiced by: Riko Hirai

Misaki is a female friend of Kouhei's. She tries to get him not to interfere with Aeka because she doesn't want him to be picked on, though she does appear to have sympathy for Aeka. Often converses with Takeshi.

Takeshi Iogi (井荻 剛史, Iogi Takeshi)

Voiced by: Michihiko Hagi

Takeshi is a male friend of Kouhei's. He generally ignores what happens in class, being a very lazy and unproductive person, but still knows the situation with Aeka. He is less sympathetic towards her than Misaki is. Often converses with Misaki.

Kyoka Nanjou (南条 京香, Nanjō Kyōka)

Voiced by: Kana Yoshikawa

Female student in Kouhei's class. She has a grudge against Aeka Shiraki and is the cause of why the class picks on her so much. She likes to flirt with everyone, especially Kouhei, being overly friendly towards him. Kouhei comes to dislike her cruel personality, and gives her the nickname Antoinette, after Marie Antoinette, because of her attitude.

Aya Kagami (加々見 綾, Kagami Aya)

Voiced by: Kaori Suzumoto

Aya is Kouhei's adopted sister. Kouhei was adopted into the family, and thus has trouble seeing them as people who love him. He often makes fun of Aya's flat chest. It's rumored that she was one of the possible endings before it was cut prior to the Japanese release.

Hirofumi Tsubaki (椿 弘文, Tsubaki Hirofumi)

Voiced by: Kisho Taniyama

Hirofumi is the manager of the convenience store where Kouhei works, and has a friendly relationship with him. Hirofumi is homosexual and often teases Kouhei in a playful manner, but promises not to touch Kouhei if he can help it. He is always trying to get Kouhei to play h-games, specifically the kind with storylines as that is what Hirofumi likes, regardless of the sexual orientation.

Gaito Yakushiji (薬師寺 概人, Yakushiji Gaito)
Gaito is a male student who was suspended for a long time before coming back to school. He is supposed to be Kyoka's boyfriend, but she tries to distance herself from him. He tried to cheat on her with Aeka in the past which led to Kyoka's cruel treatment of Aeka.

== Aeka's path ==
If the player follows this story arc, Kouhei begins to pay closer attention to Aeka Shiraki, a girl in his class who is mistreated by her classmates. He begins a friendship with her, not thinking much of the situation, but after she almost commits suicide, Kouhei agrees to begin a sexual relationship with her and help her with her troubles. They eventually develop feelings for each other, and Kouhei distances himself from his classmates, choosing not to let her be mistreated alone.

=== Aeka's happy ending ===
With Kouhei's help, Aeka becomes stronger and overcomes the situation, eventually attacking (and almost killing) the bullying leader, Antoinette, after an incident where Antoinette's group tries to rape her in front of Kouhei. After this incident, both lovers abandon the school, and Aeka ends up adopted by Kouhei's parents, working part-time at a bakery. They plan on continuing their education, moving away, and becoming more independent in the future.

=== Aeka's unhappy ending ===
One day, Aeka will simply disappear. Kouhei will learn through gossiping that she eventually tried to commit suicide by jumping. She survives, but at the end of the game her condition is critical. Furthermore, now that the player has snubbed Antoinette's minions, Kouhei becomes the new target of their bullying.

== Mizuki's path ==
If the player follows this story arc, Kouhei begins a troubled relationship with the high school student council president, Mizuki Kirimiya. After going to Hong Kong, snorting cocaine and practicing strangulation sex with Mizuki, Kouhei returns to Japan, faces the consequences of his actions, and struggles to maintain his relationship with Mizuki.

=== Mizuki's happy ending ===
After a final night of passion, Mizuki disappears. Kouhei becomes the new head of the Student Council, and nobody but him seems to care about the former president. One day, Kouhei comes back home and finds Mizuki waiting for him, visibly pregnant. Disinherited by her family, but still rich and talented, she's adopted by Kouhei's parents. She moves to Kouhei's house and gives birth to their daughter.

=== Mizuki's unhappy ending ===
After a final night of passion, Mizuki disappears. Kouhei becomes the new head of the Student Council, and nobody but him seems to care about the former president. Kouhei even paid a private detective to look for her, but the results were unfortunate; Mizuki had died of pre-eclampsia, or pregnancy toxemia. She was buried alone, in a nameless grave, and thus erased from the collective memory.

== Nekoko's path ==
If the player follows this story arc, Kouhei becomes involved with a girl calling herself Cat Sidhe Nekoko and claiming to be looking for the home of the fairies. Kouhei, who has been forcefully asked to help her, believes Nekoko is crazy, but after ingesting some of the powder she claims is fairy dust, he realizes that she is addicted to a new type of drug. Kouhei attempts to help her with her addiction. Near the ending, Nekoko's supply of the drug becomes depleted; during a difficult withdrawal, Nekoko believes that Kouhei is a monster. When her parents intervene, Kouhei sees that Nekoko is Hiroko, the painfully shy girl who runs the school library, who took the drug to escape from the world she feels she cannot fit into. Kouhei and Nekoko take one more hit of the drug, and both climb to the top of a high tree in the town square, both believing that they can see the "fairy's home" appearing in the clouds above them. Nekoko asks if Kouhei will accompany her there, and he refuses.

=== Nekoko's happy ending ===
Nekoko turns away from the clouds, saying that the image cannot be the real fairy's home if Kouhei would not join her there. They climb down the tree and she apparently returns home and is hospitalized for drug rehabilitation. Two years pass. Suddenly, Kouhei sees on TV an ad about a new amusement park called Cat Sidhe Wonderland. Even more, he receives by mail two invitations to the inauguration. Kouhei goes, thinking he may learn about Nekoko, but she's nowhere to be found. The intercom tells him to go to the Ferris Wheel. There, Nekoko and Kouhei meet again, and promise eternal love.

=== Nekoko's unhappy ending ===
Nekoko apparently enters the fairy's home alone and disappears, possibly in fact having killed herself in a fall from the tree. Months pass, and there is still no sign of Nekoko. The police investigate and question Kouhei a few times, but to no avail as Kouhei has no new information. One day, when he's out shopping he recognizes a familiar voice in the crowd, and manages to catch a glimpse of Nekoko. Nekoko soon vanishes leaving Kouhei to wonder if seeing her was just a dream, and he begins to believe he made a terrible mistake by not joining her, and to wish to find the fairy's home again for himself.
