= Snow Sakura =

2003 video game

- Cover of the visual novel showing Misaki
- Developer(s): D.O.
- Publisher(s): JP: D.O.; NA: G-Collections
- Platform(s): Microsoft Windows
- Release: JP: November 28, 2003; NA: 2007
- Genre(s): Eroge, visual novel, bishōjo game, comedy
- Mode(s): Single-player

Snow Sakura (Japanese: 雪桜, yukizakura) is a visual novel first developed and published by D.O. and released on November 28, 2003. This interactive fiction game was translated into English language and then published by G-Collections in December 2007. The visual novel follows the story of Yuuji Tachibana who moves to Hokkaido unwillingly after having a strange dream about a girl by a sakura tree. He eventually falls in love with one of the girls in the village of the player's choosing, and learns the secret of his dream.

== Story ==
Yuuji Tachibana recently moved in with his cousin and uncle after his parents go on a business trip to Hawaii. Left in the care of his uncle at his inn in Hokkaido, Yuuji struggles to get used to his surroundings. Shortly after arriving, Yuuji is enrolled in the local high school and makes friends with four students within a week. Yuuji first meets Sumiyoshi and subsequently become best friends, while Yuuji's cousin Saki helps him ease in with her group of friends. Saki's friends include Misaki, who seems to get nervous around Yuuji, Kozue who seems obsessed with Misaki, and Rei who is a second year high school student and a shrine maiden at the local temple. In addition, Yuuji also gets to know his teacher Misato and discovers that she is Misaki's older sister. While playing some video tapes his father sends back from Hawaii, Yuuji learns that aside from the teasing, he wants him to find someone to fall in love with. The player can choose one of five females to fall in love with which progresses the plot along, eventually leading to a good or bad ending.

== Characters ==
Yuuji Tachibana (たちばな ゆうじ, Tachibana Yuji)
Voiced by: Hiro Shimazaki
Yuuji is the main playable character in the series. He is a student whose parents moved to Hawaii for a period of time for a business-related reason. Before leaving, his parents enroll him in a school in Hokkaido and leave him in the care of his uncle. Yuuji is also reunited with his cousin and childhood friend Saki who lives with her dad (Yuuji's Uncle). About a week after he is first sent to Hokkaido, he has a strange dream of a girl talking about a snow sakura tree but wakes up before she could finish what she was going to say. Throughout the series, it is revealed through the other characters that Yuuji bears a striking resemblance to his father, something he dreads.

Saki Tachibana (橘 沙紀, Tachibana Saki)
Voiced by: Yukari Aoyama
Saki is Yuuji's cousin, she has blonde hair and blue eyes and wears black ribbons in her hair which is in the form of twin tails. She lives with her father in a house that used to be a ryokan. Rather than a cousin, she feels more like a friend to Yuuji. When the user chooses Saki, their relationship grows and it is revealed that she has loved Yuuji ever since they were five years old, with him being her first love. She fills in Yuuji's fragmented dream of a girl talking about the Snow Sakura tree by saying that it was her. Saki tells Yuuji that while they were little she asked him to play with her and while doing so asked him to be her husband, which he accepted. Yuuji's uncle accepts Saki's love, and goes out of his way to protect it, her friends are supportive as well. After losing her virginity to Yuuji, she begins making advances to him while in school something that gets her into trouble. Her uncle is able to help her out in the end by surprisingly announcing her engagement to Yuuji. Two years later Saki is married and living happily with Yuuji, reopening their family inn with her dad as the owner.

Misaki Soya (宗谷美咲, Soya Misaki)
Voiced by: Suzune Asakura
Misaki is one of Yuuji's classmates, she has brown hair and blue eyes with a white ribbon in her hair. A popular student, because of her looks she is a target of her male classmates, her best friend is Kozue. When the user chooses Misaki their relationship grows. Eventually it is found out that she met Yuuji when they were kids. Misaki lost a glove with a bunny on it and Yuuji found it for her, this girl ends up being the girl in Yuuji's dream in this take. Later on, things get more complicated when an accidental kiss by Saki in front of Misaki causes her to run away. Saki confesses her love to Yuuji but he declines it and chases after her leaving his cousin behind. With his friends help including Saki who realizes her love is not requited, Misaki and Yuuji mend back their relationship. Years later the two are married with the final scene showing them with a toddler they had together. They named the girl Sakura after the tree in the town, and have the glove framed as a symbol of their love.

Kozue Hiyama (桧山こずえ, Nichiyama Kozue)
Voiced by: Miyabi Shion
Kozue is Misaki's best friend, she has brown eyes and black hair with two braids tied with red ribbons in the front. Her hobby is photography and, like Yuuji she is not native to Hokkaido. Kozue has some Yuri tendencies saying out loud more than once that Misaki makes her "heart throb". Kozue later replies though that she admires her the most denying that she her-self is a lesbian. When the user chooses Kozue, her first reaction to Yuuji is trying to push him towards loving Misaki to his surprise. After Yuuji pushes his feelings Kozue finally confesses her love to Yuuji though after New Year's Day. Everyone eventually finds out that Kozue and Yuuji are a couple expect for Misaki. Knowing she would hurt her friend as she liked Yuuji too Kozue kept it a secret, eventually when Misaki finds out though she is hurt as a result. With everyone's help their friendship is mended, and she becomes okay with Kozue going out with Yuuji. Not long after Kozue tells him that she will study abroad after they graduate, promising Yuuji she will be back. Kozue returns four years after they both graduate with a-lot to talk about with Yuuji.

Rei Kisaragi (如月 玲, Kisaragi Rei)
Voiced by: Sakura Takatsuki
Rei is a third year student and Yuuji's senpai. She is the leader of a school club run by Misaki, and enjoys mahjong.

Misato Souya (宗谷美里, Misato)
Voiced by: Yuuran Ryou
Misato is Misaki's older sister and Yuuji's history teacher. She's a fan of the Bakumatsu period and of Hijikata Toshizou.

Takeaki Tachibana (たちばな たけあき, Tachibana Takeaki)
Voiced by: Karadata
Takeaki is Yuuji's uncle, and Saki's father, he has black hair and brown eyes. Takeaki likes to make jokes, and has been deemed as un-natural by Yuuji. Despite this, Takeaki has shown that he deeply cares for his nephew and wants what is best for him. It is revealed that Takeaki along with Yuuji's father had wild childhoods.

Sumiyoshi Ito (いとう すみよし, Ito Sumiyoshi)
Voiced by: Hamada HiroHisashi
Yuji's best friend he has brown hair and brown eyes. Sumiyoshi has a perverted mind often suggesting lewd things jokingly, but offers Yuji support when it comes to romance as well as good advice. At one point he develops a cronoush on Misato but when he confesses his love she turns him down due to the barriers that separate them. His mom runs an okonomiyaki shop which is also his residence.

Kuraki (くらき, Kuraki)
Voiced by: Chunhua Kawai
Kuraki is a "pocket sized" snow fairy, she has blue hair with a bell tied into it. Yuuji first encounters her sleeping in the snow when clearing icicles from the inn. Kuraki is a bonus character in the series, and a short story is uncovered when the player finishes all five of the girl's storylines. In addition to being a character, Kuraki is also D.O's mascot appearing at the top right of the homepage.

== Reception ==
Trushot Archer from visual novel cake gave the novel a score of eight out of ten.
