= List of characters of Thunderbolt Fantasy =

Thunderbolt Fantasy is a Japanese-Taiwanese glove puppetry written by Gen Urobuchi and a collaboration work between Pili International Multimedia, Nitroplus, and Good Smile Company. Its first airing was in 2016. This list includes characters that appear in the work.

== Introduction ==
Japanese anime and Taiwanese glove puppetry have a noticeable and distinct visual style, which was described as a "key challenge" by production companies when they were collaborating. For example, in traditional puppetry shows, female characters have smaller eyes and sturdier arms, similar to their male counterparts. It contrasts with anime's traditional style, where female characters have larger eyes and thinner arms. Thunderbolt Fantasy, therefore, alter their character design to a more Japanese anime style. Mainly, there are four to five puppeteers in the work, arranged by their preference and proficiency in characters.

A key feature of traditional puppetry shows is that voice actors usually handle the characters' voice acting and kháu-pe̍h (an inner monologue and spoken dialogue) for each character in Taiwanese Hokkien. While each voice actor has developed their distinct voice acting style, audiences may struggle to accept actors from other voice actors, which affects their willingness to watch works. To address the issue, Pili use voice actors from Japan, letting them handle voice acting and kháu-pe̍h, and thus improving the audience's willingness to watch works from other actors.

Narrators of traditional puppetry often use a unique kháu-pe̍h in Taiwanese Hokkien when introducing main characters or calling their attacks, known as "introducing poem" (出場詩) or "poetic title" (詩號). They serve to highlight the character's personality, identity, state of mind, ambition, and the importance within the story. It is written in a classical style, with a format of five characters or seven characters in Classical Chinese. All Poetic titles in Thunderbolt Fantasy are spoken by Vincent Huang and his son Huei-Fung Huang (黃匯峰).

== Characters ==
Character names are presented in the format of Chinese Personal Name (Chinese Characters, Japanese Romanization, English Translation) / Chinese Art name (Chinese Characters, Japanese Romanization, English Translation). Chinese personal names and their Japanese romanisations are presented with the character's surname appearing first, followed by their given name.

=== Main characters ===
Shāng Bù Huàn (殤不患, Shō Fu Kan; Unconcerned with Dying Young) / Rèn Wú Fēng (刃無鋒, Jin Muhō; Edgeless Blade)
Principal puppeteer: Jia-Chang Hong, substitute puppeteer: Jia-Shen Liao
Voiced by: Junichi Suwabe (JP), Huei-Fung Huang (Taiwanese Min-Nan)
The main protagonist of this series, Shāng Bù Huàn is an enigmatic wandering swordsman. He appears to be cynical towards others, but is compassionate at heart. His inadvertent encounter with Lǐn Xuě Yā had him engulfed within the feud of the Xuán Guǐ Zōng pursuing Dān Fěi's crossguard of the Tiān Xíng Jiàn, and reluctantly joins the journey with Lǐn Xuě Yā and Dān Fěi to retrieve the hilt of the Tiān Xíng Jiàn. Hails from Xī Yōu. In season 2, he is pursued by villains from his past over his possession of the Mó Jiàn Mù Lù (魔剣目録, Maken Mokuroku; Sorcerous Sword Index), a scroll that contains many magical swords.
Lǐn Xuě Yā (凜雪鴉, Rin Setsu A; Austere Snow Crow) / Lüè Fēng Qiè Chén (掠風竊塵, Ryō Fū Setsujin; Thief of the Wind Dust (Note: "Enigmatic Gale" is Crunchyroll's translation.))
Principal puppeteer: Shen-En Wu (Note: Wu passed away in the middle of production due to a disease, therefore he performed his assigned characters only for the first couple of episodes.)
Voiced by: Kōsuke Toriumi (JP), Huei-Fung Huang (Min-Nan)
A major protagonist, also known under the alias as Guǐ Niǎo (鬼鳥, Kichō; Phantom Bird), Lǐn Xuě Yā is a beautiful young man filled with immense mystery. Erudite and adept at the art of strategy, he is shown to be graceful and composed. According to Shòu Yún Xiāo, Lǐn Xuě Yā has used several aliases to conceal his identity. He is considered a master manipulator and thief, and has even been called a villain.

=== Allies in Season 1 ===
Dān Fěi (丹翡, Tan Hi; Vermillion Kingfisher)
Principal puppeteer: Jia-Shen Liao
Voiced by: Mai Nakahara (JP), Wei-De Deng (Min-Nan)
One of the Seal Guardians hailing from the Sword Forging Shrine in charge of guarding the Tiān Xíng Jiàn, Dān Fěi takes pride in her heritage as a Seal Guardian, which makes her quite stubborn and tense when it comes to issues regarding the Tiān Xíng Jiàn, but she is also shown to be fairly naïve due to being inexperienced with the world outside of her shrine.
Dān Héng (丹衡, Tan Kō; Vermillion Balance)
Voiced by: Daisuke Hirakawa (JP), Huei-Fung Huang (Min-Nan)
The elder brother of Dān Fěi, he is also a Seal Guardian who guards the Tiān Xíng Jiàn along with his sister. Dān Héng is responsible for guarding the hilt of the Tiān Xíng Jiàn, while Dān Fěi protects the crossguard of the sword. Dān Héng lost his life at the hands of Miè Tiān Hái when the Xuán Guǐ Zōng invaded their shrine.
Shòu Yún Xiāo (狩雲霄, Shu Un Shō; Sky Hunter) / Ruì Yǎn Chuān Yáng (鋭眼穿楊, Ei Gan Sen Yō; Keen-eyed Sharpshooter (Note: "Sharp-Eyed Impaler" is Crunchyroll's translation.))
Voiced by: Rikiya Koyama (JP), Huei-Fung Huang (Min-Nan)
An old acquaintance of Lǐn Xuě Yā, Shòu Yún Xiāo is an archer who made a name for himself for his exceptional marksmanship. He regards Juǎn Cán Yún as his sworn younger brother. He joins the quest of retrieving the hilt of the Tiān Xíng Jiàn at Lǐn Xuě Yā's request.
Juǎn Cán Yún (捲殘雲, Ken San Un; To Furl Scattered Clouds) / Hán Hè (寒赫, Kan Kaku; Prominent Coldness (Note: "Frozen Wonder" in Crunchyroll's translation.))
Voiced by: Kenichi Suzumura (JP), Huei-Fung Huang (Min-Nan)
The sworn brother of Shòu Yún Xiāo, and a skilled spear wielder, Juǎn Cán Yún looks up to Shòu Yún Xiāo with admiration, and works hard to attain a reputation for himself using his skills. He tagged along with Yún Xiāo on the quest to retrieve the hilt of the Tiān Xíng Jiàn.
Xíng Hài (刑亥, Kei Gai; Final Punishment) / Qì Xiāo (泣宵, Kyū Shō; Weeping Night (Note: "Night's Lament" is Crunchyroll's translation.))
Principal puppeteer: Jia-Shen Liao
Voiced by: Sayaka Ohara (JP), Hsin-Ya Kuo (Min-Nan)
A powerful necromancer who dwells in the Night Devil Forest, and someone Lǐn Xuě Yā wishes to recruit to best the first obstacle of the Demon Spine Mountains. The other party members are wary of her because she is a demon, but Lǐn Xuě Yā assures them she can be trusted. Xíng Hài however is shown to be hostile towards Lǐn Xuě Yā for unknown reasons.
Shā Wú Shēng (殺無生, Setsu Mu Shō; Eradicator of Life) / Míng Fèng Jué Shā (鳴鳳決殺, Mei Hō Kessatsu; Screaming Phoenix Execution (Note: "Screaming Phoenix Killer" is Crunchyroll's translation.))
Voiced by: Nobuyuki Hiyama (JP), Huei-Fung Huang (Min-Nan)
A notorious and heartless killer, but also a swordsman whose skills are unparalleled. Due to some old enmity, he has set his eye on Lǐn Xuě Yā for revenge, and is obsessed with chasing Lǐn Xuě Yā down. When faced with a strong opponent, he cannot help but step forward in challenge. He thinks very highly of himself. Shā died after challenging Miè Tiān Hái to a duel.
Lián Qí (廉耆, Ren Ki; Honorable Sage)
Voiced by: Kazuhiro Yamaji (JP), Huei-Fung Huang (Min-Nan)
The mentor of Lǐn Xuě Yā and the original owner of the Soul Echo Flute, he also taught Lǐn Xuě Yā how to create magic items. He died by the blade of Shā Wú Shēng, who then took the Soul Echo Flute.

=== Antagonists in Season 1 ===
Miè Tiān Hái (蔑天骸, Betsu Ten Gai; Skeleton Who Scorns the Heavens) / Sēn Luó Kū Gǔ (森羅枯骨, Shinra Kokotsu; Mass Array of Dry Bones (Note: "Bones of Creation" in Crunchyroll's translation.))
Principal puppeteer: Jia-Shen Liao
Voiced by: Tomokazu Seki (JP), Huei-Fung Huang (Min-Nan)
Miè is a leader of the Xuán Guǐ Zōng, a group which utilizes the naturally defended mountain fortress, Seven Sins Tower, as its base of operations. He is arrogant and prideful, due to his skill with the sword, and possesses necromantic powers. He is also the foremost antagonist of the story. In order to seize the Tiān Xíng Jiàn protected by the Dān siblings, he uses every means possible to invade the Dān Family's sacred grounds.
Cán Xiōng (殘凶, Zan Kyō; Vicious)
Principal puppeteer: Jia-Shen Liao
Voiced by: Hiroki Yasumoto (JP), Huei-Fung Huang (Min-Nan)
Subordinate of Miè Tiān Hái, Cán is a Xuán Guǐ Zōng swordsman ordered to hunt down Dān Fěi. He died after confusing Shāng Bù Huàn with Dān Fěi due to the machinations of Lǐn Xuě Yā.
Liè Mèi (獵魅, Ryō Mi; Charming Huntress)
Principal puppeteer: Shen-En Wu
Voiced by: Haruka Tomatsu (JP), Hsin-Ya Kuo (Min-Nan)
Subordinate of Miè Tiān Hái, Liè Mèi ambushed Shāng Bù Huàn after he helped Dān Fěi escape, but was driven off by Shòu Yún Xiāo. She died after attacking Shā Wú Shēng.
Diāo Mìng (凋命, Chō Mei; Withered Life)
Voiced by: Tōru Ōkawa (JP), Huei-Fung Huang (Min-Nan)
Subordinate of Miè Tiān Hái, he is killed by Shāng Bù Huàn after trying to capture him along with Dān Fěi and Juǎn Cán Yún.

=== Allies in Season 2 ===
Làng Wū Yáo (浪巫謠, Rōfu Yō; Wandering Shaman Bard) / Xián Gē Duàn Xié (弦歌斷邪, Genka Danja; Song That Dooms Evil)
Voiced by: Takanori Nishikawa (JP)
First appearing in Thunderbolt Fantasy: The Sword of Life and Death, he is a mysterious, red-haired, young man who carries a demonic talking Pipa named Líng Yá (聆牙 (Ryouga, Listening Fang), voiced by Katsuyuki Konishi). He returns in Season 2 following his old acquaintance, Shāng Bù Huàn, after the latter left him in Xī Yōu. Làng was originally designed as a mascot for T.M. Revolution to promote the franchise, but Urobuchi grew fond of the character and later incorporated him in the franchise's main story. Làng Wū Yáo is the main character in the prequel film Thunderbolt Fantasy - Bewitching Melody of the West.

=== Antagonists in Season 2 ===
Xiào Kuáng Juàn (嘯狂狷, Shō Kyō Ken; Roaring Maniac (Note: This name is self-deprecating.)) / Zhuī Mìng Líng Hú (追命靈狐, Tsuimei Reiko; Hunting Fox)
Voiced by: Tarusuke Shingaki (JP), Huei-Fung Huang (Min-Nan)
A magistrate of Xī Yōu, he is tasked in finding Shāng Bù Huàn and retrieving the Sorcerous Sword Index. He is a cruel and cunning man who uses "justice" as a pretense to do villainous things.
Xiē Yīng Luò (蠍瓔珞, Katsueiraku; Scorpion Necklace) / Shí Xīn Dú Jī (蝕心毒姫, Shokushin Dokki; Princess of Cruelty)
Voiced by: Ayahi Takagaki (JP)
An assassin from the Order of The Divine Swarm, Xiē is sent to hunt down Shāng Bù Huàn and retrieve the Sorcerous Sword Index. She is a master of deception, dark magic and poisoning.
Huò Shì Míng Huáng (禍世螟蝗, Kasei Meikou; Plague of Moths and Locusts)
Voiced by: Shō Hayami (JP)
Xiē Yīng Luò's master, he is the leader of the Order of The Divine Swarm, an evil organization seeking the Sorcerous Sword Index. He is an incredibly powerful wizard that is skilled in dark magic.
Lóu Zhèn Jiè (婁震戒, Ro Shinkai; Shockwave) / Dì Kōng (諦空, Tei Kuu; Absolute Emptiness)
Voiced by: Akira Ishida (JP), Huang Zhen-Ji (Min-Nan)
Lóu is a nihilistic monk on a pilgrimage. When he encounters Xiē Yīng Luò, who threatens him with death, he questions her true motivations and goes as far as saving her from Shāng Bù Huàn and Làng Wū Yáo. Despite being a monk, Làng Wū Yáo has determined he is a character with evil intentions. His evil self is revealed when he takes the Seven Blasphemous Deaths and becomes its new master.
Qī Shā Tiān Líng (七殺天凌, Nanasatsu Tenryou; Seven Blasphemous Deaths)
Voiced by: Aoi Yūki (JP)
One of the weapons sealed within the Sorcerous Sword Index, it was released by Xiē Yīng Luò. Considered as one of the most dangerous weapons because of its malevolent sentience, it has the ability to control the wielder and when unsheathed, those who see the sword is drawn to it in madness. The sword also draws blood from any person it cuts or kills, further increasing its power as well as its wielder's.
Mò Wáng (歿王, Botsu Ou; Death King)
Voiced by: Kenta Miyake (JP)
A gigantic dragon living within the Wasteland of Spirits. His wing was sliced off by Shāng Bù Huàn when the latter encountered him on his journey to Dong Li. He is said to have killed and devoured his own kind to survive in the wastelands.

=== Bewitching Melody of The West ===
Mù Tiān Mìng (睦天命 Mutsu Tenmei, Destiny)
Voiced by: Nao Tōyama (JP)
Mù is Shāng Bù Huàn's partner in collecting swords across Xī Yōu and the first person to befriend Làng Wū Yáo. Like Wū Yáo, she is a musician who is also talented in the martial arts.
Zhòu Xún Yīn (咒旬瘖, Jū Shūn In, Mantra)
Voiced by: Kikuko Inoue (JP)
Làng Wū Yáo's mother who is blind, she is a former member of the Xī Yōu Imperial Court. Taking pride of her son's singing voice, she brutally trains him in singing and in combat until Wū Yáo fell ill. When Wū Yáo recovers, his pitch is changed, which sends Xún Yīn into a frenzy that led to her death by falling off a cliff.
Cháo Fēng (嘲風, Chou Fu, Derision)
Voiced by: Rie Kugimiya (JP)
Princess of Xī Yōu, she is cruel in that she has musicians perform for her while being attacked by her soldiers as part of her entertainment. After seeing Làng Wū Yáo's performance, he is made court virtuoso and is declared as her 'songstress' for life. She is enraged when Wū Yáo left to pursue Shāng Bù Huàn and Mù Tiān Mìng and later joining them.
Tiān Gōng Guǐ Jiàng (天工詭匠, Tenkokishou, Heavenly Crafter)
Voiced by: Kentarō Tone (JP)
An accomplice of Shāng Bù Huàn and Mù Tiān Mìng, he is the creator of the Sorcerous Sword Index.

=== Season 3 ===
Wā̀n Jūn Pò (萬軍破 Ban Gun Ha, Myriad Army Defeats) / Bǎi Jī Chéng Yì (百撃成義 Hyakugeki Seigi, Paragon of a Hundred Battles)
Voiced by: Akio Ōtsuka (JP)
Former comrade of Shāng Bù Huàn, he joined the Order of The Divine Swarm in hopes of overthrowing the current government and establishing a new world order, with Huò Shì Míng Huáng as its ruler. He also works undercover as one of Xī Yōu's highest-ranked officers.
Yì Piāomiǎo (異飄渺 I Hyou Byou, Beyond Indistinct) / Shuǐ Yuè Dāo Lang (水月刀螂 Suigetsu Tōrō, Crescent-Bladed Mantis)
Voiced by: Natsuki Hanae (JP)
A member of the Order of The Divine Swarm, he, along with Wā̀n Jūn Pò, is assigned by Huò Shì Míng Huáng to assist Xíng Hài as part of the alliance between the Order and the Demon Realm.
Guǐ Duó Tiān Gōng (鬼奪天工 Ki Datsu Ten Kou, Ghost Seizing Heavenly Crafter)
Voices by: Yōji Ueda (JP)
A wizard of Xī Yōu, he wishes to open the portal to the Demon Realm to learn and harness its secrets. He is responsible for building a weaponized prosthetic arm for Lóu Zhèn Jiè.
Zhào Jūn Lín (照君臨 Shou Kun Rin, Shining Reign)
Voices by: Aoi Yūki (JP)
Xíng Hài's elder sister, she is a demon sorceress who infiltrated Xī Yōu's royal court 200 years ago and caused its corruption by seducing its first Emperor to be a bloodthirsty tyrant - a trait that has since been passed down to his successors. After she was killed, she transferred her soul into the holy blade that fatally stabbed her, thus becoming the Seven Blasphemous Deaths.
Azibělpher (阿爾貝盧法 Ajiberufa)
Voices by: Shin-ichiro Miki (JP)
A count in the Demon Realm with powers over time and space, he is said to be extremely cruel and have visited the human realm several times despite the Demon Lord's orders. He is later revealed to be Làng Wū Yáo's father.

Bái Lián (白蓮 Byakuren, White Lotus)

Voices by: Takehito Koyasu (JP)
A mysterious man from a foreign realm and the originator of the magic swords (the Shén Huì Mó Xiè) during the War of the Fading Dusk, he is remembered in history as a god, despite being a mortal man. He is an based on Su Huan-Jen, a major character from Pili's other works.

=== Characters in Season 4 ===
Bà Wáng Yù (霸王玉 Ha Ou Gyoku, Tyrant Jade)

Voiced by: Fairouz Ai (JP)
A high ranking member of the Order of The Divine Swarm representing the Wasp, she is an extremely muscular warrior who favors brute strength above all else. Due to her lack of femineity, she is shunned by society and thus joins the Order.

Huā Wú Zōng (花無蹤 Ka Mu Shou, Flower without a Trace)

Voiced by: Shōgo Batori (JP)
A high ranking member of the Order of The Divine Swarm representing the Spider, he is a former thief who discovered Huò Shì Míng Huáng's identity as the emperor of Xī Yōu and given a high ranking position in the order for his talents. He is extremely arrogant and does not get along with Bà Wáng Yù.

Yàn Xī (晏熙 Anki)

Voiced by: Tomokazu Sugita (JP)
The younger brother of Dōng Li's emperor. He is an easygoing man who is enamored by the Hù Yìn Shī on a superficial level, but does not appreciate the vital importance of their roles.

Liè Mó Xián (裂魔弦 Retsu Magen, Splitting Demon String)

Voiced by: Katsuyuki Konishi (JP)
Líng Yá's humanoid form, which he takes on after being empowered by the demon realm. He is able to shoot wires out of his fingers similar to a pipa's strings.

=== Demon nobles ===
Demon society is organized in a hierarchical manner, ruled by seven nobles and the demon lord. Azibělpher is the lowest ranking of the demon court. Demon Lord

Voiced by: Yuichiro Umehara (JP)
The ruler of the demon realm. Following the War of the Fading Dusk, he enforced a decree of peace on the demon realm, much to the dissatisfaction of many nobles.

Kyuchirian (休德里安 Kyuchirian)

Voiced by: Kenji Nojima (JP)
Ranked second in the demon court. He is content with the peace ordered by the demon lord and serves as an executioner for him.

Fujirai (芙爾雷伊 Fujirai)

Voiced by: Risa Shimizu (JP)
Ranked third in the demon court. Like Kyuchirian, she is content with the peaceful state of the demon realm.

Ansatt (安索亞特 Ansaato)

Voiced by: Kazuyuki Okitsu (JP)
Ranked fourth in the demon court. He is skilled in the manipulation of dreams. He is rivals with Azibělpher.

Uraina (烏蕾娜 Uraina)

Voiced by: Noriko Shitaya (JP)
Ranked fifth in the demon court. She is rivals with Hailasu.

Hailasu (佩雷斯 Hairāsu)

Voiced by: Anri Katsu (JP)
Ranked sixth in the demon court. He is rivals with Uraina.

Kyarei (迦麗 Kyarei)

Voiced by: Akeno Watanabe (JP)
Ranked seventh in the demon court. She is a thrill seeker that hunts the vicious Hàn Jiǎo to satiate her boredom.

=== Other characters ===
Narration
Voiced by: Atsuko Tanaka (JP), Huei-Fung Huang (Min-Nan)
Tiě Dí Xiān (鐵笛仙, Tekkisen; Iron Flute Immortal)
Voiced by: Isshin Chiba (JP), Huei-Fung Huang (Min-Nan)
A character from the first half of Thunderbolt Fantasy: The Sword of Life and Death. Instructor of Shā Wú Shēng, he adopted Shā, who was abandoned by his birth father in front of Tiě Dí Xiān's dojo as an infant. He was the many times consecutive champion of the Sword Skill Competition and remained undefeated as the Sword Saint until Shā Wú Shēng killed him.
Luán Niángzi (孌娘子, Renjoshi; Lady Beautiful)
Character from Thunderbolt Fantasy Gaiden and a former friend of Xíng Hài, she spirited handsome young men away to her mansion in the mountains, where she lived a lustful lifestyle and, with the help of Xíng Hài, drank elixirs made from the blood of humans to retain her youthful looks over the years.
Bó Yáng Hóu (伯陽侯, Haku You Kou; Elder Sun Lord)
Voiced by: Shinnosuke Ogami (JP)
A Seal Guardian from Season 2 who heads Xiān Zhèn Fortress, which houses and protects various magical weapons, Shāng Bù Huàn approached him for assistance in protecting the Sorcerous Sword Index until the fortress came under attack by first Xiē Yīng Luò, and later by Lóu Zhèn Jiè.
Fake Shāng Bù Huàn
Voiced by: Satoshi Tsuruoka (JP)
A character from the second half of Thunderbolt Fantasy: The Sword of Life and Death. A portly man claiming to be Shāng Bù Huàn gives a humorous retelling of the events of Season 1. Later revealed to have been a former member of the Xuán Guǐ Zōng.
