= Mad =

Mad, mad, MAD or M. A. D. may refer to:

== Geography ==
- Mad (village), a village in the Dunajská Streda District of Slovakia
- Mád, a village in Hungary
- Adolfo Suárez Madrid–Barajas Airport, by IATA airport code
- Mad River (disambiguation), several rivers

== Music ==
- MAD Solutions, a Nigerian music distribution company

=== Bands ===
- M.A.D (band), British boyband from London, England
- M.A.D. (punk band), American hardcore punk band from Santa Cruz, California; later known as Blast
- Meg and Dia, American indie rock band from Draper, Utah

=== Albums ===
- Mad (Got7 EP), 2015
- Mad (Hadouken! EP), 2009
- Mad (Raven EP), 1986
- Mad!, album by Sparks, 2025

=== Songs ===
- "Mad" (song), by Ne-Yo, 2008
- "Mad", by Cassie Steele, 2014
- "Mad", by Dave Dudley from Talk of the Town, 1964
- "Mad", by Harpers Bizarre from Secret Life of Harpers Bizarre, 1968
- "Mad", by Isyana Sarasvati from Paradox, 2017
- "Mad", by The Lemonheads from Lick, 1989
- "Mad", by Magnetic Man from Magnetic Man, 2010
- "Mad", by Renee Rapp from Bite Me, 2025
- "M・A・D", by Buck-Tick from Kurutta Taiyou, 1991

== Organizations ==
- MAD Studio, an architectural firm
- Mad Computers, defunct American computer company
- MAD Solutions, a Nigerian music distribution company
- MAD Solutions, a sales and distribution agent, founder/supporter of the Arab Cinema Center in Egypt
- Make A Difference, an Indian NGO
- Mamamayan Ayaw sa Droga, a Filipino anti-drug addiction party-list group
- Might and Delight, a Swedish video game development studio
- Militärischer Abschirmdienst, German military counterintelligence agency

=== Museums ===
- Museum of Arts and Design, New York City, US
- Mechanical Art and Design museum, in Stratford-upon-Avon
- Musée des Arts Décoratifs, Paris

== Science and technology ==
- MAD (programming language), for Michigan Algorithm Decoder
- MAD, a protein encoded by the MXD1 gene
- Magnetic anomaly detector, detects variations in Earth's magnetic field
- Maritime anomaly detection in Global Maritime Situational Awareness, for avoiding maritime collisions
- Mathematicians of the African Diaspora, a website
- Methodical Accelerator Design, a CERN scripting language
- Modified Atkins diet
- Model Autophagy Disorder, a variant of model collapse, the gradual degradation in the output of a generative artificial intelligence model trained on synthetic data intelligence
- Mothers against decapentaplegic, a protein
- MPEG Audio Decoder, software
- Multi-conjugate Adaptive optics Demonstrator, an astronomical instrument
- Multi-wavelength anomalous dispersion, an X-ray crystallography technique
- Mitral annular disjunction, a structural abnormality of the heart

== Statistics ==
- Maximum absolute deviation, a statistical measure of variability
- Mean absolute difference, a measure of statistical dispersion
- Mean absolute deviation, a measure of the variability of quantitative data
- Median absolute deviation, a statistical measure of variability

== Television and video ==
- Mad TV, a 1995–2009 US series
- The Mad, a 2007 Canadian horror/comedy film
- Mad (TV series), 2010–2013, on Cartoon Network
- MAD TV (TV channel), a music channel
- M.A.D. (Indian TV programme), 2005–2010, children's educational programme
- M.A.D., organization in Inspector Gadget
- "M.A.D." (Veronica Mars), a 2005 episode

== Codes ==
- Madagascar, IOC country code (MAD)
- Moroccan dirham, the currency of Morocco by ISO 4217 currency code (MAD)
- mad, the ISO 639-2 code for the Madurese language

== Other uses ==
=== Mad ===
- Mad (magazine), an American humor magazine
- Mad (manga), a post-apocalyptic manga series written by Yusuke Otori
- Mad, a term for insanity used chiefly in British English
- Mad, a term for anger used chiefly in US English

=== MAD ===
- Mandibuloacral dysplasia, a rare syndrome found in humans
- Mary Andrews Denison (1826–1911) American author, who wrote under these initials
- Mutual assured destruction, nuclear warfare deterrence concept

== See also ==
- MADD (disambiguation)
- Mad TV (disambiguation)
- Rabies, (Latin rabies for "madness")
- Mad, a variant of the Hindi-Urdu word for alcohol, madhu
- Madness (disambiguation)
- List of people known as the Mad
