= Madness =

Madness or The Madness may refer to:

== Emotion and mental illness ==
- Insanity, a spectrum of behaviors characterized by certain abnormal mental or behavioral patterns
- Mental disorder, a diagnosis of a behavioral or mental pattern that may cause suffering or poor ability to function
- Anger, an intense emotional response to a perceived provocation, hurt or threat

== Art, religion, and philosophy ==
- Madness, the English name of the goddess of insanity in Euripides' tragedy Herakles
- Divine madness, idiosyncratic behavior linked to sacred pursuits
  - Divine inspiration and Plato's manias, four forms of divine madness (prophetic, cathartic, poetic–musical, erotic) treated in the Phaedrus dialogue

== Films and television series ==
- Madness (1919 film), a German horror film directed by Conrad Veidt
- Madness (1980 film), an Italian crime-drama film directed by Fernando Di Leo
- Madness (1992 film), an Italian giallo film directed by Bruno Mattei
- Madness (2010 film), a Swedish horror film
- "Madness" (Dynasty), a 1983 television episode
- The Madness (TV series), an American conspiracy thriller series

== Music ==
=== Musicians ===
- Madness (band), a British ska/pop band formed in 1976
  - The Madness (band), a 1987–1988 incarnation of Madness

=== Albums ===
- Madness (All That Remains album) or the title song, 2017
- Madness (Guy Sebastian album) or the title song, 2014
- Madness (Madness album), 1983
- Madness (Sleeping with Sirens album) or the title song, 2015
- Madness (Tony MacAlpine album), 1993
- Madness, by Sarah McLeod, 2010
- The Madness (Art of Anarchy album) or the title song, 2017
- The Madness (The Madness album), 1988

=== Songs ===
- "Madness" (Elton John song), 1978
- "Madness" (Ivi Adamou song), 2012
- "Madness" (Muse song), 2012
- "Madness (Is All in the Mind)", by Madness, 1983 (for the Prince Buster song recorded by Madness in 1979, see below)
- "Madness", by Alanis Morissette from Flavors of Entanglement, 2008
- "Madness", by Cascada, 2014
- "Madness", by Battle Beast from Unholy Savior, 2015
- "Madness", by KSI from All Over the Place, 2021
- "Madness", by Mist, 2016
- "Madness", by Moka Only and Sunspot Jonz from the 2000 album Road Life
- "Madness", by Prince Buster from I Feel the Spirit, 1963
- "Madness", by the Rasmus from Into, 2001

== Other uses ==
- Madness (Magic: The Gathering), a keyword in the trading card game Magic: The Gathering
- Madness (manga), a 2004 Japanese yaoi and adventure manga series by Kairi Shimotsuki
- MADNESS (Multiresolution Adaptive Numerical Environment for Scientific Simulation), a software environment for numerical simulation
- Madness: Race and Insanity in a Jim Crow Asylum, a 2024 book by Antonia Hylton
- Michigan Madness, a defunct soccer club based in Ann Arbor, Michigan, US

== See also ==
- Mad (disambiguation)
- Descent into Madness (disambiguation)
- Mad Studies
- Mario Madness
