= Pili Fantasy: War of Dragons =

Taiwanese television series

- Traditional Chinese: 刀說異數
- Simplified Chinese: 刀说异数
- Hanyu Pinyin: Dāo Shuō Yì Shù
- Genre: Glove puppetry Drama; Wuxia
- Written by: Huang Chiang-hua
- Opening theme: 紅塵笑 by Lee Chien-na 驚雷 by Tzu Tsung
- Ending theme: 咫尺天涯 by Lai Fu-cheng
- Country of origin: Taiwan
- Original languages: Taiwanese Hokkien; Chinese
- No. of seasons: 2
- No. of episodes: 30

Production
- Running time: 45 minutes
- Production company: Pili International Multimedia
- Budget: NT$250,000,000

Original release
- Release: 23 January 2019

Related
- Doom of Dragons

Pili Fantasy: War of Dragons (traditional Chinese: 刀說異數; simplified Chinese: 刀说异数) is the 2019 remake of the sixth season of Pili. The show features both Hokkien and Mandarin dubs, and is a rare example of women voicing female characters in Hokkien in Taiwanese glove puppetry show. A second Hokkien dub was released in May 2020. The Mandarin dub was done by TrioPen studio.

A second installment called Pili Fantasy: Doom of Dragons (traditional Chinese: 蝶龍之亂; simplified Chinese: 蝶龙之乱) was released on August 19, 2020, with Hokkien dubs from the second casting.

== Synopsis ==
The evil Dragon Spirit of the Great Underworld was defeated by Dragon God Suiku. Although the evil dragon survived in spirit form, the protection of Dragon God in the Martial World prevented him from terrorizing humans, until Mo Chi-yan of Fire Dragon's Tongue killed Suiku by accident, allowing the Dragon Spirit to summon the Eight Wonders to assist him in his revival. The evil Dragon Spirit also appeared before Kuan Tsu-tien, Golden Sun Emperor of the Northern District, instigating an invasion of the Martial World. Only the Eight Generals of Heavenly Tiger can stop the Dragon Spirit and his Wonders.

== Production ==
The 1990 Pili season was the season in which long-time popular characters Su Huan-chen, Yeh Hsiao-chai, and Yi Ye-Shu, a.k.a. the "Three Pillars of Pili" (霹靂三台柱), were first introduced in a united front, and was considered an initiation point for first time viewers of the puppetry series. The remake was initially planned to span 43 episodes, with a budget of NT$6 million (equivalent to US$300,000 in 2025) allocated to each episode, to a total of NT$250 million, higher than the average Taiwanese TV production budget of NT$1.3 to 2.0 million per episode.

Due to its high production cost, in contrast to the Pili series that ran continuously from 1984 to the present, the remake was released in separate installments, with the first installment War of Dragons (20 episodes) released on Jan 23, 2019, and the second part Doom of Dragons releasing its first 10 episodes after a one-year gap on August 19, 2020. The remaining episodes of Doom of Dragons are yet to be released as of April 2022, with COVID-19 pandemic speculated to have played a part in its delay.

== Release ==
Each episode of War of Dragons were pre-screened in four VIESHOW Cinemas across Taiwan 24 hours before DVDs were released on sale through convenience stores. The show was also simulcast on Pili App, CHT MOD, Taiwan Mobile myVideo, and Far EasTone friDay. War of Dragons was licensed by Netflix and released with multi-language subtitles on July 12, 2019.

== Reception ==
War of Dragons was criticized for its chaotic pacing despite initial promotions as a newcomer friendly entry to the Pili universe. The first dubbing was especially poorly received by fans of the traditional one-person glove puppetry voice acting by Huang Wen-tse. As a result of the voice acting criticisms, a "New Dub" version was released exclusively on Pili's streaming platform and TV channel.

The second installment Doom of Dragons was much warmer received, with Taiwanese critic Vinegar Film Cafe praising the show for its more contemporary take on the Pili universe, streamlined pacing, and improved performance from the New Dub cast.

== Media ==
=== Soundtrack ===
Pili Fantasy: War of Dragons Original Soundtrack

Soundtrack album
- Released: May 24, 2019
- Length: 148:16
- Language: Mandarin Chinese; Taiwanese Hokkien
- Label: Dapili International Marketing
- Producer: Pili International Multimedia

Pili Fantasy: War of Dragons Original Soundtrack (霹靂英雄戰紀之刀說異數 劇集原聲帶) was released on May 24, 2019. It contains a total of 40 tracks divided into two CDs, more than half of which are themes dedicated to major characters.

CD1
| No. | Title | Lyrics | Music | Singers | Length |
|---|---|---|---|---|---|
| 1. | "驚雷" (Mandarin Opening song) | Liao Ming-chih | Ting Tien-mu | Tzu Tsung | 3:45 |
| 2. | "冥海龍靈" | | Ting Tien-mu | | 3:29 |
| 3. | "日耀紫華" | | Feng Tsai-lun | | 4:19 |
| 4. | "一葉知秋" | | Huang Chien-chin | | 3:29 |
| 5. | "二十四番" | | Chang Wei-fan | | 4:00 |
| 6. | "羅網乾坤" | | Chia Ai-kuo | | 3:45 |
| 7. | "無心無劍" | | Chang Wei-fan, Jan Sanejko | | 3:22 |
| 8. | "冷劍白狐" | | Chia Ai-kuo | | 3:12 |
| 9. | "吞納玄黃" | | Ting Tien-mu | | 3:03 |
| 10. | "聖魔刀會" | | Chang Wei-fan | | 3:31 |
| 11. | "嘻遊江湖" | | Ting Tien-mu | | 3:05 |
| 12. | "金少爺" | | Tsai Chia-ying, Feng Tsai-lun | | 2:57 |
| 13. | "金陽聖帝" | | Huang Chien-chin | | 3:08 |
| 14. | "八面狼姬" | | Feng Tsai-lun | | 4:05 |
| 15. | "魔域" | | Sun Ching-fan | | 3:52 |
| 16. | "矩墨由我" | | Chang Wei-fan | Cheng Hung-li | 6:32 |
| 17. | "靈心異佛" | | Sun Ching-fan | | 4:49 |
| 18. | "枯葉" | | Tsai Chia-ying, Feng Tsai-lun | | 4:17 |
| 19. | "一劍萬生" | | Ting Tien-mu | | 3:01 |
| 20. | "紅塵笑" (Hokkien Opening Song) | Hsiao Yu-hsun | Ting Tien-mu | Lee Chien-na | 3:43 |
| Total length: | | | | | 75:24 |

CD2
| No. | Title | Lyrics | Music | Singers | Length |
|---|---|---|---|---|---|
| 1. | "蒼龍一吼破雲關" | | Huang Chien-chin | | 3:03 |
| 2. | "琉璃仙境" | | Chang Wei-fan, Tang Ti-hsin | | 3:31 |
| 3. | "聖龍白蓮" | | Feng Tsai-lun | | 4:06 |
| 4. | "風輪火轉" | | Ting Tien-mu | | 3:39 |
| 5. | "致命逼殺" | | Chia Ai-kuo | | 3:12 |
| 6. | "不夜天" | | Chia Ai-kuo | | 3:45 |
| 7. | "風采鈴" | | Ting Tien-mu | | 3:05 |
| 8. | "仇殺千里" | | Feng Tsai-lun | | 3:18 |
| 9. | "魔因神話" | | Ting Tien-mu | | 3:23 |
| 10. | "燈蝶" | | Chang Wei-fan, Tang Ti-hsin | | 3:39 |
| 11. | "危機之戰" | | Chang Wei-fan | | 3:19 |
| 12. | "累世罪業" | | Feng Tsai-lun | | 4:31 |
| 13. | "挽秋居" | | Feng Tsai-lun | | 4:43 |
| 14. | "天魔祭典" | | Ting Tien-mu | | 3:01 |
| 15. | "刀獸劍禽" | | Ting Tien-mu | | 3:42 |
| 16. | "蓮華聖路開天光" | | Feng Tsai-lun | | 3:43 |
| 17. | "百世經綸" | | Feng Tsai-lun | | 4:15 |
| 18. | "寰宇武典" | | Huang Chien-chin | | 3:03 |
| 19. | "英雄赴戰" | | Chia Ai-kuo | | 3:34 |
| 20. | "咫尺天涯" (Hokkien Ending Song) | Chien Chi-hsiu | Cai Chia-ying, Feng Tsai-lun | Lai Fu-cheng | 4:19 |
| Total length: | | | | | 72:52 |

=== Manga ===
Three manga adaptations that expanded the stories behind War of Dragon's characters were released digitally on Dragon Youth Comic magazine by Tong Li Publishing. All three adaptations were later published in limited tankōbon format.

==== Pili Fantasy: Pili Devil Eyes ====
Following a one-shot webmanga featuring Yeh Hsiao-chai and Pan To-fei, Tong Li Publishing published a spin-off manga adaptation based on the Pili Fantasy continuity by the one-shot artist T.K Chang Shih-Hsin. The story takes place before the events of War of Dragons, and focuses on a completely new character called Flying Snow (飛雪), whose family is wiped out by unknown assailants. In her quest for revenge, she crosses paths with various characters from War of Dragons, especially Yeh Hsiao-chai. The manga was nominated for the 11th Golden Comic Awards.

| No. | Release date | ISBN |
|---|---|---|
| 1 | August 7, 2019 | 978-9572638293 |
| 2 | September 7, 2020 | 978-9572656884 |

==== Pili Fantasy: Luó Wǎng Qián Kūn ====
The second spin-off manga by mangaka duo Ya Shen features Chi Lu-jen's backstory. The name is based on Chi Lu-jen's title Master Illusionist (Chinese: 羅網乾坤; pinyin: Luó Wǎng Qián Kūn).

| No. | Release date | ISBN |
|---|---|---|
| 1 | February 3, 2020 | 978-9572647103 |
| 2 | November 13, 2020 | 978-9572658277 |

==== Pili Fantasy: Huā Yǔ Hú ====
The third manga adaptation, drawn by the artist D2 in the yaoi style, retells the events of War of Dragons and Doom of Dragons from Hua Hsin-Feng and Leng Chien Pai-hu's perspectives.

| No. | Release date | ISBN |
|---|---|---|
| 1 | August 13, 2021 | 978-9572675441 |
