= Legend of the Sacred Stone =

The Legend of the Sacred Stone
- Japanese theatrical release poster
- Chinese: 聖石傳說
- Hanyu Pinyin: Shèng Shí Chuán Shuō
- Directed by: Huang Chiang-hua (黃強華)
- Written by: Huang Chiang-hua (黃強華)
- Produced by: Huang Wen-tse (黃文擇) Liu Li-hui (劉麗惠)、Tsai Jung-chuan (蔡融涓)
- Cinematography: Tsai Meng-yu (蔡孟育)
- Edited by: Hsiao Ju-kuan (蕭汝冠)
- Music by: Shanghai Symphony Orchestra (上海交響樂團)
- Production company: Pili International Multimedia (霹靂國際多媒體)
- Distributed by: Deltamac (得利影視)（Taiwan）
- Release dates: January 22, 2000 (Taiwan); September 20, 2001 (China)
- Running time: 96 minutes(Theatrical release); 120 minutes(Extended DVD release)
- Country: Taiwan
- Languages: Taiwanese Hokkien; Mandarin Chinese
- Budget: NT$300 million
- Box office: NT$150 million

The Legend of the Sacred Stone (聖石傳說) is a 2000 Taiwanese glove puppetry feature film written and directed by Huang Chiang-hua (黃強華). A spin-off from the Pili television series, it reflects the traditional Taiwanese style of glove puppetry known as budaixi, supplemented with computer-generated imagery.

With a budget of NT$300 million and three years of production time, it was a major innovation for the glove puppetry genre and marked a milestone in its cinematic development. The film pioneered cross-industry promotional strategies and became the first Taiwanese film to premiere simultaneously in all five major cinema chains across the island. Its opening week box office of NT$28 million surpassed Toy Story 2. However, despite eventually becoming the first local film to gross over NT$100 million, it was considered a box-office bomb, earning only NT$150 million against its NT$300 million budget. It was soon surpassed by Crouching Tiger, Hidden Dragon (2000).

== Synopsis ==
The story is set 400 years in the past, when the martial world (wulin) is threatened by Mo Kuei, who seeks to destroy it. The sage Su Huan-jen responds by summoning three martial warriors to aid him. As Lord Jian lusts after the Sacred Stone to restore his lost power, conflicts erupt between the forces of good and evil. The central conflict revolves around the "Heavenly Question Stone" (天問石), a meteorite capable of granting any wish, sparking battles across the martial world.

In addition to sets at the Pili studios in Huwei, Yunlin County, filming also took place at the Huwei River, Kenting, and Lugu Township. The puppets were redesigned for cinematic needs, resulting in more realistic and expressive performances.

== Characters ==
- Su Huan-jen (素還真): Protagonist, known as "White Lotus" for his purity of mind. A one-armed martial sage and swordsman, calm, wise, and tactically clever. Secretly in love with Jian Ru-bing. Vows to defeat Lord Jian after witnessing his brother’s death.
- Ao Hsiao-hong-chen (傲笑紅塵): Once Lord Jian’s friend, later devoted to justice and spiritual power. Stronger swordsman than Su Huan-jen, as shown in their duel. Often impulsive, but fights with a strong moral compass.
- Ching Yang-tzu (青陽子): Sworn brother of Su Huan-jen, gentlemanly and brave, skilled with a harp weapon channeling spiritual power. Mortally wounded while protecting Jian Ru-bing, he ensures her escape before dying in battle.
- Jian Ru-bing (劍如冰): Daughter of Lord Jian, torn between filial duty and her love for Su Huan-jen. Attempts to restore her father using the Sacred Stone, but ultimately sacrifices herself, as the stone requires an equal sacrifice for power.
- Lord Jian: Antagonist, once known as the "Great Protector." After demons destroyed his family and scarred his face, he was consumed by hatred. Obsessed with reclaiming his face and unlimited power via the Sacred Stone, even at the cost of his daughter’s life.
- Jian Wei: Lord Jian’s loyal protector since youth, wishing for Jian’s return to his former self. Ultimately killed by his master despite his loyalty when he tries to save Ru-bing.
- Other characters: Mo Kuei, Jian Wu-yan, Jian Jun, Kwuang Dao, Hsiao-chai, and various demons.

== Cast ==
Character	Taiwanese voice	Mandarin voice	Japanese voice	Notes
Su Huan-jen (素還真)	Huang Wen-tse (黃文擇)	Wang Wei-chung (王偉忠)	Takehito Koyasu (子安武人)	Martial sage, master swordsman
Ao Hsiao-hong-chen (傲笑紅塵)	Huang Wen-tse (黃文擇)	Jonathan Lee (李宗盛)	Shin-ichiro Miki (三木真一郎)	Swordsman with past grudges
Ching Yang-tzu (青陽子)	Huang Wen-tse (黃文擇)	Ko I-cheng (柯一正)	Tomokazu Seki (關智一)	Sworn brother of Su Huan-jen
Jian Ru-bing (劍如冰)	Huang Wen-tse (黃文擇)	Hsiao Chiung (蕭薔)	Tamao Satō (佐藤珠緒)	Daughter of Lord Jian
Jian Shang-ching / Mr. Bone (劍上卿／骨皮先生)	Huang Wen-tse (黃文擇)		Renji Ishibashi (石橋蓮司)	Father of Jian Ru-bing
Mo-kuei (魔魁)	Huang Wen-tse (黃文擇)			Villain
Yeh Hsiao-chai (葉小釵)	Huang Wen-tse (黃文擇)			Buddhist disciple
Luan-shih K’uang-tao (亂世狂刀)	Huang Wen-tse (黃文擇)			Taoist disciple
Chien Chun Shih-er-hen (劍君十二恨)	Huang Wen-tse (黃文擇)			Confucian disciple
Jian Wei (劍衛)	Huang Wen-tse (黃文擇)			Lord Jian’s protector
Jian Wu-yan (劍無言)	Huang Wen-tse (黃文擇)			Servant of Lord Jian

== Production ==
- Producers: Huang Chiang-hua (黃強華), Huang Wen-tse (黃文擇)
- Executive producers: Liu Li-hui (劉麗惠), Tsai Jung-chuan (蔡融涓)
- Visual director: Chen Jung-shu (陳榮樹)
- VFX: Taichi Audio & Video Technology Co. (太極影音科技公司)
- Music: Shanghai Symphony Orchestra (上海交響樂團)
- Cinematography: Tsai Meng-yu (蔡孟育)
- Editing: Hsiao Ju-kuan (蕭汝冠)
- Puppet styling and costumes by Ting Chen-ching (丁振清), Pan Yu-hsiang (潘宇祥), Yu Mei-chuan (余美娟), and others

== Technique ==
The film combines traditional glove puppetry, CG animation, and wire-assisted action sequences. Unlike other hand puppets, budaixi puppets have legs, enabling more lifelike choreography.

== DVD versions ==
- Taiwan: 120-minute uncut version, no English subtitles.
- Japan: 99-minute truncated version with English subtitles (advertised as "129 minutes" including special features).

== See also ==
- Glove puppetry films
- Pili (TV series)
