= List of Thunderbolt Fantasy episodes =

Thunderbolt Fantasy is a television series created and written by Nitroplus' Gen Urobuchi, who developed the script closely with Pili International Multimedia and Good Smile Company. The voices were originally performed in Min-Nan Chinese based on the translated Japanese script for the puppetry performance and broadcast in Taiwan. The episodes were then dubbed into Mandarin Chinese and Japanese for their respective regions' broadcast, with the Japanese version licensed to simulcast outside of Asia by Crunchyroll starting July 8, 2016.

The opening theme is "Raimei" performed by Takanori Nishikawa (T.M.Revolution). The second season premiered in October 2018. For the second season, the opening theme and the ending theme are "His/Story" and "Roll The Dice", respectively, both performed by Takanori Nishikawa. The third season premiered on April 3, 2021. It was set to premiere in 2020 but was delayed due to the COVID-19 pandemic. Takanori Nishikawa performed the opening theme song "Judgement" for the third season, and the ending theme is "thunderBOLTfantasy" by mpi.

Season 1 is about a sword called "天刑劍", while Season 2 surrounds the "Sorcerous Sword Index" (魔劍目錄). In Season 3, the story emphasises time travel and teleportation, and the Season 4 drive into Hell. The two theatre releases are side stories of Season 1 and Làng Wū Yáo, while the third release answered all foreshadowing in all seasons.

== Season 1 ==
No. in season	Title (Note: All English titles are taken from Crunchyroll.)	Original release date
1	"Code of Umbrellas" "Amagasa no Giri" (Japanese: 雨傘の義理)	July 8, 2016
One stormy night, Dān Fěi and her brother Dān Héng, protectors of the Tiān Xíng Jiàn, are pursued by the evil Xuán Guǐ Zōng clan. Although the clan's leader, Miè Tiān Hái, manages to kill Héng and retrieve the sword's hilt, Fěi manages to escape off a cliff. Meanwhile, a travelling swordsman named Shāng Bù Huàn comes across an umbrella covering a Buddha statue, where a peculiar man informs him that taking the umbrella will require him to do a good favor in return. As Bù Huàn returns on his journey, he encounters Fěi as she escapes from Xuán Guǐ Zōng members, prompting him to step in to protect her. After bringing Fěi back to the man he met earlier, Bù Huàn is confronted by the Xuán Guǐ Zōng's Cán Xiōng, who attacks Bù Huàn after the mysterious man sprays him with smoke making him believe he is actually Fěi. After Bù Huàn defeats him in battle, Xiōng severs his own head and sends it to Tiān Hái, who identifies the mysterious man as Lüè Fēng Qiè Chén.
2	"Attack of the Xuán Guǐ Zōng!" "Shūrai! Genkishu" (Japanese: 襲来! 玄鬼宗)	July 15, 2016
Fěi explains to Bù Huàn and the peculiar man, who calls himself Guǐ Niǎo, that the Xuán Guǐ Zōng need the crossguard she is carrying to draw the Tiān Xíng Jiàn from its sealed pedestal. Not wanting to get involved any further, Bù Huàn takes his leave and goes into a town, where he learns that the Xuán Guǐ Zōng have labelled him as an enemy. He leaves town, passing by a stranger who warns him of an ambush further down the road. Exactly like the man warned him, the Xuán Guǐ Zōng's Liè Mèi confronts Bù Huàn and her lackeys surround him. Just then, Bù Huàn is joined by a warrior named Juǎn Cán Yún, along with the stranger from earlier, Shòu Yún Xiāo, who defeat Mèi's soldiers and force her to retreat.
3	"The Woman in Night Devil Forest" "Yama no Mori no Onna" (Japanese: 夜魔の森の女)	July 22, 2016
Yún Xiāo and Cán Yún are revealed to be allies summoned by Guǐ Niǎo to join Fěi and a reluctant Bù Huàn as they journey to the Seven Sins Tower in the Demon Spine Mountains where the Xuán Guǐ Zōng dwell. Guǐ Niǎo explains that in order to get past the barrier surrounding the mountains and reach the tower, they must overcome three different obstacles, one of which requires the assistance of a demon necromancer named Xíng Hài, who resides in the Night Devil Forest. The next day, the group heads into the forest to seek out Hài, who believes them to be trespassers and attacks them with an army of zombies, which Fěi and Cán Yún fend off while the other three press forward.
4	"The Whereabouts of the Soul Echo Flute" "Kaireiteki no Yukue" (Japanese: 迴靈笛のゆくえ)	July 29, 2016
Guǐ Niǎo uses fire to draw Hài out of hiding, managing to persuade her to join his party after bringing up the Tiān Xíng Jiàn. Meanwhile, Lián Qí, Guǐ Niǎo's master who possesses the Soul Echo Flute needed to make it through the labyrinth leading to the Demon Spine Mountain, is attacked and killed by the Screaming Phoenix Killer, Shā Wú Shēng. He steals the flute and awaits Guǐ Niǎo's arrival. Wú Shēng tries to provoke Guǐ Niǎo into fighting, but he refuses to do so. Instead, Yún Xiāo and Cán Yún attempt to fight against Wú Shēng but are both easily outmatched, prompting Guǐ Niǎo to call a retreat.
5	"The Sword Devil, Shā Wú Shēng" "Kenki, Setsu Mu Shō" (Japanese: 剣鬼, 殺無生)	August 5, 2016
After the group returns to their inn, they talk about confronting the Screaming Phoenix Killer. Cán Yún is determined to fight Wú Shēng in a duel the next morning, because he considers himself expendable and because, if he wins, then he would make a name for himself. Xíng Hài offers her help in the form of spells. Guǐ Niǎo, however, feels that confrontation should only be used as a last resort. Bù Huàn gets tired of the talk and decides to head off on his own. He goes to the Devilwood Flower Garden himself and asks Wú Shēng to hand over the Soul Echo Flute. Wú Shēng refuses and they prepare to battle, but Guǐ Niǎo defuses the situation and asks Wú Shēng the favor of becoming the performer of the Soul Echo Flute; in exchange, Guǐ Niǎo propositions Wú Shēng his head once they have reached the summit of the Demon Spine Mountains. Wú Shēng agrees. Meanwhile, Miè Tiān Hái suspects that Guǐ Niǎo's group will head to him.
6	"Seven Comrades" "Nananin Dōshū" (Japanese: 七人同舟)	August 12, 2016
Bù Huàn is worried that the group cannot work together, as everyone is suspicious of each other, but he still accompanies them as they ride a boat to the Demon Spine Mountains. Upon arrival to shore, the group encounters the Xuán Guǐ Zōng, led by Liè Mèi and Diāo Mìng. Cán Yún is motivated by Wú Shēng to attack and takes care of the "cannon fodder", while Hài and Yún Xiāo work together to raise the dead created by Cán Yún. Wú Shēng finally attacks after all the soldiers have been taken care of, killing Liè Mèi. Suddenly, Miè Tiān Hái shows up.
7	"Demon Spine Mountains" "Masekizan" (Japanese: 魔脊山)	August 19, 2016
After Miè Tiān Hái shows up, he mocks the group then immediately leaves, along with the rest of the Xuán Guǐ Zōng. The group then arrives at the Demon Spine Mountains, and rest a night before heading in. Dān Fěi is up practicing, when Cán Yún shows up and gives her a few pointers, though angering her in the process. She storms off and the group enters the mountains the next day, encountering the Valley of the Dead, the first trial. Xíng Hài is called upon to put the dead to sleep, but fails a few times; Fěi protects the group with her Hù Yìn Shī skills, except for Bù Huàn who has to fight the dead. Hài finally succeeds in singing the correct tune and the group moves on, arriving at the second trial, the Valley of the Doll. A golem guardian stands there motionless, and Bù Huàn activates it, allowing Yún Xiāo to fire at its weak point. Yún Xiāo misses twice, though, so Bù Huàn takes matters into his own hands and climbs the golem, stabbing the charm himself and deactivating the golem. He then falls off, but is saved by Yún Xiāo's arrow, which pierces through his clothing and nails him to the arm of the now-deactivated golem. The group then moves onto the final trial, the Labyrinth of Darkness. Bù Huàn, however, declares his departure before they can continue.
8	"The Enigmatic Gale" "Ryō Fū Setsujin" (Japanese: 掠風竊塵)	August 26, 2016
After Bù Huàn storms off, Fěi admonishes the groups and runs after him. Guǐ Niǎo also follows her. The remaining four comrades decide to pass through the Labyrinth of Darkness using the Soul Echo Flute. Guǐ Niǎo and Fěi find Bù Huàn spying on some Xuán Guǐ Zōng soldiers, who are trying to catch more demon birds. The three of them ambush the Xuán Guǐ Zōng and use a bone-whistle to call the demon birds and ride them to the Seven Sins Tower. Once they arrive, they find Tiān Hái waiting for them. Fěi immediately attacks him, seeking vengeance for her brother and to obtain the hilt of the Tiān Xíng Jiàn, but Guǐ Niǎo sprays Fěi with smoke, causing her to attack Bù Huàn instead. Diāo Mìng then knocks out Fěi and arrests Bù Huàn. They are then thrown into cages, where they are found by the other four. Yún Xiāo reveals Guǐ Niǎo's other name, Enigmatic Gale (Lüè Fēng Qiè Chén), while Fěi reveals his real name, Lǐn Xuě Yā.
9	"The Essence of a Sword" "Ken no Shinzui" (Japanese: 剣の神髄)	September 2, 2016
Yún Xiāo and Xíng Hài reveal that their letters from Lǐn Xuě Yā asked them to swindle Fěi of her crossguard. Wú Shēng affirms this with the letter he stole from Xuě Yā's teacher, Lián Qí. Cán Yún is shaken up by this turn of events, but still follows the other three as they leave Bù Huàn and Fěi in their cells. Wú Shēng returns to the Tower, though, seeking Xuě Yā's head as promised. Meanwhile, Xuě Yā and Miè Tiān Hái are having a discussion about the Tiān Xíng Jiàn. Wú Shēng interrupts this discussion, though, and before going after Xuě Yā, challenges Tiān Hái to a duel. Tiān Hái slays Wú Shēng, and explains his swordsmanship to Xuě Yā. While this happens, Bù Huàn breaks out of his cell.
10	"A Thief's Pride" "Tōzoku no Kyōji" (Japanese: 盗賊の矜恃)	September 9, 2016
After Bù Huàn exits his cell, he sees Wú Shēng fighting through endless streams of Xuán Guǐ Zōng fodder. Bù Huàn picks up a sword from a dead soldier and continues searching the Seven Sins Tower for Lǐn Xuě Yā. He then spots Xuě Yā and Diāo Mìng, and hides. Bù Huàn confronts Xuě Yā after Diāo Mìng leaves. Xuě Yā then explains his plan to Bù Huàn, and explains that both Yún Xiāo and Xíng Hài are villains that would take the Tiān Xíng Jiàn for themselves. All Xuě Yā wants to do is make Miè Tiān Hái despair. Xuě Yā also reveals the hiding place of the crossguard—the Limitless Temple. Bù Huàn then meets with Fěi and tells her the plan and to stay in the cell. Meanwhile, Xuě Yā sets up a deal with Tiān Hái. Afterwards, Xuě Yā meets with Bù Huàn again and gives him a hood that changes his appearance to that of Xuě Yā. They then begin to carry out Xuě Yā's plan. At the same time, Cán Yún breaks Fěi out of her cell.
11	"A Proud Life" "Hokori Takaki Inochi" (Japanese: 誇り高き命)	September 16, 2016
Bù Huàn, disguised as Xuě Yā, meets with Tiān Hái, who becomes very suspicious, and together with the Xuán Guǐ Zōng, ride their demon birds to the Limitless Temple. As this happens, Xuě Yā discovers that Yún Xiāo and Xíng Hài also met with Tiān Hái. He then goes to unlock the safe containing the hilt of the Tiān Xíng Jiàn, transforming his pipe into chopsticks. Erstwhile, after Bù Huàn receives the gold agreed upon for the crossguard of the Tiān Xíng Jiàn, he is questioned by Tiān Hái and Diāo Mìng, who have already seen through his disguise. Bù Huàn then acts as bait to allow Xuě Yā to finish his part, but Tiān Hái had kept the hilt on him the entire time. Meanwhile, Cán Yún and Fěi also head to the Limitless Temple by way of a Spirit Tree. There, they find the crossguard before the others arrive. They were followed by Yún Xiāo and Hài, though, and are forced to fight. Yún Xiāo and Hài obtain the crossguard and force Cán Yún and Fěi to retreat. Xuě Yā, alone again, sets up a trap.
12	"A Blade That Doesn't Cut" "Kirezaru yaiba" (Japanese: 切れざる刃)	September 23, 2016
After escaping from the Xuán Guǐ Zōng, Bù Huàn happens upon Cán Yún and Fěi. He learns Yún Xiāo and Hài stole the crossguard and intend to sell it to Tiān Hái. Cán Yún also titles Bù Huàn the "Edgeless Sword". Suddenly, Diāo Mìng and the Xuán Guǐ Zōng show up and attack the three of them. Bù Huàn shows his true colors and fights with a wooden branch. After killing Diāo Mìng and the Xuán Guǐ Zōng, Bù Huàn explains his philosophy as the three of them head to the Duàn Jiàn Cí. Meanwhile, Yún Xiāo and Hài meet with Tiān Hái at the Duàn Jiàn Cí. After removing the sword from the pedestal, Yāo Tú Lí is revealed, the lost demon god. Hài then kills Yún Xiāo for trying to prevent the awakening of the demon god. Xuě Yā confronts Tiān Hái outside the Duàn Jiàn Cí after Hài leaves.
13	"A New Duty" "Aratanaru Shimei" (Japanese: 新たなる使命)	September 30, 2016
Xuě Yā duels Tiān Hái, with Xuě Yā crushing Tiān Hái's spirit. Because of this, Tiān Hái destroys the Tiān Xíng Jiàn, releasing Yāo Tú Lí from the binding. Bù Huàn, Cán Yún, and Fěi find Xuě Yā after this happens, and Bù Huàn decides to face Yāo Tú Lí. He defeats the demon god by channeling the power of one of the thirty-six swords he collected from his travels, and banishes the demon god to the far reaches of space, ending the threat once and for all. He leaves the sword in the care of Cán Yún and Fěi, and departs, but not before receiving a parting gift from Xuě Yā.

== Season 2 ==
No. overall	No. in season	Title	Original release date
14	1	"Xiān Zhèn Fortress" "Sen Jin Jō" (Japanese: 仙鎮城)	October 1, 2018
Shāng Bù Huàn enters the Xiān Zhèn Fortress to meet Bó Yáng Hóu to surrender the Sorcerous Sword Index and place it under the fortress's protection. Despite the letter of introduction by the Seal Guardian Dān Fěi, Bó Yáng Hóu was suspicious of Bù Huàn's intentions, but accepts the Index, nonetheless. Bù Huàn reunites with his old partner, Làng Wū Yáo and his talking Pipa Líng Yá, who informs Shāng that Huò Shì Míng Huáng has sent the assassin Xiē Yīng Luò to retrieve the Index. Bù Huàn hurriedly returns to the fortress as it falls under attack by Yīng Luò. With Wū Yáo's help, Bù Huàn managed to repel Xiē Yīng Luò, but not before ripping and taking a portion of the Index with her. Meanwhile, Xiào Kuáng Juàn, a magistrate of Xī Yōu, enters Dōng Li on official business to hunt down and capture Shāng Bù Huàn, now deemed a fugitive. Assisting him is Lǐn Xuě Yā, who poses as a Dōng Li inspector and assuming his alias as Guǐ Niǎo.
15	2	"The Stolen Sorcerous Blades" "Ubawareta maken" (Japanese: 奪われた魔剣)	October 8, 2018
Lǐn Xuě Yā & Xiào Kuáng Juàn visit the Xiān Zhèn Fortress to speak with Bó Yáng Hóu, who is recovering from the poison applied to him by Xiē Yīng Luò. Both Xuě Yā and Kuáng Juàn use the information to further incriminate Shāng Bù Huàn, citing he and Xiē are conspiring to steal the magical weapons from the fortress. Later, Yīng Luò attacks a town using The Night of Mourning – a sword from the Index that turns its victims into puppets for the wielder to control, and uses them to attack Bù Huàn and Làng Wū Yáo. Bù Huàn is then struck by Yīng Luò's poison and is then overwhelmed by her puppets.
16	3	"Princess of Cruelty" "Shokushin Dokki" (Japanese: 蝕心毒姫)	October 15, 2018
Bù Huàn and Wū Yáo flee from Yīng Luò, just before Xiào Kuáng Juàn enters the scene. Yīng Luò too, is forced to flee when Kuáng Juàn and his men show no remorse in killing the puppets. After finding a safe area, Bù Huàn tells Wū Yáo that the Seven Blasphemous Deaths was the second sword Yīng Luò has stolen. Neither Bù Huàn nor Wū Yáo can remove the poison from the former until Lǐn Xuě Yā arrives to meet them. Meanwhile, a monk by the name of Dì Kōng is summoned into Xiān Zhèn Fortress to help heal the ailing Bó Yáng Hóu. Kōng asks if there is a point to save an elderly person, and after hearing answers from the Seal Guardians, heals him.
17	4	"Close Foes" "Shinkin Tekijin" (Japanese: 親近敵人)	October 22, 2018
Xuě Yā and Wū Yáo travel to the Wasteland of Spirits (where the danger of the area has been reduced thanks to Bù Huàn's exploits), to retrieve the ingredients for the antidote for Bù Huàn's poison. Kuáng Juàn summons Yīng Luò and proposes a temporary alliance to hunt down Bù Huàn, to which Yīng Luò accepts. When Yīng Luò returns to her hideout, she encounters Dì Kōng and attacks him. Unconvinced of her reasons to kill him, Kōng easily avoids Yīng Luò's attacks and questions her true motivations before leaving.
18	5	"Hellfire Valley" "Gyōka no Tani" (Japanese: 業火の谷)	October 29, 2018
Xuě Yā and Wū Yáo proceed into Hellfire Valley, the domain of the dragon Mò Wáng, for the latter's horn needed for the antidote. The duo successfully defeats the dragon and obtain the horn, but Wū Yáo attacks Xuě Yā shortly after, citing Lǐn as an untrusting individual. Xuě Yā escapes and gives Wū Yáo the final instructions on preparing the antidote. Meanwhile, Xiē and Xiào are close to finding Bù Huàn's location. Due to the poison, Bù Huàn is unable to flee far enough and Yīng Luò and Kuáng Juàn caught up with him. Bù Huàn is forced to fight Kuáng Juàn's men until Wū Yáo arrives with the antidote.
19	6	"A Poisoner's Pride" "Dokushu no Hokori" (Japanese: 毒手の誇り)	November 5, 2018
Xiào Kuáng Juàn betrays Xiē Yīng Luò by taking the Night of Mourning for himself after she is defeated by the rejuvenated Shāng Bù Huàn, forcing her to flee. Lǐn Xuě Yā arrives and convinces Kuáng Juàn to retreat as well. Later, in their pursuit of Xiē, Bù Huàn and Làng Wū Yáo encounter Dì Kōng, who earlier rescued Yīng Luò and took her to her hideout to recover. Kōng questions Bù Huàn on seeking out Yīng Luò. Suspecting the monk is of an evil nature, Wū Yáo attacks Kōng, but was stopped by Bù Huàn. Kuáng Juàn inquires about the Enigmatic Gale, much to the shock of the Dōng Li lawman.
20	7	"Bewitched Whispering" "Yōki no Sasayaki" (Japanese: 妖姫の囁き)	November 12, 2018
At Yīng Luò's hideout, Kōng further questions her true motivations, including her loyalty to Huò Shì Míng Huáng, putting her in a state of doubt. In their secret meeting, Bù Huàn confirms to Xuě Yā that he is a fugitive for stealing all the mystic swords and placing them into the Sorcerous Sword Index, citing that the Xī Yōu government were using them in their campaign of conquest. Later, as Yīng Luò thinks of her next course of action, she is surrounded by Kuáng Juàn and his men. In desperation, she unsheathes the Seven Blasphemous Deaths, causing Kuáng Juàn and his men to fall into the sword's charms and fight each other. This vulnerability leaves them open for Yīng Luò to strike them down and for the sword to feed on their blood. Bù Huàn and Wū Yáo arrive to find themselves the latest target of Yīng Luò's newfound bloodlust.
21	8	"The Song That Dooms Evil" "Genka Danja" (Japanese: 弦歌斷邪)	November 19, 2018
Bù Huàn is badly wounded by Yīng Luò, but was ordered by the Seven Blasphemous Deaths to not kill him, instead make him suffer by killing more innocent victims by her blade. Yīng Luò leaves while Xuě Yā takes an exhausted Kuáng Juàn, unaware that the latter has discovered the former's true identity. Yīng Luò later attacks a town and kills many of the local populace, but was stopped by Wū Yáo, who found a way to counter the charms of the Seven Blasphemous Deaths. Kuáng Juàn and Xuě Yā, now working together, arrive to allow Yīng Luò to escape as part of Kuáng Juàn's plan to use her and the sword as a counter against Bù Huàn.
22	9	"The Path of the Strong" "Tsuwamono no Michi" (Japanese: 強者の道)	November 26, 2018
The Seven Blasphemous Deaths lambasts Yīng Luò for failing to defeat Wū Yáo, and orders her to offer her blood to the sword as punishment. Frustrated, Yīng Luò frees herself from the sword and leaves. As she wanders, she encounters Shāng Bù Huàn and the two engage in a duel, with Bù Huàn victorious. Bù Huàn spares her and tells her that one can also gain strength through defeat before leaving. Learning of this, Yīng Luò gains her resolve and is about to start a new outlook in life when she finds Dì Kōng, now using his given name Lóu Zhèn Jiè, as the new wielder of the Seven Blasphemous Deaths, and becomes his first victim. Kuáng Juàn reveals to Xuě Yā his pursuit of Shāng Bù Huàn was a front to his modus operandi: the smuggling and selling of stolen goods from Xī Yōu to Dōng Li. Kuáng Juàn proposes that Xuě Yā join him by selling the swords Xuě Yā stole from the Xuán Guǐ Zōng clan to Xī Yōu and both reap its profits. Xuě Yā accepts.
23	10	"Demonic Swords/Holy Swords" "Maken/Seiken" (Japanese: 魔剣 / 聖剣)	December 3, 2018
Bù Huàn meets up with Wū Yáo, who just finished making a grave for Yīng Luò. Bù Huàn is chastised for his compassion for others, which led to everything that is going on so far, before Wū Yáo sets off to face Lóu Zhèn Jiè alone. Xuě Yā sabotages Kuáng Juàn's smuggling operation by switching the swords to be sold instead at their country of origin, revealing them as stolen goods to buyers and pinning Xiào as the culprit. In panic, Kuáng Juàn attacks the buyers and the local lawmen as he flees. Meanwhile, to show his devotion to the Seven Blasphemous Deaths, Zhèn Jiè attacks Xiān Zhèn Fortress, destroying any magic swords within the fortress and slaughtering everyone in his way. Bó Yáng Hóu escapes carrying the three remaining swords from the fortress in his possession. While amazed by Zhèn Jiè's sword skills, the Seven Blasphemous Deaths worry that he may be a danger even to itself.
24	11	"The Dignity of Evil" "Aku no Kyōji" (Japanese: 悪の矜恃)	December 10, 2018
Bù Huàn asks his friend Juǎn Cán Yún to hold onto the Sorcerous Sword Index while he goes after the released swords and their wielders. Kuáng Juàn confronts Xuě Yā over the botched operation and Xuě Yā denies his involvement. Rather than be enraged over the incident, Kuáng Juàn sees it as a relief and abandons the entire operation, opting instead to make a fresh start by creating his own army using the Night of Mourning. Disgusted by Kuáng Juàn's reaction, Xuě Yā leaves him. Zhèn Jiè sets out to find the escaped swords from Xiān Zhèn Fortress and encounters Wū Yáo. During the battle, Zhèn Jiè exploits Wū Yáo's sense of hearing to avoid the sword's charms and detect his location and wounds him. But before he could land the killing blow, Zhèn Jiè falls into Xuě Yā's trap and is taken away by a Demon Bird. Xuě Yā informs Wū Yáo that Kuáng Juàn is out to attack the Dōng Li government. Despite his injures, Wū Yáo goes off to face Kuáng Juàn.
25	12	"The Hunting Fox" "Tsuimei Reiko" (Japanese: 追命靈狐)	December 17, 2018
Lóu Zhèn Jiè ends up in the Wasteland of Spirits and reveals to the Seven Blasphemous Deaths that he was never under the sword's control, wielding it instead of his own free will because he is enamored by its beauty. He intends to die in the wastelands to ensure no one else wields the sword, much to the latter's objections. Mò Wáng appears and attacks Lóu Zhèn Jiè. Làng Wū Yáo finds Xiào Kuáng Juàn in a marketplace and the two engage in a battle. Kuáng Juàn tricks Wū Yáo to wield the Night of Mourning, allowing the former to attack and kill the civilians that were turned into puppets, with the latter unable to protect them and leaving himself open to Kuáng Juàn's attacks. Shāng Bù Huàn arrives and takes the Night of Mourning and uses it to command the puppets to attack Kuáng Juàn. Kuáng Juàn is shocked by Bù Huàn's ability to command as he is badly beaten by the puppets and flees. Bù Huàn later restores the civilians back to normal and he, Wū Yáo and Lǐn Xuě Yā begin their pursuit of Kuáng Juàn. Meanwhile, Zhèn Jiè easily kills Mò Wáng. Desperate to not be forever lost in the wastelands, the Seven Blasphemous Deaths convinces Zhèn Jiè to seek and kill the only remaining threat to it – Shāng Bù Huàn.
26	13	"A Bizarre, Bloodstained Ballad" "Senketsu no Renka" (Japanese: 鮮血の恋歌)	December 24, 2018
Bù Huàn, Xuě Yā, and Wū Yáo find a hanged Kuáng Juàn with a note, indicating he was killed by Zhèn Jiè, who challenges Bù Huàn to a duel. Bù Huàn accepts and meets Zhèn Jiè in the Demon Spine Mountains where they begin their battle. To avoid being charmed by the Seven Blasphemous Deaths, Bù Huàn allows himself to be turned into a puppet by the Night of Mourning, with Xuě Yā as its wielder. Zhèn Jiè is overwhelmed and asks the sword for its help, but the latter is conflicted in either helping Zhèn Jiè and be its last wielder or allowing Bù Huàn to win and have it trapped in the Index once again. The sword tells Zhèn Jiè to attack Xuě Yā, but realized too late. The Night of Mourning was an illusion set up by Xuě Yā and the real one was now in the hands of Wū Yáo. Wū Yáo restores Bù Huàn and the trio separates Zhèn Jiè from the Seven Blasphemous Deaths. Bù Huàn begins to seal the sword, but Zhèn Jiè reaches out and grabs it, creating a shockwave that cuts off his arm and sending him into the deep abyss, falling to his death with the sword in hand. The trio return to the Xiān Zhèn Fortress with Juǎn Cán Yún and Dān Fěi, along with the Sorcerous Sword Index. The party realizes Bù Huàn has only captured Zhèn Jiè's severed arm, but both agree the latter met its fate along with the sword. Bó Yáng Hóu arrives to apologize to Bù Huàn for suspecting him, and asks him to add the three surviving swords from the fortress – all designed to be used in the event of a demon invasion, into the Index, and Bù Huàn as its protector. In the post-credits scene, learning of Xiē Yīng Luò's fate, Huò Shì Míng Huáng calls for an assault on Dōng Li when he is visited by Xíng Hài, who proposes an alliance with the demon realm for the invasion.

== Season 3 ==
No. overall	No. in season	Title	Original release date
27	1	"The Void Junction" "Mukaikaku" (Japanese: 無界閣)	April 3, 2021
Shāng Bù Huàn and his party's search for Lóu Zhèn Jiè's remains and the Seven Blasphemous Deaths leads them back to the Demon Spine Mountains and must once again traverse into the Labyrinth of Darkness. Deep into the labyrinth, Xíng Hài reveals to two subjects of Huò Shì Míng Huáng that she converted it into her own realm, the Void Junction, and creating the Scrying Mirrors as a means of teleporting anywhere in the world. One of Míng Huáng's subjects, Wā̀n Jūn Pò, suspects the mirrors can also be used to open a portal to the Demon Realm. Xíng Hài does not deny this, but also replies that a diplomatic relationship between the Demon Realm and the owner of the Shén Huì Mó Xiè (weapons designed against demons) is more beneficial than to open warfare, thus the need to retrieve the Sorcerous Sword Index off Bù Huàn and be given instead to Míng Huáng. When they learn that Bù Huàn's party has entered the labrynth, Xíng Hài and Yì Piāomiǎo, another of Míng Huáng's subjects, ambushed them.
28	2	"Sorcerous Sojourn" "Makyō Hyōryū" (Japanese: 魔境漂流)	April 10, 2021
Lóu Zhèn Jiè, having survived his battle with Bù Huàn, wanders within the Void Junction and is separated from the Seven Blasphemous Deaths when he touched a Scrying Mirror. He is then teleported to a world occupied by Guǐ Duó Tiān Gōng, a wizard from Xī Yōu. Upon learning the circumstances of Zhèn Jiè's arrival, the wizard proposes building a prosthetic arm for Zhèn Jiè in exchange of helping him re-open the portal back to Zhèn Jiè's point of origin. Overwhelmed by their enemies, Bù Huàn makes a desperate escape by using one of the Scrying Mirrors and teleports himself and his party to another world. He reveals he is familiar of the Scrying Mirrors and their unreliability that the location they're being teleported to is randomized. After dealing with some wild natives, Bù Huàn uses the Scrying Mirror again and they are teleported this time to the Phoenix Light Palace, the home of Xī Yōu's Emperor. As Bù Huàn gathers his comrades, Làng Wū Yáo has an unwanted reunion with Cháo Fēng, the Princess of Xī Yōu.
29	3	"The Infatuated Princess" "Aishū no Kōjo" (Japanese: 愛執の皇女)	April 17, 2021
Guǐ Duó Tiān Gōng succeeds in building a machine that would take him and Lóu Zhèn Jiè back to the Void Junction, but after ridiculing Zhèn Jiè's obsession with the Seven Blasphemous Deaths, Zhèn Jiè attacks the wizard and destroys the machine before entering the portal himself. Cháo Fēng reveals she has sent countless soldiers to their deaths finding Làng Wū Yáo. In her obsession, Cháo Fēng stabs Wū Yáo before Bù Huàn's party arrives to the rescue. They later meet Wā̀n Jūn Pò, who offers them a way to escape, unaware that he is leading them to Huò Shì Míng Huáng's lair. Jūn Pò asks Bù Huàn to surrender the Sorcerous Sword Index, but he refuses, leading the two former comrades to battle one another.
30	4	"Whereabouts of a Demon Sword" "Maken no Yukue" (Japanese: 魔剣の行方)	April 24, 2021
Suspecting Bù Huàn has reclaimed the Seven Blasphemous Deaths, Zhèn Jiè uses a Scrying Mirror to take himself to Míng Huáng's lair, leading into a 3-way battle between Bù Huàn, Zhèn Jiè, and Jūn Pò. The intensity of the battle causes everyone to split up - Bù Huàn lures Zhèn Jiè away from Wū Yáo, who rests in a cave to recover his wounds; Xuě Yā (using his alias Guǐ Niǎo) joins with Jūn Pò to plot against Bù Huàn; Juǎn Cán Yún and Líng Yá make their way to the Odd Shack to seek help from Tiān Gōng Guǐ Jiàng, the creator of the Sorcerous Sword Index. There, they encounter Mù Tiān Mìng, a friend of Bù Huàn and Wū Yáo, who is now blind. Xíng Hài stumbles upon the Seven Blasphemous Deaths and, upon picking it up, recognizes the entity within the sword as one of her demon sisters.
31	5	"Legend of The Demon Princess" "Yōki Densetsu" (Japanese: 妖姫伝説)	May 1, 2021
Cán Yún returns to Wū Yáo with the medicine from Guǐ Jiàng. Bù Huàn also returns after Zhèn Jiè loses his pursuit of him. After Wū Yáo recovers and learns of what happened, he berates Bù Huàn for not going to the Odd Shack himself to see Tiān Mìng. Xíng Hài learns from her sister's memories on how the latter, Zhào Jūn Lín, infiltrated Xī Yōu as a human and corrupted the Emperor and his successors, becoming the sword known as the Seven Blasphemous Deaths, and her encounter with Bù Huàn, leading the two sisters to learn they share a common enemy.
32	6	"Huò Shì Míng Huáng" "Kasei Meikou" (Japanese: 禍世螟蝗)	May 8, 2021
In a flashback, Bù Huàn, Wū Yáo, and Tiān Mìng battle against Huò Shì Míng Huáng. The trio are forced to flee as Míng Huáng is too powerful and permanently blinds Tiān Mìng. In the present, Bù Huàn explains that he left Xī Yōu because he would not further risk the lives of his comrades for the safety of the Sorcerous Sword Index, and until the Index is safely secured, he could not visit Tiān Mìng. Bù Huàn's party then wait for the Scrying Mirror to take them back to the Void Junction and resume their search for the Seven Blasphemous Deaths. Xíng Hài is furious that Xuě Yā is with Jūn Pò and more so that Jūn Pò is convinced Xuě Yā is on their side. Jūn Pò is summoned back into the Phoenix Light Palace, and thus instructs Yì Piāomiǎo to monitor Xuě Yā and Xíng Hài, suspecting they would betray them in the near future. In the palace, Cháo Fēng orders Jūn Pò to execute his soldiers (much to his horror) for failing to find Wū Yáo, until Lóu Zhèn Jiè arrives providing information as to how to track Bù Huàn. The princess then orders Jūn Pò and a small hunting party to assist Zhèn Jiè. Jūn Pò and Zhèn Jiè recognize each other and, learning they share a common enemy in Bù Huàn, agree to work together.
33	7	"Counts of Hell" "Makai Hakushaku" (Japanese: 魔界伯爵)	May 15, 2021
Xuě Yā overhears Xíng Hài's plan to use the Void Junction to travel back in time to restore Zhào Jūn Lín's demonic form and informs Bù Huàn, whose party just arrived into the Void Junction. Seeing no surprise reaction, Xuě Yā deduces Bù Huàn has used the Scrying Mirror to travel through time before. Wū Yáo rebukes Bù Huàn for not sharing this knowledge and use it to go back to the past and save Tiān Mìng. Xuě Yā uses a Scrying Mirror to forcibly teleport Bù Huàn and Wū Yáo away just as Yì Piāomiǎo arrives, while Cán Yún goes into hiding. Xuě Yā convinces Piāomiǎo that his conversation with Bù Huàn is part of a deceitful plot against him. Zhào Jūn Lín notes that in order to fulfill Xíng Hài's plan, they would need assistance from Azibělpher, a Count from the Demon Realm that has the power to manipulate space and time. Azibělpher however refuses to help the sisters, citing the Demon Lord has mandated non-interactions with the Human Realm since the demons' defeat against the humans in the War of the Fading Dusk, and that Azibělpher himself has lost interest in humans as well. Bù Huàn and Wū Yáo then arrive at the Demon Realm and are forced to fight a group of demons. During the battle, Wū Yáo uses his singing voice to defeat the demons, which caught Azibělpher's attention.
34	8	"Schemes and Conspiracies" "Inbō Kikei" (Japanese: 陰謀詭計)	May 22, 2021
Lóu Zhèn Jiè and Wā̀n Jūn Pò arrive at the Void Junction and, upon seeing Lǐn Xuě Yā, Zhèn Jiè attacks him. Jūn Pò intervenes explaining that Xuě Yā is on their side. Azibělpher agrees to aid the sisters and begins the process of powering the Void Junction for time travel. Xíng Hài reports of Zhèn Jiè's arrival to Zhào Jūn Lín. The latter warns that Zhèn Jiè is dangerous and must be dealt with caution, and is angered when Xíng Hài assumes that her sister's weakened state was due to her using almost all of her magic to save Zhèn Jiè from death. Jūn Pò's soldiers question allying with the Order of The Divine Swarm. But Xuě Yā, disguised as a Xī Yōu soldier, convinces them that it is for the good of their mission. Xuě Yā then notifies Jūn Pò of Xíng Hài's plans, prompting Jūn Pò to report it to Huò Shì Míng Huáng. Míng Huáng instructs Jūn Pò to allow Zhào Jūn Lín to be resurrected, to be used as bait to lure out Shāng Bù Huàn and ambush him to take the Sorcerous Sword Index. Back at the Demon Realm, Xuě Yā remotely reports to Bù Huàn of the situation in the Void Junction, adding that Xíng Hài's plan is already in motion, and also that she did not disclose that the Seven Blasphemous Deaths is at her possession. The Scrying Mirror then activates and Bù Huàn and Wū Yáo use it to return to the Void Junction to stop Zhào Jūn Lín's revival.
35	9	"The Cross-Time Guardian" "Toki no Tsuji Gami" (Japanese: 時の辻神)	May 29, 2021
Jūn Pò informs Piāomiǎo of Huò Shì Míng Huáng's plan and laments his helplessness. Piāomiǎo tests Jūn Pò's loyalty by suggesting he ignore his master's orders to which Jūn Pò refuses. Meanwhile Bù Huàn and Wū Yáo barges into Xíng Hài's chamber just as she finished empowering a scrying mirror with time travelling powers. Wū Yáo is able to get ahold of the mirror but runs off instead of destroying it, still believing he can use it to save Tiān Mìng. As he makes his escape he is joined by Cán Yún, with Bù Huàn and Xíng Hài following behind. The group makes their way into the chamber with Jūn Pò and Piāomiǎo and a fight breaks out. During the skirmish the scrying mirror is shattered into two. Bù Huàn's group manages to escape with one half, while Xíng Hài retrieves the other. Xíng Hài summons Xuě Yā to interrogate him about his involvement with what transpired, and tricks him into looking at the Seven Blasphemous Deaths. He is overpowered by Xíng Hài and succumbs to the sword's charms, becoming its new wielder. Elsewhere in the Void Junction Bù Huàn and Wū Yáo argues about using the mirror to alter the past. Azibělpher appears out of the mirror and sends the two back in time. Cán Yún is forced to hide as Zhèn Jiè arrives to collect the mirror. Wū Yáo is sent to the fateful battle against Huò Shì Míng Huáng while Bù Huàn is sent to an unknown location where he witnesses the Tiān Xíng Jiàn being forged, along with a mysterious figure.
36	10	"Secrets of Sacred Swords" "Seiken no Himitsu" (Japanese: 聖剣の秘密)	June 5, 2021
Bù Huàn finds himself 200 years in the past during the War of the Fading Dusk and meets Bái Lián. Bái Lián explains he is from a different realm and was transported to this current location through unknown means. Seeing his swords have somehow gained magical powers, he gave the weapons to the humans to fight the demons, and eventually started forging more. Sensing Bù Huàn is from the future, he wonders if he is here to inform him on the fate of the weapons. Upon seeing the Sorcerous Sword Index, he realizes the destruction they have caused, and offers to take the scroll from him. Bù Huàn turns him down, relieved the source of the weapons isn't a divine being, and is happy to continue protecting the swords. Azibělpher tries to coax Wū Yáo into interfering with Huò Shì Míng Huáng and saving Tiān Mìng. He explains the consequence would be Yāo Tú Lí rampaging through Dōng Li, as the event that triggered Bù Huàn crossing the Wasteland of Spirits would not occur. Wū Yáo ultimately chooses to let the events play out, much to Azibělpher's amusement. He then takes him further back in time. In the Void Junction Xíng Hài devises a plot to revive her sister without causing major changes to the timeline. She plans to use a scrying mirror to retrieve Zhào Jūn Lín's body and bring it to present time, where she will revive it. Bù Huàn awakens back at the Junction with only Cán Yún present and hands him the Index as he prepares to deal with Zhào Jūn Lín's return. As they part ways, Xuě Yā walks in wielding the Seven Blasphemous Deaths.
37	11	"Distant Song" "Tōi Utagoe" (Japanese: 遠い歌声)	June 12, 2021
Xuě Yā kills Cán Yún using the Seven Blasphemous Deaths while Xíng Hài subdues Bù Huàn. Piāomiǎo snatches up the Index and bargains with Xíng Hài for Bù Huàn's survival in exchange for some of the swords. The two are unable to come to an agreement and Piāomiǎo hands Jūn Pò the Index while he contacts his master. He unsuccessfully attempts to usurp Jūn Pò, and Huò Shì Míng Huáng orders him to watch the general in case he does plan a betrayal. With Xuě Yā and Bù Huàn captured, Xíng Hài plots to lure Dān Fěi to the Void Junction and have a reanimated Cán Yún kill her. Zhèn Jiè overhears the two talking and is reunited with the Seven Blasphemous Deaths, much to her dismay. Allying himself with the demonic sisters, he agrees to aid them in their plot and the three depart for the past. Azibělpher and Wū Yáo arrive in the past, where they see a young Zhòu Xún Yīn, Wū Yáo's mother, at the Phoenix Light Palace. Xún Yīn was in a secret relationship with a disguised Azibělpher. After revealing she is bearing his child, Azibělpher shows his true self to her and blinds her. Unwilling to terminate the child, despite him carrying a demon's blood, she runs away into the mountains where Wū Yáo was born. Azibělpher takes a distraught Wū Yáo back to the Void Junction, promising his son they will meet again.
38	12	"The Patriot, Once Again" "Resshi Saiki" (Japanese: 烈士再起)	June 19, 2021
Jūn Pò informs both soldiers of Xī Yōu and the Order of the Divine Swarm of the truth surrounding the Void Junction, as well as him being a double-agent, and intends to stop Zhào Jūn Lín. Despite the animosity from both sides, the soldiers choose to join Jūn Pò in destroying all the Scrying Mirrors. Jūn Pò sets Xuě Yā free but keeps Bù Huàn imprisoned due to his loyalty to Míng Huáng, and that he intends to fight Zhào Jūn Lín alone using the Sorcerous Sword Index. Jūn Pò then tells Bù Huàn that should the latter free himself somehow, they would have one final battle for possession of the Index. Dān Fěi arrives at the Void Junction and meets Wū Yáo, and they encounter the still-charmed Xuě Yā. Dān Fěi easily deduces he is in fact her husband, Cán Yún, and angrily knocks him down to remove his disguise, then dispels the charm cast on him. Cán Yún explains in a flashback that he was disguised as Xuě Yā by the latter to avoid detection from their enemies, and is angry he wasn't informed that he would end up under the influence of the Seven Blasphemous Deaths. In the past, Zhào Jūn Lín's body is retrieved and her spirit within the Seven Blasphemous Deaths is transferred back to her body, thus resurrecting her. Shocked at the revelation, Lóu Zhèn Jiè begs for Zhào Jūn Lín to return to the sword, but is knocked out and trapped in the past as the two demon sisters return to the present. There, they find all the other Scrying Mirrors destroyed by Jūn Pò's group, but Azibělpher informs them that the Void Junction is now fully connected to the Demon Realm, allowing the demons to invade the Human Realm once more. As Xíng Hài goes to re-animate Cán Yún's corpse, she finds out that it is in fact Yì Piāomiǎo. Peering into the latter's memories, Xíng Hài learns that Xuě Yā convinced Piāomiǎo to be disguised as Cán Yún to infiltrate Bù Huàn and get the Sorcerous Sword Index. Meanwhile, the real Lǐn Xuě Yā (still disguised as Piāomiǎo) asks Jūn Pò of his intention with the Index, and the latter responds he will go forward in stopping Zhào Jūn Lín and bids "Piāomiǎo" farewell.
39	13	"Zhào Jūn Lín" "Shou Kun Rin" (Japanese: 照君臨)	June 26, 2021
Dān Fěi, Wū Yáo, and Cán Yún assist Jūn Pò's troops to drive off the invading demons, while Jūn Pò himself battles against Zhào Jūn Lín. He pulls several swords from the Sorcerous Sword Index, but are ineffective against Zhào Jūn Lín due to his association with the dark arts. Jūn Pò ultimately settles on a flaming sword that burns away at his body. Xíng Hài interrogates Bù Huàn until Xuě Yā arrives carrying still intact Scrying Mirrors, which he offers in exchange for Bù Huàn's release. When Xíng Hài slips that her sister is of flesh and blood, Xuě Yā ends the ruse and leaves, revealing that Bù Huàn has long been gone from his prison and was communicating remotely. Bù Huàn arrives to aid Jūn Pò, but is unable to kill the demon sorceress as her blood is also cursed so her soul is transferred to whatever blade strikes her down. Xuě Yā arrives with Lóu Zhèn Jiè and the latter stabs Zhào Jūn Lín, transferring her soul back into the Seven Blasphemous Deaths. Agreeing to never return, Zhèn Jiè allows Xuě Yā to teleport him into the vastness of space, where he dies with the screaming Seven Blasphemous Deaths in his arms. Dying from his wounds, Jūn Pò asks Xuě Yā to teleport him to the Emperor's chamber in Xī Yōu, while telling his soldiers to accept Dān Fěi's offer to join the Hù Yìn Shī, and bidding Bù Huàn and others farewell. Upon arrival, it was revealed that Huò Shì Míng Huáng was in fact the Emperor of Xī Yōu and kills Jūn Pò. Cháo Fēng arrives and is angered at Jūn Pò's treachery and stomps at his corpse. Míng Huáng nevertheless commends his daughter for running the country in his place. Bù Huàn uses one of the swords from the Sorcerous Sword Index to create an explosion to seal the entrance to the Void Junction. As he and his party leave, Wū Yáo suddenly turns around and re-enters the Void Junction before the entrance is fully sealed. There, he communicates with Azibělpher, who has the gate to the Demon Realm still open. Wū Yáo begrudgingly accepts his father's invitation and enters the Demon Realm with Xíng Hài as his guide.

== Season 4 ==
No. overall	No. in season	Title	Original release date
40	1	"Homecoming" "Kikyō" (Japanese: 帰郷)	October 5, 2024
Shāng Bù Huàn falls into a depression over the sudden departure of Làng Wū Yáo at the end of season 3, and decides to hide away with the Index. Lǐn Xuě Yā, finding this prospect boring, leaves Shāng in search of new adventures. Azibělpher (appearing as a projection) guides Wū Yáo and Xíng Hài through the demon realm. He shows them the current state of the realm, where demons are forced to worship and sacrifice themselves to the demon gods out of fear of them reawakening, which greatly upsets Xíng Hài. As they continue the tour, they are led to the den of a Hàn Jiǎo, a fearsome demonic beast. Azibělpher informs Wū Yáo that he must awaken his demonic powers and defeat the beast to have any chance of challenging him, which Wū Yáo accepts. In Xī Yōu, Guǐ Duó Tiān Gōng meets with Huò Shì Míng Huáng and presents him his research on dimensional travel, and requests assistance from the Order of the Divine Swarm in travelling the demon realm. Bà Wáng Yù and Huā Wú Zōng both volunteer for the mission, and after a short fight, are gifted with divine weapons to aid in the expedition.
41	2	"Demonic Banquet" "Makai no Utage" (Japanese: 魔界の宴)	October 12, 2024
Lǐn Xuě Yā, disguised as Yì Piāo Miǎo, reports to Huò Shì Míng Huáng about the current status of Shāng Bù Huàn. Huò Shì Míng Huáng orders him not to take action, leading Xuě Yā to suspect he has other plans in the works. Dān Fěi meets with the emperor's younger brother, Yàn Xī, over concerns of a impending demon invasion, which are not taken seriously. Hoping to increase the human force's strength, she decides to embark on an expedition to find a legendary weapon that was lost in the Wasteland of Spirits, which would require Shāng Bù Huàn's help. In the demon realm, Làng Wū Yáo finds himself overwhelmed by the Hàn Jiǎo. On the verge of death he gets a burst of strength and kills the creature. In a fit of rage, he continues beating it long after it has died, much to the amusement of Azibělpher. Wū Yáo's demonic powers awaken as a horn sprouts from his head. Bà Wáng Yù and Huā Wú Zōng arrives elsewhere in the demon realm. The two easily slaughters a number of Hàn Jiǎo using their divine weapons, and catches the attention of a demon count named Ansatt. The demon treats them with surprising hospitality, and explains the demon lord has forbidden the demon royalty from sparring with one another directly, and wishes to use the pair as proxies to assassinate one of his peers. The pair agree and Ansatt tells them their target is Azibělpher. In Xī Yōu, Cháo Fēng receives news that Tiān Gōng Guǐ Jiàng's hideout has been discovered, and plans to lead a raid herself.
42	3	"Heroic Resolve" "Kyōkaku No Ketsui" (Japanese: 侠客の決意)	October 19, 2024
Dān Fěi asks Shāng Bù Huàn to join her and Juǎn Cán Yún on their mission, to which he refuses, believing he will attract trouble. Dān Fěi and Cán Yún are given masks to filter the miasma of the wasteland. When Bù Huàn arrives to deliver them a map of the wastelands, he sees Cán Yún wearing the mask and abruptly decides to join them. He asks Cán Yún to accept a request from him later during the journey, which the confused Cán Yún agrees. In the demon realm, as Wū Yáo is resting, Azibělpher explains his plot to Xíng Hài. He plans to use Wū Yáo's thirst for revenge to kill the demon court and disrupt the status quo. The Hàn Jiǎo nest that they have stepped foot on is in fact the territory of another demon count, Kyarei, and the Hàn Jiǎo that was killed was intended to be her prey. The Kyarei arrives for her hunt and upon seeing her prey already killed, challenges Wū Yáo to a fight. Huò Shì Míng Huáng orders "Yì Piāo Miǎo" to enter the demon realm and monitor his other two subordinates. Guǐ Duó Tiān Gōng informs Huò Shì Míng Huáng that he wishes to settle an old grudge before permanently departing for the demon realm himself. The Xī Yōu army launches an attack on Tiān Gōng Guǐ Jiàng and Mù Tiān Mìng. While the pair were initially able to fend off the forces, Cháo Fēng exploits Tiān Mìng's hearing and soon backs them into a corner. Guǐ Duó Tiān Gōng interrupts the battle with a machine gun, declaring Tiān Gōng Guǐ Jiàng the target of his grudge.
43	4	"Bizarre Contests of Skill" "Kikou Daiketsu" (Japanese: 奇巧対決)	October 26, 2024
"Yì Piāo Miǎo" encounters his "comrades" in the demon realm. Bà Wáng Yù was busy feasting on the inhabitants of the realm, while Huā Wú Zōng brags he knows Huò Shì Míng Huáng's true identity, which piques "Yì Piāo Miǎo"'s interest. Guǐ Duó Tiān Gōng kills all of the Xī Yōu forces save Cháo Fēng and a lone officer. Tiān Gōng Guǐ Jiàng, furious at Guǐ Duó Tiān Gōng for disobeying their master's teachings, unleashes a massive mechanical suit that he has secretly constructed. With the help of Mù Tiān Mìng, he lands a fatal blow on Guǐ Duó Tiān Gōng. The dying man opens a portal to the demon realm and draws in everyone in the area. Satisfied with his work, the cyborg wizard passes away. Elsewhere in the demon realm, Làng Wū Yáo fights Kyarei. Kyarei has the upper hand in the battle and is intrigued by Wū Yáo, who seemed to be afraid of his true nature. Wū Yáo, determined to kill Azibělpher, accepts his demonic powers and lets out a massive yell before killing Kyarei. This yell is heard by Mù Tiān Mìng and Cháo Fēng. Xíng Hài, now impressed by Wū Yáo, extracts a seal from Kyarei's corpse and hands it to him. In the Wasteland of Spirits, Shāng Bù Huàn, Dān Fěi and Juǎn Cán Yún struggles through a sandstorm.
44	5	"The Demonic Court" "Makyū Kizoku" (Japanese: 魔宮貴族)	November 2, 2024
Shāng Bù Huàn, Dān Fěi and Juǎn Cán Yún takes shelter in a crevice from sandstorm, but are attacked by vines, forcing them to retreat. Mù Tiān Mìng saves Cháo Fēng while her officer runs off and is mauled by a Hàn Jiǎo. The two form a truce as they search for Wū Yáo, though Cháo Fēng blames Tiān Mìng for taking him away from the safety of her palace. The Order of the Divine Swarm members arrive at Azibělpher's palace. Bà Wáng Yù launches a direct full frontal assault while Huā Wú Zōng turns invisible and sneaks in amongst the commotion as "Yì Piāo Miǎo" watches. At the same time, Wū Yáo and Xíng Hài arrive at the gates to witness the assault. Lǐn Xuě Yā drops his disguise and informs them that Huā Wú Zōng has already entered the building. Xuě Yā casts a temporary invisibility spell on Wū Yáo, allowing him to enter in search of Azibělpher. Now alone with Xíng Hài, Xuě Yā then consults her on the demon realm, explaining that he does not seem to be negatively affected by the realm's miasma as humans should. He muses that he may be of demonic origins himself. Azibělpher however was not in his palace, having departed early for a meeting with the demon court. Ansatt is taken aback by his presence. As the remaining nobles arrive, they discuss the death of Kyarei. Given that her seal was missing, they conclude that her death was intentional, and the culprit is one of the nobles. The demon lord reminds them that four seals are needed to bring forth a new demon god. He orders the nobles to guard their seals while searching for Kyarei's. As Wū Yáo searches for Azibělpher in his palace, and is attacked from behind by Huā Wú Zōng.
45	6	"A Storm of Schemes" "Bōryaku no Uzu" (Japanese: 謀略の渦)	November 9, 2024
Làng Wū Yáo fends off Huā Wú Zōng in Azibělpher's palace. Realizing his father is not present, he retreats. Huā Wú Zōng and Bà Wáng Yù do the same. The next day, the nobles hold another meeting. Azibělpher informs them his palace was raided by two humans wielding divine weapons, and suspects another noble is targeting their seals. The demon lord orders the humans be driven out of the demon realm. Huā Wú Zōng and Bà Wáng Yù start to question their alliance with Ansatt. Lǐn Xuě Yā, back in his Yì Piāo Miǎo disguise, informs his "comrades" of the demon nobles' seals, pretending to have gotten this information from Huò Shì Míng Huáng. He surmises that their mission was at test to collect these seals. Desperate to prove themselves to their leader, the two split up in search of Ansatt. Huā Wú Zōng and Bà Wáng Yù each encounter demon nobles Uraina and Hailasu respectively. Both pairs form alliances to assassinate the other nobles and collect their seals in exchange for great rewards. Ansatt makes contact with Wū Yáo. As they share a common enemy of Azibělpher, he offers to empower Wū Yáo with heretical magic so he may have the upper hand against his father. Azibělpher watches this from afar, seemingly unconcerned. He is instead interested in the two human intruders and uses Xíng Hài to get in contact with Huò Shì Míng Huáng. In the Wasteland of Spirits, Shāng Bù Huàn's party climb a mountain to get above the heavy miasma. Bù Huàn comes to the disturbing realization that the miasma in the wasteland is the same as that of the demon realm. Mù Tiān Mìng's group continue their search for Wū Yáo, and run into two demon siblings.
46	7	"Beyond the Sorcerous Path" "Madou no Hate" (Japanese: 魔道の果て)	November 16, 2024
Lǐn Xuě Yā saves Mù Tiān Mìng's group from the demons using illusions and takes them to a hiding spot. He informs them he is aware of Làng Wū Yáo's whereabouts, but refuses to tell them more until he finds a use for the group. Azibělpher explains to Xíng Hài the curse behind his time manipulation abilities. He finds himself living a hollow life that is predetermined by his future self, while also losing memories of whatever hardships he encountered in the past. As such, he is impressed by his son's refusal to change the past. Ansatt places Wū Yáo into a cocoon where he has a nightmare questioning his humanity. Uraina and Hailasu hold a banquet for each other, and are both assassinated by their rival's human ally. As Huā Wú Zōng and Bà Wáng Yù collect the seals, Xíng Hài arrives, supposedly under the orders of Huò Shì Míng Huáng, announcing he has disowned them for killing the demon nobles and traps them within a scrying mirror. She then sends a message to the demon court. Shāng Bù Huàn descends into the crevasse to investigate if it is linked to the demon realm.
47	8	"Reunion" "Saikai" (Japanese: 再会)	November 23, 2024
The demon court holds another meeting, this time only attended by three nobles and the demon lord. Noticing their rapidly dwindling numbers, Azibělpher suggest unleashing the demon gods to the human world instead of having them rampage the demon realm. The court receives a message from Xíng Hài informing them of Uraina and Hailasu's death, and that the perpetrators are currently imprisoned. This prompts Fujirai to leave to execute them, while Kyuchirian searches for Ansatt. Alone with the demon lord, Azibělpher tells him that he has formed an alliance with Huò Shì Míng Huáng. Fujirai enters the barrier where Huā Wú Zōng and Bà Wáng Yù are imprisoned. She overpowers Bà Wáng Yù and breaks her shoulder, forcing Huā Wú Zōng to rescue her and retreat. The two work together and sets up a sneak attack on Fujirai, killing her, but the demoness breaks Huā Wú Zōng's leg in the process. Despite both being crippled, they commend each other on their strength and wit. Huò Shì Míng Huáng, as the emperor, is informed that Cháo Fēng is missing and demands she be found. He receives word from "Yì Piāo Miǎo" that Cháo Fēng is currently in the demon realm in search of Làng Wū Yáo and orders she be brought back. In the demon realm, Lǐn Xuě Yā separates Cháo Fēng from her group, and sends her through a portal with the promise that Làng Wū Yáo is on the other end. The commotion alerts Mù Tiān Mìng and Tiān Gōng Guǐ Jiàng, who searches for her and encounters the pair of demons again. However Shāng Bù Huàn, having reached the demon realm from above, intervenes and together they defeat the demons. Kyuchirian discovers Ansatt watching over Làng Wū Yáo's cocoon. He kills Ansatt for his treachery and prepares to destroy Wū Yáo's cocoon.
48	9	"Awakening" "Kakusei" (Japanese: 覚醒)	November 30, 2024
Làng Wū Yáo breaks out of his cocoon as Kyuchirian is about to destroy it. Still in a dream like state, he hallucinates Kyuchirian as Huò Shì Míng Huáng during the fateful battle and kills him with lightning powers. He then returns to his cocoon as his nightmare continues. Shāng Bù Huàn escapes the demon realm with his companions. Back on the surface, he contacts Bó Yáng Hóu about his findings, who decides to alert the capital himself. In a nearby cave, Bù Huàn makes his request to Cán Yún. He is asked to wear the miasma-resistant mask and wait in the cave. After some time, a young Shāng Bù Huàn emerges from a portal and spars with Cán Yún. The Cán Yún easily defeats the boy, who asks him to be his master, much to Cán Yún's chagrin. Cháo Fēng awakens back at her palace in Xī Yōu. Realizing Wū Yáo is not with her, she declares she is going to mount an invasion on the demon realm, though desperate pleads are ignored. Huā Wú Zōng and Bà Wáng Yù escape from their prison, and encounter "Yì Piāo Miǎo". The two hand over the three demon seals they collected, as well as their divine weapons. They declare that they are leaving the order to live a life of peace in Dōng Li. Having hoped to turn the two against each other, Lǐn Xuě Yā is enraged by this turn of events. He angrily discards the demon seals, and sets his eyes on Huò Shì Míng Huáng.
49	10	"A Heart, Entrusted" "Takusareta Kokoro" (Japanese: 託された心)	December 7, 2024
Bó Yáng Hóu meets with the Dōng Li government for reinforcements with an impending demonic invasion. He is unable to convince them, citing fears of Xī Yōu invading due to an increase in spy activity. Bó Yáng Hóu brings Hù Yìn Shī to the wastelands to build a fortress by themselves. Shāng's party finds an oasis in the wastelands free of miasma, created by a powerful divine weapon. In the cave, Cán Yún's advises the young Shāng Bù Huàn to reevaluate his mindset when fighting. Their time together comes to an end as the boy's scrying mirror transports him away, leaving behind a bewildered Cán Yún. Inspired by the experience, the young Bù Huàn decides to create his own sword style, named the "Formless Rogue Sword". Líng Yá watches over the sleeping Wū Yáo as several Hàn Jiǎo feed on the corpses of the two demon nobles. As they turn their attention towards the cocoon, Líng Yá, empowered by the demon realm, unleashes his human form (known as Liè Mó Xián) and slaughters the creatures. "Yì Piāo Miǎo" reports Huā Wú Zōng and Bà Wáng Yù's betrayal to Huò Shì Míng Huáng. Míng Huáng reveals he was simply using the two to stir up chaos in the demon realm, and did not expect them to survive anyway. More importantly, he knew all along that Yì Piāo Miǎo has been replaced by Lǐn Xuě Yā, but is not at all bothered by that fact or whatever motives the imposter may have. Xíng Hài and Azibělpher arrive to escort the two to the demon lord, who reveals his face for the first time. Xíng Hài is shocked to see that the demon lord looks identical to Lǐn Xuě Yā.
50	11	"The Demon Lord's Secret" "Maou no Himitsu" (Japanese: 魔王の秘密)	December 14, 2024
At Huò Shì Míng Huáng's request, the demon lord explains his actions at the end of the War of the Fading Dusk. He recognized a fatal flaw in the demon race: a lack of unity and compassion. Despite their overwhelming strength, he foresaw the human race driving them out in the future with their united forces. With this in mind he ended the war in order to reform demon society with such values. The demon lord himself expelled part of his soul containing hedonistic qualities into the human world, which unbeknownst to him reincarnated as Lǐn Xuě Yā. Despite his best efforts, the demon race is still not in the state he hoped for. Instead the demon lord hopes to ally with Huò Shì Míng Huáng to conquer the human realm. Lǐn Xuě Yā is strangely delighted by the revelation of his origins, and marks his doppelganger to be his next target. Azibělpher and Xíng Hài visit Wū Yáo's cocoon, still guarded by Liè Mó Xián. Xíng Hài uses her necromancy to revive several dead Hàn Jiǎo and banishes them along with Liè Mó Xián. Azibělpher retrieves the seals from the two demon nobles' corpses. Together with his own seal, Wū Yáo now has the four seals needed. Azibělpher prepares to use his son as a vessel for the next demon god. Yàn Xī decides to hold an upcoming military parade in the Wasteland of Spirits to the west. He marches Dōng Li's troops into the wastelands, where they meet up with the Hù Yìn Shī's resistance forces. Shāng Bù Huàn hands Dān Fěi the Sorcerous Sword Index and promises his friends he will return before heading back to the demon realm alone in search of Wū Yáo
51	12	"Demonic Pride" "Mazoku no Hokori" (Japanese: 魔族の誇り)	December 21, 2024
Xíng Hài is conflicted over the state of demon society. With the recent revelations, she begins to reevaluate her alliances. Shāng Bù Huàn reenters the demon realm and is immediately greeted by Lǐn Xuě Yā. The two free Liè Mó Xián from his prison, and fill in Bù Huàn on what has happened in the demon realm. The group are confronted by Xíng Hài, who has ultimately decided to ally with the demon lord over Lǐn Xuě Yā. She reveals that she has collected the three demon seals that Lǐn Xuě Yā previously discarded, and uses them to transform into a monstrous demigod. The battle is evened when Xuě Yā produces two divine weapons. Together the group are able to defeat Xíng Hài, with Xuě Yā landing the killing blow. Having witnessed the power of the seals, they realize Azibělpher's plot and searches for Wū Yáo. Emperor Huò Shì Míng Huáng reprimands Cháo Fēng for neglecting her royal duties. Realizing how hopelessly obsessed she is with Làng Wū Yáo, he reveals his true identity to his daughter, and offers her dark magic. Cháo Fēng accepts the offer and is bestowed the emblem of the Scorpion, ready to reenter the demon realm. The demon lord and Azibělpher prepare to reawaken the demon gods and invade the human realm. Wū Yáo continues to hibernate in his cocoon, dreaming of embracing his mother in the snow.

== Season 1 home video release ==
=== Japanese ===
The Japanese version released both DVD and Blu-Ray editions incorporating Traditional Chinese and Japanese subtitles, audio commentaries featuring the Japanese voice casts and Gen Urobuchi, along with an extra soundtrack disc from Hiroyuki Sawano.

Volume	Release date	Episodes	Features
Volume 1	September 7, 2016	1–3	Original script booklet by Gen Urobuchi.; Audio commentaries feat. Gen Urobuchi, Kōsuke Toriumi, and Junichi Suwabe.
Volume 2	October 5, 2016	4–6	Original script booklet by Gen Urobuchi.; Audio commentaries feat. Gen Urobuchi, Rikiya Koyama, Kenichi Suzumura, and Sayaka Ohara.
Volume 3	November 2, 2016	7–9	Original script booklet by Gen Urobuchi.; Audio commentaries feat. Gen Urobuchi, Nobuyuki Hiyama, and Tomokazu Seki.
Volume 4	December 7, 2016	10–13	Original script booklet by Gen Urobuchi.; Extra soundtrack disc.; Audio commentaries feat. Gen Urobuchi, Mai Nakahara, Kenichi Suzumura, Kōsuke Toriumi, and Junichi Suwabe.

=== Taiwanese ===
Edition	Release date	Episodes	Features
Weekly Episode Version	July 8 – September 30, 2016	1–13 (one episode per disc, sold separately)	Taiwanese audio and Traditional Chinese subtitles.; Behind-the-scenes production footage, along with interviews from various staff members.; One bookmark featuring one character per disc package, with episode 1 having an additional postcard.
Dual Language Box Set Version	December 2016	1-13	Taiwanese and Japanese audio.; Traditional Chinese, Simplified Chinese, and English Subtitles.; Same behind-the-scenes production footage and interviews as the Weekly DVD version, only combined.; Two random pages featuring excerpts of character backstories written by Gen Urobuchi per box set.; The Deluxe Edition features an additional small figurine, and poster of Shāng Bù Huàn, along with a postcard set.

== Theatrical films ==
A theatrical film adaptation, Thunderbolt Fantasy: The Sword of Life and Death (Thunderbolt Fantasy 生死一劍, Sandāboruto Fantajī Seishi Ikken; Thunderbolt Fantasy Shēng Sǐ Yī Jiàn), was released in 2017. The special has two parts, akin to an omnibus format. Adapted from the "Setsumushō-hen" ("Shā Wú Shēng Chapter") story from the side novel Thunderbolt Fantasy: Tōriken Kōki Gaiden, part one is a prequel about Shā Wú Shēng's past, while part two features a new story penned by Urobuchi starring Shāng Bù Huàn. This story takes place between the first two seasons. The film was released in eight Japanese cinemas on December 2, and on December 8 in Taiwan. The film was released on a physical disc on April 4, 2018.

The second film, Thunderbolt Fantasy: Bewitching Melody of the West (Thunderbolt Fantasy 西幽玹歌, Sandāboruto Fantajī Seiyū Genka; Thunderbolt Fantasy Xī Yōu Xuán Gē), was released on October 25, 2019, in both Japan and Taiwan and on December 24 on Crunchyroll. The film is an origin story of the Làng Wū Yáo character from childhood to first joining the travels of Shāng Bù Huàn and takes place before the first season. It also introduces the new character of Mù Tiān Mìng a female musician, sword fighter and companion of Shāng Bù Huàn. The film ends with a brief epilogue by Lǐn Xuě Yā teasing that the fate of Mù Tiān Mìng and why she was not with Shāng Bù Huàn when he arrived in Dōng Li.
