= Thunderbolt Fantasy =

Taiwanese/Japanese glove puppetry television series

- Also known as: Thunderbolt Fantasy: Sword Travels in the East; Thunderbolt Fantasy: Sword Seekers
- Created by: Gen Urobuchi
- Written by: Gen Urobuchi
- Directed by: Chris Huang (chief); Jia-Shiang Wang; Pao-Pin Cheng
- Starring: Kohsuke Toriumi; Junichi Suwabe; Mai Nakahara; Tomokazu Seki; Takanori Nishikawa; Katsuyuki Konishi
- Opening theme: "Raimei" by T.M.Revolution (Season 1); "His/Story" by Takanori Nishikawa (Season 2); "Judgement" by Takanori Nishikawa (Season 3); "Ame no Murakumo no Tsurugi -SKYBREAKER-" by Takanori Nishikawa (Season 4)
- Composers: Hiroyuki Sawano; Takafumi Wada (Seasons 2–4); Kohta Yamamoto (Seasons 3–4)
- Countries of origin: Taiwan; Japan
- Original languages: Japanese; Taiwanese Hokkien; Mandarin
- No. of seasons: 4
- No. of episodes: 51 (list of episodes)

Production
- Executive producers: Liang-Xun Huang (Pili International Multimedia); Digitarou (Nitro+); Aki Takanori (Good Smile Company)
- Producer: Hao-Ming Tseng (Pili International Multimedia)
- Cinematography: Pili International Multimedia
- Running time: 23 min.
- Production company: Pili International Multimedia

Original release
- Network: AT-X; Tokyo MX; Nippon BS Broadcasting Corporation
- Release: July 8, 2016 – December 21, 2024

- Thunderbolt Fantasy
- Manga
- Written by: Gen Urobuchi
- Illustrated by: Yui Sakuma
- Published by: Kodansha
- English publisher: NA: Seven Seas Entertainment
- Magazine: Weekly Morning
- Original run: July 21, 2016 – April 6, 2017
- Volumes: 4
- Manga

Otome Genyūki
- Written by: Kairi Shimotsuki
- Published by: Akita Shoten
- Magazine: Champion Cross
- Original run: September 27, 2016 – February 28, 2017
- Volumes: 1
- Novel

Gaiden
- Written by: Erika Mitsunori; Shotaro Teshirogi
- Illustrated by: Shinov Mimori; Minamoto Satoshi
- Published by: Nitroplus Books
- Published: April 7, 2017
- Live-action video

The Sword of Life and Death
- Written by: Gen Urobuchi (Nitro+)
- Studio: Pili International Multimedia
- Released: December 2, 2017
- Runtime: 75 minutes
- Live-action video

Bewitching Melody of the West
- Written by: Gen Urobuchi (Nitro+)
- Studio: Pili International Multimedia
- Released: October 25, 2019
- Runtime: 90 minutes
- Live-action video

The Finale
- Written by: Gen Urobuchi (Nitro+)
- Studio: Pili International Multimedia
- Released: February 21, 2025
- Runtime: 90 minutes

Thunderbolt Fantasy

Chinese name
- Traditional Chinese: 東離劍遊紀
- Simplified Chinese: 东离剑游纪
- Literal meaning: Sword Travels in the East
Transcriptions
Standard Mandarin
- Hanyu Pinyin: Dōnglí Jiànyoújì
- Bopomofo: ㄉㄨㄥ ㄌ一ˊ ㄐㄧㄢˋ ㄧㄡˊ ㄐㄧˋ
Southern Min
- Hokkien POJ: Tông-lî Kiàm-iû-kì

Japanese name
- Kanji: 東離劍遊紀
Transcriptions
- Romanization: Tōriken Yūki

Thunderbolt Fantasy (Japanese: Thunderbolt Fantasy -東離劍遊紀-, Hepburn: Sandāboruto Fantajī: Tōriken Yūki; lit. 'Thunderbolt Fantasy: Sword Travels in the East'), also known as Thunderbolt Fantasy: Sword Seekers, is a Japanese-Taiwanese glove puppetry television series created and written by Gen Urobuchi and produced as a collaboration between Japanese companies Nitroplus and Good Smile Company and Taiwanese puppet production company Pili International Multimedia, creators of Pili ("Thunderbolt") series. The series began airing in Japan on July 8, 2016, and was being simulcast by Bahamut and iQiyi Taiwan (Note: iQiyi Taiwan streams the Japanese dub version.) in Taiwan, bilibili in Mainland China, and Crunchyroll in the United States. It has two official languages: the Taiwanese Min-Nan version aired in Taiwan, and the Japanese version aired outside Taiwan. A manga adaptation illustrated by Yui Sakuma was serialized in Kodansha's Weekly Morning magazine from July 2016, to April 2017. A second adaption, told from the perspective of Dān Fěi, and illustrated by Kairi Shimotsuki, was serialized in Akita Shoten's Champion Cross online magazine from September 2016 to February 2017. A side novel that focuses on the pasts of Lǐn Xuě Yā, Xíng Hài, and Shā Wú Shēng was released on April 7, 2017, and was partially adapted into a film released that year on December 2. A second season aired in 2018, while a film prequel to it was released on October 25, 2019. A third season aired in 2021. A fourth season aired in 2024, with a series finale film released on February 21, 2025.

== Plot ==
Set in an Eastern fantasy setting, Dān Fěi and her brother, guardians of a sword known as the Tiān Xíng Jiàn, are pursued by the evil Xuán Guǐ Zōng clan, who seek to obtain the sword for their master, Miè Tiān Hái. While her brother is defeated, Fěi, who possesses the sword's crossguard, escapes and finds herself in the care of the wandering swordsman, Shāng Bù Huàn, and a mysterious man named Lǐn Xuě Yā, who become her protectors from the pursuing Xuán Guǐ Zōng clan.

== Development ==
In 2014, Urobuchi came across Pili's exhibition booth within a Taiwanese comic convention while he was invited as the convention's special guest. He was greatly impacted by their execution of the art form, prompting him to take home a full set of Pili's puppet show series to share with his associates within the Japanese ACG industry, and was eager to either plan an original story, or license a couple of series with Pili to dub into Japanese. The news of Urobuchi's interest in Taiwanese puppetry quickly made its way to Pili, which had a decent percentage of staff members who were, according to Nitroplus representative, Digitarou, "anime savvy, Urobuchi fans". Therefore, Pili International were also actively searching for ways to contact Urobuchi. Both parties contacted each other within a day's time frame asking if they wanted to create something fun together; after various discussions from both parties, they decided to create an original story that is, first and foremost, "a straight-forward narrative" easy for first-time puppetry viewers and the anime demographic to process and appreciate, hence the birth of the Thunderbolt Fantasy project.

== Media ==
There are television series with four seasons, home video releases, theatrical films, Manga, and novels of the work. Information on television series, home video releases, and theatrical films, can be seen in List of Thunderbolt Fantasy episodes.

=== Soundtrack ===
Thunderbolt Fantasy Original Soundtrack

Soundtrack album by Hiroyuki Sawano
- Released: August 24, 2016
- Genre: Soundtrack
- Length: 76:32
- Label: Aniplex
- Producers: Hiroyuki Sawano; Yasuchi Horiguchi (co-producer)

Hiroyuki Sawano Soundtrack albums chronology
Kabaneri of the Iron Fortress: Original Soundtrack (2016)	Thunderbolt Fantasy Original Soundtrack (2016)

The soundtrack was composed by Hiroyuki Sawano and released on August 24, 2016. The music was composed by Hiroyuki Sawano and the lyrics were written by Benjamin & mpi.

Thunderbolt Fantasy Original Soundtrack
No.	Title	Vocals	Length
1.	"thunderBOLTfantasy"		5:35
2.	"show-no-feel"		4:37
3.	"tanh1"		4:05
4.	"5in4"		5:46
5.	"tpfp1"		2:57
6.	"coldsnowcrow"		4:43
7.	"GKpeople"		4:11
8.	"⚡bolt-arr1"		4:07
9.	"from either way"		4:54
10.	"kill don't 生kill-FUe"		1:03
11.	"Kguy&kill don't 生kiLL"		5:35
12.	"thedead"		4:02
13.	"蔑、guy"		4:36
14.	"⚡bolt-arr2"		4:15
15.	"tfpf2"		2:39
16.	"devigod"		5:28
17.	"Darkest"	Mika Kobayashi; mpi	5:17
18.	"tfpf3"		2:42
Total length:			76:32

=== Manga ===
Two manga adaptations have been released in Japan, the first one under the same title as the television series, written by Urobuchi and illustrated by Yui Sakuma, which was serialized in Kodansha's Weekly Morning magazine from July 21, 2016, to April 6, 2017, and collected into four volumes. This adaptation is licensed in North America by Seven Seas Entertainment.

No.	Original release date	Original ISBN	English release date	English ISBN
1	September 23, 2016	978-4063886412	December 6, 2022	978-1-68579-335-7
Chapters 1–7
2	December 22, 2016	978-4063886757	December 6, 2022	978-1-68579-335-7
Chapters 8–16
3	March 23, 2017	978-4063887068	January 24, 2023	978-1-68579-336-4
Chapters 17–25
4	May 23, 2017	978-4063887266	January 24, 2023	978-1-68579-336-4
Chapters 26–34

The second manga is a webmanga titled Thunderbolt Fantasy: Otome Genyūki (Thunderbolt Fantasy 東離劍遊紀 乙女幻遊奇; lit. 'Thunderbolt Fantasy: Sword Travels in the East – A Maiden's Magical Journey') written by the Thunderbolt Fantasy Project. It is illustrated by Kairi Shimotsuki, creator of Brave 10 and Madness, and presents Dān Fěi's perspective of her journey. Otome Genyūki was serialized in Akita Shoten's Champion Cross web magazine from September 27, 2016, to February 28, 2017, and compiled into one volume.

No.	Japanese release date	Japanese ISBN
1	March 16, 2017	978-4253153171

=== Novel ===
Thunderbolt Fantasy Gaiden was released on April 7, 2017. The novel mainly focuses on Lǐn Xuě Yā, Xíng Hài, and Shā Wú Shēng's pasts. It is written by Mitsunori Enami and Shotaro Teshirogi and illustrated by Shinov Mimori and Satoru Minamoto, and supervised by Gen Urobuchi.
