= Descent into Madness (disambiguation) =

Descent into Madness is a 2025 EP by Enterprise Earth.

Descent into Madness may also refer to:

- "Descent into Madness" (Voltron: The Third Dimension), television episode
- "Descent into Madness", a song by Evile from the 2011 album Five Serpent's Teeth
- Descent into Madness, a book by Vernon Frolick about the murderer Michael Eugene Oros

== See also ==
- "My Descent into Madness", a song by Eels from the 1998 album Electro-Shock Blues
