= Global Maritime Situational Awareness =

Global Maritime Situational Awareness (GMSA) is defined in the U.S. National Concept of Operations for Maritime Domain Awareness, December 2007, as "the comprehensive fusion of data from every agency and by every nation to improve knowledge of the maritime domain." It is an integral element of Maritime Domain Awareness (MDA).

Essentially, no one country, department, or agency holds all of the authorities and capabilities to have effective Maritime Domain Awareness on its own. However, by combining separate pieces of information from agencies at the federal, state, local, and tribal level around the world with information from the maritime industry and other non-governmental organizations, it is possible to keep track of the status of every ocean-bound and sea-bound vessel. GMSA results from combining intelligence given by other regions of the world into a complete picture for identifying trends and detecting anomalies.

== Development of GMSA in the U.S. ==
In the United States, the director for GMSA is responsible for managing data critical to building the situational awareness component of global MDA. The director also develops and recommends policy guidance for coordinated collection, fusion, analysis, and dissemination of GMSA information and products, as well as information integration policies, protocols and standards. The director also recommends improvements to situational awareness-related activities supporting maritime information collection, fusion, analysis and dissemination. The director co-chairs the U.S. National MDA Stakeholder Board, sits on the MDA Stakeholder Board Executive Steering Committee, and is a member of the U.S. Maritime Security Policy Coordinating Committee (MSPCC).

The GMSA staff consists of and is supported by dedicated subject matter experts from across the federal government as selected by the Director from departmental nominees from the Department of Homeland Security, Department of Defense, Director of National Intelligence, Department of Justice, Department of Transportation, Department of Commerce, Department of State, Department of the Treasury, and Department of Energy's National Nuclear Security Administration.

The GMSA Director and staff form the Office of Global Maritime Situational Awareness.

== Maritime anomaly detection ==
Maritime anomaly detection is an area of scientific study aimed at avoiding maritime collisions. There are a number of aspects to this work, and there have been several conferences and workshops exploring the domain. A google search on "Maritime anomaly detection" returns a large number of hits from a wide range of domains. Some of the related topics are:

- Maritime anomaly detection and situation awareness
- Maritime anomaly detection and threat assessment
- Visual analytics for maritime anomaly detection

Some of the significant events exploring the area are:

- The International Workshop on Maritime Anomaly Detection - MAD 2011

== See also ==
- Maritime domain awareness
