= Golden Comic Awards =

Comic award in Taiwan

Golden Comic Awards 漫畫金像獎
- Awarded for: Comic publishing industry recognition
- Location: Taiwan
- First award: 2010
- Website: Official website

The Golden Comic Awards (GCA; traditional Chinese: 漫畫金像獎; simplified Chinese: 漫画金像奖; pinyin: Mànhuà Jīnxiàng Jiǎng) is the annual awards for comics in Taiwan organized by the Ministry of Culture.

== History ==
The first Golden Comic Awards was held in 2010. Since 2017, the award ceremony also started to include other various non-award events.

== Award categories ==
The award categories include Best Comic for Kids, Best Comic for Teenage Boys, Best Comic for Teenage Girls, Best Comic for Young Adults, Best Comic Strip Collection, Best Cross-media Application, Best Editor, Best New Talent, Comic of the Year, and Special Contribution Award.
