= Madness (Ivi Adamou song) =

Single by Ivi Adamou featuring tU
- Released: September 28, 2012
- Recorded: 2012; Athens, Greece
- Genre: Dance-pop, synthpop
- Length: 3:29
- Label: Sony Music Greece
- Songwriter(s): Nalle Ahlstedt, Alexandra Zakka, Dimitris Domakos (tU)
- Producer(s): Nalle Ahlstedt

Ivi Adamou singles chronology
"La La Love" (2012)	"Madness" (2012)	"Avra" (2012)

"Madness" is a song performed by the Cypriot artist Ivi Adamou and a member of the new Greek up-coming band/project tU, Dimitris Domakos. This song will be in Ivi's new studio album. It's the English version of "Fige" a song from her first studio album, San Ena Oniro, however the two versions of the song have a different lyrical meaning.

== Music video ==
It first announced that the video will be released on 5 July but it released one day earlier, on 4 July.

=== Synopsis ===
Adamou is a photographer-reporter while Dimitris (tU lead singer) is graffiti boy. One night she follows him, to plans a big graffiti of the (+) symbol of Amita Motion (wearing mask) and secretly she photographs him. Seeing the pictures which she has taken she falls in love. Watching him and other nights in various places of the city, doing graffiti, siting and reading, talking to a chamber, walking. She photographs him endlessly and he realizes her. They walk both to the street and reach to the same place. She sings to him and they coming closer, the time which going to kiss each other, somebody with motorcycle passes in front of the camera the kiss is missed.

== Track listing ==
Digital download

1. "Madness" – 3:29
2. "Madness" (No Rap Version) – 3:15
3. "Madness" (Rico Bernasconi Remix) – 3:22

== Credits and personnel ==
- Lead vocals – Ivi Adamou
- Producers – Nalle Ahlstedt
- Lyrics – Nalle Ahlstedt, Alexandra Zakka, Dimitris Domakos
- Label: Sony Music Greece/Day 1

== Release history ==
Country	Date	Format	Label
Greece	September 28, 2012	Digital download	Sony Music Greece
Cyprus	September 28, 2012	Digital download	Sony Music Greece
