= Multi-conjugate Adaptive optics Demonstrator =

Astronomical instrument

Multi-conjugate Adaptive optics Demonstrator (MAD) is an instrument that allows the European Southern Observatory's Very Large Telescope to observe celestial objects with most of the atmosphere's blurring removed. As with other adaptive optics systems, it works by performing real-time corrections to the atmospheric turbulence by means of computer-controlled deformable mirrors. Its particularity is the correction over a wider field of view than previous systems, which only used a single deformable mirror.
