= Mad TV (disambiguation) =

Mad TV was a sketch comedy television show.

Mad TV may also refer to:

- Mad TV (video game), a simulation game
- MAD TV (TV channel), a Greek music television channel

== See also ==
- Mad (TV series)
