= Pili (TV series) =

Taiwanese television series

- Official logo since 2020
- Genre: Glove puppetry, action, wuxia
- Country of origin: Taiwan
- Original language: Taiwanese Hokkien

Original release
- Release: 1985

Pili (Traditional Chinese: 霹靂, Pe̍h-oē-jī: Phek-le̍k, "Thunderbolt") is a glove puppetry show from Taiwan. It is made by Pili International Multimedia. The TV series debuted in 1984 and once reached over 90% viewership. Unlike traditional puppet shows, Pili uses computer generated imagery (CGI) during action sequences. The delicate design of the appearance and characteristics of each puppet has made Pili a well-known TV series in Taiwan.

In 2000, the spin-off film Legend of the Sacred Stone was released. It was released on VHS and DVD in Taiwan and Japan (the Japanese edit significantly shortened). The Japanese release includes some unintentionally funny English subtitles, while the Taiwanese release has no English, so the only imports and bootlegs of the film generally found in North America have been of the Japanese version. In 2026, Deaf Crocodile released the film on Blu-Ray in North America.

In February 2006, the American company Animation Collective, known for Kappa Mikey and Speed Racer: The Next Generation created an edited version of Pili on Cartoon Network titled Wulin Warriors. Many fans of the original series complained about the poor quality of the scripts and changes made for the American version. One example was the character Ye Hsiao-Chai (Scar in Wulin Warriors), who is a mute in the Taiwanese version of the series, but in the American version he speaks frequently. Many Cartoon Network viewers were hostile to Wulin Warriors because the programming of the series was part of a shift in the channel's focus to include live action programs. Although Cartoon Network stopped airing Wulin Warriors after only two episodes, all thirteen episodes could be seen on Kids' AOL, but were taken off after a few years and can now only be found on YouTube.

In 2016, Nitroplus, Good Smile Company, and Pili International Multimedia produced Thunderbolt Fantasy, created by Gen Urobuchi, which premiered that summer. Thunderbolt Fantasy is a spin-off of the main Pili series, set in a similar wuxia setting with new characters. The show features slight differences from Pili's usual production approach, including half hour long episodes and anime-inspired character designs. Thunderbolt Fantasy is standalone from the main Pili series, with the exception of minor character cameos.

Pili International Multimedia currently runs their own Twitch account where they occasionally stream Pili.

Pili Fantasy: War of Dragons, a remake of Pili's sixth season, premiered on Netflix in July 2019. This makes War of Dragons the first installment of the main Pili series to air in English speaking countries in an uncut format.

== See also ==
- Huang Hai-tai
