= Madness (manga) =

Japanese yaoi and adventure manga by Kairi Shimotsuki

- The first volume of Madness as published by Gentosha Comics, Inc. on the July 24, 2004
- Genre: Action, Adventure, Romantic Comedy, Fantasy, Yaoi
- Manga
- Written by: Kairi Shimotsuki
- Published by: Gentosha Comics, Inc.
- English publisher: NA: Blu
- Magazine: Comic Manga Lynx
- Original run: July 24, 2004 – present
- Volumes: 2

Madness is a Japanese yaoi and adventure manga series written and illustrated by Kairi Shimotsuki, who also writes shonen and seinen manga. It is serialized in Comic Manga Lynx, under Gentosha Comics, Inc. It is set in 3000 AD, where Catholic priest Izaya and his mass-murderer teammate Kyou fight to save the world from a series of natural disasters. The manga is licensed in North America by Tokyopop's imprint Blu.

== Plot ==
It is the year 3000 AD and Airishuu Izaya Luke is a Catholic priest of the Cult of Saint Ruka. He was charged with watching over Kyou, the leader of a group of murderers called Madness. Kyou has spent the past three years imprisoned in Izaya's church, with no memory of his murderous nature. Kyou's life has become a tranquil one until the day the church is attacked by an old enemy, Sae, a former member of Madness, who is attempting to take Kyou's demon sword Jigfreed. Kyou's murderous nature is awakened and he proceeds to kill Sae. He then goes to keep on killing, but Izaya stops him. As it turns out, Izaya is a Suppressor, someone who can stop Kyou when he snaps and goes crazy. Kyou forcefully takes Izaya with him to be his Suppressor and they go to a big city to turn in Sae's head for his bounty. While there, they run into another former member of Madness, Oboro. After a brief misunderstanding, Oboro joins the group and the three set out together. On their way to another city, Oboro freaks out when he discovers that another Madness member, Miyabi, is supposedly in the next city. Miyabi, Kyou's previous Suppressor, was the person who betrayed Kyou and tried to kill him 3 years earlier. When Kyou sees her hawk, he sets out in mad pursuit with Oboro trying to stop him. Izaya gets lost trying to follow them and ends up being mistaken as a prostitute by a brothel owner. Just as the brothel owner is getting ready to have sex with him, Izaya is saved by a female prostitute who lets the owner sleep with her in exchange for leaving Izaya alone. Afterwards, she helps Izaya escape, but right when he's about to leave, Miyabi's hawk comes followed by Kyou and Oboro. It is then that we find out that the female is actually Miyabi, the former Madness member. After a tense stand-off, Izaya convinces Kyou and Oboro to leave. Later on, Izaya goes to talk to Miyabi, but arrives to find out that she had been sold. He goes off after her, and arrives as the man who bought her attempts to kill her, as he was a bounty hunter who discovered she was really Miyabi. During the fight, Izaya protects Miyabi and gets hurt. The blood and Izaya being injured awaken Miyabi's murderous side and she kills the man. Kyou comes in later and after he and Miyabi fight a while, Izaya breaks them up and convinces them to stop fighting. Miyabi decides to come along with the group to protect Izaya, who turns out to be the younger brother of the man she fell in love with. The group of four then sets out on the next town, where they find out that former Madness members are being hunted down. While in town stocking up on provisions, Miyabi and Izaya are attacked. Miyabi holds off the attackers while Izaya escapes to get help and warn the others. Kyou and Oboro are also attacked, and Miyabi escapes badly injured. The group travels to Kai's hospital to get Miyabi treated. While there, they are ambushed again and Izaya finds out that the assassins are from his religion, which is supposed to abhor murder and violence. This information shatters Izaya and he is broken-hearted until Kyou cheers him up when he tells Izaya that it is his heart that tells him what is good and evil. He still strongly dislikes fighting; however, he resolved to put himself in danger's way because he wishes to assess for himself what is good and what is evil. Since he is a Believer, he is using his knowledge of Ruka's bases to help lead Kyou and his colleagues. While they are preparing to leave to go kill the ambushers, they are again ambushed and Izaya and Miyabi are taken captive. Kyou and Oboro then chase after them. When Izaya awakens after being taken captive, he discovers that the group holds his older brother captive and that they plan on using him to discover the true secret of the "mad men." It is revealed that they used Izaya's older brother in order to make criminals so the assassins may kill them in the name of god. The Madness members had chips implanted in their brains which was made to make them forget anything but their blood desires. Izaya's brother was the one who made them. Later on, with the help of Oboro's explosions, they escape out of the base, separating Izaya and his brother from Kyou, Oboro and Miyabi. Izaya begs them to come bag safely, at which Kyou responds that he won't die till he does him. This somehow giving Izaya hope, he sets out with his brother to escape.

After 2 years Kyou, Miyabi and Oboro had yet to return. Meanwhile, Izaya is found in an open field, along with some children. One of them asks a question to Izaya if he has someone he likes. Izaya responds that he does, and is waiting for that person. Later on, Kyou, Miyabi, Oboro and another Madness member Fake return to Izaya's side. Kyou explains that Kai kept them there for 2 years to remove the chips out of their heads so it delayed them from picking Izaya up. Izaya smiles and understands that that was the reason why Kyou's expression looked much kinder than before. After this Kyou won't waste any time wanting to do Izaya, especially since he states that Izaya has become even more beautiful, embarrassing her, but is interrupted by the others. Kyou takes Izaya to a room and states that for two years, he has been laying in a sickbed of Kai and every time all he thought about was Izaya's face. They have their passionate moment. After this ending, you'll get a kind of map that shows you the relationships of all the characters.

== Characters ==
Airishuu Izaya Luke (イザヤ, Izaya) is a compassionate Catholic priest of the Cult of Saint Ruka. He strongly believes that there is good in everyone and is first to see the kind side of Kyou. He was a very strong Believer in his religion which advocates God and judgment; that the murder of people is wrong. However, when he discovers that it was Ruka all along that was attacking him and Kyou, he loses faith in himself and God until Kyou tells him that it is his heart that tells him what is good and evil. He still strongly dislikes fighting however he resolved to put himself in danger's way because he wishes to assess for himself what is good and what is evil. Since he is a Believer, he is using his knowledge of Ruka's bases to help lead Kyou and his colleagues. He is often the center of argument in the group because he is Kyou's love interest and Suppressor. As Kyou's Suppressor, he has to keep Kyou's bloodthirsty side in check as Kyou gets carried away sometimes by bloodlust. Miyabi would rather have him stay safe because he is the younger brother of someone Miyabi cared about but Kyou insists on taking Izaya along. Oboro isn't very fond at times of Izaya because of his closeness to Kyou.

Kyou (きょう, Kyō) is a former mass murderer of the group Madness who teams up with Izaya. He has trouble recollecting memories of his past but he remembers that was born inside a cell of some sort and as a boy had a lust to kill. He wields a large sword. He was captured and kept in a cell under Ruka's supervision. Because he disappeared, he was proclaimed dead by other members of Madness. It was here that he met Izaya who was very kind to him and snuck into his cell sometimes to keep him company. He has two sides of him; one side is his bloodthirsty side. There is some speculation as to whether this is due to the chip or simply due to his nature. His other side is very kind towards Izaya. Because his bloodlust tends to get the better of him, the only one to stop him was his Suppressor which is currently Izaya. Miyabi, who used to be his love interest, used to be his Suppressor until she tried to kill him. Like all members of Madness, he has a chip that is inserted into his brain which controls his actions if activated. He has no recollection of having the chip inserted into his brain. The members of Ruka appear to have a control which can activate this chip which causes Kyou to vomit. Sometimes Miyabi and Kyou fight over Izaya.

Miyabi (みやび, Miyabi) is Kyou's first Suppressor and another infamous member of the group, Madness. She is a beautiful, albino woman who left Kyou for dead because she didn't want to kill anymore. Like Kyou, though, sometimes her bloodlust gets the better of her though this is due to the chip which Ruka implanted inside her brain. She is very skilled with a long sword. She has a pet bird named Hakuou which brings her her long sword when she needs it. She worked at a brothel where Izaya first meets her. Izaya is the first to see that she was not very happy with what she was doing. Izaya lets her come along on their journey because he believes she would be a much better Suppressor than him. She always has Izaya's best interests in mind and always seeks his safety. She sets off to kill the members of Ruka so that Izaya may remain safe even though she hates killing. Kyou despises her for trying to kill him and the two constantly argue over Izaya.

Oboro (おぼろ, Oboro) is a former member of Madness and Kyou's sidekick. He wields a large barrel gun. He is very loud, jokes around a lot, and says whatever is on his mind without much regard for Izaya's feelings. He is often bossed around by Kyou to which Oboro complies. He often expresses his love for his "nii-san" Kyou who rejects him by punching him in the face. He is very jealous of how close Kyou and Izaya are and often walks in on them when Kyou is making love to Izaya.

Kai (かい, Kai) is a doctor for Madness and often treats Kyou and Miyabi for their wounds. His "hospital" also serves as a base for Madness. He greatly values his assistant and android doll Amane and grew very angry when Ruka infiltrated his facility and attacked Amane's parts room. He mentions that his kiss to Miyabi was simply because he was testing her skin. Should Miyabi die, he wishes to graft her skin onto Amane.

Amane (あまね, Amane) is an android doll created by Kai as an assistant in the lab. He is also Kai's love interest. Amane is very suspicious of anyone who gets between him and Kai. He first calls on Saint Ruka's assassins to give them information that members of Madness were in the laboratory when Kyou and Oboro came to Kai with a wounded Miyabi, so that the assassins would get rid of them as Amane was afraid they would come between him and Kai.

== Manga ==
Madness is written and illustrated by Kairi Shimotsuki. It is serialized in Comic Manga Lynx, under Gentosha Comics, Inc. The manga is licensed in North America by Tokyopop's imprint Blu.

=== Volume list ===
No.	Release date	ISBN
1	July 24, 2004	978-4-34-480430-2
2	July 24, 2004	978-4-34-480431-9

== Reception ==
M. M. Blair feels that Madness has plot elements from seinen and shonen works and also has more "bloody scenes". Blair notes the seinen fanservice in Miyabi's character design, but notes that she is portrayed as being "courageous, generous and strong, with a formidable temper and strength of character".
