= Glove puppetry =

Type of Chinese opera using cloth puppets

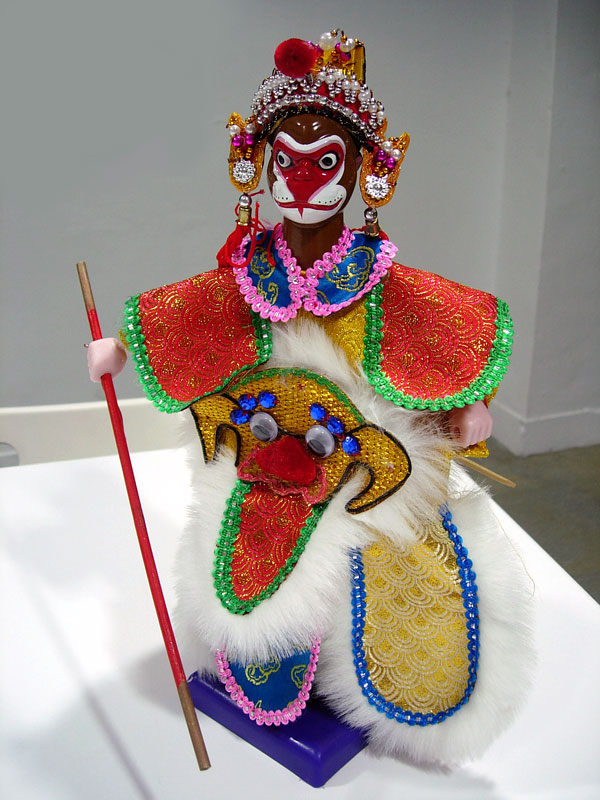
Sun Wukong puppet in pò͘-tē-hì.

Glove puppetry (Chinese: 布袋戲; pinyin: bùdàixì; Pe̍h-ōe-jī: pò͘-tē-hì) is a type of opera using cloth puppets that originated during the 17th century in Quanzhou or Zhangzhou of China's Fujian province, and historically practised in the Min Nan-speaking areas such as Quanzhou, Zhangzhou, the Chaoshan region of Guangdong, and other parts of southern China. It had since established itself contemporarily as a popular art form in Taiwan.

The puppet's head uses wood carved into the shape of a hollow human head, but aside from the head, palms, and feet, which are made of wood, the puppet's torso and limbs consist entirely of cloth costumes. At the time of the performance, a gloved hand enters the puppet's costume and makes it perform. In previous years the puppets used in this type of performance strongly resembled "cloth sacks," hence the name, which literally means "cloth bag opera."

== Performances ==
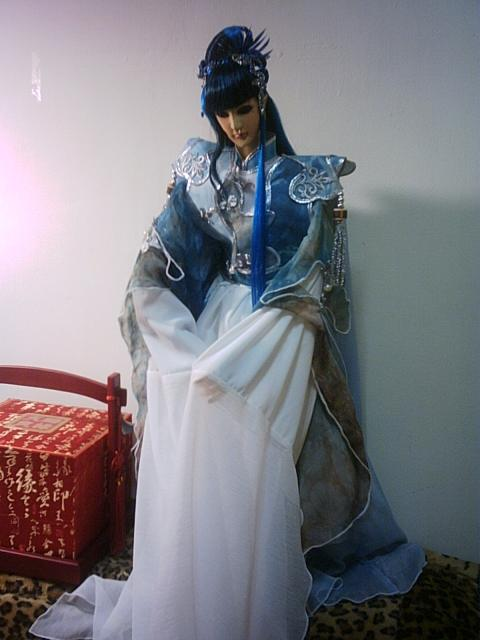
A modern style of puppet in Taiwan glove puppetry.

Glove puppetry (pò͘-tē-hì) performances, similar to some types of Chinese opera, are divided into a first half and a second half show. During the first half, known as the "show platform" (戲台), the audience is shown a demonstration by a master puppeteer on the stage. The second half consists of the puppet master, the orchestra, and the spoken parts. Several key points of a show to be appreciated include: the dexterity of the master puppeteer's manipulation of the puppet, the accompaniment of the orchestra, and the poetic spoken parts of the voice actors. With few exceptions, from traditional pò͘-tē-hì to modern performances, human vocal music and operatic singing is rarely heard.

== In Indonesia ==
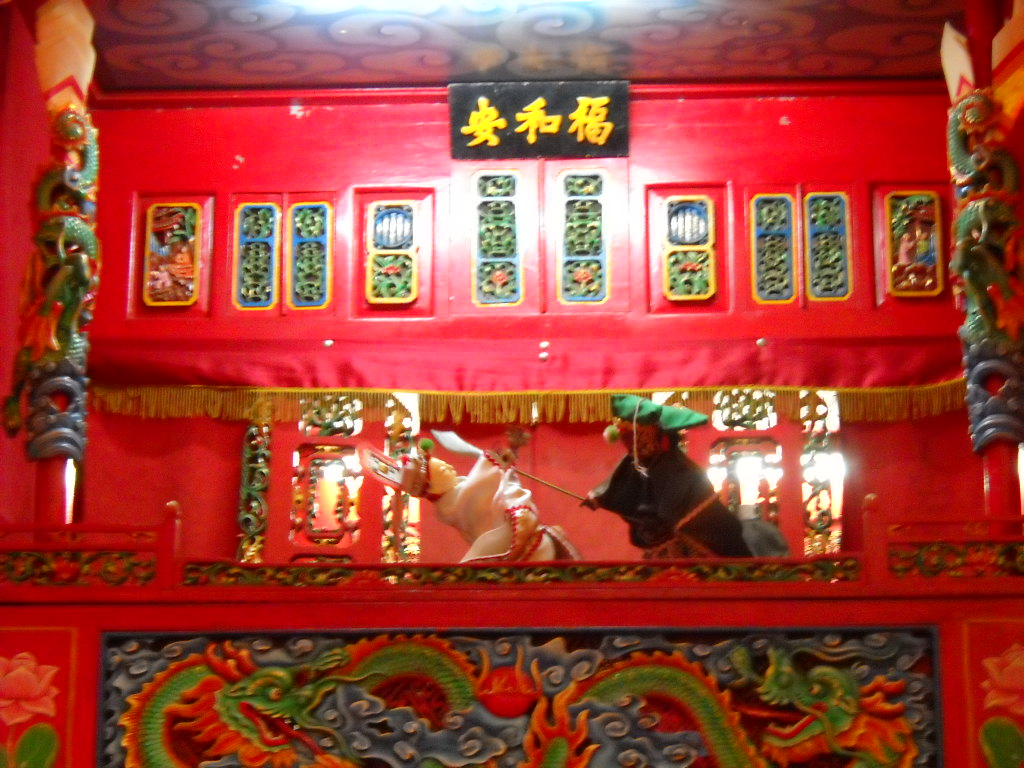
Wayang Potehi of Indonesia

In Indonesia, glove puppetry was popular within Chinese communities around Sumatra and Java. In Java, the interaction between Chinese and Javanese culture gave birth to new style of puppetry, called Peranakan Potehi. Today, glove puppetry is called with the term "Wayang Potehi" (Wayang means "puppet" in Javanese). The Wayang Potehi tradition is mainly preserved in Central Java (Semarang) and East Java's (Gudo, Jombang) Chinese communities. Most of the dialog parts of Wayang Potehi have been narrated using Indonesian and Javanese language.

== In Taiwan ==
In Taiwan Yunlin County is the center of glove puppetry with most major studios having a presence in the county.

Since 1984, Pili has been adding computer animations to their glove puppetry TV shows. Their shows continue to be popular, with the Thunderbolt Fantasy series being a collaboration with Gen Urobuchi that combines Pili style glove puppetry with anime style narrative.

== See also ==
- Chinese folk art
- Hand puppet
- Sooty
- Harry Corbett
- Thunderbolt Fantasy
