= Naz (studio) =

Japanese animation studio

Anima&Company Co., Ltd.
- Native name: 株式会社アニマ&カンパニー
- Romanized name: Kabushiki-gaisha Anima & Kanpanī
- Formerly: NAZ Co., Ltd.
- Type: Private KK
- Industry: Japanese animation
- Founder: Yasuo Suda
- Headquarters: Kamimeguro, Meguro, Tokyo, Japan
- Divisions: NAZ
- Website: www.animaand.co

NAZ
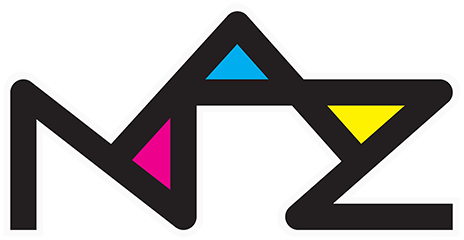
- Type: Division
- Industry: Japanese animation
- Founded: April 19, 2013; 13 years ago
- Headquarters: Nakamachi, Musashino, Tokyo, Japan
- Key people: Yasuo Suda (CEO)
- Parent: Anima&Co.
- Website: www.naz.co.jp

NAZ Co., Ltd. (Japanese: 株式会社NAZ, Hepburn: Kabushiki-gaisha Nazu) is a Japanese animation studio located in Musashino, Tokyo. It animated the first season of Hamatora, as well as adapting Nitro+chiral's visual novel Dramatical Murder into an anime series.

== Works ==
=== Television series ===
Title	Director(s)	First run start date	First run end date	Eps	Note(s)
Hamatora: The Animation	Seiji Kishi (Note: Credited as Chief Director (総監督, Sō Kantoku)); Hiroshi Kimura	January 8, 2014	March 26, 2014	12	A part of the Hamatora multimedia project.
DRAMAtical Murder	Kazuya Miura	July 6, 2014	September 21, 2014	12	Based on a BL visual novel by Nitro+chiral.
My First Girlfriend Is a Gal	Hiroyuki Furukawa	July 12, 2017	September 13, 2017	10	Adaptation of a manga series written by Meguru Ueno.
Angolmois: Record of Mongol Invasion	Takayuki Kuriyama	July 11, 2018	September 26, 2018	12	Adaptation of a manga series written by Nanahiko Takagi.
My Sister, My Writer	Hiroyuki Furukawa	October 10, 2018	December 19, 2018	10	Adaptation of a light novel series written by Seiji Ebisu. Co-produced with Magia Doraglier.
Id:Invaded	Ei Aoki	January 5, 2020	March 22, 2020	13	Original work.
Infinite Dendrogram	Tomoki Kobayashi	January 9, 2020	April 16, 2020	13	Adaptation of a light novel series written by Sakon Kaidō.
Gloomy the Naughty Grizzly	Takehiro Kubota	April 12, 2021	June 28, 2021	12	Original work.
Lucifer and the Biscuit Hammer	Nobuaki Nakanishi	July 9, 2022	December 24, 2022	24	Adaptation of a manga series written by Satoshi Mizukami.
Easygoing Territory Defense by the Optimistic Lord	Takayuki Kuriyama (Note: Credited as Series Director (シリーズディレクター, Shirīzu Direkutā)); Tetsuya Tatamitani	January 10, 2026	March 28, 2026	12	Adaptation of a light novel series written by Sou Akaike.
Special Kid Factory	Atsushi Ikariya	TBA	TBA	TBA	Original work.

=== ONAs ===
Title	Director(s)	First run start date	First run end date	Eps	Note(s)
Id:Indeed	Ei Aoki (chief); Atsushi Ikariya	January 8, 2021	March 26, 2021	12	Comedic spin-off of Id:Invaded
Thermae Romae Novae	Tetsuya Tatamitani	March 28, 2022	March 28, 2022	11	Adaptation of a manga series written by Mari Yamazaki.
Good Night World	Katsuya Kikuchi	October 12, 2023	October 12, 2023	12	Adaptation of a manga series written by Uru Okabe.
Garouden: The Way of the Lone Wolf	Atsushi Ikariya	May 23, 2024	May 23, 2024	8	Adaptation of a novel series written by Baku Yumemakura.
Dandelion	Daisuke Mataga	April 16, 2026	April 16, 2026	7	Adaptation of a one-shot manga written by Hideaki Sorachi.

=== OVAs ===
Title	Director(s)	Released	Eps	Note(s)
DRAMAtical Murder: Data_xx_Transitory	Kazuya Miura	December 24, 2014	1	
My First Girlfriend is a Gal: My First Cultural Fair	Hiroyuki Furukawa	December 26, 2017	1	
My Sister, My Writer: My Little Sister and I in a Virtual World	Hiroyuki Furukawa	February 27, 2019 – March 27, 2019	2	

=== Other projects ===
Title	Director(s)	Released	Note(s)
It Girl	Fantasista Utamaro	September 30, 2014	Music video based on the song by Pharrell Williams.
IDOLiSH7: MONSTER GENERATiON		July 23, 2015	Music video for the virtual idol group Idolish7.
Match Shoujo		February 10, 2016	Commercial promoting the Match Shoujo manga series by Sanami Suzuki.
TRIGGER: Leopard Eyes		December 16, 2015	Music video for the virtual idol group Trigger based on the Idolish7 mixed-media project.
Blood Lad: Kanketsu-hen		January 11, 2017	Commercial promoting the final volume of the Blood Lad manga series by Yūki Kodama.
Mr. Fixer	Takehiro Kubota	July 4, 2020	Music video for Mr. Fixer, the opening theme for Id:Invaded
