= Dramatical Murder =

2012 Japanese visual novel and its franchise

- Visual novel cover

ドラマティカル マーダー
- Genre: Science fiction; Yaoi
- Video game
- Developer: Nitro+chiral
- Publisher: Nitro+chiral
- Genre: BL game, visual novel
- Platform: PC
- Released: Windows: JP: March 23, 2012; NA: April 6, 2021
- Manga
- Written by: Nitro+chiral
- Illustrated by: Torao Asada
- Published by: Enterbrain
- Magazine: B's-Log Comic
- Original run: August 2012 – present
- Volumes: 2
- Video game

DRAMAtical Murder re:connect
- Developer: Nitro+chiral
- Publisher: Nitro+chiral
- Genre: BL game, visual novel
- Platform: PC
- Released: April 26, 2013
- Anime television series

DRAMAtical Murder
- Directed by: Kazuya Miura
- Produced by: Kazuhiro Asō; Yoshikazu Beniya; Hiroyuki Tanaka; Kozue Kaneniwa; Mika Shimizu; Tomohito Nagase; Kaho Yamada; Hirotaka Toda; Shun Arai
- Written by: Touko Machida; Kabura Fuchii
- Music by: Yuki Hayashi
- Studio: NAZ
- Licensed by: AUS: Madman Entertainment; NA: Sentai Filmworks; UK: Manga Entertainment
- Original network: TV Tokyo
- Original run: July 6, 2014 – September 21, 2014
- Episodes: 12 + OVA
- Video game

DRAMAtical Murder re:code
- Developer: Nitroplus
- Publisher: Nitroplus
- Released: PlayStation Vita: JP: October 30, 2014; Nintendo Switch: JP: December 25, 2025; Windows PC: JP: 2026
- icon

Dramatical Murder (ドラマティカル マーダー, Doramatikaru Mādā; stylized as DRAMAtical Murder) is a Japanese BL visual novel developed and published by Nitro+chiral. It was originally released on March 23, 2012, for Windows PCs as a first press edition, with a regular edition released on April 27, 2012. A fan disc follow-up titled Dramatical Murder re:connect, also for Windows PCs, was released on April 26, 2013, adding additional scenes, images and songs to the existing routes, as well as four new character routes to play through. On October 30, 2014, a version of the visual novel aimed at ages 15 and above titled Dramatical Murder re:code was released for the PlayStation Vita which removed the sex scenes, toned down the violence, and included an additional route for the character Mizuki.

An anime adaption by studio NAZ premiered on July 6, 2014. It is directed by Kazuya Miura, with Touko Machida and Kabura Fuchii handling series composition, Yukiko Ban designing the characters and Yuki Hayashi composing the music.

On July 4, 2018, it was announced at the Anime Expo that JAST USA's new JAST BLUE branch, which focuses on boys-love games, would release Nitro+CHiRAL's DRAMAtical Murder games and its other visual novel titles in English.

== Gameplay ==
Dramatical Murder is a science fiction and romance visual novel in which players assume the role of Aoba Seragaki. Much of its gameplay is spent reading the story's narrative and dialogue. Dramatical Murder follows a branching storyline with multiple endings. Depending on the decisions the player makes during the game, the plot will progress in different directions.

The game initially features four main plot lines, one for each of Aoba's potential suitors. Following the completion of all four, a fifth one is unlocked for Ren. Throughout gameplay, the player is given multiple options to choose from, and text progression pauses at these points until a choice is made. Each decision awards one point to Koujaku, Noiz, Clear or Mink respectively. The suitor who has amassed the largest number of points is the one whose plot line, "route", will be played.

Once a specific route has been entered, four more options are presented to the player at specific points in the story; depending on which options are picked, the story will end with either a good or bad ending.

== Plot ==
=== Setting ===
Dramatical Murder is set in the near future on the fictional island of Midorijima (碧島), Japan. At some point in the game's recent history, the island was privatized by the powerful Toue Konzern (東江コンツェルン, Tōe Kontserun) and turned into a resort called Platinum Jail (プラチナ・ジェイル, Purachina Jeiru), with the island's original residents being forced to live in the Old Residential District (旧住民区, Kyū-Jūmin-ku). Protagonist Aoba Seragaki lives on the island and works at a store named Junk Shop Mediocrity (平凡, Heibon), hoping to live a simple life. However, after being forcefully dragged into the popular cyber game Rhyme (ライム, Raimu) with its virtual world and its use of Allmates (オールメイト, Ōru Meito), mobile devices that usually appear as if they are the owner's pets, and hearing rumors about disappearances involving Ribsteez (リブスティーズ, Ribusutīzu), turf wars between groups, all semblance of a peaceful life for Aoba ends.

=== Characters ===
==== Main characters ====
- Aoba Seragaki (瀬良垣 蒼葉, Seragaki Aoba) is the primary protagonist of the game. He is 23 years old, and works part-time at a junk shop called Hum-Drum Junk, and lives with his grandmother, Tae. Aoba has a special ability called Scrap, which allows him to mix his consciousness with other people's through his voice and use it to control them, though he can also destroy them and leave the victims in a comatose-like state. Aoba has a caring, honest, and open-minded personality, but is noted by Ren to have a short temper. Inside of Aoba lies another personality that represents Scrap, who usually comes out whenever Aoba is emotionally distressed. The "other Aoba" desires chaos and destruction, and has shown to be sadistic and masochistic. That's why he is Aoba's desire. In Aoba's teenage years, the “other Aoba” was a prominent Rhyme player known by the alias Sly Blue.
- Ren (蓮, Ren) is Aoba's Allmate, who resembles a dark blue Japanese Spitz. He takes a human form in Rhyme. Ren has a mature, patient, and pragmatic demeanor. Despite being an older Allmate model, Aoba considers Ren to be his important partner and cherishes him like family. Originally, Ren was a part of Aoba's consciousness that was created to keep the balance between Aoba and his other personality that wishes for destruction. That's why he is Aoba's restraint. He is voiced by Ryōta Takeuchi.
- Koujaku (紅雀, Kōjaku) is Aoba's childhood friend, and the leader of a Ribsteez group named Benishigure. He is 27 years old, has many tattoos and scars on his body, and works as a hairdresser. Koujaku is compassionate and strong-willed, and he cares deeply for his loved ones. He was the illegitimate son of a yakuza leader and was the only heir, causing him and his mother to leave Midorijima when he was young. After undergoing a painful tattooing process, Koujaku was taken over by his tattoos' special effects and mindlessly killed his family. Despite his dark past, he retains a positive and gentle personality. Koujaku is a bit of a womanizer, and is incredibly popular with girls.
- Noiz (ノイズ, Noizu), real name Wilhelm (ウィルヘルム, Uiruherumu), is an information broker for Rhyme, a skilled hacker, and the founder of his Rhyme group, Ruff Rabbit. He is the youngest main character at 19 years old. Since he was a child, Noiz suffers from CIPA, causing him to accidentally hurt others. His wealthy parents regarded him as a disgrace and imprisoned him in his room for years until he ran away from his home in Germany. Due to this, Noiz is apathetic to the world around him and bases everything on cold logic, though he can be immature. His inability to feel pain also causes him to be reckless, and he eventually turns to playing Rhyme aggressively in order to feel the illusion of pain. His body is covered with many piercings.
- Mink (ミンク, Minku) is the leader of Scratch, a Ribsteez group of former prison inmates. Mink hails from a Native American tribe that grew special herbs that affect a human's body odor to give them a sense of peace. Toue, who mistook the purpose of the plant's effect as mind manipulation, slaughtered Mink's tribe, his family and friends, along with burning down his village in his attempts to obtain them, and Mink was captured along with several survivors and brought to Midorijima to be experimented on. Mink broke out and began plotting his revenge on Toue for his people's massacre. As a result, Mink emotionally hardened and distanced himself from personal attachments. He has a stoic, ruthless, controlling personality, constantly using violence as a means to reach his goal. Despite his rough exterior, he does have integrity and a gentle side he rarely shows.
- Clear (クリア, Kuria) is an android that previously served under Toue as a prototype for Scrap before being discarded. Clear was saved by a man who was in charge of the disposal, who treated Clear like a son until he died. Clear addresses this man as his grandfather and speaks about him fondly to Aoba. He refers to Aoba as his "Master", whom he is always eager to please. Although cheerful, polite, and kind, Clear is childish and his eccentric antics cause others not to take him seriously and be annoyed by him. He is almost always seen holding his vinyl umbrella and owns two masks to hide his face, one is a black gas mask and the other is a mask depicting a traditional Japanese woman, though he wears it as a joke. Clear enjoys singing, and can often be heard singing a song called the "Jellyfish Song". He is voiced by Masatomo Nakazawa.

==== Supporting characters ====
- Mizuki (ミズキ) is the leader of the Ribsteez team Dry Juice, owner of a tattoo shop called Black Needle and he is 26 years old. Mizuki and Aoba met and became friends when Aoba was a teenager in high school. Mizuki has a cool and friendly personality, and he treats his team members as family. Despite being the leaders of different Ribsteez teams, he is also good friends with Koujaku; he also has an unknown Allmate who takes the form of a white stoat. He is voiced by Kenji Takahashi. In the English dub of the anime, he is voiced by Adam Gibbs.
- Tae (タエ) is the grandmother of Aoba, whom she often scolds but deeply cares for. Years prior to the series, she worked as a neuroscientist for Toue, but quit upon learning that her research was being used for illegal experimentation. As a pharmacist, she prescribes medicine for Aoba to ease his headaches. She is voiced by Fuzuki Kun. In the English dub of the anime, she is voiced by Marcy Bannor.
- Nine (ナイン, Nain) is Aoba's adoptive father and Haruka's husband. Mysterious and quite whimsical, he was once Toue's experiment subject and apparently hears "voices" of things. He travels frequently as a result and came across Aoba during one of his journeys, and could sense Aoba was special. Nine and Haruka left Aoba with Tae to go on another journey when he was a child, and they have not been heard from since then. He is voiced by Eiji Takemoto.
- Haruka (ハルカ) is Aoba's adoptive mother and Nine's wife. She and Tae are distant relatives; the latter took her in after she ran away from her abusive parents. Despite her terrible childhood, Haruka's love for Nine and her family makes her a cheerful and kind person. Nine and Haruka left Aoba with Tae to go on another journey when he was a child, and they have not been heard from since then. She is voiced by Emi Motoi.
- Tatsuo Toue (東江 達夫, Tōe Tatsuo) is the owner of Platinum Jail, and the main antagonist of the game. Toue is loved by the citizens of Platinum Jail, but is despised by the citizens in the Old Residential District. Ostensibly, he is known as a calm and idealistic man who desires peace and happiness for mankind. However, he is truly a manipulative and self-righteous individual, justifying his horrendous crimes to achieve his goals by claiming it was for the greater good. He is also a fatalist, and merely sees life, including his own, as a game. He is voiced by Tadahisa Saizen. In the English dub of the anime, he is voiced by John Gremillion.
- Virus (ウイルス, Uirusu) and Trip (トリップ, Torippu) are acquaintances of Aoba who work for the yakuza and leaders of the group, Morphine. They are often mistaken for twins due to their similar appearances. They became Aoba's "fans" after witnessing him play Rhyme in the past and will occasionally act as allies to him. In actuality, they are two-faced, and are simply looking out for their own self-interests. They are voiced by Junji Majima and Tomoyuki Higuchi, respectively. In the English dub of the anime, they are both voiced by Doug Hammond and Blake Shepard.
- Sei (セイ) is Aoba's older twin brother that is held captive by Toue. He also has the ability of Scrap, but the power lies in his eyes. Sei wishes for Aoba to kill him in order to be released from his suffering after years of being subjected to Toue's experiments, which resulted in Sei becoming sickly and on the verge of death by the beginning of the game. Initially appearing as emotionless, Sei is soft-spoken and kind, and he cares deeply for his brother Aoba and Ren, wishing for their happiness. In spite of Toue's horrifying experiments to his being, Sei states that he does not resent Toue for all that he is done, but does feel responsible to stop him from causing more harm. He is voiced by Yūichi Iguchi. In the English dub of the anime, he is voiced by Clint Bickham.
- Takahashi (高橋) is an assistant of Toue. He is voiced by Kishio Daisuke. In the English dub of the anime, he is voiced by Scotty Fults.
- Yoshie (吉江) is the owner of Delivery Works, a local courier shop. She takes rumors very seriously, such as all the exaggerated talk about Scratch and the Northern District. When Aoba could not remember what TV drama Yoshie was ranting to him about, she got incredibly upset and began to fawn over one of the actors in it, much to Aoba's discomfort. Despite this, she is shown to be very kind but also unaware that she makes Aoba uncomfortable most of the time with her bantering. She also seems to be interested in younger men, as a poster is hung in her workplace, reading that only young men should apply, and she is overly-affectionate towards Aoba. She is voiced by Satosaki Ume. In the English dub version, she is voiced by Allison Sumrall.
- Haga (羽賀) is the owner of the Junk Shop Mediocrity where Aoba works. He is a kind and considerate man, only losing his temper when being called "baldy" by Kio, Nao, and Mio. His Allmate is Bonjin-kun. He is voiced by Eiichirou Tokumoto. In the English dub of the anime, he is voiced by Rutherford Cravens.
- Kio Kuniyashi (国芳 キオ, Kuniyashi Kio) , Mio Kuniyashi (国芳 ミオ, Kuniyashi Mio) , Nao Kuniyashi (国芳 ナオ, Kuniyashi Nao) are three elementary school-age kids that are often seen hanging around the junk shop that Aoba works at. Kio is voiced by Saki Umesato in the Japanese dub and Kalin Coates in the English dub. Mio is voiced by Emi Motoi in the Japanese dub and Jane Cash in the English dub. Nao is voiced by Megumi Matsumoto in the Japanese dub and Cayla Coats in the English dub.
- Akushima (悪島) is the head of the corrupted Midorijima police (primarily in the Old Resident District), and is usually seen giving orders to other officers. He has a very loud exterior, almost never lowering his voice and always yelling to get his point across. In addition, he has a habit of elongating his words for no apparent reason, much like Trip. He takes great pleasure in arresting people who participate in Rhyme or those he sees as terrorists in his eyes (i.e. Aoba and his friends). He enforces taking violent and drastic measures to capture criminals, usually not caring whether they are dead or alive. Trip and Virus seem to be familiar with Akushima and his police force due to being in the yakuza, hinting they may have had past encounters. He is voiced by Yasunori Masutani. In the English dub he is voiced by Mark Laskowski.
- Alphas are androids created by Toue to control people by playing the "Dye Music". They are usually seen wearing solid white masks. Two of them (that where shown in the series), share exactly the same appearance as their "brother" Clear. The two androids are voiced by Hiroshi Okamoto and Kaito Ishikawa respectively. In the English dub, the two androids are both voiced by Greg Ayres.
- Ryuuhou is a sadistic tattoo artist, who has a connection to Koujaku's past. It is implied that he has been working as one for many years. His work is admired by many aspiring tattooists, often being highly detailed and containing smooth, intricate patterns. Underneath his warm smile, Ryuuhou is shown to be very manipulative and sadistic, drugging Aoba and nearly forcing him into getting tattooed. He enjoys seeing others writhe in pain under him, lovingly going on about how much more beautiful a person becomes after being touched by his needle. His love and obsession towards body art takes a disturbing turn when Koujaku's own tattoos begin to flourish and take control of his mind and anger. The sight of his art turning Koujaku into a monster puts Ryuuhou into such a state of ecstasy that he welcomes his death with open arms, barely choking out how good it feels to be killed by his own creation. He is voiced by Akira Sasanuma. In the English dub he is voiced by Chris Patton.
- Theodore (セオドア, Seodoa), commonly known as Theo (テオ, Teo) for short, is Noiz's younger brother who appears exclusively in DRAMAtical Murder Drama CD Vol. 4 – Noiz, though he was mentioned by Noiz in the first DRAMAtical Murder game and its sequel DRAMAtical Murder: re:connect. Born two years after Noiz, Theo loves him deeply and was the only one in their family who tried to reach out to Noiz during their childhood. However, as Noiz was imprisoned in his room to prevent him from accidentally harming those around him, their parents forbid Theo from having contact with his older brother, much to both of their dismay. As such, Noiz does not resent his brother and treats him with kindness. After Noiz ran away to Japan, his family spent years searching for him while their father trained Theo to become the successor to their family company, and Theo was delighted to take his brother on as his assistant after Noiz's return. Theo bears a striking resemblance to Noiz to the point that Aoba mistakes him for the latter twice. As he was pampered by their parents as a child, Theo is bright, honest, polite, and hard-working, though he tends to get nervous easily. He is voiced by Sōma Saitō.

==== AllMates ====
- Beni (べに) is Koujaku's Allmate. Beni takes the form of a red sparrow. He wears a beaded necklace and a pair of getas on his feet. While initially the tiniest out of all the Allmates, he has a large temper to make up for it. He has a no-nonsense policy and is shown to be quick to react to tough situations, similar to Koujaku. Despite that, Beni can be very relaxed and shows to care about other's well-being. Girls particularly find him cute and will call him as such when they are around Koujaku (unlike his owner he will simply take the compliments instead of gloating about it). He is voiced by Keisuke Goto. In the English dub of the anime, he is voiced by Kyle Jones.
- Tori/Huracan (トリ / ルラカン) is Mink's Allmate. Tori takes the form of a light pink Major Mitchell's Cockatoo. Tori wears an eyepatch that covers his left eye, Native American jewelry, and is often shown to hold a cigar in his beak. Just like his owner Mink, Tori is usually very quiet and only speaks when he needs to inform someone of something or during an emergency. Tori often talks in a calm, formal, and collected manner, almost never raising his voice even in times of discord. Beni and Tori have been shown to not get along from the moment they both met since Tori often insults Beni and mocks his attitude and manner of speaking, causing Beni to fly into a rage and further prove Tori right by calling him rude names. Although Beni is hot-headed whenever Tori is around, the latter tends to be calm and collected. They are usually shown together in official group shots where Koujaku and Mink are present, both usually glaring or squacking at one another. He is voiced by Hitoshi Bifu. In the English dub of the anime, he is voiced by Stephen E. Moellering.
- Midori (緑) (Note: Noiz's Allmate is credited with its official name in the anime.) is Noiz's Allmate, taking the form of multiple, small pixelized rabbit cubes that Noiz connects to his waistband like chains and hangs over the sides of his hips. When in Rhyme, Midori has two forms, one being the head rabbit that wears an outfit that is very similar to his owner's and gives out orders, and the other being numerous rabbits with red boxing gloves and matching tennis shoes that do combat. Similar to Huracan, Midori did not have a real name, as Noiz views his Allmate as a machine made to carry out his orders and was simply known as Pseudo Rabbit (ウサギモドキ Usagimodoki). However, in DRAMAtical Murder Drama CD Vol. 4 – Noiz, Aoba suggests that Noiz gives his Allmate a proper name and pitches the name "Midori" due to its green coloring and it sounds similar to Midorijima. Although Noiz was more indifferent to the name, his Allmate happily accepted it. Midori has an excitable personality, and displays great confidence during Rhyme battles. Usagimodoki's gender is unknown. Usagimodoki is voiced by Hiroko Miyamoto. In the English dub of the anime series, Usagimodoki is voiced by Tiffany Grant.
- Usui (卯水) is Toue's Allmate and the judge for Rhyme. She is one of the Allmates that comes in a humanoid form. She has ten arms and a small body frame. She has long, light blue-green hair that is kept up by two pigtails in the back with fringes in the front. When hosting Rhyme, Usui wears a simple blue dress with white gloves and shoes. She also wears a blue transparent visor that covers her face and often carries a microphone. In her true form, her hair is much longer and it becomes heavily covered in extravagant jewelry on her arms, torso and lower body. Despite her feminine appearance, Usui's most noticeable asset is her surprisingly deep, masculine voice, which is also noted by Aoba. Usui does not show much emotion or personality throughout the game. While hosting Rhyme, she is straightforward and enjoys getting the crowd riled up for the matches. Her voice is usually calm yet powerful and her expression is soft. However, during her fight with Ren and Aoba, she is shown to be very malicious and powerful. Usui wears a smirk and her eyes are wide open, having a crazed-like spark to them as she takes little damage and attacks without mercy. She is voiced by Tsuguo Mogami. In the English dub of the anime series, Usui is voiced by Clint Bickham.
- Hersha (ヘルシャ) is Virus's Allmate. Hersha takes the form of a black anaconda.
- Welter (ヴェルター) is Trip's Allmate. Welter takes the form of a giant black lion.
- Clara (クララ) is Yoshie's Allmate. She takes the form of a Maltese breed of a dog. She has thick eyelashes, light brown fur, a white pearled necklace, and a frilly light purple hair bow on top of her head. She will often stop Aoba in his tracks just for a chance to see Ren and ask how he is doing. Yoshie finds her and Ren's "friendship" to be adorable while Aoba and Ren are often exhausted by the advances and turned off completely by them. She is voiced by Aya Kuyama.
- Bonjin (凡人君) is Haga's Allmate. It takes the form of a futuristic robot. Bonjin is voiced by Inchiki Echigoya. In the English dub, Bonjin is voiced by Christopher Ayres.

== Development ==
=== Release history ===
Dramatical Murder was originally released as an adult game on March 23, 2012, playable on Windows PCs as either a digital download or DVD. On April 26, 2013, a fan disc called Dramatical Murder re:connect was released; it included extra scenes, expanded upon the endings with scenes that take place before and after them, new CG images, songs and a minigame.

On October 30, 2014, a revised version titled Dramatical Murder re:code was released for PlayStation Vita in Japan. This version was aimed at ages 15 and above, removing explicit sex scenes, toning down violence, and adding a new character route not present in the original PC version.

A decade after its initial console debut, Dramatical Murder re:code was released on Nintendo Switch as a digital title on December 25, 2025.

== Related media ==
=== Drama CDs ===
Numerous drama CDs have been released; each one focuses on Aoba's relationship with one of his potential boyfriends and takes place after the events of the visual novel.

=== Manga ===
A manga adaption illustrated by Torao Asada began serialization in the August 2012 issue of Enterbrain's B's-Log Comic magazine. The first tankōbon volume was released on April 1, 2013. An official anthology volume for the series was released on June 30, 2012.

=== Anime ===
The anime was announced to air in summer 2014. The anime aired on July 6, 2014, and ended on September 21, 2014, and was streamed on Crunchyroll.

A DVD/Blu-ray was released on December 24, 2014, with all twelve episodes. Along with an original soundtrack and a drama CD titled Welcome to Dramatical Tea Shop Cyan Moon (ドラマティカル喫茶 ・ シアンムーンへようこそ, Dramatical Kissa Cyan Moon he Yōkoso), a special OVA called Data_xx_Transitory, which features the bad endings of the game, was included. On September 21, 2014, following the airing of the final episode, the official anime website announced that there will be a live reading event on February 1, 2015, titled Data_12.5_Recitation. Atsushi Kisaichi, Ryōta Takeuchi, Hiroki Takahashi, Satoshi Hino, Kenichirou Matsuda, Masatomo Nakazawa, and Yūichi Iguchi have been confirmed to be attending.

On June 21, 2015, Madman Entertainment announced at the Supanova Pop Culture Expo that it has licensed the series for Australian and New Zealand release. On July 16, 2015, Sentai Filmworks announced the license to the series for North American release in English on DVD and Blu-ray on November 24, 2015.

=== Stage ===
A theatrical adaptation of the game was announced in September 2019. Sei'ichirō Nagata was cast as Aoba, Allen Kohatsu as Koujaku, Rikiya Tomizono as Noiz, Yūki Yamagata as Clear, Takanori Yamaki as Mink, Shōgō Yamazaki as Ren and Sei, Yūya Tominaga as Virus, Yū Yoshioka as Trip, Naoya Iwaki as Mizuki, and Hayato Moriya as Akushima.

== Reception ==
Dramatical Murder ranked third in Rice Digital's list of "Top 10 English Yaoi Games" and the second highest Nitro+chiral visual novel, following Togainu no Chi. The review states: "everything about DRAMAtical Murder is bizarre, but it makes for a very interesting game".

As of October 2024, Twitch prohibits livestreaming the game.
