= Chax =

Chax may refer to:

- A guy named Awais Bhai
- A Great Marquis of Hell, also spelled Shax
- A line of Japanese products designed by Mori Chack
- A free, third-party add-on for iChat
