= Gloomy =

Gloomy can refer to:

- melancholia
- The song Gloomy Sunday
- The song Gloomy from the self-titled album Creedence Clearwater Revival
- The Gloomy Dean, nickname of William Ralph Inge
- Gloomy Bear, a fictional character
- Gloomy Galleon
- Someone who is easily saddened or depressed
