= My Sister, My Writer =

Japanese light novel series and its adaptations

- The cover of the first light novel, featuring Suzuka Nagami

俺が好きなのは妹だけど妹じゃない (Ore ga Suki nano wa Imōto dakedo Imōto ja nai)
- Genre: Romantic comedy
- Light novel
- Written by: Seiji Ebisu
- Illustrated by: Gintarō
- Published by: Fujimi Shobo
- Imprint: Fujimi Fantasia Bunko
- Original run: August 20, 2016 – March 19, 2020
- Volumes: 11
- Manga
- Illustrated by: Kō Narita
- Published by: Fujimi Shobo
- Magazine: Monthly Dragon Age
- Original run: December 9, 2017 – September 9, 2019
- Volumes: 4
- Anime television series
- Directed by: Hiroyuki Furukawa
- Produced by: Noritomo Isogai; Yūta Kashiwabara; Jōtarō Ishigami; Satoru Shimosato; Daisikue Iwasaki; Sōjirō Arimizu; Masanori Kajiura; Kaori Kimura
- Written by: Yūichirō Momose
- Music by: Yashikin
- Studio: NAZ; Magia Doraglier
- Original network: AT-X, Tokyo MX, SUN, KBS, TVA, TVQ, BS11
- Original run: October 10, 2018 – December 19, 2018
- Episodes: 10 + 2 OVAs

My Sister, My Writer, known in Japan as Ore ga Suki nano wa Imōto dakedo Imōto ja nai (俺が好きなのは妹だけど妹じゃない; lit. "The One Whom I Love Is My Little Sister But She's Not a Little Sister") and abbreviated as Imo-Imo, is a Japanese light novel series written by Seiji Ebisu and illustrated by Gintarō. A manga adaptation by Kō Narita launched in Monthly Dragon Age from December 2017 to September 2019, and an anime television series adaptation by NAZ and Magia Doraglier aired from October to December 2018.

== Plot ==
Suzuka Nagami is a beautiful third-year student who excels in her academics. One day, a novel written by her wins a light novel award which is based on a little sister who dotes on her brother. Suzuka decides to give all the credits to her brother Yū Nagami under the pen name Chikai Towano due to her student council president position and their strict father. Suzuka and Yū join a fan service to make progress for her novel, but Suzuka begins to harbor real, forbidden feelings for her brother.

== Characters ==
Yū Nagami (永見祐, Nagami Yū)
Voiced by: Tasuku Hatanaka
Suzuka's elder brother. He is a first-year high school student. In his middle school, he became an otaku after reading light novels. Later on, he becomes an author with the pen name Chikai Towano. Compared to his successful sister, Yū is a talentless and an average student. He thinks that he is an untrustworthy brother and mistakenly believes that Suzuka hates him because she is always rude towards him. Deep down inside he cares for his sister, and he has never experienced the feeling of protectiveness and affection (young sister moe) for his sister.
Suzuka Nagami (永見涼花, Nagami Suzuka)
Voiced by: Reina Kondō
Yū's sister is an extreme beauty and is perfect in everything she does. Unlike her brother, Suzuka is very popular in school, where she is the student council president. She always tries to become a reliable person, even to Yū. Nobody knows that she is crazy about her brother. When she suddenly desires to write a novel entitled The Story of a Little Sister Who Loves Her Big Brother so Much It Causes Trouble, she asked her brother to become a writer using a false name after she wins an award. Later in the series, after graduating, she enrolls in Yū's school.
Mai Himuro (氷室 舞, Himuro Mai)
Voiced by: Yui Ogura
Yū's classmate who is a proud writer and beautiful inside and out. Yū is unaware that Mai is the light novel writer whom he praises so much, and is a huge fan of Chikai Towano. She personally meets Yū and tries to find out the secret behind his "talent".
Ahegao W Peace Sensei (アヘ顔Wピース先生)
Voiced by: Chinatsu Akasaki
An illustrator from the United Kingdom. Ahegao is a cheerful four-eyed girl with big breasts. She never leaves a chance to make sexual references and loves sexually explicit things. Her favorite one is sadism, which means deriving pleasure from humiliating others. Her pen name is derived from a sensual facial expression usually seen in pornography in the manga.
Sakura Minazuki (水無月 桜, Minazuki Sakura)
Voiced by: Kazusa Aranami
A professional voice actress who won who was selected in her first audition. Sakura does not have any weak points and can perform in any kind of role. She aspires to become the voice actress for a little sister character, and is also a great fan of Chikai Towano's writing. Even though Yū is younger than her, she loves to pretend to be his little sister and nicknames him as "Onii-chan".
Reika Shinozaki (篠崎麗華, Shinozaki Reika)
Voiced by: Eri Kitamura
Esaka (江坂さん)
Voiced by: Ayumi Mano
Haruna Kanzaka (神坂 春奈, Kanzaka Haruna)
Voiced by: Yua Nagae
Akino Kanzaka (神坂 秋乃, Kanzaka Akino)
Voiced by: Yui Nakajima

== Media ==
=== Light novels ===
Seiji Ebisu published the first volume of the light novels, with illustrations by Gintarō, in 2016. The series is published by Fujimi Shobo under their Fujimi Fantasia Bunko imprint.

No.	Japanese release date	Japanese ISBN
1	August 20, 2016	978-4-04-072033-3
2	December 20, 2016	978-4-04-072034-0
3	April 20, 2017	978-4-04-072271-9
4	August 19, 2017	978-4-04-072272-6
5	December 20, 2017	978-4-04-072557-4
6	April 20, 2018	978-4-04-072558-1
7	August 18, 2018	978-4-04-072862-9
7.5	October 20, 2018	978-4-04-072865-0
8	December 20, 2018	978-4-04-072863-6
8.5	June 20, 2019	978-4-04-073215-2
9	September 20, 2019	978-4-04-073218-3
10	December 20, 2019	978-4-04-073219-0
11	March 19, 2020	978-4-04-073220-6

=== Manga ===
A manga adaptation with art by Kō Narita began serialization in Fujimi Shobo's shōnen manga magazine Monthly Dragon Age magazine on December 9, 2017. The manga ended on September 9, 2019. The fourth and final volume was released on December 20, 2019.

No.	Japanese release date	Japanese ISBN
1	August 18, 2018	978-4-04-072836-0
2	October 20, 2018	978-4-04-072910-7
3	May 9, 2019	978-4-04-073155-1
4	December 20, 2019	978-4-04-073420-0

=== Anime ===
An anime television series adaptation aired from October 10 to December 19, 2018, on AT-X, Tokyo MX and other channels. The series was directed by Hiroyuki Furukawa, who also adapted Gintarō's original character designs. Yūichirō Momose handled series composition, Kisuke Koizumi was the sound director, and Yashikin composed the music. The series was animated by studio NAZ and Furukawa's own newly established Magia Doraglier. The opening theme is "Secret Story" by Purely Monster. The series ran for 10 episodes.

No.	Title	Original release date
1	"How my Sister and I Became Light Novel Authors" "Ore to Imōto ga Ranobe Sakka ni Natta Riyū" (俺と妹がラノベ作家になった理由)	October 10, 2018
Yu Nagami, who dreams to be an author, has been submitting stories to competitions but is told his female characters lack appeal and should write a sister character. His co-worker Esaka suggests he use Suzuka as inspiration, which he rejects before purchasing the latest novel of his favorite author Enryuu Homura. Checking the competition again, Yu sees the winner was Chikai Towano with a novel about a sister who loves her brother. Suzuka blurts out that Chikai Towano is her pen name but is quick to point out the story is not based on her real feelings. Yu is depressed Suzuka won her first competition without effort. As her novel will now be professionally published she begs Yu to pretend to be Chikai Towano as her school forbids student from having jobs, plus their father is strict. Yu agrees until he succeeds at publishing his own novel. At the award ceremony, he meets Reika Shinozaki, his assigned editor who is unconventional, and Ahegao W Peace, his assigned illustrator who is busty and perverted. In private, Suzuka reveals she actually is in love with Yu and considers publishing her novel as the first step towards marrying him.
2	"My Little Sister Aims for the Greatest Heights" "Ore no Imōto wa Doko Demo Takami o Mezasunda" (俺の妹はどこでも高みを目指すんだ)	October 17, 2018
Yu is confronted by Mai Himuro, the schools unapproachable beauty, who was at the award ceremony and knows he is Chikao Towano. Mai also reveals she is secretly his favourite author Enryuu Homura. Mai admits she loved his novel and, wishing to learn how he wrote it, demands access to his private life to study him. Visiting his home she takes photographs and snoops through his possessions. Suzuka tries to scare Mai away by claiming Yu is a pervert, though Mai claims she would be a willing victim if it improved her writing. Yu finally forces Mai to leave. Desperate to keep Yu to herself Suzuka invites him on a date, claiming she needs inspiration for part 2 of her novel. While dressing for the date Yu sees Suzuka in her underwear. First they visit a book store where Suzuka sees just how popular her novel is. They mistakenly enter an eroge store where Ahegao herself is present. Ahegao is delighted at Yu's claim they are researching erotic material for the next novel. She shows them some of her doujinshi artwork which is more lewd than anything Suzuka has seen before and she passes out imagining doing such things with Yu. At home Suzuka is determined to outdo Mai and Ahegao, believing they are trying to seduce Yu with their larger breasts.
3	"My Little Sister and I Are Light Novel Authors Together" "Ore to Imōto wa Nī de Hitori no Ranobe Sakkada" (俺と妹はニ人で一人のラノベ作家だ)	October 24, 2018
Reika asks that the next novel include a second female heroine and more fan service, panty shots in particular. Yu is horrified to have to educate her on what an upskirt is. Suzuka admits she has no inspiration for the second female; when Yu also struggles, they are forced to summon Mai and Ahegao for help. Mai is disappointed a successful writer like Yu needs help but agrees with Ahegao that the second heroine should be a cute romantic rival. As payment Mai demands a detailed list of all Yu's sexual fetishes with Ahegao providing costumes to see which he likes most. Suzuka takes part and, based on Yu's reaction, is declared the winner in PE outfit with knee socks. Several days later Reika calls Yu, furious that he missed his deadline. Suzuka admits she does not want a second heroine and is upset Yu didn't seem to enjoy her first novel. Yu realises his jealousy of Suzuka's success has hurt her feelings. Reading her novel again, he realizes why her novel is so entertaining and demands Suzuka forget the second heroine as the sister is the only love interest needed. Ecstatic at his declaration of love for the sister, Suzuka writes the entire second novel in one night. Seeing Yu has fallen asleep, she takes the opportunity to secretly kiss him.
4	"I Just Wanted to Catch Up to My Little Sister, That's All" "Ore wa Tada, Imōto ni Oitsukitakatta Dakenanda" (俺はただ、妹に追いつきたかっただけなんだ)	October 31, 2018
Yu meets Sakura Minazuki, a famous voice actress who claims to be his biggest fan and considers it her dream to voice his little sister should his novel be made into an anime. She also begins calling him "big brother", making Suzuka furious Yu has met another big breasted girl. Reika later hints she is trying to arrange for an anime series to be produced. Getting nowhere with just following him Mai directly demands Yu's secret to entertaining writing, but he is unable to answer and avoids her. Mai successfully steals the novel Yu is currently writing and is disappointed by its poor writing and uninteresting characters, so much so she begins to doubt he is really Chikai Towano. Fearing she might be exposed as Chikai, Suzuka plans to let Yu flirt with her in front of Mai, convincing her that Yu must be Chikai due to having a real sister fetish. They go on a date, knowing Mai is following again, and while shopping Yu is forced to select new panties for Suzuka to buy. After other flirty activities Ahegao appears and insists everyone go shopping with her, including Mai and a passing Sakura, so that Yu can judge their new bikinis. Overwhelmed, Yu picks Suzuka's bikini as the best. Mai suggests they take a short beach holiday at her villa.
5	"I Love My Little Sister More Than Anything in the World" "Ore wa Imōto ga Sekai de Ichiban Daisukida" (俺は妹が世界で一番大好きだ)	November 7, 2018
At the villa Yu is suspicious and asks Mai about a meeting she had with her editor, but she avoids the topic. Ahegao suggests Yu apply sunscreen but Yu spills the bottle over Suzuka, who leaves to shower. Yu decides to use Mai's second shower, but picks the wrong room and sees Suzuka naked. Mai gets Yu alone and demands his secret to great writing, even offering sex. When he still resists she demands to personally watch him writing. Luckily, Suzuka had foreseen this and had Yu memorise her next chapter. As there are only four beds Suzuka insists on sharing with Yu. Unable to sleep, Yu goes to the front room and sees Mai who admits she has a new hyper-critical editor and her latest novels are less popular because of changes he made, so her novel might be cancelled. When he still will not reveal his secret she leaves crying. Yu demands to know how Suzuka writes and she admits she enters a state of mind where she becomes her main character. Yu attempts this with the brother from her story and tells Suzuka he loves her, causing her to faint. Yu passes the secret to Mai who is inspired and begins writing. Yu is also inspired to work on his own novel using Suzuka's method.
6	"Our Hakuou Girls' School Culture Festival" "Ore to Imōto no Shirazakura Jogakuin Bunkamatsuri" (俺と妹の白桜女学院文化祭)	November 14, 2018
Suzuka is ecstatic following Yu's love confession, then furious when he explains he was pretending to be the character. Suzuka and Yu sell Ahegao's doujinshi at a comic event and meet two sisters, author Haruna and illustrator Akino, who together produce the novel series Ambivalence. Haruna insults Chikai Towano's novel, causing Suzuka to reveal Yu is Chikai. Haruna suggests a competition; they will create doujinshi based on Chikai Towano's novel and see whose is better. Suzuka is angry that she demands if they win, they must acknowledge Chikai as an author, otherwise Chikai will retire. Ahegao agrees to help with the illustrations, but only if they pose for her new BDSM illustration, which causes Yu some anguish. For the doujinshi, Suzuka suggests the siblings flirt at a festival, and for research purposes, invites Yu to her own schools festival. At the festival two actors fall ill and Suzuka, as Student Council President, is asked to replace them, along with Yu, as a prince and princess. As the prince Yu manages to improvise rejecting the princess's love due to his confusion and asking for time to think. Until Akino appears, Suzuka personally wonders if those are Yu's real feelings towards her and almost confesses to him for real.
7	"My Sister and I Face a Doujinshi Contest We Can't Lose" "Ore to Imōto no Zettai ni Makenai Dōjinshi Kyohi" (俺と妹の絶対に負けられない同人誌対決)	November 28, 2018
Yu demands to know why Haruna and Akino are against Ahegao, and they claim it is because she is wasting her talent. Suzuka tries to write all night but comes down with fever. Yu takes care of her, including having to wash her body and pick clean underwear. Suzuka asks Yu to finish the doujinshi using their experiences so far. Yu attempts to write like Suzuka, but even he finds what he wrote boring with no appeal. Ahegao's artwork also drops in quality as she is not allowed to draw her usual lewd illustrations. Yu decides to write as though Suzuka was the intended reader and allows Ahegao to use her usual lewd art. At the contest Ahegao is surprised Haruna and Akino have also produced an erotic doujinshi. Many customers buy Ambivalence's doujinshi due to their existing fame, but Yu's sales soon increase after Sakura tweets about their doujinshi to her fans. Surprisingly, Akino insists Haruna ignore Ahegao's lewd illustrations and just read Yu's story. They lose the competition after readers prefer Yu's doujinshi and Haruna admits they struggled to write a good story so they tried to use lewd illustrations to increase the appeal, but Ahegao is still a better illustrator. Haruna apologises but insists she will be better than Ahegao one day. Suzuka takes the opportunity to read the story Yu wrote and yells at him for his perverted thoughts.
8	"About the Time I Got a New Little Sister" "Ore ni Atarashī Imōto ga Dekita Kudan ni Tsuite" (俺に新しく妹ができた件について)	December 5, 2018
Suzuka's novel is greenlit for an anime so Yu is asked to meet anime director Sakurada. Minazuki runs away from home and asks to move in with Yu. Mai phones Yu and realises Yu is with Minazuki and is furious. Akino and Haruna phone for advice on their new novel and also realise Yu is with a woman. Yu and Suzuka meet Sakurada, his boss Mitarai, and Reika. Sakurada is also a fan of little sisters but is disappointed at Yu's lack of "Little Sister Moe". Further disappointed Sakurada agrees to direct the anime but refuses to let Yu have any input and will instead reinterpret the little sister character as he sees fit. Suzuka is furious her characters will be altered and demands Yu undergo immediate training to discover his love of little sisters. Returning home they find Minazuki wearing only apron and panties. A furious Suzuka discovers Minazuki left home after an argument with her real older brother. Learning about Yu's training to love little sisters Minazuki offers her help, since she is also a little sister. Furious, Suzuka challenges Minazuki to a contest to see if a fake little sister is better than a real little sister to train Yu in Moe.
9	"Our Special Training at the Theme Park" "Ore to Imōto-tachi no Yuenchi Tokkun" (俺と妹たちの遊園地特訓)	December 12, 2018
Minazuki asks Yu to be on her radio show and he agrees, hoping it will convince Sakurada of his Moe so he spends the interview flirting with Suzuka. Returning home they find Ahegao and Mai who, after learning of his search for moe, also demand to become his little sisters, with Minazuki suggesting a group date. Akino and Haruna also join them on the date. By drawing lots to determine what kind of sister they will be Mai becomes a kuudere sister, Ahegao a lolicon sister, Haruna a tsundere, Akino a cat-themed yandere and Suzuka an overly affectionate dere-dere. Minazuki is harassed by a fan until Yu makes him leave. She asks why he needs to sister moe if he already wrote a popular novel and he explains his predicament with Sakurada. Minazuki confesses she always struggled to voice act sister characters as her real brother has an oppressive sister complex, but ever since reading Yu's novel she has learned to appreciate sister moe. Minazuki suddenly confesses her love to Yu which is overheard by Suzuka who runs away. Yu goes after her when Minazuki claims she was just acting and admits she has lost the little sister duel between her and Suzuka. However, after Yu leaves Minazuki is visibly saddened by Yu's rejection.
10	"I Can Find My Little Sister Moe" "Ore wa Imōto ni Moete Ii" (俺は妹に萌えていい)	December 19, 2018
Suzuka is distraught. Yu realises he always had Little Sister Moe but was afraid. Locating Suzuka he explains what really happened and admits the very first light novel he read was a little sister love story, but was afraid Suzuka would find him creepy if he told her. Suzuka is overjoyed to finally know Yu's true feelings. Minazuki is surprised to hear Sakurada is directing the anime and decides to return home. At the meeting, Yu declares Sakurada is the one who lacks Moe as he only focuses on how he feels for the sister character, but disregards how the sister might feel, so what Sakurada has is just lust and not Moe. Furious, Sakurada decides to change the characters from pure spite but Minazuki arrives and reveals Sakurada is actually her brother with the overbearing sister complex, and forces him to admit he had a grudge against Yu for letting Minazuki live with him temporarily. Sakurada apologises and agrees not to alter the characters and praises Yu as the king of Little Sister Moe. As Yu and all the girls celebrate his victory Suzuka accepts Yu might not love her in a romantic way, but at least loves little sisters. As summer break ends Suzuka graduates and enters the same high school as Yu.
OVA–1	"My Little Sister And I In A Virtual World, Part 1" "Kasō Sekai no Imōto to Boku Sono 1" (仮想世界の妹と僕 その1)	December 26, 2018
Ahegao reveals her company has developed a full dive virtual reality console called Nerd Gear and offers to let Yu, Suzuka, Mai, Minazuki, Haruna and Akino try it out. Unfortunately, once inside the game Ahegao reveals it is a hentai netorare, meaning the girls must defeat each other to seduce Yu during erotic scenarios. Ahegao is designated Yu's wife and the other girls must seduce him for themselves. Ahegao attempts to sleep with Yu on their wedding night but Mai plays a jealous mistress card, forcing Ahegao to divorce Yu. Mai attempts to become pregnant with Yu's baby but Minazuki, Haruna and Akino play a lovestruck schoolgirl card, forcing Mai to dump Yu. The three attempts to coerce Yu into a foursome during a study session but Suzuka plays a Taboo love card, banning teachers from having sex with students. Suzuka attempts to seduce Yu by washing him with her breasts in the shower. Yu's real increased body temperature shorts out the console. Ahegao realises the console still has issues and invites them all to try it again once she has carried out repairs. Everyone leaves with vague memories, the girls of something wonderful and Yu of something terrifying.
OVA–2	"My Little Sister And I In A Virtual World, Part 2" "Kasō Sekai no Imōto to Boku Sono 2" (仮想世界の妹と僕 その2)	January 2, 2019
Ahegao brings the improved Nerd Gear to Yu's house and insists he try it out, despite his fears. This time Yu will play an action hero who must rescue his sister. The console will also scan his brain so the NPC characters will be girls from his memory. In the first scenario Yu and Suzuka are in a bathroom with Mai dead on the floor, killed for interfering with their love. To escape Yu must undress Suzuka and redress her in a new outfit without Suzuka helping at all. Yu attempts to dress Suzuka in a cat-girl bikini but cannot make himself remove Suzuka's panties and their time limit expires. In the next scenario Yu must save Suzuka from a gang led by Mai who has attached a bomb to Suzuka that can only be disarmed by Suzuka experiencing true ecstasy. After dropping Mai out a window Yu erotically massages Suzuka's naked body until she reaches ecstasy and disarms the bomb by pressing the kill button; her naked breast. Having won the game Yu is allowed to log out but finds he was actually pressing Ahegao's breast and Suzuka saw the whole thing. His explanation that he thought it was Suzuka's breast does not end well and he is thoroughly punished.

== Reception ==
The anime adaptation of My Sister, My Writer was panned for its subpar animation quality. Brian Ashcraft of Kotaku described the show as one of the most notable production disasters of 2018. According to the credits of episode 2, the most likely reason for the series' deteriorating animation quality was due to studio Buyu being in charge of key animation as opposed to the main NAZ and Magia Doraglier studios. Buyu is a production company that was only in charge of in-between animation and finish animation in episode 1, and the studio usually serves as a subcontractor for other companies. Additionally, multiple individual staffers were credited with key animation rather than individual companies.
