= Slow Damage =

2021 video game

- Slow Damage cover art, featuring the protagonist Towa
- Developer: NITRO CHiRAL
- Publishers: JP: NITRO CHiRAL; WW: JAST USA
- Producer: Digitarou
- Artist: Uiro Yamada
- Writer: Kabura Fuchii
- Platform: Microsoft Windows
- Release: JP: February 25, 2021; WW: November 14, 2022
- Genres: BL game, visual novel, eroge
- Mode: Single-player

Slow Damage (スロウ・ダメージ, Surou Damēji) is a Japanese BL visual novel developed by NITRO CHiRAL. It was originally released on February 25, 2021, for Windows PCs. The game was published in Japan by NITRO CHiRAL, and overseas by JAST USA. The story was written by Kabura Fuchii, with Uiro Yamada as the main artist. The game follows Towa, a degenerate artist who tries to paint "the deepest, darkest human desires" by finding ideal people that he refers to as his 'models'.

== Premise ==
The game is set in the year 20XX and takes place in Shinkōmi (Japanese: 新神海), a fictional region in Japan that used to be once known as Tokyo Waterfront City, now run by the yakuza, the Takasato Group (Takasato Group (鷹郷組, Takasato-gumi), as the main casino resort following a massive decline in Japan, where crime is rampant and the land is exclusively controlled by the mafia as an entirely separate city. The main character, Towa, lives a careless, unhealthy lifestyle, frequently abusing alcohol and smoking cigarettes. He lives in a studio apartment above Murase Clinic and he usually gets fussed over by his friends, Taku and Rei, for his ways of living and his reckless behaviors, who tend to look after him. His sole hobby is painting and he goes by the artist name of “euphoria”. To find new models to paint, he gets in exceedingly dangerous situations, often getting himself severely hurt during sessions and rescued by his friends. His goal is to paint the "deepest and darkest human desires" by letting the models loosen their restraints and purge their very desires on Towa himself. Towa also has the ability of seeing people’s “smokes”, which are an aura people have around them that can change color and shape based on emotions, each one having a unique color for every individual and model.

The story branches off into four different routes, each focusing on one of his potential love interests, with each route having two distinct “Euphoria” and “Madness” endings. Only two routes are available at first, being Rei’s and Taku’s, with two more routes, being Madarame and Fujieda’s, unlocked later in the game on specific conditions. The first two initial routes are both preceded by an introductory, shared chapter that later develops into either one of them based on the player’s actions. Madarame’s route is unlocked after finishing the first two and making altered decisions in the first chapter, while Fujieda’s route is available when all the three are finished.

== Characters ==
Towa (トワ)
The protagonist.
Voiced by: Yūki Ono

Takuma Murase (村瀬 巧真)
Towa’s primary physician and owner of Murase Clinic.
Voiced by: Kanehira Yamamoto

Izumi Rei (和泉 礼)
Towa’s friend and first ever model, also a bartender, body artist, and part-timer nurse at Murase Clinic.

Voiced by: Ichirou Tanaka

Madarame Kei (斑目 圭)
Towa’s old connection back when he was in the mafia.

Voiced by: Jun Kasama

Fujieda Ryou (藤枝 涼)
A cold Takasato-gumi lawyer.

Voiced by: Masaaki Mizunaka

== Development ==
Slow Damage was announced in February 2016, with Kabura Fuchii as writer and Uiro Yamada as illustrator. A teaser site to promote the game went live in 2019, with a planned release date in 2020. A prequel manga, written by Sumimoto, was released in 2020 before the launch of the game.

Slow Damage released in Japan on February 25, 2021, for Windows PCs. On November 14, 2022, JAST USA released the game outside Japan.

== Related media ==
=== Browser game ===
A free-to-play spin-off game titled Slow Damage: Clean Dishes was released on April 27, 2021, for smartphone devices on web browsers. Clean Dishes takes place in the same setting as the main game, but follows the titular "Clean Dishes," a group who cleans up rooms where people have died recently.

=== Manga ===
A short prequel manga written by Sumimoto released digitally before the game's launch. A manga based on the browser game Slow Damage: Clean Dishes titled Slow Damage: Clean Dishes -leveret-, written by Hiromasa Okujima, started serialising in Kachi Comi on April 1, 2021. On September 17, 2021, the manga was released as a standalone tankōbon.

=== Drama CD ===
A series of drama CDs titled AfterStory were released in 2022; each one focuses on one of the potential love interests and takes place after the game's story. A drama CD taking place after the events of Clean Dishes was released in 2023.

Release date	Title	Ref.
March 25, 2022	Slow Damage Drama CD Vol.1 Taku AfterStory	
June 24, 2022	Slow Damage Drama CD Vol.2 Rei AfterStory	
September 30, 2022	Slow Damage Drama CD Vol.3 Madarame AfterStory	
December 23, 2022	Slow Damage Drama CD Vol.4 Fujieda AfterStory	
June 30, 2023	Slow Damage Clean dishes DramaCD	
