= Good Night World =

Japanese manga series

- First tankōbon volume cover

グッド・ナイト・ワールド (Guddo Naito Wārudo)
- Manga
- Written by: Uru Okabe
- Published by: Shogakukan
- Imprint: Ura Sunday Comics
- Magazine: Ura Sunday; MangaOne
- Original run: December 28, 2015 – January 8, 2017
- Volumes: 5
- Manga

Good Night World End
- Written by: Uru Okabe
- Published by: Shogakukan
- Imprint: Ura Sunday Comics
- Magazine: MangaOne
- Original run: August 1, 2023 – May 21, 2024
- Volumes: 3
- Original net animation
- Directed by: Katsuya Kikuchi
- Written by: Michiko Yokote
- Music by: Takatsugu Wakabayashi
- Studio: NAZ
- Licensed by: Netflix
- Released: October 12, 2023
- Runtime: 24–30 minutes
- Episodes: 12
- icon

Good Night World (Japanese: グッド・ナイト・ワールド, Hepburn: Guddo Naito Wārudo) is a Japanese manga series written and illustrated by Uru Okabe. It was serialized in Shogakukan's Ura Sunday website and MangaOne service from December 2015 to January 2017, with its chapters collected into five tankōbon volumes.

An original net animation (ONA) series adaptation by NAZ premiered in October 2023 on Netflix.

== Synopsis ==
A dysfunctional family of four (consisting of shut-in gaming addict Taichiro Arima, his overachieving younger brother Asuma, their estranged and disregarded father Kojiro, and their disorganized and neglectful mother Miyabi) all cope with their real-world struggles by playing Planet, a virtual reality MMORPG that involves socializing with other players, forming teams, clashing with other guilds, having adventures, and fighting monsters, all under the same end goal of being the first to overpower a final boss monster called the "Black Bird of Happiness". In doing so, the Arimas unknowingly form a simulated happy family unit in a team they call "The Akabane Family" with each other, a far more stable simulated family than their real-world counterparts for as long as they follow their one "family rule": no prying information on each other's offline lives. However, the borderline between online and reality begins to merge as the game eventually becomes part of the real world, the Arimas learn about each other's true identities could make or break their family bond in both realities as well as determine the fate and survival of themselves and others.

== Characters ==
Taichirō Arima (有間 太一郎, Arima Taichirō) / Ichi (イチ)
Voiced by: Daisuke Hirose (Japanese); Nicolas Roye (English)
Asuma Arima (有間 明日真, Arima Asuma) / AAAAA (あああああ)
Voiced by: Nobunaga Shimazaki (Japanese); Kieran Regan (English)
Kojirō Arima (有間 小次郎, Arima Kojirō) / Shirō (士郎, Shirō)
Voiced by: Akio Otsuka (Japanese); Christopher Swindle (English)
Miyabi Arima (有間 雅, Arima Miyabi) / May (メイ, Mei)
Voiced by: Aya Endō (Japanese); Erin Yvette (English)
Pico (ピコ, Piko)
Voiced by: Aoi Yūki (Japanese); Jeannie Tirado (English)
Leon (レオン, Reon)
Voiced by: Ryōhei Kimura (Japanese); Todd Haberkorn (English)
Sasumata (サスマタ)
Voiced by: Hiroki Nanami (Japanese); Benjamin Diskin (English)
Shigatera (シガテラ)
Voiced by: Kenjiro Tsuda (Japanese); Ray Chase (English)
Hana Kamuro (神室 花, Kamuro Hana)
Voiced by: Rie Takahashi (Japanese); Carrie Keranen (English)
Aya Arima (有間 綾, Arima Aya)
Voiced by: Inori Minase (Japanese); Anne Yatco (English)

== Media ==
=== Manga ===
Written and illustrated by Uru Okabe, Good Night World was serialized in Shogakukan's Ura Sunday website and MangaOne service from December 28, 2015, to January 8, 2017. Five tankōbon volumes were published from April 2016 to March 2017.

A prequel series, titled Good Night World End (グッドナイト・ワールドエンド), was serialized on the MangaOne service from August 1, 2023, to May 21, 2024. The prequel's chapters have been collected into three tankōbon volumes published from October 2023 to August 2024.

==== Volumes ====
No.	Japanese release date	Japanese ISBN
1	April 12, 2016	978-4-09-127226-3
2	July 12, 2016	978-4-09-127356-7
3	October 12, 2016	978-4-09-127390-1
4	February 10, 2017	978-4-09-127529-5
5	March 17, 2017	978-4-09-127552-3

==== Good Night World End ====
No.	Japanese release date	Japanese ISBN
1	October 12, 2023	978-4-09-852873-8
2	March 19, 2024	978-4-09-853170-7
3	August 8, 2024	978-4-09-853384-8

=== Anime ===
An original net animation adaptation was announced on July 31, 2023. It is produced by NAZ and directed by Katsuya Kikuchi, with scripts written by Michiko Yokote, character designs handled by Rena Okuyama, and music composed by Takatsugu Wakabayashi. The series premiered on Netflix on October 12, 2023. The opening theme song is "Black Crack" by VTuber Kuzuha of Nijisanji, while the ending theme song is "Salvia" by Nornis, a vocal unit composed of Nijisanji members Machita Chima and Inui Toko.

==== Episodes ====
No.	Title (Note: All English titles are taken from Netflix.)	Directed by (Note: Information is taken from the ending credits of each episode.)	Storyboarded by	Original release date
1	"Log In"	Katsuya Kikuchi	Katsuya Kikuchi	October 12, 2023
2	"Error"	Nana Fujiwara	Nana Fujiwara	October 12, 2023
3	"Install"	Takayuki Kuriyama	Katsuya Kikuchi	October 12, 2023
4	"Upgrade"	Takahiro Ono	Keiji Gotoh	October 12, 2023
5	"Virus"	Yūki Nagasawa	Ryūhei Aoyagi	October 12, 2023
6	"Remove"	Katsuya Kikuchi	Katsuya Kikuchi	October 12, 2023
7	"Ban"	Masaharu Tomoda & Yūki Nagasawa	Michio Fukuda & Hiroyuki Shimazu	October 12, 2023
8	"Reload"	Nana Fujiwara	Toshinori Watanabe	October 12, 2023
9	"AR"	Takayuki Kuriyama	Hiroyuki Shimazu	October 12, 2023
10	"Registry"	Takayuki Kuriyama & Yūki Nagasawa	Katsuya Kikuchi	October 12, 2023
11	"Debug"	Nana Fujiwara	Susumu Nishizawa	October 12, 2023
12	"Hello, World"	Katsuya Kikuchi	Katsuya Kikuchi	October 12, 2023

== See also ==
- Belle, a 2021 animated science fantasy film with a similar plot written and directed by Mamoru Hosoda
- Summer Wars, a 2009 Japanese animated science fiction film with a similar plot directed by Mamoru Hosoda
- Wonder.land, a 2015 musical with a similar theme inspired by Lewis Carroll's novels Alice's Adventures in Wonderland (1865) and Through the Looking-Glass (1871)
