= King (Kanaria song) =

2020 song by Kanaria

Single by Kanaria ft. Gumi V3 English

from the album King
- Language: Japanese
- Released: 2 August 2020
- Label: Self-released
- Songwriter: Kanaria

"King" (stylized in all-caps) is a 2020 song by Japanese Vocaloid musician Kanaria. Following its release, it brought Kanaria to widespread popularity, and it received covers from dozens of VTubers and other singers.

== Overview ==
King was released on 2 August 2020. The song uses the Megpoid Vocaloid and the music video was illustrated by Nou.

King achieved one million views within two months of its release. The song caused Kanaria to rise to popularity. Subsequently, dozens of VTubers and other singers posted covers of the song, including from Kizuna Ai, Kuzuha, Nijisanji members, and Upd8 member Mei Osanai, as well as a duet by Calliope Mori and Gawr Gura; Eimika Katsuya attributed this widespread trend to the popularity of Kanaria's previous song "Hyakkisai".

Rena Murakami of the Japanese culture site Real Sound characterizes the lyrics as "reminiscent of the execution of a king". In a column for the lyrics search and music news site UtaTen, Amu Machioka characterized the song as an allegory for the house arrest, trial, and execution of Louis XVI (whom they interpreted as the titular King), told from the perspective of his executioner Charles-Henri Sanson. Eimika Katsuya said of "King": "It's a dark song with an absurd string of words, but the lyrics have a pleasant rhyme that makes it addictive." Tower Records Online said of "King": "You can't talk about internet music in 2020 without listening to this!"

It topped the Billboard Japan Top User Generated Songs for 33 weeks in 2021, as well the equivalent charts for the first half and entirety of 2021. It charted at #42 on the Billboard Japan Hot 100 and #76 at the Billboard Japan Top Download Songs chart. It ranked second place in Nana Music's 2021 Most Sung Vocaloid Songs chart.

"King" was included in Kanaria's debut album of the same name, which was released four months after the song. In 2022, it was released as part of Kanaria's greatest hits album Kanaria.code.

In 2024, McDonald's Japan collaborated with "King" to promote its fries campaign.

== Charts ==
=== Weekly charts ===
Weekly chart performance for "King" (2020)
Chart (2020)	Peak position
Japan (Japan Hot 100)	42
Billboard Japan Top Download Songs (Billboard Japan)	76
