= Gloomy the Naughty Grizzly =

Japanese anime television series

いたずらぐまのグル~ミ~ (Itazuraguma no Gloomy)
- Genre: Comedy
- Anime television series
- Directed by: Takehiro Kubota
- Written by: Mori Chack
- Studio: NAZ
- Licensed by: Crunchyroll: SA/SEA: Medialink
- Original network: Tokyo MX
- Original run: April 12, 2021 – June 28, 2021
- Episodes: 12

Gloomy the Naughty Grizzly (Japanese: いたずらぐまのグル～ミ～, Hepburn: Itazuraguma no Gloomy) is a Japanese anime television series produced by NAZ. The series aired from April to June 2021 in Japan, and was streamed worldwide via YouTube, Twitter, and Instagram.

== Synopsis ==
Gloomy was abandoned as a cub and rescued by his current owner, Pity. Pity once had a teddy bear that was thrown away by his mother, so he promised himself that he would never abandon Gloomy. Gloomy, being a wild animal, constantly attacks Pity.

== Characters ==
Gloomy (グル~ミ~, Guru ~ mi ~)
Voiced by: Kōichi Yamadera
Pity-kun (ピティーくん, Pitī-kun)
Voiced by: Natsuki Hanae

== Production and release ==
Gloomy the Naughty Grizzly was announced on December 28, 2020. Produced by NAZ, the series was directed by Takehiro Kubota and written by Mori Chack, the latter being the original creator of the Gloomy Bear character. The series aired from April 12 to June 28, 2021, on Tokyo MX. Crunchyroll licensed the series outside of Asia. Medialink also licensed the series across Asia-Pacific. It also streamed worldwide on their YouTube channel, Twitter and Instagram accounts.

== Episodes ==
No.	Title	Directed by	Written by	Storyboarded by	Original release date
1	"The Behavior of Bears"; Transliteration: "Kuma no Shūsei" (Japanese: くまのしゅうせい)	Takehiro Kubota	Megu Yagi	Takehiro Kubota	April 12, 2021
2	"The Tricks of Bears"; Transliteration: "Kuma no Tokugi" (Japanese: くまのとくぎ)	Takehiro Kubota	Megu Yagi	Takehiro Kubota	April 19, 2021
3	"Snacks"; Transliteration: "Oyatsu" (Japanese: おやつ)	Takehiro Kubota	Megu Yagi	Takehiro Kubota	April 26, 2021
4	"The Bear Teaser"; Transliteration: "Kuma Jarashi" (Japanese: くまじゃらし)	Takehiro Kubota	Megu Yagi	Takehiro Kubota	May 3, 2021
5	"The Day You Came"; Transliteration: "Hajimemashite no Hi" (Japanese: はじめましてのひ)	Takehiro Kubota	Megu Yagi	Takehiro Kubota	May 10, 2021
6	"Perfect Timing"; Transliteration: "Zetsumyō Taimingu" (Japanese: ぜつみょうたいみんぐ)	Takehiro Kubota	Megu Yagi	Takehiro Kubota	May 17, 2021
7	"The Behavior of Bears 2"; Transliteration: "Kuma no Shūsei Ni" (Japanese: くまのしゅうせい2)	Takehiro Kubota	Megu Yagi	Takehiro Kubota	May 24, 2021
8	"Self-Control"; Transliteration: "Gaman" (Japanese: がまん)	Takehiro Kubota	Megu Yagi	Takehiro Kubota	May 31, 2021
9	"Reports"; Transliteration: "Hōkoku" (Japanese: ほうこく)	Takehiro Kubota	Aimi Morodome	Takehiro Kubota	June 7, 2021
10	"The Tricks of Bears 2"; Transliteration: "Kuma no Tokugi Ni" (Japanese: くまのとくぎ2)	Takehiro Kubota	Aimi Morodome	Takehiro Kubota	June 14, 2021
11	"Tardiness"; Transliteration: "Chikoku" (Japanese: ちこく)	Takehiro Kubota	Aimi Morodome	Takehiro Kubota	June 21, 2021
12	"Reading with a Bear"; Transliteration: "Kuma to Dokusho" (Japanese: くまとどくしょ)	Takehiro Kubota	Aimi Morodome	Takehiro Kubota	June 28, 2021
