= Sweet Pool =

- Sweet Pool Remaster cover art, featuring the protagonist Youji
- Developer: NITRO CHiRAL
- Publishers: JP: NITRO CHiRAL; WW: JAST USA
- Writer: Kabura Fuchii
- Platforms: Microsoft Windows, PlayStation Vita
- Release: Microsoft Windows: JP: December 19, 2008; WW: Dec 19, 2018; PlayStation Vita: JP: May 31, 2018
- Genres: BL game, visual novel, horror
- Mode: Single-player

Sweet Pool is a Japanese BL horror visual novel developed by Nitro+CHiRAL. It originally released on December 19, 2008 and was released outside Japan on December 19, 2018.

== Synopsis ==
The plot follows Youji Sakiyama, a student who returns to high school after a year's absence due to illness. He starts developing weird symptoms, like meat chunks coming out his body and hallucinations of blood and flesh. Around the same time, his mysterious classmate Tetsuo and the infamous student Zenya take an interest in him.

== Characters ==
Sakiyama Youji (崎山 蓉司)
Voiced by: Wataru Hatano

Shironuma Tetsuo (城沼 哲雄)
Voiced by: Yoshihiki Kawahara

Okinaga Zenya (翁長 善弥)
Voiced by: Hikaru Midorikawa

Mita Makoto (三田 睦)
Voiced by: Daisuke Kishio

Kamiya Takehiko (上屋 武彦)
Voiced by: Kōji Yusa

Kitani Kouhei (姫谷 浩平)
Voiced by: Hideyuki Umezu

Okinaga Kunihito (翁長 邦仁)
Voiced by: Yōsuke Akimoto

Serizawa Erika (芹沢 枝里香)
Voiced by: Mami Ozaki

== Gameplay ==
Sweet Pool is a homoerotic horror visual novel with a branching storyline. Most of the game is spend reading dialogue and monologue, accompanied with character sprites and background visuals. Unlike most visual novels, Sweet Pool doesn't make use of dialogue options, instead players are forced to choose between “instinct” or “reason” at certain moments of the game. Depending on what the player chooses, the game will develop in one of six possible endings.

== Release ==
Sweet Pool released in Japan on December 19, 2008 for Microsoft Windows. A remastered version released on May 25, 2018 in a package edition and on July 27, 2018 as a download edition. A PlayStation Vita port of the game to celebrate its tenth anniversary was published by Dramatic Create, a brand of HuneX, on May 31, 2018.

On Anime Expo 2018, JAST USA announced they would be bringing BL titles to the west under their JAST Blue brand, with their first game being Sweet Pool. Before the launch of the full game, JAST USA released a demo on Steam. The English-language release came out on December 19, 2018 on JAST USA's store and as a censored version on Steam. A paid DLC patch for the Steam version, to readd the 18+ content of the game, released separately on JAST USA's store.

== Related media ==
=== Manga ===
A manga adaptation illustrated by Mayu Kurumazaki started serializing in Be x Boy GOLD on August 28, 2009. Viz Media released the manga in English digitally under their BL-imprint SuBLime in 2012.

==== Volumes ====
| No. | Original release date | Original ISBN | English release date | English ISBN |
|---|---|---|---|---|
| 1 | October 11, 2010 | 9784862638694 | July 24, 2012 | 9781421548968 |
| 2 | February 10, 2012 | 9784799710852 | November 27, 2012 | 9781421548975 |

=== Novel ===
A novelization written by Shinobu Kuriki released on October 19, 2011. The story is told from the perspective of Tetsuo.

=== Stage ===
A theatrical adaptation written by Hiroki Uchida and directed by Norihito Nakayashiki was performed at The Galaxy Theatre from March 12, 2022 until March 21, 2022.
