= Dandelion (manga) =

2002 Japanese one-shot manga by Hideaki Sorachi

- Key visual of the anime adaptation

だんでらいおん (Danderaion)
- Genre: Comedy; Supernatural
- Manga
- Written by: Hideaki Sorachi
- Published by: Shueisha
- Magazine: Weekly Shōnen Jump
- Published: September 14, 2002
- Original net animation
- Directed by: Daisuke Mataga
- Written by: Yosuke Suzuki
- Music by: Yuki Hayashi
- Studio: NAZ
- Licensed by: Netflix
- Released: April 16, 2026
- Runtime: 23–38 minutes
- Episodes: 7
- icon

Dandelion (Japanese: だんでらいおん, Hepburn: Danderaion) is a Japanese one-shot manga written and illustrated by Hideaki Sorachi. It was published by Shueisha in Weekly Shōnen Jump magazine in September 2002. An original net animation (ONA) series adaptation produced by NAZ was released on Netflix in April 2026.

== Plot ==
Tetsuo Tanba and Misaki Kurogane are two operatives working for the Japan Angel Federation, an organization tasked with helping souls pass on to the afterlife. One day, the two encounter an old man's spirit, and the two have to use their skills to help him pass on. This task, however, proves difficult due to their conflicting personalities.

== Characters ==
Tetsuo Tanba (丹波 鉄男, Tanba Tetsuo)
Voiced by: Chikahiro Kobayashi (Japanese); Kaiji Tang (English)
An operative for the Japan Angel Foundation, who has a foul-mouthed and lazy personality.
Misaki Kurogane (黒鉄 美咲, Kurogane Misaki)
Voiced by: Megumi Han (Japanese); Risa Mei (English)
The team leader of Team 21, also known as the Dandelion Group, and Tanba's boss.
Seiki Kyōkawa
Voiced by: Mamoru Miyano (Japanese); Colby Rummell (English)
Daigorō Kyōkawa
Voiced by: Kazuhiko Inoue (Japanese); Jason Marnocha (English)
Yūichi Kyōkawa
Voiced by: Kensho Ono (Japanese); John Choi (English)
Shinji Kyōkawa
Voiced by: Yūki Ono (Japanese); Ryan Colt Levy (English)
Kikugumi squad leader (masked man)
Voiced by: Tomokazu Sugita (Japanese); Bill Rogers (English)
Free Isobe
Voiced by: Shin-ichiro Miki (Japanese); Joe Hernandez (English)
Streaked Pork Man
Voiced by: Fumihiko Tachiki
Tamesuke Naitō
Voiced by: Susumu Chiba (Japanese); Keith Silverstein (English)
Inuyama
Voiced by: Satoshi Hino (Japanese); Bill Rogers (English)
Asako Kurogane
Voiced by: Rie Kugimiya (Japanese); Amber Lee Connors (English)
Raymond Honda (professor)
Voiced by: Daisuke Sakaguchi (Japanese); Frank Todaro (English)
Seiki's mother
Voiced by: Kikuko Inoue
Inomata
Voiced by: Kujira (Japanese); Laila Berzins (English)

== Media ==
=== Manga ===
The original Dandelion one-shot is the debut work of Hideaki Sorachi. It received an honorable mention at the 71st Tenkaichi Manga Awards—a monthly newcomer contest run by Shueisha's Weekly Shōnen Jump magazine—in June 2002. It was later published in the magazine on September 14 of that same year, and was later included in the first tankōbon volume of Gintama, Sorachi's first serialized work.

=== Anime ===
An original net animation (ONA) series adaptation produced by NAZ was announced on February 27, 2026. The series is directed by Daisuke Mataga, written by Yosuke Suzuki, and features character designs by Asari Ayui and music by Yuki Hayashi. While based on the original one-shot, it includes a new story expanding on the original chapter, including elaborating on the main characters' backgrounds. It was released on Netflix on April 16, 2026; the series ran for seven episodes. The theme song is "Goron to Doron" (ゴロンとドロン; lit. 'Roll and Vanish'), performed by Kocchi no Kento.

==== Episodes ====
No.	Title	Directed by	Written by	Original release date
1	"Those Who Laugh At Pudding Will Cry Over Pudding"; Transliteration: "Purin o warau mono wa, purin ni naku." (Japanese: プリンを笑う者は、プリンに泣く。)	Kathy Pilon	Gavin Harrison	April 16, 2026
2	"To Know Him is to Punch Him"; Transliteration: "Kare o shiru koto wa, kare o naguru kotoda." (Japanese: 彼を知ることは、彼を殴ることだ。)	Kathy Pilon	Garrett Hanson	April 16, 2026
3	"You Only Live Once - So Die Laughing!"; Transliteration: "Jinsei wa ichido kiri ――dakara, warainagara shinou!" (Japanese: 人生は一度きり――だから、笑いながら死のう！)	Kathy Pilon	Gavin Harrison	April 16, 2026
4	"The Dirtier the Mire, the Prettier the Lotus"; Transliteration: "Doronuma ga kitanakereba kitanai hodo, hachisunohana wa utsukushiku saku." (Japanese: 泥沼が汚ければ汚いほど、蓮の花は美しく咲く。)	Kathy Pilon	Garrett Hanson	April 16, 2026
5	"We Were All Geniuses"; Transliteration: "Watashitachi wa mina, tensaidatta" (Japanese: 私たちは皆、天才だった)	Kathy Pilon	Gavin Harrison	April 16, 2026
6	"Why Do the Worst People Never Stop Smiling?"; Transliteration: "Naze, tobikiri tachinowarui renchū wa kesshite egao o tayasanai no ka?" (Japanese: なぜ、とびきり質の悪い連中は決して笑顔を絶やさないのか？)	Kathy Pilon	Garrett Hanson	April 16, 2026
7	"Seize the Moment! Do it Now!"; Transliteration: "Ima kono shunkan o tsukame! Ima sugu kōdō shiyou!" (Japanese: 今この瞬間を掴め！今すぐ行動しよう！)	Kathy Pilon	Garrett Hanson	April 16, 2026
