= Kuzuha =

Nijisanji Japanese VTuber

- 葛葉
- Born: November 10
- Occupation: Virtual YouTuber

YouTube information
- Channel: Kuzuha Channel
- Years active: 2018–present
- Genres: Livestreaming; Singing; Gaming
- Subscribers: 2.12 million
- Views: 1.5 billion
- Last updated: 24 January 2026
- Website: www.nijisanji.jp/talents/l/kuzuha

Kuzuha (Japanese: 葛葉) is a Japanese virtual YouTuber (VTuber) affiliated with Nijisanji. He started as an independent creator in 2018 before being scouted into Nijisanji, as part of now-dissolved branch "Nijisanji Gamers". He is mainly active as a game streamer and as well utaite. He also performs as a singer signed under UMJ's Virgin Music.

In June 2025, his YouTube channel surpassed 2 million subscribers, being the first in Nijisanji as well the first male VTuber in Japan to achieve this milestone.

== Career ==
Kuzuha debuted as an independent VTuber on 8 March 2018, before being scouted by Anycolor (then-Ichikara) and officially become part of Nijisanji's gamer branch "Nijisanji Gamers" from July 30. He was the first VTuber to be scouted by the company. The branch was later dissolved in December 2018 and the members now referred to as "EX-Gamers".

He was featured along with fellow VTuber Shibuya Hal in the special edition of Anan's 2318th issue (released in October 2022). This marks the first time for VTuber to be featured as cover of the magazine.

In September 2026, is it announced that Kuzuha will be voicing Marvin in the Japanese dub version of movie Street Fighter. This marks Kuzuha's debut as voice actor.

=== Character setting ===
Kuzuha's character is a 100+ years old vampire who does not drink blood; his real name is "Alexander Lagusa" (アレクサンドル・ラグーザ). He is a NEET gamer who started streaming to make easy money. Kuzuha is capable of transforming himself into a girl called "Sanya" (サーニャ), but admitted that it "takes a lot of his magic power" so she does not appear much.

=== Streaming style ===
Kuzuha is known for streaming his gameplay for long periods. He would start streaming between 9 and 11pm (JST) for about 6 to 10 hours for almost every day. He is also noted for his proficiency in gaming skills and his intriguing word of choice during live commentary and conversation. Despite this, many people who have directly involved with him reveal that Kuzuha is very shy towards new people and does not talk as much as he does in streams.

=== Activities as singer ===
Kuzuha released his first original song on September 28, 2021, a digital single "Contrail" (コントレイル), in which he was involved with the lyrics. It topped the Billboard Japan in downloaded song category. He held his first solo live event on November 10 (his birthday) where he announced his major debut under Virgin Music as well the release of an album, Sweet Bite. In 2023, he released a single, "Black Crack". The lead song was used as the opening song for anime Good Night World.

As utaite, his most popular cover is "King", a song by Kanaria. The cover has exceeded 53 million views as of June 2025.

On June 11, 2025, he held his first solo live stream concert to commemorate the 2 million subscribers milestone which he achieved in June 3. He was the first Japanese male VTuber and the first in Nijisanji to achieve this milestone. The concert, lasted for about an hour, included celebration messages from famous streamers he has been involved with, including Ryosuke Yamada. He also announced the release of his second digital single "Gimmie More" (ギミモ), which was written and composed by Nqrse.

=== Chronoir ===
Along with Kanae, another VTuber from Nijisanji, Kuzuha and Kanae has been known as Chronoir (Note: Stylized as "ChroNoiR";referred to in Japanese as Kuronowa (くろのわ)) even before the former officially joined Nijisanji. (Note: The two officially become "Chronoir" in July 17; Kuzuha officially joined Nijisanji in July 30.) The duo streamed let's play content together, and also appeared in events as singers. Kanae personally reached out to Kuzuha, who has played a lot with him, because there were not many male VTuber units during that time. The unit name was chosen among viewer's submission, which contains the Japanese and French for the word "black", both Kuzuha and Kanae's favorite color. Chronoir also perform as a duo signed under Nijisanji Records until 2024, where they moved to AccelNotes afterwards. The unit opened their official YouTube channel on December 31, 2019. A weekly program called "Chronoir Does Something" (くろのわーるがなんかやる, Kuronowaru ga Nanka Yaru) started in 2022.

== Discography ==
=== Mini albums ===
Released	Title
March 9, 2022	Sweet Bite
July 29, 2026	Adamantite

=== Singles ===
Released	Title
November 28, 2023	"Black Crack"

=== Digital singles ===
Released	Title
September 8, 2021	"Contrail" (コントレイル)
June 11, 2025	"Gimmie More" (ギミモ)

==== Collaboration ====
Year	Released	Title	Participated
2019	November 4	"Fam Fam Time!"	DoKuzuHonSha (Note: Dora, Honma Himawari, Yashiro Kizuku)
2019	November 27	"I'm Gonna Be Ok"	TogaNoir (Note: Kenmochi Toya, Fushimi Gaku, Kanae)
2020	March 18	"Not For You"	Kanae Kuzuha
2021	January 5	"Ultimate Happy Carnival"	DoKuzuHonSha
2021	February 25	"Nijiiro no Puddle" (虹色のPuddle)	(Note: Kagami Hayato, Kenmochi Toya, Saegusa Akina, Sasaki Saku, Shellin Burgandy, Higuchi Kaede, Furen E Lustario, Hoshikawa Sara, Yorumi Rena, Ryushen)
2021	February 28	"Yotsuba Forever" (ヨツバフォエバ)	DoKuzuHonSha
2022	March 28	"Crow" (クロウ)	Kagami Hayato
2022	August 7	"Hurrah"	(Note: Tsukino Mito. Sasaki Saku, Lize Helestia, Hoshikawa Sara, Fuwa Minato, Axia Krone)
2023	May 24	"Buddy and Wilderness"	(Note: Kanae, Sasaki Saku, Hoshikawa Sara, Hyakumantenbara Salome)
2024	April 29	"Picaresque Romancer" (ピカレスクロマンサー)	Mey-chan
2024	June 2	"Mement" (メメント)	VACHSS (Note: Kanae, Kagami Hayato, Fuwa Minato, Kenmochi Toya, Yumeoi Kakeru)
2024	August 5	"One Shot"	Mey-chan
2025	February 22	"Lazy x Crazy"	EX-Gamers (Note: Kanae, Akabane You, Sasaki Saku, Honma Himawari, Makaino Ririmu, Shiina Yuika)
