= Class 2-B Hero Destroyerz =

Japanese manga series

- First tankōbon volume cover, featuring Valaris III (left) and Akira Kumon (right)

2年B組 勇者デストロイヤーず (Ni-nen Bī-gumi Yūsha Desutoroiyāzu)
- Genre: Comedy
- Manga
- Written by: Hideaki Sorachi
- Published by: Shueisha
- English publisher: NA: Viz Media
- Imprint: Jump Comics
- Magazine: Weekly Shōnen Jump
- Original run: April 20, 2026 – present
- Volumes: 1
- icon

Class 2-B Hero Destroyerz (Japanese: 2年B組 勇者デストロイヤーず, Hepburn: Ni-nen Bī-gumi Yūsha Desutoroiyāzu) is a Japanese manga series written and illustrated by Hideaki Sorachi. It has been serialized in Shueisha's shōnen manga magazine Weekly Shōnen Jump since April 2026. As of September 2026, a single volume has been released.

== Plot ==
The Demon King, Valaris, brought an age of darkness upon the world. However, a hero defeated him, and light returned. Before his fall, Valaris created a female clone named Valaris III, into whom he transferred his power. Driven by the desire to resurrect the dark forces, Valaris III enrolls at Shinkai Academy, an ordinary, modern high school. Hiding her identity, she aims to build a new army of demons and takes notice of a mysterious transfer student named Akira Kumon—a seemingly average student who, in reality, is the toughest fighter in the entire school.

== Publication ==
Written and illustrated by Hideaki Sorachi, Class 2-B Hero Destroyerz started in Shueisha's shōnen manga magazine Weekly Shōnen Jump on April 20, 2026. A single tankōbon volume has been released as of September 4, 2026.

The series's chapters are simultaneously published in English on Viz Media's Shonen Jump and Shueisha's Manga Plus digital platforms.

=== Volumes ===
No.	Japanese release date	Japanese ISBN
1	September 4, 2026	978-4-08-885228-7
2	December 4, 2026	978-4-08-885272-0

== Reception ==
The first volume debuted 15th at Oricon's weekly manga ranking, with 12,548 copies sold. The series was nominated for the 2026 Next Manga Award and placed 16th.
