= Togainu no Chi =

Japanese BL visual novel and its adaptations

- Original PC game cover

咎狗の血
- Genre: Action; Boy's love; Post-apocalyptic
- Video game
- Developer: Nitro+chiral (PC); HuneX (PS2, PSP)
- Publisher: Nitro+chiral (PC); Kadokawa Shoten (PS2, PSP)
- Genre: BL game, visual novel
- Platform: Windows; PlayStation 2 PlayStation Portable
- Released: Windows: JP: February 25, 2005; NA: February 25, 2020; PlayStation 2: JP: May 29, 2008; PlayStation Portable: JP: December 23, 2010
- Manga
- Written by: Kana Yamamoto
- Published by: ASCII Media Works (2008); Biblos (2005)
- Magazine: Magazine ZERO
- Original run: 2005 – 2008
- Volumes: 1
- Novel
- Written by: Kabura Fuchii
- Illustrated by: Kana Tatana
- Published: February 7, 2006
- Manga
- Written by: Suguro Chayamachi
- Published by: Enterbrain
- English publisher: NA: Tokyopop
- Magazine: comic B's-LOG
- Original run: November 1, 2006 – present
- Volumes: 10
- Anime television series

togainu no chi -Bloody Curs-
- Directed by: Naoyuki Konno
- Produced by: Atsuhiro Iwakami
- Written by: Natsuko Takahashi
- Music by: Tomohisa Ishikawa; Masaaki Iizuka
- Studio: A-1 Pictures
- Licensed by: NA: Aniplex of America
- Original network: TBS, MBS
- Original run: October 7, 2010 – December 23, 2010
- Episodes: 12
- icon

Togainu no Chi (Japanese: 咎狗の血; lit. 'Blood of the Reprimanded Dog') is a Japanese BL visual novel created by Nitro+CHiRAL and illustrated by Kana Tatana. The plot centers on Akira, a young man who is made to participate in a deadly game called "Igura" (from "игра"/ "igra", Russian and Bulgarian for "game") in post-apocalyptic Japan in exchange for being freed from prison. His goal is to beat "Il Re" (Italian for "The King"), the strongest person in Igura. The game was originally released on PC as Togainu no Chi in 2005, with a PlayStation 2 version titled Togainu no Chi TRUE BLOOD being released on May 29, 2008. A PlayStation Portable version was released on December 23, 2010, under the name of Togainu no Chi True Blood Portable. On 23 July 2025 the TRUE BLOOD version of the game was released for Windows PCs.

The game has been adapted into two manga series, a novel, and a twelve-episode anime series. In March 2010 as part of the Nitro+CHiRAL 5th anniversary an anime adaptation was announced for Togainu no Chi with production by Aniplex. The anime began airing on MBS and TBS on October 7, 2010. Aniplex of America streamed and simulcast the series in North America on Anime News Network.

== Plot ==
After being devastated in the Third World War (known as The Third Division), Japan was divided in two: the CFC, which controls the eastern half of Japan, and Nikkouren, which controls the west. Several years after the end of the war, a crime organization called Vischio has taken control of the destroyed city of Toshima (formerly Tokyo, Japan's capital city), where they are holding a battle game known as Igura.

Igura is a vicious battle game that may result in the death or murder of participants. To participate, one must go to Toshima's palace, meet with a man named Arbitro, and tell him the reason for their decision to enter into Igura. Upon meeting with Arbitro, participants are given five dog tags, each engraved like a card in a standard deck of playing cards. One tag must hang from the participant's neck as proof of participation. Participants must then put their lives on the line to collect others' tags, with the goal being to collect a Straight or a Full House using cards 10 through Ace. (The game incorrectly refers to such a Straight as a Royal Flush, which is a poker hand that requires that all cards be of the same suit.) Tags representing cards less than 10 are referred to as "pig tags" and can be used in dedicated neutral zones to purchase sustenance, first aid supplies, and other essentials. If a participant collects a Straight or Full House consisting of the tags representing the cards 10 through Ace, they earn the right to challenge Il Re in battle.

The rules for combat dictate that battles must be between two participants with at least one non-participating witness present, and end when one combatant either dies or allows their back to touch the ground. The winner takes the loser's tags and is free to do as they please to the loser after that, often consisting of rape and resulting in the loser's death; however, many of the participants wantonly break the rules of the game. Two executioners, Gunji and Kiriwar, work for Arbitro, patrolling Toshima to kill rule breakers and to clean up the corpses of the fallen; however, they view themselves above the rules and often kill participants at their whims without consequences.

Many participants use a drug called "Rein," which temporarily boosts their strength significantly and gives them an advantage in battle; however, Rein has many side effects, is extremely addictive, and the withdrawal is unbearably unpleasant and can even be fatal. Il Re is involved in the distribution of Rein, which leads to him having a high level of wealth. If they defeat Il Re, they assume his position in distributing Rein and become incredibly wealthy, which is the primary motivation for many of the fighters who join Igura.

The game begins with the protagonist, a young man named Akira living in the CFC district of Japan and a champion in Bl@ster - a fighting game with much stricter rules and moderation than Igura - being falsely accused of murder and arrested. After some time in prison, a mysterious woman and man involved in the government visit him, offering him freedom from his sentence if he agrees to participate in Igura and defeat Il Re.

The story follows Akira's life in the harsh, lawless Toshima as he fights both to survive and to unravel the mysteries developing around him. The game has multiple endings, and binary decision points during the story determine which ending the player will achieve. Many of them are brutal, and the game contains themes around rape, BDSM, mutilation, and murder.

== Characters ==
Akira (アキラ)
Voiced by: Kosuke Toriumi (PS2, Anime, Drama CD)
The game's protagonist. Akira is the cool and silent type. He has grayish hair, blue eyes, and stands at 172cm tall. He likes omelet rice-flavored Solids. He grew up as an orphan along with Keisuke. Akira was an undefeated champion of the street fighting game "Bl@ster", where he participated in the RAY district under the name LOST. He was accused of murder and sentenced to life imprisonment, but Emma and Gwen had him removed from prison so he could participate in Igura, which he does with slight reluctance. He usually acts cold and uncaring with an indifference to life and death, but has a very naive side to him. His weapon is a knife.
Keisuke (ケイスケ)
Voiced by: Tomokazu Sugita, credited as "Nanimusha" for the PC and drama CD
Akira's childhood friend and hard-working factory employee. He has brown hair and eyes and is 178cm tall, and he likes green curry-flavored Solids. He and Akira grew up together in the same orphanage. Because he is a bit weak, he has always admired Akira's strength and suffers from low self-esteem and self-deprecation. Though he is a bit quiet and shy, if Akira is involved, he suddenly becomes bold. Upon hearing Akira's situation, Keisuke covertly chases after Akira and also joins Igura, despite his weakness and lack of fighting experience.
Rin (リン)
Voiced by: Jun Fukuyama, credited as "Hayato Kiryuin" for the PC and drama CD
A young blond, blue-eyed boy participating in Igura. 154cm tall. Though he is sometimes mistaken for a girl because of his small body, he is quite strong and able to get by in Igura. He helps Akira around the town, and his optimism serves as a foil to Akira's nihilism and inspires Akira to continue to pursue his goals. In the anime, it is mentioned that Rin and Shiki are half brothers, having the same father but different mothers. He is a former Bl@ster participant (from the GHOST area) who fights with two small daggers and also enjoys taking pictures. He likes the yakiniku flavored Solids. He's also good at parkour, as he jumps from roofs and walls in the manga and anime.
Shiki (シキ)
Voiced by: Hikaru Midorikawa
A black-haired, red-eyed man standing at 188cm and covered in black clothing, who arms himself with a katana. He is the strongest man in Igura. Because he often appears in front of Igura participants and slays them immediately and with no warning, he is extremely feared. Though he kills Igura participants frequently, he neither carries nor collects tags and thus does not appear to be an Igura participant. He is a violent man shrouded in mystery. The first Il Re who has never been defeated. Shiki formed the Igura to battle against Line-compatibles, so he could kill Nano and quell his memories of the first time they met.
Motomi (源泉)
Voiced by: Kazuya Ichijō
An unshaven, middle-aged information collector who knows a lot about the tournament. Has brown hair and eyes and stands at 183cm tall. He has a friendly, carefree personality and is a heavy smoker. He does not participate in the game but is in Toshima to observe it. He carries a gun for protection.
Arbitro (アルビトロ, Arubitoro)
Voiced by: Masaru Hishi (PC, Drama CD), Kōsuke Okano (PS2, Anime)
Manager of the narcotics organization Vischio. A gaudy blond man who always wears a mask over his face. 181cm tall. Has a strange hobby involving modifying the bodies of attractive young men in gruesome ways, which he views as a form of artistic expression. Due to this "hobby", his mansion is full of statues of nude boys and he keeps Kau, a heavily mutilated boy, as his pet 'dog'. He also maintains a collection of disfigured slaves, which he uses to reward people.
Kau (狗)
Arbitro's beloved 'pet', who is a young boy. He has white hair, is covered in black leather and a blindfold, has a large scar and piercings on his stomach (due to Arbitro's personal preferences), and walks on all fours. Because Arbitro destroyed his eyes and vocal cords, he cannot see or speak. He does, however, have a keen sense of smell and has been trained to pick up the scent of dog tags to help find rule-breakers within Igura. His name's kanji means "dog" in Japanese. He shows signs of severe Stockholm syndrome.
Kiriwar (キリヲ, Kiriwo)
Voiced by: Fuji Bakuhatsu (PC, Drama CD), Katsuyuki Konishi (PS2, Anime)
Executes the rule violators of the tournament. Though he works for Arbitro, his ties to him are loose, and he often likes to get him mad. At 200cm, he is a tall, strong man who carries a metal pipe (which he has lovingly named "Mitsuko") as a weapon. He has short, black hair and a scar across his forehead. He is usually seen with Gunji, whom he calls "hiyo" or "hiyoko" (which means "baby chick"). Kiriwar likes to mess with Arbitro and seems not to care much about his job. His name is pronounced "Kiriwo" but is officially written as "Kiriwar".
Gunji (グンジ)
Voiced by: Kazuya Sugisaki (PC, Drama CD), Kishō Taniyama (PS2, Anime)
Executes the rule violators of the tournament. He is a 195cm tall blond man who fights with metal knuckle claws. He wears a bright red hooded jacket that is open at the front, exposing most of his tattoo-covered torso. Gunji is not very smart, acts spontaneously and violently, and is extremely sadistic in his killings, but still has a fun-loving, childish innocence. Gunji has an affinity with name-calling. He is usually seen with Kiriwar, whom he calls "jiijii" ("old man"), Arbitro "papa", and Shiki "Shikitty". Gunji seems to confuse cats with dogs, since although Kau is supposed to be a pet "dog", Gunji refers to him as 'Tama', which is a common pet name for a cat. In the manga, he also names a cat that he finds 'Pochi', the common pet name for a dog. Also, though many English-speaking fans spell and pronounce his name as "Gunzi", the name "Gunji" is considered the 'official' name as it is used most often and also used on official merchandise.
Emma (エマ, Ema)
Voiced by: Kaori Okuda (PC), Asako Dodo (PS2)
A beautiful one-armed woman. 167cm tall. She is the one who suggests participating in Igura to Akira as a way to free him of his false charge. She is often seen with Gwen. Very little is known about her, but before the war, she worked as a scientist. In the manga by Chayamachi, she is seen taking care of Nano.
Gwen (グエン, Guen)
Voiced by: Kikutarō Namerikawa (PC), Takuo Kawamura (PS2)
A serious man in a suit and hat appears with Emma to convince Akira to participate in Igura. An honest man with a normally harsh expression. 178cm tall.
Takeru (猛)
Voiced by: Takezō Koike (PC), Hideki Ogihara (PS2)
A one-eyed youth participating in Igura with an extreme passion to win, no matter what it takes.
Nano (ナノ, Nano)
Voiced by: Prof. Shiryuu (PC), Takumi Yamazaki (PS2)
Known as N, Nano or Nicole Premier. He is an enigmatic figure throughout the game. He is not an Igura participant and carries neither tags nor a weapon, despite the dangers in Toshima. He dresses very conservatively, which adds to his unsettling behavior. 182cm tall. Though he often appears in front of Akira, it is a mystery as to whether he is a friend or foe. Nano's blood is the source of Line.
Tomoyuki (トモユキ)
Voiced by: Yuichi Nakamura
A long-haired man participating in Igura. Though he seems to know Rin, they are not on very good terms with each other.
Kazui (カズイ)
Voiced by: Daisuke Hirakawa
A black-haired man, somehow connected to Rin and Tomoyuki, who seems to resemble someone else Rin knows.
Tōya (トウヤ, Tōya)
Voiced by: Kentarou Itō
A young blond man participating in Igura with a team. He is his team's leader. Yukihito is one of his team members.
Yukihito (ユキヒト)
Voiced by: Hiroshi Kamiya
A red-haired man in his 20s and a new character added to "Togainu no Chi: True Blood", the PlayStation 2 version of the game. He is a former Bl@ster participant (from AREA: RUDE) who is currently participating in Igura as a member of Touya's team.

== Release ==
Togainu no Chi was originally released as an adult game on February 25, 2005, for Microsoft Windows on CD-ROM. The game was later released on PlayStation 2 with its adult content removed as Togainu no Chi TRUE BLOOD on May 29, 2008. TRUE BLOOD includes a new romanceable character named Yukihito. This version of the game was released on PlayStation Portable on December 23, 2010, as Togainu no Chi True Blood Portable. On September 21, 2015, the TRUE BLOOD version was ported to iOS under the name Togainu no Chi TBA. The Android version was released on December 11, 2015. On July 23, 2025 Togainu no Chi True Blood NITRO ARCHIVE was released for Windows PCs.

=== English localization ===
During Anime Expo 2018, JAST USA announced they would release Nitro+CHiRAL titles outside of Japan under their BL label JAST BLUE, Including Togainu no chi. The English localisation released on February 21, 2020, under the name Togainu no Chi ~Lost Blood~. On December 19, 2025, the steam version of Togainu no Chi True Blood NITRO ARCHIVE was updated to add English and Simplified Chinese support to the game.

== Media ==
=== Drama CDs ===
Three drama CDs were released after the game's release on PC in 2005. Togainu no Chi Image drama CD vol 1 was released on July 29, 2005. This drama CD centers around Akira and Shiki's relationship. Togainu no Chi Image drama CD vol 2 was released August 26, 2005. This drama CD centers around Akira and Keisuke's relationship. Togainu no Chi ANOTHER STORY ~ RIN was released December 29, 2005. This drama CD centers around Rin.

=== Manga ===
A manga adaptation of Togainu no Chi, illustrated by Suguro Chayamachi, began serialization serialized in Comic B's LOG in January 2006, and is published by Enterbrain. The manga was licensed for an English-language release in North America by Tokyopop in 2008. Another adaptation was illustrated by Yamamoto Kana and published by ASCII Media Works. This version focuses on Keisuke's storyline. The complete volume was released on July 22, 2008.

=== Books ===
A light novel Togainu no Chi written by Ikumi Kazuha (伊久美和葉) and Nitro+CHiRAL, illustrated by Tatana Kana (たたなかな) and Kazuki Tomomaya (かずきともまや), published by Biblos (ビブロス) was released February 3, 2006. It contained sets of short stories dealing with the characters after the events in the game. An art book titled Togainu no Chi True Blood Official Fan Book containing game information, character profiles, artwork, and voice actors' interviews was released on July 3, 2008.

=== Anime ===
In March 2010 as part of the Nitro+CHiRAL 5th anniversary an anime adaptation was announced for Togainu no Chi with production by Aniplex. The anime began airing on MBS and TBS on October 7, 2010. Aniplex of America will stream and simulcast the series in North America on Anime News Network. The first DVD was released on December 22, 2010.

==== Episode list ====
No.	Title	Original release date
1	"LOST" "Uro Yume" (虚夢)	October 7, 2010
Akira, the series protagonist, is a participant in a fighting tournament called "Bl@ster," after a successful battle, he retires to his quarters. He's awakened from sleep when a group of police break into his room and pin the blame for a recent murder on him, a crime which carries a sentence of life imprisonment. With no way to defend himself against the charges, Akira waits in fear for his life. He's visited in jail by a woman named Emma who offers him the only alternative to a life spent in captivity - join a higher-stakes fighting competition, and defeat the man at the top. Faced with no other option, Akira gathers his things and leaves for the city of Toshima, where the Igura competition is held. He has nothing more than the clothes on his back and the dog tags that peg him as a participant, so when some thugs show up to harass him and take a hit of a drug giving them superpowers, he has little recourse. He's only saved by a man dressed in black, who brutally murders his attackers with his sword. The man threatens Akira as well, only letting him leave with his life when Akira shows too much pride to beg for his life.
2	"Toshima" "Shi-gai" (死街)	October 14, 2010
Akira wakes up and finds Keisuke entering the room where he is staying. After finding out that Keisuke followed him to Toshima and refused to leave, he gives Keisuke his knife. They go for a walk where they find Rin fighting a man. They leave but are soon caught up by Rin, who claims that they need to pay to enter his area; however, he would let them off this once because they are new. Akira asks where he can get a weapon, and Rin gives him his. Rin brings them to one of the neutral zones where they meet Motomi and get to know the drug, Line - on the way they meet the Executioners and Kau. Rin then brings them to Arbitro's Mansion so Keisuke can sign up. The mansion is filled with "pretty boys" statues. Keisuke leaves the mansion without joining the game.
3	"Igura" "Kyōzen" (狂争)	October 21, 2010
Keisuke finally gets his tags, and while exiting the mansion, is attacked by Takeru. Akira defends them, and Takeru runs off. Akira picks up a cross. Akira is dragged off by Takeru. Takeru is revealed to be an ex-Bl@ster and is playing the Igura because he wants to win and be rich. Takeru takes back his cross, which is a memento from his dead sister. Takeru calls Akira Lost because after winning Bl@ster, he always seems to be without emotions.
4	"Ease" "Kyū-kei" (休刑)	October 28, 2010
Rin finds Akira after he is dragged off by Takeru. Soon, they encounter Tomoyuki, who is someone from Rin's past. But he just ignores him and tells him to shut up. Akira and Rin have a short conversation as they get back to the hotel and meet up with Motomi. There, Keisuke sees Akira and is happy and okay. Rin comes with a bag full of solids and water and asks them if they want to do something fun. They all eat and chat on the roof of a building. At nighttime, Shiki appears and slays a group Line addicts. One person yells that he has appeared, and Rin jumps at hearing his name. Akira runs after Rin but instead encounters Shiki in a nearby alley. They have a short fight, in which Akira ends up on the ground. Shiki picks him up and pins him against the wall, asking if he wants to die. He then starts choking him, but Akira fights back by folding up and kicking him away. Shiki is amused by this and tells him he'll play with him again soon. As he walks off, Akira is oddly energized by this and states, "So that's... Shiki."
5	"Crack" (決蔑)	November 4, 2010
A mysterious man offers Takeru the drug Line, which he takes. After waking and finding neither Rin nor Akira with him, Keisuke runs off to look for them while Akira is attacked and injured by a Line-influenced group, only escaping (with a tag) when the leader of the group goes insane and collapses when he licks Akira's blood. Shiki meets with Arbitro, and the former gives the latter a black case full of what appears to be enhanced Line. After Motomi saves Akira (who was wondering if he did that to the leader of the group) from an encounter with the Executioners, the two decide to go to the hotel, where they meet up with Rin and Keisuke. Akira, irritated by the way Keisuke always makes light of the situation and puts himself down, yells at Keisuke, who, feeling useless, runs away.
6	"Desire" "Innen" (因念)	November 11, 2010
A man (in the shadows) murders everyone in a club, meanwhile Takeru drinks Line. Akira goes around the city searching for Keisuke, Rin is back at the hotel and overhears a conversation between Line users. Akira continues to search and discovers the bodies of the men in the club, to which he is sickened. While walking into an alleyway, he is attacked and beaten by Takeru; Takeru licks Akira's blood and begins to choke then slowly retreats. Rin and Motomi have a conversation about drugs/city/life. Takeru thinks about his sister and regrets leaving her, but dreams of winning Igura for his family. He is then discovered by Keisuke, who superpowered on Line, crushes Takeru's skull. Keisuke then goes to meet Akira; whom he knocks out and then carries off.
7	"Severed" "Iga Kusari" (怒鎖)	November 18, 2010
It is revealed how Keisuke has changed, and why he took the drug line. After the flashback, Akira wakes up in the middle of an unknown house with his crazed best friend. After a long talk, Akira is knocked unconscious.
8	"Rain" "Ame" (雨)	November 24, 2010
Shiki is revealed to be Rin's half-brother and betrays Rin by killing all of his friends. After Rin falls off the bridge, he sees a set of tags that is almost a royal flush (only the jack is missing).
9	"Bond" "Kizuna" (絆)	December 2, 2010
Keisuke shows Akira all the tags that he's gotten, stating his desire to see more emotions, particularly the "troubled, agonized, dying" face. They begin to fight, during the battle, Akira tells Keisuke how he felt all this time, which angers Keisuke even more. Akira gets his weapon knocked out of his hands, causing him to get cut and bleed. Some blood gets onto Keisuke's face and mouth, which causes him to suffocate. Akira sees backflashes of his past and snaps back into reality. He finds out that Keisuke is still alive and brings him to bed. Akira watches over Keisuke until sunrise, when Rin finds them and takes off with their tags to fight Il re. Arbitro recognizes the jack but still allows Rin to fight.
10	"Il Re" "Il Re"	December 9, 2010
Rin prepares to fight Il re which turns out to be Shiki, but gets defeated quickly. Akira comes to the rescue as the military begins to bomb the place. Shiki saves Arbitro and questions him about Akira. Rin and Akira take shelter in an abandoned warehouse where they agree to meet Motomi at the church. At first, Rin refuses to go and questions why Akira would help him after he had betrayed him previously. Rin admits that he would have killed Keisuke to get the tags before. Akira points out that Rin refuses to believe in anyone anymore after Shiki betrays him (which Rin denies). Akira promises not to betray Rin and asks for his trust. Rin demands that he prove himself, which Akira counters by saying that Rin needs to trust him so he can prove himself. Rin threatens to kill Akira if he is betrayed. - Gunji and Kiriwar shows up. To escape, the two of them split up. Gunji goes after Akira while Kiriwar goes after Rin. Akira gets beaten up badly, and before he is killed, N comes to the rescue and carries him off to where Keisuke is. *Flashback* Akira meets Nano as a younger boy, in exchange for a promise to meet again, N gives him a knife *Return to present* Akira wakes up and finds Keisuke unconscious. Emma and Gwen show up as they are on a mission to bring Premier (Nano) back with them. Emma admits to framing Akira for the murder and got him stuck in Toshima. She shoots Gwen for getting in her way, then before she shoots Nano, he uses his arm to pierce through her body. Shiki shows up while Akira gets Keisuke and prepares to escape.
11	"Convict" "Shujin" (囚人)	December 16, 2010
Shiki fights Nicole Premier, and ends up drinking Nicole's blood, from which Line is made, which would normally drive people crazy or kill them. Shiki survives and goes looking for Akira. All the while, Arbitro, Kau, Kiriwar, and Gunji watch from the roof of a nearby building. Shiki finds Akira and Keisuke as they are fleeing to safety. When Shiki tries to force Akira to come with him, Keisuke tries to protect Akira, but is killed by Shiki.
12	"Beginning" "Kaishi" (開始)	December 23, 2010
After Keisuke's death, Akira moves in to attack Shiki. They exchange blows before Rin arrives and tries to help, but gets stabbed in the leg. Rin tells Akira to leave, but Akira says he won't leave Rin behind because that would betray Rin's trust in him. Nicole Premier suddenly reappears, saving Akira and Rin and helping them escape. Time Skip: Akira now has a "normal" job. Rin is in a hospital, healing, when Akira visits him and threatens to kill him if he breaks his promise of coming to visit him the next day. Outside the hospital, Akira meets Motomi, who invites him to go and eat with him. He tells Akira that there is a new Line and that their city may soon be overtaken by it. The episode ends with Akira going to fight Shiki (who is on a mountain surrounded by an open box of Line). Akira empathizes with the rest of society's wish to live. He recognizes the value of life only due to Keisuke's death. Akira says that: "This is not another person I am fighting. This is me".

==== Soundtrack ====
Opening Theme:

- "Rose-Hip Bullet" by GRANRODEO

Ending Theme:

1. "No moral" by Kanako Itou (ep 1)
2. "Bright Lights" by Seiji Kimura (ep 2)
3. "Don't Stare Me" by VERTUEUX (ep 3)
4. "Toge" by SADIE (ep 4)
5. "Once More Again" by Aki Misato (ep 5)
6. "Requiem Blue" by CurriculuMachine feat. W.K. (ep 6)
7. "Crossing Fate" by OLDCODEX (ep 7)
8. "Yasashisa ni Mamorarete" by Kita Shuuhei (ep 8)
9. "Honed Moon - Togareta Tsuki" by Kanako Itou (ep 9)
10. "Don't look away" by CurriculuMachine (ep 10)
11. "STILL anime Ver." by Kanako Itou (ep 11)
12. "GRIND style GR" by GRANRODEO (ep 12)

=== Video games ===
CHiRALmori was released January 25, 2008, and is also known as the Nitro+CHiRAL amusement disk. This PC game includes a Togainu no Chi minigame featuring chibi versions of the characters playing poker with their dog tags as well as two other minigames featuring characters from Lamento -Beyond the Void-.

Togainu no Chi Desktop Accessory is a program produced by Nitro+chiral that includes wallpapers, a screensaver, a silent version of the opening video, a clock that can be switched to show images of most of the characters, a calendar, and a set of window straps.

=== Stage ===
In February 2025, a theatrical adaptation of Togainu no Chi was announced. The play was performed from 10 to 24 August 2025 at Shinjuku Face, and livestreamed via DMM TV. All five story routes from the original game were adapted. The script was written by Hiroki Uchida and Norihito Nakayashiki was in charge of directing. Yuuri Takahashi was cast as Akira, Asahi Tanaka as Keisuke, Ryuujirou Izaki as Rin, Kouhei Hayashida as Motomi, Taiga Nakamoto as Shiki, Rio Harada as Emma, Koudai Takikawa as Kiriwar, Hiromu Sakata as Gwen, Yuuki Fujiwara as Arbitro, and Naoki Takeshi as Nano.
