= NITRO CHiRAL =

Japanese video game developer

Nitro Chiral
- Industry: Computer games
- Genre: BL, Eroge & Visual novels
- Headquarters: Japan
- Area served: Japan
- Products: Togainu no Chi; Dramatical Murder; Sweet Pool; Lamento: beyond the void; Slow Damage
- Website: www.nitrochiral.com

Nitro Chiral, currently stylized as NITRO CHiRAL, formerly stylized as Nitro+CHiRAL, is a BL game brand owned by Japanese visual novel company Nitroplus, created in 2004.

== History ==
The company was formed in 2004 and released their first work, Togainu no Chi, in 2005. Their second game, Lamento: ~BEYOND THE VOID~ was released in 2006. A fan disc named Chiral Mori was released in 2008. It is an amusement disc that includes three minigames and features the characters of their first two games. While Togainu no Chi and Lamento were adult games, Chiral Mori was given an approval for all ages. Their third game, Sweet Pool was also released in 2008 for adults only. During the same year, Togainu no Chi was re-released on PlayStation 2 for ages 15+ and called Togainu no Chi True Blood.

A monthly subscription based app for mobile phones called CHiRAL MOBiLE launched in 2010. The app included extra's such as original artwork and phone wallpapers. Two titles where released and accessible within the app. The first of which, Itsuwari no Alkanet (Note: Japanese: 偽りのアルカネット, Hepburn: Itsuwari No arukanetto), released in four separate parts. On June 7, 2010, the common route released, on July 5 Yūto's route released and on August 2 Sakai's and Kazuki's route released. A drama CD taking place after the events of the game released on November 17, 2010. On December 16, 2010, their second mobile title, World's end Nightmare, released on the app. The game released in 30 chapters, with a new chapter releasing twice a week, on Tuesday and Thursday. In October 2012, CHiRAL MOBiLE was discontinued.

In 2010, Togainu no Chi was ported to the PSP handheld consoles as Togainu no Chi True Blood Portable. Nitro+chiral released their fourth game, Dramatical Murder, in 2012. A fan disc of Dramatical Murder called Dramatical Murder re:connect and featuring additional scenes and songs was released in 2013. A 15+ PlayStation Vita port of the game called Dramatical Murder re:code was released in 2014. In 2015, Togainu no Chi was ported to iPhone and Android devices; both versions are based on the PlayStation 2 port for ages 15+. In 2016, Nitro+chiral re-released Togainu no Chi, Lamento: Beyond the Void and Sweet Pool for the Windows 10 operating system.

THE CHiRAL NIGHT rhythm carnival, a rhythm game featuring characters and music from previous released Nitro+chiral games, released in 2017.

In 2021, Nitro+chiral released their fifth game, Slow Damage. Within the same year, a browser based mobile side story called Slow Damage: Clean Dishes was released, featuring all new characters within the same setting as its original game.

On January 4, 2023, the brand name was changed from Nitro+CHiRAL to NITRO CHiRAL, along with a new logo.

In 2025, Nitro Chiral launched a marking campaign to celebrate its 20th anniversary called NITRO CHiRAL Memories. This included a range of merchandise and an exhibition from may 30 to October 27 in Tokyo, Osaka, and Kyoto.

On July 23, 2025, Togainu no Chi True Blood was released for Windows PCs. Dramatical Murder re:code released on Nintendo Switch on December 25, 2025.

=== English localisation ===
On July 4, 2018, it was announced at the Anime Expo that JAST USA's new JAST Blue branch, which focuses on boys' love games, will release Nitro+CHiRAL's visual novel titles in English.

On June 14, 2021, JAST Blue announced that they will be postponing their localization of Lamento -Beyond the Void- indefinitely.

On December 19, 2025, English and Simplified Chinese support for the Steam version of Togainu no Chi True Blood was released.

== Video games ==
Game	Details
Togainu no Chi Original release date(s): JP: 25 February, 2005; NA: 25 February, 2020	Release years by system: 2005 - Microsoft Windows; 2008 - PlayStation 2; 2010 - PlayStation Portable; 2015 - iOS; 2015 - Android; 2016 - Windows 10
Togainu no Chi Original release date(s): JP: 25 February, 2005; NA: 25 February, 2020	Notes: The PlayStation 2 port of the game, called Togainu no Chi True Blood, was rated CERO C (15+); the sex scenes and nudity were removed while the violence was toned down. Added a new route for a completely original character exclusive to this port.; The PlayStation Portable, iOS and Android versions are all based on the PlayStation 2 port.; The Windows 10 port doesn't feature any alterations from the original release.
Lamento: ~Beyond the Void~ Original release date(s): JP: 27 October, 2006	Release years by system: 2006 - Microsoft Windows; 2016 - Windows 10
Lamento: ~Beyond the Void~ Original release date(s): JP: 27 October, 2006	Notes: The Windows 10 port does not feature any alterations from the original release.
Chiral Mori Original release date(s): JP: 25 January, 2008	Release years by system: 2008 - Windows 7
Chiral Mori Original release date(s): JP: 25 January, 2008	Notes: Chiral Mori was released for all ages.; It consists of three minigames featuring characters from Togainu no Chi and Lamento.
Sweet Pool Original release date(s): JP: 19 December, 2008; NA: 19 December, 2018	Release years by system: 2008 - Microsoft Windows; 2016 - Windows 10; 2018 - PlayStation Vita
Sweet Pool Original release date(s): JP: 19 December, 2008; NA: 19 December, 2018	Notes: The Windows 10 port does not feature any alterations from the original release.
Dramatical Murder Original release date(s): JP: 23 March, 2012; NA: 6 April, 2021	Release years by system: 2012 - Microsoft Windows; 2014 - PlayStation Vita; 2025 - Nintendo Switch
Dramatical Murder Original release date(s): JP: 23 March, 2012; NA: 6 April, 2021	Notes: A fan disc called Dramatical Murder re:connect was released for Windows in 2013 and features new scenes, songs and extended endings as well as a minigame.; The PlayStation Vita port, called Dramatical Murder re:code, was rated CERO C (15+); the sex scenes and nudity were removed while the violence was toned down. Added a new route for one of the side characters.
THE CHiRAL NIGHT rhythm carnival Original release date(s): JP: 11 August, 2017	Release years by system: 2017- Microsoft Windows
THE CHiRAL NIGHT rhythm carnival Original release date(s): JP: 11 August, 2017	Notes: THE CHiRAL NIGHT rhythm carnival was released for all ages.; A rhythm game featuring characters and music from previous Nitro+chiral games.
Slow Damage Original release date(s): JP: 25 February, 2021; NA: 14 November, 2022	Release years by system: 2021 - Microsoft Windows
Slow Damage Original release date(s): JP: 25 February, 2021; NA: 14 November, 2022	Notes: A side story titled "Slow Damage: Clean Dishes" was released on April 27, 2021 revolving around two characters created especially for this new game.

== Staff ==
Each game has its own list of staff and other collaborators. Listed here is the core staff from Slow Damage.

- Producer: Dijitarou
- Scenario Writer: Kabura Fuchii
- Lead Programmer: Kukuruna
- Character/CG Illustrator: Yamada Uiro
- SD Character Illustrator: Yuupon
- Public Relations: Chiral-kun
- Sales: Kurosawa Hideki
- Sound design: Breavehearts Co., Ltd.

== Former Staff ==
- Illustrator of Togainu no Chi and Lamento ~BEYOND THE VOID~: Kana Tatana (たたな かな) who now uses the name Chinatsu Kurahana after her departure from Nitro+Chiral in 2006.
- Illustrator of sweet pool: Onitsuka Seiji.
- Illustrator of DRAMAtical Murder: Honyalala.

== Music Performance ==
- Kanako Itou
- ZIZZ STUDIO
- GEORIDE
- Kazuhiro Watanabe
- Pale Green (Seiji Kimura)
- GOATBED
- VERTUEUX
- ARKTA
- Anna Evans Golden Folks
- THE ANDS
- KiRi
