= Mori Chack =

Japanese graphic designer (born 1973)

- Born: March 23, 1973 (age 53); Sakai, Osaka, Japan
- Occupation: Graphic designer
- Known for: Chax product line

Mori Chack (森チャック Mori Chakku, born on March 23, 1973 in Sakai, Osaka, Japan) is the artist name of a Japanese graphic designer.

== Career ==
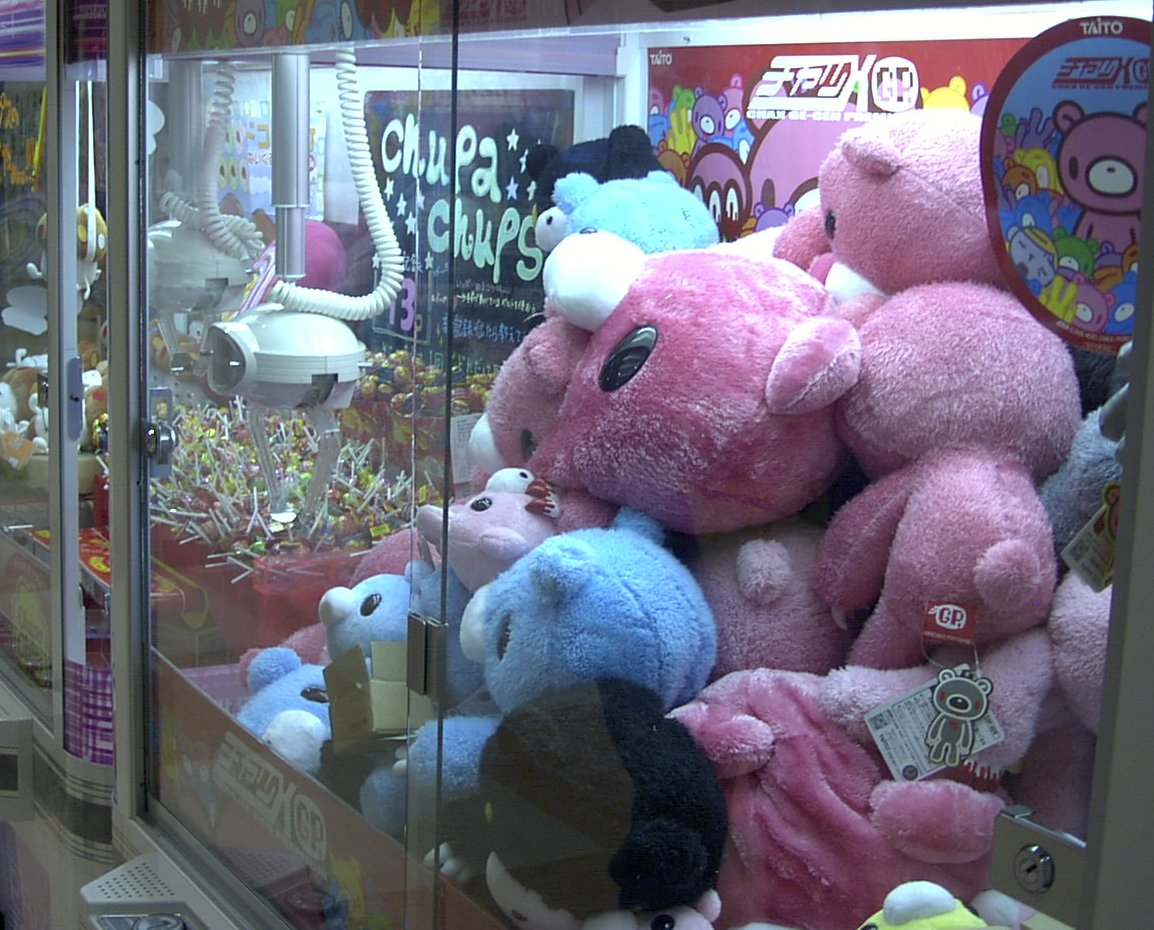
Stuffed Gloomy Bear toys in a Niigata arcade UFO catcher.

Chack is famous for his Chax product line, and especially the character Gloomy Bear, a 2 m tall, violent, and bloodthirsty pink bear that eats humans. Chack created the character in 2000. The design was created as an antithesis to the excessively cute products produced by companies such as Disney and Sanrio. The Gloomy Bear is an allegory for Chack's belief that humans and animals are incompatible. Chack also created the characters Podolly (a sheep in a wolf's clothing), and Kumakikai (a silver robot made from a recycled teddy bear).

The origin story of Gloomy Bear is that he was abandoned as a little bear and adopted by Pity (a little boy). The cute bear eventually grew up into an angry adult bear and attacked Pity, explaining its blood stains. However, Pity knew Gloomy was innocent in his violence, and always ended up hugging the bear back despite the savage beating.

A segment on Gloomy Bear and a short interview with Mori Chack are featured in Episode 6 of Series 2 of the BBC Three series Japanorama. The character Gloomy Bear received a TV anime titled Gloomy the Naughty Grizzly in April 2021. A one-shot manga titled Gloomy Bear: Apocalyptic Love was released on April 4, 2023.
