= Nitroplus Blasterz: Heroines Infinite Duel =

2015 video game

- Developer: Team Arcana (Examu)
- Publishers: JP: Nitroplus, Marvelous Inc. (Console); NA: Marvelous USA
- Platforms: Arcade, PlayStation 3, PlayStation 4, Microsoft Windows
- Release: Arcade: JP: April 30, 2015; PS3, PS4: JP: December 10, 2015; NA: February 2, 2016; PAL: April 7, 2016; Windows; December 8, 2016
- Genre: Fighting game
- Mode: Multiplayer; single-player
- Arcade system: Taito Type X2 (NESiCAxLive)

Nitroplus Blasterz: Heroines Infinite Duel (ニトロプラス ブラスターズ -ヒロインズ インフィニット デュエル-, Nitoropurasu Burasutāzu: Heroinzu Infinitto Dueru) is a fighting game developed by Examu's Team Arcana and published by Nitroplus. The game crosses over heroines from various visual novels and games released by Nitroplus, as well as those from manga and anime series that Nitroplus writers have been involved with. The game was released in arcades on April 30, 2015 and was released on PlayStation 3 and PlayStation 4 in collaboration with Marvelous Entertainment's Marvelous Inc. on December 10, 2015. Marvelous USA published the game in North America on February 2, 2016. It was later released on Windows on December 8, 2016. The game originates from the doujin game Nitro+ Royale: Heroines Duel, which is stated as its predecessor.

== Gameplay ==
The game uses five buttons; light attack, medium attack, heavy attack, escape action, and heavy action. The escape action button can be used to perform evasive maneuvers and guards while heavy actions can be used to push an opponent back. Players can perform Infinite Blasts, which can interrupt an opponent's attack, Variable Rushes, which allows for surprise combos, and Lethal Blazes, which serve as the game's super combo attacks. Players can also choose two support characters which they can summon to assist them.

== Characters ==
There are 32 characters which are split up into playable characters and support characters. Super Sonico was initially a support character, but was later also made playable, as of console release. An original character, who is a dark palette swap and final boss version of Al Azif, Al Azif Ex Mortis is the non-playable final boss of the game, created by Mugen Yoguruma, act as a copy of the Necronomicon, crafted from the fragments of the Al Azifs from the infinite universes in which Demonbane failed. At the end of the story mode, Ex Mortis is defeated and absorbed by Al Azif, who gains all of Ex Mortis' memories, as well as the completion of her soul.

=== Playable characters ===
- Heart Aino (Arcana Heart) ^{a}^{b}
- Al Azif (Demonbane series)
- Anna (Gekkō no Carnevale)
- Ethica (Tokyo Necro)
- Ein (Phantom of Inferno)
- Homura (Senran Kagura) ^{a}^{b}
- Ignis (Jingai Makyō)
- Mora (Vampirdzhija Vjedogonia)
- Satsurikuin Ouka (OKStyle mascot)
- Ruili (Kikokugai: The Cyber Slayer)
- Saber (Fate) (Fate/Zero incarnation) ^{a}
- Muramasa Sansei (Full Metal Daemon: Muramasa)
- Saya (Saya no Uta)
- Super Sonico ^{b}

=== Support characters ===
- Akane Tsunemori (Psycho-Pass) ^{a}
- Alushia (Hakubō no Dendōshi)
- Amy (Gargantia on the Verdurous Planet) ^{a}
- Angela Balzac (Expelled from Paradise) ^{a}
- Another Blood (Kishin Hishō Demonbane)
- Anri (Tenshi no Nichō Kenjū -Angelos Armas-)
- Aoi Mukō (Kimi to Kanojo to Kanojo no Koi)
- Carol (Guilty Crown: Lost Christmas) ^{a}
- Dragon (Dra†KoI)
- Ishima Kaigen (Hanachirasu)
- Kuro no Franco/Franco il Nero (Zoku Satsuriku no Jango -Jikogu no Shōkin Kubi-)
- Miyuki Sone (Kimi to Kanojo to Kanojo no Koi)
- Mugen Yoguruma (D.Y.N. Freaks)
- Natsumi Aibara (Hello, world.)
- Sakura (Axanael)
- Spica (Sumaga)
- Super Sonico
- Yoishi Mitsurugi (Phenomeno)
- Yuki Takeya (School-Live!) ^{a}

=== Other characters ===
- Saki Tsuzura (Arcana Heart) ^{a}^{b}
- Mirai (Senran Kagura) ^{a}^{b}

^a Guest character.
^b DLC character in PlayStation version. Available in PC version by default.

== Reception ==
Reception

Aggregate score
Aggregator	Score
Metacritic	(PS4) 70/100 (PC) 63/100

Review scores
Publication	Score
4Players	(PS4) 65%
Destructoid	(PS4) 8/10
Famitsu	28/40
GameRevolution	(PS4) 6/10
Hardcore Gamer	(PS4) 4/5
MeriStation	(PS4) 7.5/10
PlayStation Official Magazine – UK	(PS4) 7/10
Push Square	(PS4) 4/10
USgamer	(PS4) 3/5

The PlayStation 4 and PC versions received "mixed or average reviews" according to the review aggregation website Metacritic. In Japan, Famitsu gave the PlayStation 3 and PlayStation 4 versions a score of all four sevens for a total of 28 out of 40.

Kyle LeClair of Hardcore Gamer said of the PS4 version, "In the end, those who are more familiar with works of Nitroplus will get the most out of Nitroplus Blasterz (shockingly enough), but even those with no prior knowledge of the included franchises should easily be able to enjoy it." Kyle MacGregor Burleson of Destructoid called it "a fast, smooth, strategic, and generally entertaining fighting game that has found a happy medium between accessibility and depth."
