= Kanako Itō =

Japanese singer (born 1973)

Kanako Itō いとう かなこ
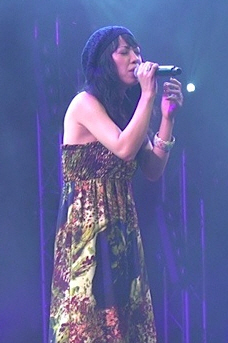
- Kanako Itō performing at Anime Festival Asia Singapore in 2011

Background information
- Born: March 28, 1973 (age 53)
- Origin: Utsunomiya, Tochigi, Japan
- Genre: J-pop
- Occupation: Singer
- Years active: 2001–present
- Labels: Indies Maker; Mages
- Website: kanataro.amebaownd.com

Kanako Itō (いとう かなこ, Itō Kanako; born March 28, 1973) is a female Japanese singer from Utsunomiya, Tochigi, Japan. She has sung a large number of songs that have been used in a variety of video games, visual novels, and anime.

Itō has sung songs for many visual novels, one song in particular being "Kanashimi no Mukō e" (悲しみの向こうへ), the "bad end" ending theme to the visual novel School Days. Itō has also sung songs for a drama CD and anime adaptations of School Days. She has sung songs for the games Kikokugai: The Cyber Slayer, Saya no Uta, Demonbane, Higurashi no Naku Koro ni Matsuri, Chaos;Head, Chaos;Child, Steins;Gate, and Robotics;Notes, along with the anime series Please Twins!, Myself; Yourself, Hatenkō Yūgi and Occultic;Nine. Her song "DD" on her single "A Wish for the Stars" has her singing in French. In April 2012, she made her American performance debut at Anime Boston. She returned to the United States for an appearance at Sakura-Con in 2015.

== Discography ==
=== Singles ===
- "Ethereal Echo", released April 28, 2006 (featuring Kishin Hishō Demonbane themes)
- "Escape", released February 22, 2007 (featuring Higurashi no Naku Koro ni Matsuri themes)
- "Kimi to Yozora to Sakamichi to" (キミと夜空と坂道と), released October 24, 2007 (featuring Myself; Yourself themes)
- "Heartbreaking Romance", released February 20, 2008 (featuring Hatenkō Yūgi themes)
- "Find the blue", released May 7, 2008 (featuring Chaos;Head themes)
- "Tsuisou no Despair" (追想のディスペア), released June 26, 2008 (featuring Higurashi no Naku Koro ni Kizuna: Tatari themes)
- "Tsuioku no Kaze" (追憶の風), released July 16, 2008 (featuring Togainu no Chi True Blood themes)
- "A Wish for the Stars", released August 6, 2008 (featuring Blassreiter themes)
- "F.D.D.", released October 29, 2008 (featuring the Chaos;Head anime opening theme)
- "fake me", released February 25, 2009 (featuring Chaos;Head Noah Xbox 360 themes)
- "Skyclad no Kansokusha" (スカイクラッドの観測者, Skyclad Observer), released October 28, 2009 (featuring Steins;Gate Xbox 360 themes)
- "Fetishism Ark", released June 30, 2010 (featuring Chaos;Head Noah PSP and Chaos;Head Love Chu Chu! themes)
- "A.R. / Star-Crossed", released July 28, 2010 (featuring Steins;Gate PC and Starry Sky: in Spring PSP themes)
- "Hacking to The Gate", released April 27, 2011 (featuring the Steins;Gate anime opening theme)
- "Uchuu Engineer" (宇宙エンジニア), released June 22, 2011 (featuring Steins;Gate PSP and Steins;Gate: My Darling's Embrace Xbox 360 themes)
- "Hisenkei Geniac" (非線形ジェニアック), released May 23, 2012 (featuring Steins;Gate themes)
- "Sora no Shita no Soukanzu" (空の下の相関図, Correlation Diagram Under the Sky), released July 25, 2012 (featuring the Robotics;Notes theme)
- "Chaos Logic" (カオスロジック), released November 28, 2012 (featuring Chaos;Head themes)
- "Topology" (トポロジー), released March 6, 2013 (featuring the Robotics;Notes anime theme)
- "Anata no Eranda Kono Toki wo" (あなたの選んだこの時を, The Moment You Had Chosen), released April 24, 2013 (featuring the Steins;Gate: The Movie − Load Region of Déjà Vu theme)
- "Rakuen no Hologram" (楽園のホログラム), released May 29, 2013 (featuring the Steins;Gate: Linear Bounded Phenogram theme)
- "Hijitsuzai Seishounen" (非実在青少年, Nonexistent Youth), released November 26, 2014 (featuring Chaos;Child Xbox One themes)
- "Singularity" (シンギュラリティ), released July 22, 2015 (featuring Chaos;Child themes)
- "Amadeus" (アマデウス), released November 25, 2015 (featuring the Steins;Gate 0 theme)
- "Seisuu 3 no Nijou" (聖数3の二乗), released October 26, 2016 (featuring the Occultic;Nine theme)
- "Uncontrollable", released January 25, 2017 (featuring the Chaos;Child theme)
- "Fátima" (ファティマ), released April 25, 2018 (featuring the Steins;Gate 0 theme)
- "COSMIC LOOPER", released September 29, 2018 (featuring Steins;Gate Elite theme)

=== Albums ===
- Puzzle (パズル, Pazuru), released February 27, 2004 (featuring the Saya no Uta theme)
- Sign (サイン, Sain), released May 27, 2005 (featuring Jingai Makyō themes and the Togainu no Chi theme)
- Largo, released October 4, 2006 (featuring the Lamento: Beyond the Void, Kishin Hishō Demonbane, Gekkō no Carnevale, and Night Wizard! themes)
- Another Best, released December 10, 2008 (featuring Kishin Hishō Demonbane, Chaosic Rune, School Days, Shamana Shamana: Tsuki to Kokoro to Taiyō no Mahō, and Please Twins! song)
- <<<Stargate>>>, released August 26, 2009 (featuring a Steins;Gate theme)
- ChaosAttractor, released January 27, 2010 (featuring Chaos;Head Noah and Steins;Gate themes)
- Spark, released March 28, 2012
- Reactor, released May 27, 2015 (featuring the Chaos;Child Xbox One theme)

=== Single songs in compilations ===
- "Reichin Rin'inshan" (涙尽鈴音響), ending theme to Kikokugai: The Cyber Slayer (2002)
- "Aoi Kioku" (青い記憶), "Kiraboshi" (煌星), "There's The Earth Link Somewhere", opening, ending, and insert songs to "Hello, world." (2002)
- "Ten'i Yūkyū" (天意悠久), ending theme to Zanma Taisei Demonbane (2003)
- "Saya no Uta" (沙耶の唄) ending theme to Saya no Uta (2003)
- "Koi ni Oitsukenai" (恋に追いつけない), from Please Twins! Image Vocal Album: Esquisse (2003)
- "I Myself Am Hell", ending theme to Phantom: The Animation OVA (2004)
- "Shadow in the dark", theme song to Kishin Hōkō Demonbane PS2 game (2004)
- "Ohisama ni Yakusoku" (おひさまに約束), "Mirai Kitto Zutto!" (未来・きっと・ずっと!), and Te o Hanasanai de (手を離さないで), opening and ending themes to Chibi Mama (2004)
- "Kokō no Tama" (孤高之魂魄), opening theme to Jingai Makyō (2005)
- "Hotarubi" (蛍火), ending theme to Hanachirasu (2005)
- "Toaru Ryū no Koi no Uta" (とある竜の恋の歌), ending theme to Dra+KoI (2006)
- "Mayoi no Mori" (迷いの森), "Tataeshi Tatakai no Uta" (賛えし闘いの詩), "When The End", "Denshō no Uta: Verum" (伝承の詩 -Verum-), insert songs to Lamento: Beyond the Void (2006)
- "Happy blue sky trip", ending theme to the PC game Sumaga (2008)
- "Miracles May", ending theme to sweet pool (2008)
- "Kohaku no Inori" (琥珀の祈り), an insert song to the PC game Amber Quartz (2009)
- "Skyclad no Kansokusha" (スカイクラッドの観測者, Skyclad Observer), opening theme to Steins;Gate visual novel (2009)
- "Hateshinai Sora e" (果てしない蒼空へ), ending theme of PSP version of the Chaos;Head Love Chu Chu! visual novel (2011)
- "Hacking to the Gate", opening theme to the Steins;Gate anime (2011)
- "Maris Stella", ending themes to the Are You Alice? PSP game (2011)
- "Call of the Dungeon", opening theme to Cladun x2, the sequel to the Cladun: This is an RPG PSP game (2011)
- "Nageki no Ancient Machine" (嘆きのAncient Machine), opening theme to the Labyrinth Tower: Legasista PlayStation 3 game (2012)
- "Immer Sie" and "Tears", ending themes to the PC game Dramatical Murder (2012)
- "Dramatique", a song featured in promotional videos for the PC game Dramatical Murder (2012)
- "Chaos Logic" (カオスロジック), opening theme of PS3 version of Chaos;Head Noah (2012)
- "Crystalline" and "At Last", ending themes to the PC game Dramatical Murder re:connect (2013)
- "Anata no Eranda Kono Toki wo" (あなたの選んだこの時を, The Moment You Had Chosen), opening theme to Steins;Gate: The Movie − Load Region of Déjà Vu (2013)
- "Eien no Owari ni", insert song in Kimi to Kanojo to Kanojo no Koi. (2013)
- "By My Side" and "Lullaby Blue", special ending themes to the Dramatical Murder anime series (2014)
- "Scarlet" and "Voyage Lucid", ending themes to the Dramatical Murder drama CDs, volumes 1 and 2 (2014)
- "Reaching out for our future", opening theme to Etrian Odyssey Untold 2: The Fafnir Knight, a video game in the Etrian Odyssey series (2014)
- "Amadeus" (アマデウス), opening theme to Steins;Gate 0, visual novel (2015)
- "Fates Fall -Kibou no Kage-" (Fates Fall -希望の陰-, Fates Fall -Winds of Hope-), song for Star Guardian event in the game League of Legends (2017)
- "Fátima" (ファティマ), opening theme to Steins;Gate 0, anime adaptation (2018)
- "Konna Boku Demo" (こんな僕でも, Even a person like me), grand ending theme to the Robotics;Notes DaSH visual novel (2019)
- "Lost Word Chronicle" (ロストワードクロニクル), theme song for the game Touhou LostWord (2020)
- "Boundary of Time" (刻の境界), song for the game Touhou LostWord (2022)
- "Game Over", opening theme to Anonymous;Code, visual novel (2022)
