= Gen Urobuchi =

Japanese writer (born 1972)

- Born: Wada (first name unknown); December 20, 1972 (age 53); Tokyo, Japan
- Education: Wakō University
- Occupations: Writer, scriptwriter
- Relatives: Tsunashirō Wada (Great-grandfather); Sunao Ōtsubo (Grandfather); Shū Wada (Father); Natsuko Sebata (Mother)
- Writing career
- Genres: Dark Fantasy, horror, thriller, sci-fi, tragedy
- Notable works: Puella Magi Madoka Magica; Fate/Zero; Psycho-Pass; Saya no Uta; Kamen Rider Gaim
- Notable awards: 1st Newtype Anime Awards - Screenwriter Prize; 11th Tokyo Anime Award for Best Screenplay

Gen Urobuchi (Japanese: 虚淵 玄, Hepburn: Urobuchi Gen; born December 20, 1972) is a Japanese novelist, visual novel writer and anime screenwriter. He is known for being the co-creator of the highly acclaimed and commercially successful anime series Puella Magi Madoka Magica, which earned him the Tokyo Anime Award for Best Scriptwriter, as well as the writer of the 2003 visual novel Saya no Uta, the 2012 anime Psycho-Pass, the light novel and anime Fate/Zero, and the 2013–2014 tokusatsu show Kamen Rider Gaim. He currently works at Nitroplus and Nitro+chiral. Anime written by Urobuchi that have won the Newtype Anime Awards have been Puella Magi Madoka Magica in 2011, Fate/Zero in 2012 and Psycho-Pass: The Movie in 2015.

== History ==
Urobuchi graduated from Wako University with a degree in History. He aspired to become a novelist and after seeing Shizuku and Kizuato by Leaf, he felt confident about the range of expression that games have. He then started working at Nitroplus and worked on Phantom of Inferno as his debut series. As of 2024, Urobuchi is the vice-president of Nitroplus.

== Writing style ==
In choosing names for the characters he develops, Urobuchi has stated that he shies away from selecting generic names that would match their personalities and instead opts for more unusual names that he believes would eliminate noise when fans try finding information on the characters with search engines. In a discussion with Urobuchi, manga writer Kazuo Koike contrasted this decision with the naming style in his own works, which emphasized more forthright names that were easier to remember. However, he found that Urobuchi's method could be effective for allowing viewers to "involve themselves deeper into the story and actively work to understand the characters." Urobuchi also said he attempts to keep at least one trait in common between each individual character and himself so that he can always identify with them on some level.

== Work ==
=== Visual novels ===
Year	Title	Developer	Platform(s)	Notes
2000	Phantom of Inferno	Nitroplus	Windows, Mac, DVD-PG, PS2, Xbox 360	Also director. Scenario and voice supervisor in latter ports.
2001	Vampirdzhija Vjedogonia (吸血殲鬼(ヴァンピルズィージャ)ヴェドゴニア)	Nitroplus	Windows	Also director and planner.
2002	Kikokugai: The Cyber Slayer (鬼哭街)	Nitroplus	Windows, Mac	Also director and planner.
2002	"Hello, world."	Nitroplus	Windows	Handled the original concept, planning and debug. Did not write scenario.
2003	Deus Machina Demonbane (斬魔大聖デモンベイン)	Nitroplus	Windows, PS2	Directed the original version, supervised. Did not write scenario.
2003	Jōka no Monshō (浄火の紋章; Emblem of the Sacred Flame)	Eerged	Windows	Takes place in the setting of Equilibrium, created by Kurt Wimmer.
2003	Saya no Uta (沙耶の唄; The Song of Saya)	Nitroplus	Windows, Android	Also director, supervisor.
2005	Togainu no Chi (咎狗の血; Blood of the Reprimanded Dog)	Nitro+chiral	Windows, PS2, PSP, Android, iOS	Handled direction and supervision. Did not write scenario.
2005	Jingai Makyō (塵骸魔京)	Nitroplus	Windows	Credited with "supervision". Did not write scenario.
2006	Kishin Hishou Demonbane (斬魔大聖デモンベイン)	Nitroplus	Windows	Only wrote the lyrics of the second opening theme. Did not write scenario.
2006	Lamento -BEYOND THE VOID-	Nitro+chiral	Windows	Credited with "game composition assistance". Did not write scenario.
2007	Tre Donne Crudeli (続・殺戮のジャンゴ ─地獄の賞金首─, Zoku Satsuriku no Django -Jigoku no Shoukinkubi-)	Nitroplus	Windows	Also handled planning.
2008	sweet pool	Nitro+chiral	Windows, PS Vita	Credited as advisor. Did not write scenario.
2015	Psycho-Pass: Mandatory Happiness (サイコパス 選択なき幸福)	5pb.	Xbox One, PS4, PS Vita, Windows	Handled project planning and supervision. Did not write scenario.

=== Manga ===
- Vampirdzhija Vjedogonia (with Tetsuya Sakata). Serialized in Comic Dragon, 2 volumes published by Dragon Comics (Kadokawa Shoten). August 2001, February 2002. ISBN 4049261774 ISBN 4049261936
- Ancient Misty (with Tetsuya Nakamura). Serialized in Dengeki Comic Gao!, 1 volume published by Dengeki Comics (MediaWorks). August 27, 2007. ISBN 978-4840240178

=== Sound dramas ===
- Kikokugai: The Cyber Slayer (2004) – Script
- Fate/Zero (2008–2013) – Original creator, script (anime BD boxsets bonus)

=== Light novels ===
Title	Illustrator	Publisher	Volumes	ISBN	Release date
Kikokugai: The Cyber Slayer (鬼哭街)	Higashiguchi Chūō	Kadokawa Sneaker Bunko (1st editions); Sai Zen Sen Fictions (Star Seas) (2nd edition)	2 "Violet Lightning Palm" (紫電掌) "Demon-Eyed Beauty" (鬼眼麗人); Single volume (2nd edition)	4-04-427809-1 (vol 1); 4-04-427810-5 (vol 2); 978-4-06-138955-7 (2nd edition)	December 25, 2004 (vol 1); February 2005 (vol 2); December 11, 2013 (2nd edition)
Hakubō no Dendōshi (白貌の伝道師)	kamiwata (1st edition); Akira Yasuda (2nd edition)	Nitroplus Books (1st edition); Sai Zen Sen Fictions (Star Seas) (2nd edition)	Single volume	4-902138-02-6 (1st edition); 4-061388-24-X (2nd edition)	December 29, 2004 (1st edition); March 15, 2012 (2nd edition)
Fate/Zero	Takashi Takeuchi	Type-Moon Books (1st edition); Sai Zen Sen Fictions (Star Seas) (2nd edition)	4 (1st edition) "The Untold Story of the Fourth Holy Grail War" (第四次聖杯戦争秘話) "The Mad Feast of Kings" (王たちの狂宴) "The Scattered Ones" (散りゆく者たち) "Flames of Purgatory" (煉獄の炎); 6 (2nd edition) vol 2 - "The Gathering of Spirits" (英霊参集) vol 5 - "The Quickening of Darkness" (闇の胎動)	978-4-06-138903-8; 978-4-06-138904-5; 978-4-06-138906-9; 978-4-06-138908-3; 978-4-06-138910-6; 978-4-06-138912-0 (2nd edition)	1st edition: December 29, 2006; March 31, 2007; July 27, 2007; December 29, 2007; 2nd edition: January 11, 2011; February 9, 2011; March 10, 2011; April 7, 2011; May 11, 2011; June 10, 2011
Black Lagoon (ブラック・ラグーン)	Rei Hiroe	Gagaga Bunko	2 "Shaitane Badi" (シェイターネ・バーディ) "Ballad of the Sinful Wizard" (罪深き魔術師の哀歌)	4-09-451079-6; 4-09-451249-7	July 18, 2008 (vol 1); January 18, 2011 (vol 2)
Eisen Flügel (アイゼンフリューゲル)	Higashiguchi Chūō	Gagaga Bunko	2	978-4-09-451146-8; 978-4-09-451180-2	July 17, 2009 (vol 1); December 18, 2009 (vol 2)
Kin no Hitomi to Tetsu no Ken (金の瞳と鉄の剣)	Yun Kōga	Sai Zen Sen Fictions (Star Seas)	Single volume	4-06-138802-9	April 14, 2011

=== Anime ===
==== Series ====
Year	Series	Studio	Role	Episodes	Scripts
2008	Blassreiter	Gonzo	Series composition, script	24	8 (10–12, 15–17, 22–23)
2009	Phantom: Requiem for the Phantom	Bee Train	Original scenario, script	26	3 (6, 18, 25)
2011	Puella Magi Madoka Magica	Shaft	Original creator, series composition, script	12	12
2011	Fate/Zero	Ufotable	Original creator, script supervision	13	—
2012	Fate/Zero (second season)	Ufotable	Original creator	12	—
2012	Psycho-Pass	Production I.G	Story concept, series composition, script	22	21 (all except 12)
2013	Gargantia on the Verdurous Planet	Production I.G	Story concept, series composition, script	13	2 (1, 13)
2014	Aldnoah.Zero	A-1 Pictures; Troyca	Original creator, script	12	3 (1–3)
2014	Psycho-Pass 2	Tatsunoko Production	Planning supervision, story concept	11	—
2015	Aldnoah.Zero (second season)	A-1 Pictures; Troyca	Original creator	12	—
2015	Gunslinger Stratos: The Animation	A-1 Pictures	Original scenario	12	—
2015	Chaos Dragon	Silver Link; Connect	Original creator	12	—
2015	Wooser's Hand-to-Mouth Life: Phantasmagoric Arc	Sanzigen	Script	13	1 (13)
2016	Concrete Revolutio: The Last Song	Bones	Script	11	1 (20)
2019	Obsolete	Buemon	Original creator, series composition, script	12	7 (1–4, 7, 9–10)
2022	RWBY: Ice Queendom	Shaft	Animation concept	12	—
2023	Revenger	Ajia-do Animation Works	Original scenario, series composition, script	12	7 (1–6, 8)
2028	Ghost of Tsushima: Legends	Kamikaze Douga	Series composition	TBA	

==== Movies ====
Year	Series	Studio	Role
2012	Puella Magi Madoka Magica: Beginnings	Shaft	Script
2012	Puella Magi Madoka Magica: Eternal	Shaft	Script
2013	Puella Magi Madoka Magica: Rebellion	Shaft	Script
2014	Expelled from Paradise	Graphinica	Script
2015	Psycho-Pass: The Movie	Production I.G	Story and script
2017	Godzilla: Planet of the Monsters	Polygon Pictures	Story and script
2018	Godzilla: City on the Edge of Battle	Polygon Pictures	Story and script
2018	Godzilla: The Planet Eater	Polygon Pictures	Story and script
2022	Bubble	Wit Studio	Script
2026	Puella Magi Madoka Magica: Walpurgisnacht: Rising	Shaft	Script
2026	Expelled from Paradise: Resonance from the Heart	Toei Animation	Script

=== Live action ===
==== Series ====
Year	Series	Studio	Role	Episodes	Scripts
2013	Kamen Rider Gaim	Toei	Series composition, script	47	44 (all except 30, 37, 47)
2016	Thunderbolt Fantasy	PILI	Chief supervision, script	51	51

==== Movies ====
Year	Series	Studio	Role
2014	Kamen Rider Gaim: Great Soccer Battle! Golden Fruits Cup!	Toei	Original creator, script supervision
2016	Garm Wars	Production I.G	Japanese script
2017	Thunderbolt Fantasy: The Sword of Life and Death	PILI	Original creator, chief supervision, script
2019	Thunderbolt Fantasy: Bewitching Melody of the West	PILI	Original creator, chief supervision, script
2025	Thunderbolt Fantasy: The Finale	PILI	Original creator, chief supervision, script

=== Video games ===
- Rusty Rabbit (2025) – Script

== Awards ==
Year	Award	Category	Work	Result
2011	1st Newtype Anime Awards	Best Screenplay	Puella Magi Madoka Magica	Won
2012	11th Tokyo Anime Awards	Best Screenplay	Puella Magi Madoka Magica	Won
2015	5th Newtype Anime Awards	Best Screenplay	Psycho-Pass: The Movie	Won
