= Ayano Yamamoto =

Japanese actress, voice actress, and idol

- 山本 彩乃
- Born: April 12, 1986 (age 40); Tokyo, Japan
- Occupations: Actress; voice actress; idol
- Years active: 2002–present
- Agent: Amuleto
- Notable work: Super Sonico as Super Sonico; Corpse Party as Naho Saenoki; Steins;Gate as Nae Tennōji
- Height: 157 cm (5 ft 2 in)

Ayano Yamamoto (山本 彩乃, Yamamoto Ayano; born April 12, 1986 in Tokyo) is a Japanese actress, voice actress and idol. She is affiliated with the agency Amuleto. She is known for her involvement in Nitroplus' franchise Super Sonico.

== Career ==
Yamamoto began her career as an idol in 2002. From 2005 to 2008, she was a member of the idol unit Pink Jam Princess, which she led. She had regular radio shows at Nippon Cultural Broadcasting beginning in January 2007. She made her voice acting debut in 2009, and signed to voice acting agency Mausu Promotion the following year, initially only for her voice acting career. She moved to Amuleto in 2014.

== Filmography ==
=== Anime ===
2009

- Nyan Koi! as Harumi (episode 11)

2010

- Angel Beats! as Female student (episode 6), Yuri's sister (episode 12)

2011

- Steins;Gate as Nae Tennōji
- Honto ni Atta! Reibai-Sensei as Emma, Tont
- Softenni as Girl A (episode 7)

2012

- Nukko. as Nukko
- Robotics;Notes as Nae Tennōji

2014

- SoniAni: Super Sonico The Animation as Super Sonico
- Dramatical Murder as Announcer
- Hanayamata as Arisa Kajiwara
- Robot Girls Z as General Brute's Manitou

2018

- Senran Kagura: Shinovi Master as Shiki

2019

- YU-NO: A Girl Who Chants Love at the Bound of this World as Marina

2022

- Irodorimidori as Nazuna Tennozu

=== OVA ===
2010

- Megane no Kanojo as Female student (episode 1); Female student A (episode 4); Maki (episode 3); Waitress (episode 2)

2013

- Corpse Party: Tortured Souls as Naho Saenoki

2015

- Senran Kagura: Estival Versus - Festival Eve Full of Swimsuits as Shiki

=== Games ===
2009

- Item Getter: Bokura no Kagaku to Mahō no Kankei
- Kimo Kawa E as Popular announcer
- Steins;Gate as Nae Tennōji
- Soukū no Frontier as Arisa
- Hakushaku to Yōsei
- Hyakko as Kobato Yomo
- Myself;Yourself: Sorezore no Finale as Sakuya Murayama
- Lucian Bee's Resurrection Supernova as Tapan

2010

- Corpse Party: Blood Covered Repeated Fear as Naho Saenoki

2011

- Wizardry Twinpack as Tanya
- Queen's Gate Spiral Chaos
- Corpse Party: Book of Shadows as Naho Saenoki
- Steins;Gate: Darling of Loving Vows as Nae Tennōji
- Hakuisei Renai Shoukougun as Kohaku
- Meikyū no Cross Blade as Shizuna Minase
- Yakuza: Dead Souls as Kazumi

2012

- Corpse Party the Anthology: Sachiko's Game of Love - Hysteric Birthday 2U as Naho Saenoki
- Star + One! as Eris Mashiro
- Fire Emblem Awakening as Sumia & Cynthia
- Robotics;Notes as Nae Tennōji

2013

- Kaihō Shōjo SIN as Olga
- Senran Kagura Shinovi Versus as Shiki
- Meikyū no Cross Blade Infinity as Shizuna Minase

2014

- Corpse Party: Blood Drive as Naho Saenoki
- Senran Kagura Bon Appétit! as Shiki
- Tokyo 7th Sisters as Yumeno Sakaiya
- Rensa Hannō as Akane Ayazaki

2015

- Irodori Midori as Nazuna Tennōsu
- Valkyrie Drive: Bhikkhuni as Mankupumaru-chan
- Corpse Party: Blood Covered Repeated Fear 3DS as Naho Saenoki
- Steins;Gate 0 as Nae Tennōji
- Nitroplus Blasterz: Heroines Infinite Duel as Super Sonico
- Settai Gaigeki Wars as Monari
- Senran Kagura: Estival Versus as Shiki
- MapleStory Black Heaven as Cygnus

2016

- YU-NO: A Girl Who Chants Love at the Bound of this World as Female guard

2017

- Fire Emblem Heroes as Sumia & Cynthia
- Cyberdimension Neptunia: 4 Goddesses Online as †Kuronekohime†
- Senran Kagura: Peach Beach Splash as Shiki & Super Sonico
- Shinobi Master Senran Kagura: New Link as Shiki

2018

- Senran Kagura Burst Re:Newal as Shiki

2022

- Anonymous;Code as Bambi Kurashina
