= Super Sonico =

Fictional character created for Nitroplus

- Sonico as she appears in the anime series

すーぱーそに子 (Sūpā Soniko)
- Manga

Super Sonicomic
- Published by: Enterbrain
- Magazine: Magi-Cu
- Original run: N\A – present
- Volumes: 1
- Manga

Super Sonico SoniKoma
- Written by: Chika Nonohara
- Published by: Earth Star Entertainment
- Magazine: Comic Earth Star
- Original run: March 12, 2011 – 2014
- Volumes: 1
- Video game

SoniComi
- Developer: Nitroplus
- Publisher: JP: Nitroplus, Enterbrain; WW: JAST USA
- Genre: Visual novel
- Platform: Microsoft Windows
- Released: JP: November 25, 2011; WW: July 1, 2016
- Manga

SoniComi
- Written by: Imusanjo
- Published by: Mag Garden
- Magazine: Monthly Comic Blade
- Original run: 2012 – 2014
- Volumes: 5
- Video game

SoniPro
- Developer: Nitroplus, Imageepoch
- Publisher: Nitroplus
- Genre: Idol management
- Platform: Nintendo 3DS
- Released: July 31, 2014
- Video game

Motto! SoniComi
- Developer: Nitroplus
- Publisher: Nitroplus
- Genre: Visual Novel
- Platform: PlayStation 3
- Released: March 20, 2014
- Anime television series

SoniAni: Super Sonico The Animation
- Directed by: Kenichi Kawamura
- Produced by: Gaku Iwasa; Kazuyoshi Fukuba; Nobuhiro Osawa; Yoshinao Doi
- Written by: Yōsuke Kuroda
- Music by: Go Sakabe
- Studio: White Fox
- Licensed by: AUS: Hanabee; NA: Sentai Filmworks; SEA: Muse Communication; UK: MVM Films
- Original network: AT-X, Sun TV, Tokyo MX, KBS, TV Aichi, BS11
- English network: US: Anime Network
- Original run: January 6, 2014 – March 24, 2014
- Episodes: 12
- Manga

Super Sonicomic Meshi
- Written by: Super☆Kuriko
- Published by: Nihon Bungeisha
- Magazine: Comic Heaven
- Original run: 2017 – 2019
- Volumes: 1

Super Sonico (Japanese: すーぱーそに子, Hepburn: Sūpā Soniko) is a fictional character created by Tsuji Santa for the Japanese video game company Nitroplus, first appearing as a mascot for a Nitroplus-sponsored music festival in 2006. Nitroplus has since developed the character into a media franchise that includes music products, manga series, computer and video games, toy figurines, and other merchandise. An anime television series by White Fox based on the character aired in Japan between January and March 2014.

== Characters ==
=== Super Sonico ===
Voiced by: Ayano Yamamoto (Note: Credited as Super Sonico) (Japanese); Jessica Nigri (English)

Super Sonico is a fictional character created by Tsuji Santa of Nitroplus. Her debut appearance was on October 14, 2006, as the mascot for Nitroplus' annual live music festival event "Nitro Super Sonico", which took place at Shiba Park in Minato-KU. Nitroplus was initially focused on computer games based on visual novels, but every year since 2000, they have also held a music festival.

Sonico appears in various media as an eighteen-year-old college student. She is depicted as an attractive young woman with light peach skin, large red eyes, and straight, light pink hair. She keeps her hair long in the back and in the front. She is always shown wearing her signature headphones. Her depictions show much variation in her facial features and body proportions between the different artists, while always keeping her trademark traits: headphones, pink hair color, and large bust. She also appears as a popular gravure idol as well as the vocalist and guitarist of the fictional band First Astronomical Velocity (第一宇宙速度, Daiichi Uchū Sokudo, literally first escape velocity). Sonico also studies marine biology at Musasaka University and lives in Mushashino-shi, Tokyo. She is prone to sleep a lot, often requiring help to wake up, and her favorite foods are macarons. Her bandmates refer to her as "Nico".

=== Associated characters ===
Suzu Fujimi (富士見 鈴, Fujimi Suzu)
Voiced by: Mai Goto (Japanese); Luci Christian (English)
The young female founder and bassist of the band First Astronomical Velocity. She has light green eyes and straight, long black hair. She is of average height and build but appears thin next to Fuuri and Sonico. She is often seen wearing a pink nurse's uniform and often attempts to dress up Sonico in dubious outfits.

Fuuri Watanuki (綿抜 フウリ, Watanuki Fūri)
Voiced by: Mami Ozaki (Japanese); Monica Rial (English)
The young female drummer of the First Astronomical Velocity band. She has a full figure, violet eyes, and short, wavy brown hair. She is shy and good-natured and is usually seen either eating or sleeping when not playing in the band. She and Suzu first appeared in Nitroplus' 2010 visual novel computer game Axanael.

Manager Kitamura (北村 マネージャー, Kitamura Manējā)
Voiced by: Ryōta Takeuchi (Japanese); David Wald (English)
Sonico's manager, a tall man with orange-yellow flame-styled hair who is always wearing a hannya mask and carrying a katana on his back under his coat. He is particularly protective of Sonico, ready to strike at anyone threatening or attempting something inappropriate with her. When not defending Sonico, he is friendly. Despite his demon mask, he is sociable, talkative, and actively seeking modeling work for Sonico, sometimes overcommitting her.

Ouka Satsurikuin (殺戮院 鏖禍, Satsurikuin Ōka)
Voiced by: Hisako Kanemoto (Japanese); Kira Vincent-Davis (English)
Nitroplus' former mascot, who is seen in the Super Sonico Animation. Ouka serves as Sonico's co-worker at the modeling agency. She is a tween-age girl of short stature and slight build. She has short orange hair; her right eye color is orange; and she wears a riveted brown leather eye patch over her left eye. She wears a frilled tiara on her head, with grooved silver disks that cover her ears. She is confident, extroverted, and constantly looking for her spot in the limelight. However, she is inexperienced with handling clients, and unlike Sonico, she does not have a protective manager, so she often ends up in bad predicaments.

== Toys ==
A popular and extensive line of PVC figurines of Super Sonico has been produced for Nitroplus by well-known toy designers, including, among many others, Max Factory, FREEing, Orchid Seed, and Hobby Japan. Figurine styles have included the highly stylized Chibi, Nendoroid, and Figma designs, in addition to the more realistic designs drawn directly from the character as she appears in games, manga, and anime. Sizes have ranged from 1/8 to 1/2 the size of the young adult woman character as she appears in the media. Action figures have also been produced.

== Media ==
=== Music CDs ===
To date, there have been six singles and three albums released featuring Sonico.

Singles

- SUPERORBITAL (released November 24, 2010; GRN-021): First studio single and first theme song for the PC game SoniComi.
- Passion Rocket (情熱ロケット, Jōnetsu rocket; released 19 January 2011; GRN-023): Second single introduced at the 2010 Summer Comiket, also as an insert song from the adult PC game Axanael by Nitroplus.
- Power (ぱわー; released April 30, 2011): A solo single sold on the iTunes Store and Amazon MP3 to raise revenue for earthquake relief following the 2011 Tōhoku earthquake and tsunami.
- Advance, BLUE STAR! (進め、BLUE STAR！, Susume, BLUE STAR!; released May 24, 2011; GRN-026): Third single released in collaboration with Earth Star Entertainment's Comic Earth Star as the theme song of the magazine. The single was used to collect aid funds for earthquake relief.
- VISION (released July 29, 2011; GRN-027): Fourth single as the second theme song to SoniComi.
- Phantom Vibration! (ファントム・ヴァイブレーション！; released December 29, 2011; GRN-029): Debut solo single. The single included an additional costume patch for the PC game SoniComi on the CD-ROM.

Albums

- GALAXY ONE (released November 11, 2011; GRN-028): First studio album.
- Love & II+ (released June 27, 2012; GRN-030): First Cosmic Velocity's 2nd album that contains three discs with Love&II+ LIVE gokko!, Love&II+, and SoniComi: Communication with Sonico Original Soundtrack.
- SONICONICOROCK Tribute to VOCALOID: Third studio album containing vocal covers of assorted Vocaloid songs.

=== Manga ===
A 4koma manga series titled Super Sonicomic (すーぱーそにこみっく) was featured in Enterbrain's Magi-Cu. Another 4koma manga series by Chika Nonohara titled Super Sonico SoniKoma began serialization on March 12, 2011, in Comic Earth Star. Another manga series titled Sonicomi, with art by Imusanjo, was serialized in the Monthly Comic Blade.

=== Games ===
==== SoniComi (2011/2016, PC) ====
SoniComi (ソニコミ; full title Communication with Sonico) is a computer game for Microsoft Windows released on November 25, 2011, developed by Nitroplus and published by Nitroplus and Enterbrain. As a visual novel game, the player takes on the role of Sonico's cameraman. The game features events where the player is able to take gravure photographs of her. A PlayStation 3 adaptation with improved visuals, titled Motto! SoniComi (モット！ ソニコミ; full title More Communication with Sonico), was released on March 20, 2014. The PS3 version received a Famitsu score of 30/40. The game was released worldwide with an English translation by JAST USA through Steam, featuring dubbed voice by Jessica Nigri.

==== SoniPro (2014, 3DS) ====
SoniPro (ソニプロ; full title Super Sonico in Production) is a game developed by Nitroplus and Imageepoch for the Nintendo 3DS, announced during the 2013 Wonder Festival. As an idol-producing game, the player takes on the role of Sonico's producer, who aims to train her to become an idol. The game was released on July 31, 2014.

Famitsu gave SoniPro a review score of 30/40.

==== Appearances in other games ====
Sonico has made cameo appearances in various games, including Le Ciel Bleu, the visual novels Shiny Days and Lovesick Puppies, the Japanese online games Web Knight Carnival, Mechanical Girl War Z, Dragon League, Dungeons Lord, Momoiro Daisen Pylon, Blue Sky Dragon Guild, and Super Heroine Chronicle. Sonico appears as a character within the eroge Axanael developed by Nitroplus. She also appears in Square Enix's Kaku-San-Sei Million Arthur between March 11 and March 23, 2014. Super Sonico and Ōka appear in the Nitroplus Blasterz: Heroines Infinite Duel fighting game, appearing as a support character in the arcade version and as a playable character in the console version, while the latter is playable in all versions. Sonico also appeared in Senran Kagura: Peach Beach Splash as one of the DLC characters, along with the three characters from Koei Tecmo/Team Ninja's Dead or Alive series, four characters from the manga Ikki Tousen, two characters from Valkyrie Drive, and the titular character of Idea Factory's Hyperdimension Neptunia.

=== Anime ===
An anime television series titled SoniAni: Super Sonico The Animation (そにアニ) was announced at the Nitro Super Sonic 2013 event held at the Tokyo International Forum. Produced by White Fox, the 12-episode series aired in Japan between January 6, 2014, and March 24, 2014, and was simulcast by Crunchyroll. A DVD and Blu-ray release of the TV series in Japan was announced for March 19, 2014. Sentai Filmworks has licensed the series in North America. It was released on Blu-ray Disc and DVD on May 26, 2015. The Anime Network began streaming the series on February 6, 2014. MVM Films has licensed the series in the United Kingdom. In Australia and New Zealand, Hanabee licensed the series within the region. Muse Communication licensed the series in Southeast Asia and streamed on Muse Asia YouTube channel.

The main opening song of the anime is "SuperSoni♥" (すぱそにっ♥, SupaSoni♥) by Super Sonico (Ayano Yamamoto). The opening theme for episode one is "Beat Goes On" by Yamamoto, while a different ending theme, each performed by First Astronomical Velocity (Yamamoto, Mai Goto, and Mami Ozaki), is featured in each episode.

==== Episode list ====
No.	Title	Ending Theme	Original release date
1	"I'll Do My Bets~♪ [sic]" Transliteration: "Ganbarimausyo~♪" (Japanese: がんばりまうsよ～♪)	"Love the World" by First Astronomical Velocity	January 6, 2014
Sonico wakes up late and prepares food for her pet cats. She meets people as she rushes towards the college and still ends up late to class. Her professor praises her intellect but criticizes her tardiness. After class, she attends a photo shoot with a lecherous client. After an array of photos, the client requests Sonico wear a much more revealing outfit, but thanks to the intervention of Mr. Kitamura, Sonico's manager, she does not. After the photo shoot, she helps wait on customers at her grandmother's bar, where a baseball team is their regular patron, giving praise to Sonico's growth. After a phone call from her bandmates, she meets up with Suzu, the bassist, and Fuuri, the drummer. They practice a new song that Suzu composed.
2	"First Astronomical Velocity"; Transliteration: "Daiichi Uchū Sokudo" (Japanese: 第一宇宙速度)	"Sky Love Hurricane" (スカイラブハリケーン, Sukai Rabu Harikēn) by First Astronomical Velocity	January 13, 2014
Sonico is preparing for a concert with her band, First Astronomical Velocity, but things prove troublesome when a sudden modeling job comes into play.
3	"Sonico Goes to Okinawa"; Transliteration: "Soniko, Okinawa ni Iku" (Japanese: そに子、沖縄に行く)	"Summer Illusion" (サマーイリュージョン, Samā Iryūjon) by First Astronomical Velocity	January 20, 2014
Sonico goes to Okinawa for a modeling shoot. The first day, she meets all the staff and has dinner with them. The manager, Kitamura, shows Sonico back to her room so she can get some rest and is invited to go drinking by the client. Another man approaches when he hears Kitamura speaking so highly of his model. The next afternoon, after the photo shoot, the man calls Kitamura to remind him that he agreed to Sonico appearing in an action series shooting that evening. Unfortunately, while watching Sonico during the filming, Kitamura's protective instincts kicked in, resulting in him becoming the unwilling superhero star of that week's TV show episode.
4	"Daydream"; Transliteration: "Deidorīmu" (Japanese: デイドリーム)	"Moonlight de Buttebase! ~Moonlight Star~" (ムーンライトでぶっとばせ! 〜MOONLIGHT STAR〜, Mūnraito de Buttobase! ~Moonlight Star~) by First Astronomical Velocity	January 27, 2014
Sonico gets a postcard from someone with no sender written on it. It seems to be from a tropical location, and there's only a few words printed. Sonico remembers her past. Everything started when she was into rock in middle school. She couldn't express herself honestly and with as much power as a rock musician, so she wanted to be like one. She finds an upperclassman who sets her on her path to stardom by giving her a guitar named "Daydream".
5	"New World"	"Crystal Dream" (クリスタル・ドリーム, Kurisutaru Dorīmu) by First Astronomical Velocity	February 3, 2014
A woman editor working for a local magazine is directed (over her protests) to write an article on Sonico as part of a series on celebrities that live locally. She does not expect Sonico and her manager to agree to direct observation, but they do, feeling that it is important to have local exposure. So the editor spends the day observing Sonico, expecting the famous model to be shallow and self-absorbed. However, she finds Sonico to be a typical college student, and her classmates are mostly unaware that Sonico is a famous model. While waiting in Sonico's bedroom, the editor finds a notebook of Sonico's compositions and comes to respect Sonico's dedication to her music, her band, and her bandmates. This forces the editor to reflect on how she is living her own life.
6	"Cruising of the Dead"; Transliteration: "Kurūjingu obu za Deddo" (Japanese: クルージング・オブ・ザ・デッド)	"Nightmare Buster" (ナイトメア・バスター, Naitomea Basutā) by First Astronomical Velocity	February 10, 2014
Ouka Satsurikuin, Sonico's co-worker at the modeling agency, gets a job as the spokesperson for a new fat-reducing ointment. Ouka invites Sonico, Suzu, and Fuuri to join her on a VIP cruise to celebrate the product's launch. In a private cabin, the ointment company's owner is confronted by one of her own staff, concerned that the product has had insufficient testing. She proceeds with the product release anyway. Ouka's roll-out presentation goes very well, with samples given to attendees who are pleased with the immediate results. That night, however, Ouka, Sonico, and her bandmates find themselves on the run from the other passengers, who have effectively become zombies from the ointment's side effects and are desperately hungry. With the cruise ship out at sea, there are few places they can go to get away, which they must do until the effects of the cream wear off.
7	"Star Rain"; Transliteration: "Sutā Rein" (Japanese: スターレイン)	"Star Rain" (スターレイン, Sutā Rein) by First Astronomical Velocity	February 17, 2014
Sonico goes on a trip for some lyrical inspiration, conversing with another woman on the way to her stopover in Niigata. While stopping over in Tainai City, Sonico comes across a glassmaker, who teaches her to make a little accessory. The next day, Sonico heads towards the local hot springs, meeting people and encountering many sights along the way. After checking into the hot springs and taking a dip, she tries to find her way to an observatory but gets lost in the woods. However, she manages to follow a raccoon to the observatory, becoming awed by the starlit sky.
8	"Super Sonico Murder Case"; Transliteration: "Sūpā Soniko Satsujin Jiken" (Japanese: すーぱーそに子殺人事件)	"Shinjitsu no Hikari" (真実のヒカリ, The Light of Truth) by First Astronomical Velocity	February 24, 2014
As First Astronomical Velocity gets together at the Supernova studio to rehearse for an upcoming concert, Sonico is found allegedly "murdered" inside a locked waiting room, though they are relieved to find she had only fallen unconscious. Just then, Suzu's younger sister, Ena, appears, deciding she wants to investigate the mystery and coming up with ludicrous theories over who Sonico's "murderer" is. They soon discover that Sonico's guitar has gone missing, which soon leads to Ena becoming implicated in the crime herself. In the end, they find the guitar on the stage, and Sonico's fall was simply an accident. Later, after Sonico and the others take their leave, Ena confronts Supernova's maid, Miina, who had lied about the room being locked by Sonico to keep the others from discovering she had broken an amp.
9	"Sonico's Longest Day"; Transliteration: "Soniko no Ichiban Nagai Hi" (Japanese: そに子の一番長い日)	"Go! Go!" (ゴー! ゴー!, Gō! Gō!) by First Astronomical Velocity	March 3, 2014
Sonico and her classmates participate in a college fair, starting off by helping out at a sailor maid café. Her schedule soon becomes busier when she is asked to fill in for both the Light Music Club's guitarist and Ouka's modeling work, due to both of them falling ill. She soon learns she has been entered into a beauty contest, which coincides with her mini-concert, while the café suddenly requests her help at the same time. With Sonico torn between the three jobs, Suzu and Fuuri disguise themselves as Sonico to fill in for her at the café and contest, while Sonico herself performs in the concert. With all the commotion settled, Sonico holds her marine biology exhibit for all the children.
10	"Ramen and a Little Rice"; Transliteration: "Rāmen ni Han Raisu" (Japanese: ラーメンに半ライス)	"Affection" by First Astronomical Velocity	March 10, 2014
Sonico takes in a stray Munchkin cat, which she names Rice, to join her five other cats: Roasty, Porky, Noodles, Fishcake, and Tasty. However, Rice doesn't seem to get along well with the other cats and seems more interested in escaping Sonico's apartment. One day, Rice makes a break out of the apartment in search of its owner, so Sonico and the other cats head off in search of him. Rice is soon cornered by a hostile dog, but the other cats soon come to his rescue, getting him safely to Sonico, who returns him to his owner's house to reunite with his mother. Afterward, Rice pays a visit to Sonic's apartment to spend some time with his new cat friends.
11	"A Saint Comes to Town"; Transliteration: "Seija ga Machi ni Yattekuru" (Japanese: 聖者が街にやってくる)	"Very Merry" (ベリメリ, Beri Meri) by First Astronomical Velocity	March 17, 2014
With Christmas approaching, the Musatani Shopping Center finds itself up against a giant department store that has appeared recently. Suzu, who is asked to help bring younger customers to the shopping center, has Sonico, Fuuri, and various others act as Santa girls to appeal to customers and increase sales. When the department store responds by employing some popular idols to draw the customers away, Suzu decides they need an official Santa Claus to appear on Christmas Eve to appeal to parents and children. On her way home, Sonico encounters a young girl named Ayaka, who is upset about her father not being able to come home in time for Christmas. On Christmas Eve, Sonico brings Ayaka to meet Santa, who turns out to be Ayaka's father, bringing her the present she wanted the most.
12	"We're Right Here♪"; Transliteration: "Koko ni Imausu♪" (Japanese: ここにいまうs♪)	"SUPERORBITAL" by First Astronomical Velocity	March 24, 2014
First Astronomical Velocity decides to hold a concert for New Year's Eve, but Suzu ends up overspending her budget, leaving them with no money for speakers. Wanting to go ahead with the concert, each of the members asks for favors from their friends and neighbors to help put the concert together, even helping to stream it on the internet. Although the concert gets off to a good start, the strings on Sonico's guitar break midway through the performance. However, her grandmother, Leila, manages to save the day with her own guitar, buying time for Sonico to replace the strings. Looking back over the past year, Sonico and all her friends and supporters see the new year together.

=== Other media ===
Gravure books featuring Sonico were released by Enterbrain on July 7, 2011. An internet radio show, SoniRadio (そにっくらじお♪), began broadcasting on March 24, 2011. A Sonico-themed non-game networking software application for iOS has also been released.

Super Sonico was also a VTuber once on YouTube, hosting the channel called Sonico.Ch (すーぱーそに子ちゃんねる), a YouTube channel in collaboration between Nitroplus and Wright Flyer Live Entertainment. In 2020, Sonico's message on Twitter stated retirement as a VTuber, and she hosted a farewell stream on both YouTube and Reality (a Japanese smartphone application, and live stream platform).

== Endorsements ==
Sonico was used to promote the International Exhibition Center station of the Tokyo Waterfront Area Rapid Transit Rinkai Line. She is also being used to promote the Soni Plateau (曽爾高原, Soni Kougen) brand of beer from Nara Prefecture as a collaboration based on the similar-sounding name. Sonico was also the mascot for the 2013 Anitamasai Convention in Saitama.

The Super Sonico Tab is a special edition ASUS MeMo Pad ME172v tablet computer featuring the artwork of Sonico on the rear of the device.
