= Touhou LostWord =

2020 role-playing video game

- Developer: NextNinja
- Publisher: Good Smile Company
- Platforms: Android, iOS
- Release: JP: April 30, 2020; TW/HK/MO: October 26, 2020; WW: May 11, 2021; CHN: September 30, 2021
- Genres: Role-playing video game, gacha
- Mode: Single-player

Touhou LostWord (Japanese: 東方LostWord、東方ロストワード) is a free-to-play mobile Touhou fangame developed in 2020 by NextNinja, and published by Good Smile Company. The game is licensed by Team Shanghai Alice, the publisher of the official Touhou games.

== Gameplay ==
Reimu Hakurei performing her Last Word, Fantasy Nature.

Touhou LostWord is a role-playing video game in which the player creates a party, consisting of six characters. The player must defeat waves of enemies in turn-based battles, located within stages, in order to progress forwards and unlock new stages.

Each of the characters have a total of six attributes that determine their combat effectiveness: HP, agility, yin attack, yin defense, yang attack, and yang defense. Additionally, each of the characters have multiple spell cards, which can be used multiple times per stage, and one last word – the last words are more powerful than the regular spell cards, but if they are used, regular spell cards can no longer be used that stage.

Story cards are items that can be equipped to further empower spell cards, as well as improve the characters' attributes. Characters can also level up by engaging in services, such as attending a school or dojo. Completing these services will earn the player coins, which can be used to upgrade their characters, or acquire new ones. Services are also a primary source of spirit power – the game version of gacha stamina, which is required to perform any task in the game. As part of the game's gacha system, the player can purchase coins and spirit power through in-app purchases.

== Plot ==
In Touhou LostWord, the "Lost Word Incident" occurs, causing words to go missing, which threatens the stability of Gensokyo, and leads the characters to investigate by travelling across multiple different universes to find the lost words.

== Development ==
Pre-registration of the Japanese version of Touhou LostWord began in July 2019, and the game was released in Japan on April 30, 2020. In October, the game's international release was announced, which coincided with the launch of the game's website and social media accounts. Touhou LostWord opened for international pre-registration in November 2020, and was released on May 11, 2021. A Simplified Chinese version of the game has been released on September 30, 2021.

The game's opening song, "Lost Word Chronicle", was performed by Kanako Itō, and had been watched over 5 million times on YouTube by May 2021. Other musicians who have performed for Touhou LostWord include Toshihiko Tahara, nano, and Kishida Kyoudan & The Akeboshi Rockets.

== Reception ==
Touhou LostWord was a runner-up in the 2020 Google Play 'Exciting' award, losing to Dragon Quest Tact. On June 3, 2021, TouchArcade listed Touhou LostWord as one of the best App Store games released the previous week.
