= Full Metal Daemon: Muramasa =

Japanese visual novel (video game)

- Developer: Nitroplus
- Publisher: Nitroplus
- Artist: Namaniku ATK
- Writer: Ittetsu Narahara
- Composer: ZIZZ
- Platform: Windows
- Release: JP: October 30, 2009; WW: August 25, 2021
- Genre: Visual novel
- Mode: Single-player

Full Metal Daemon: Muramasa (装甲悪鬼村正, Sōkō Akki Muramasa) is a Japanese visual novel developed and published by Nitroplus for Windows. It was released in Japan on October 30, 2009. An English localisation by JAST USA was released on August 25, 2021. The game is regarded as a masterpiece in the visual novel community. It is also one of JAST USA's most successful releases.

== Plot ==
In the story, a Tsurugi (劔冑) is a set of armor forged from a living soul. It's among the most powerful weapons in the world. Those who wear the armour are called Musha (武者) – warriors with the power of flight and blades able to beat steel.

In the island nation of Yamato, governed by the Rokuhara Shogunate in the first half of the 20th century, rumors of a Musha clad in silver armor, only known as Ginseigo, the Silver Star, begin to spread calling them a tyrant and despoiler.

One Musha, an old nemesis of the Silver Star, uses a crimson Tsurugi called Muramasa in his quest to bring them down. However, his Tsurugi comes with a dark past when five centuries ago it brought about a great calamity on the land.

== Characters ==
=== Main characters ===
Minato Kageaki

Voiced by: Takuma Terashima as "Yuusuke Ishikawa"

A young man secretly working under orders from the prince to subjugate the Silver Star. His Tsurugi is Muramasa. While on a mission, he introduces himself as a policeman working part-time for the Kamakura Police Department; under normal circumstances, he spends his days in his cell at the Kamakura Detention House as an unconvicted prisoner due to committing a variety of crimes, including matricide.

While his outward appearance might indicate a person of dark and melancholic demeanor, in reality, Kageaki is a kind and honest young man. He acts as an airhead from time to time, much to the surprise of his peers.

Due to the various murders, he had committed under the tormenting influence of the curse known as the "counterbalance of good and evil", he views himself as a monster, his blade deep crimson with the blood of innocents. While he is well-versed in the art of war, he is by no means an expert combatant.

His reason for using Muramasa is twofold: for one, Muramasa is the only Tsurugi capable of withstanding the corruption of the Silver Star's "eggs"; additionally, he feels it is his duty as a brother to put an end to his sister's atrocities. His final wish upon finally defeating the Silver Star is to be judged and executed for all his sins.

Muramasa

Voiced by: Shimazaki Haruka as "Ayana Sumoto"

Third-generation Seishuusengou Uemon-no-jou Muramasa. Female. She was once housed in the depths of the Minato residence, but due to various circumstances, made a contract with Kageaki. The two of them are now working together as partners in stopping the Silver Star.

Her body is of steel, a characteristic that is reflected in her cold demeanor. However, she is more attentive toward Kageaki, who is deeply tormented by his curse. She became a Tsurugi in order to prevent her mother from being melted down as punishment for the unimaginable bloodshed she had caused during the Nanboku-chō wars; by becoming a Tsurugi, Muramasa was to watch over her mother, and stop her should she awaken to bring calamity upon the land once again. She is also acting out of a deep sense of guilt because her mother, the Silver Star, was the very being who had previously destroyed Kageaki's peaceful daily existence. However, she had never once voiced these feelings.

Although she adheres to the tenets of the "counterbalance of good and evil" that her mother and grandfather also followed, she, too, is tormented by constant feelings of guilt. During her mortal years, she was a stunning dark-skinned beauty. However, this was mainly due to the increased growth rate of Emishi, and in reality, Muramasa is much younger than what her outward appearance would suggest. Because of this, she can be somewhat naive and childish at times. In one of the game's routes, she gains the ability to turn into her human form once again and ends up showing a more emotional side of herself.

In particular, she has absolutely no experience in matters of the heart. One time, when Kageaki decides to clean her armor on a whim, she mistakes it for a genuine sexual assault and cries out in tears; another time, when Kageaki reaches out to her with kindness, she is too shaken up to answer and merely continues to tremble in silence.

== Development ==
Full Metal Daemon: Muramasa was written by Japanese scenario writer and Ko-ryū kenjutsu expert Narahara Ittetsu. It was the last game he wrote before leaving Nitroplus. Much like his earlier game Hanachirasu, it is also set in an alternate history, although it's not set in the same universe as Hanachirasu. The game also serves as a commemoration of Nitroplus' 10th anniversary and was the first Nitroplus game to use widescreen as well as vertical writing. The music group ZIZZ STUDIO composed the soundtrack for the game, art was handled by NamanikuATK, the tsurugi designs were done by Ishiwata Makoto, and the game was produced by Digitaro and Shima Nagare, the latter of whom is the scenario writer for Project VERMILLION.

J-List opened up preorders for the Western Collector's Edition for the game on August 20, 2021, featuring a 7" vinyl soundtrack record, art book, guidebook, happi coat, and a game DVD.

Full Metal Daemon: Muramasa was released in English on the JAST USA store and GOG on August 24, 2021. Valve denied to allow the game to release on Steam as it did not meet their content guidelines. In October of 2022, after Valve reassessed and allowed Chaos;Head Noah, another visual novel game, to launch on their platform after it had previously been disallowed, fans of Muramasa petitioned for Valve to reconsider its release as well. JAST later announced that despite the interest, Valve had told them they would not reconsider their decision.

== Music ==
Along with the soundtrack, the game features the opening song "MURAMASA" performed by Masatoshi Ono, the insert song UZUKI by VERTUEUX, and the ending songs "Rakuyou", "Fuel My Soul" and "The Call" by Kanako Itō, Kazuhiro Watanabe and Yukky, respectively. A music single containing MURAMASA, UZUKI, and The Call was released on September 18, 2009.

== Additional Media ==
Full Metal Daemon Muramasa: -Kotono's Tsurugi- (装甲悪鬼村正 -琴乃の劔冑-, Sōkō Akki Muramasa Kotono no Tsurugi) A side-story novella serialized in Monthly Hobby Japan in 2009, written by Naruki Nagakawa with art by Takeya Takayuki, Junichi Takaguchi, and Takashi Yamaguchi. The story concerns Kotono Takizawa, a mechanic who desires to make the perfect Tsurugi.

Full Metal Daemon Muramasa: Evil Intent Chapter (装甲悪鬼村正 邪念編, Sōkō Akki Muramasa Janen Hen) a DVD released in 2010 containing bonus material and three official side-stories, one set during the main story, one set afterwards, and one comedic tale.

Full Metal Daemon Muramasa: Massacre (装甲悪鬼村正 鏖, Sōkō Akki Muramasa Minagoroshi) A single-volume manga serialized in Monthly Champion Red in 2010, written by Kenji Yamamoto and illustrated by Hiro Seshuu. Taking place before the events of the prologue, Minato travels to an isolated island where four old Tsurugi are kept.

Full Metal Daemon Muramasa: Demon World Chapter (装甲悪鬼村正 魔界編, Sōkō Akki Muramasa Makai Hen) a five-volume manga serialized in Monthly Comic Blade from 2010 to 2014, written by Midori Gotou (from Production I.G.), illustrated by Gunzi, with production assistance from Nitroplus. The manga takes place after the events of the Demon Route True End and deals with Minato fighting various Musha from the past.

Full Metal Daemon Muramasa: Hero Chapter (装甲悪鬼村正 英雄編, Sōkō Akki Muramasa Eiyuu Hen) a three-volume manga serialized in Kadokawa Comics A in 2011, written by Keiichiro Daichi and illustrated by Isii. The story follows Ichigo's point of view during the Hero Route.

Full Metal Daemon Muramasa: ~Secret Story of the Demon Armor: STEEL~ (装甲悪鬼村正~妖甲秘聞 鋼~, Sōkō Akki Muramasa ~Youkou Hibun Hagane~) a spin-off novel with an accompanying audio drama released in 2010, written by Jin Haganeya with art by NamanikuATK. A prequel novel, which greatly extends Muramasas backstory from the Visual Novel. It shows the impact of the Muramasa tsurugi, and how they came to be known as Demon Armors in the conflict between the Northern and Southern Courts during the Nanboku-cho period, which would be known to later generations as "hell".

Full Metal Daemon Muramasa: Space Chapter (装甲悪鬼村正 宇宙編, Sōkō Akki Muramasa Uchuu Hen) a spin-off novel published in 2015 with art by Isii and written by Chikashi Yoshida.

Full Metal Daemon Muramasa: Atonement Chapter (装甲悪鬼村正 贖罪編, Sōkō Akki Muramasa Shokuzai Hen) a free-download entry on Nitroplus' website in 2016. Written by a fan of the series and chosen by popular vote. Taking place after the Demon Route True End, it features Minato's adoptive father Kikuchi searching for Minato.

A sequel tentatively titled Project VERMILLION is under development.
