= You and Me and Her: A Love Story =

2013 visual novel

- Promo art
- Developer: Nitroplus
- Platform: Windows
- Release: JP: June 28, 2013; WW: 2020
- Genre: Visual novel

You and Me and Her: A Love Story (Note: Japanese: 君と彼女と彼女の恋, Hepburn: Kimi to Kanojo to Kanojo no Koi; lit. 'The Love Between You, Her, and Her') is a 2013 eroge visual novel. Developed by Nitroplus, the game is about a Shinichi Susuki, a self-described loser who is caught between two romantic interests in his life: a strange young woman named Aoi Mukou who believes to receive messages from God that tells her she's a character in a romantic visual novel, and Miyuki who is Shinichi's childhood friend and the most popular girl at school. As Shinichi, the player must initially choose which girl to pursue romantically.

The game was released in Japan on June 28, 2013 and was localized for English-language audiences in 2020. Joshua Roorda of Hardcore Gaming 101 said that game did not gain much widespread recognition in the United States until this later release.

While released in both a version with and without erotic scenes, academics Mark Kretzschmar and Sara Raffel wrote in their book The History and Allure of Interactive Visual Novels that You and Me and Her was a rare eroge, or erotic game, that was best experienced with the erotic scenes as they enhanced the plot and suggested audiences to enter it with little knowledge of the plot as possible while Roorda summarized the game as "a must-play visual novel for even the modest fan of this genre."

== Gameplay ==
You and Me and Her's story is conveyed through static images of characters, background art and predominantly from the point of view of the character Shinichi Susuki.

For the first several hours of gameplay in You and Me and Her: A Love Story, the game operates as a visual novel. These are narrative-focused games, where the player is able to impact the story's progression or world. The story and interactions in the games commonly presented through a text box and often employ forms of interaction which includes menu-choices. These menu options often employ additional forms of interaction including choices with set actions the player can perform or dialogue options that represent the player's character speech or thoughts. Visual novels have their stories progress when the player clicks, taps or presses a button to see the next part of story.

The aesthetics of visual novels are often conveyed through static images of characters, background art, soundtracks and sound effects for feedback. The game's point of view is from the protagonist Shinichi Suzuki. His face is rarely shown beyond a few scenes where his eyes are obscured. As Shinichi, the player can make choices that will determine his romantic partner by the end of the game.

Academics Mark Kretzschmar and Sara Raffel described the game as both an utsuge and eroge in their book The History and Allure of Interactive Visual Novels. Utusuge or a depressing game, was described by academic Ana Matlde as being "unconducive to players' feeling "properly" rewarded at the end of the game." They generally feature no happy endings and have few interactive choices. An eroge, or erotic game, feature sexual content in which range from being put loosely into their stories to visual novels that require sexual content to advance a purposely disturbing story.

== Plot ==
Shinichi Susuki, a self-described loser, meets a strange young woman named Aoi Mukou on the rooftop of a school. Aoi informs Shinichi that she can talk to God, who told her that she is a heroine in a romantic visual novel. Their meeting is interrupted by Miyuki Sone. Miyuki is Shinichi's beautiful childhood friend and currently the most popular girl in school. After Miyuki confesses her love to Shinichi at the batting cages they used to go to as kids, they share a kiss on the school rooftop, which Miyuki believes means that the two will share eternal love as a result of a school rumor. Shinichi promises her never to leave.

Eventually, Shinichi and Aoi have sex. Miyuki appears and breaks Aoi's head open with a baseball bat and kills Shinichi. A blood-covered Miyuki breaks the fourth wall, addresses the player for cheating on her and restarts the story with her own programmed event flags and consistently reminds the gamer that they are eternally in her narrative "route". Miyuki prevents the player from exiting the game, deletes the game's save files and image gallery information that involves Miyuki.

The game traps the player in a route where sex scenes are abundant and repetitive. Miyuki continues to have sex with Shinichi, using the character to communicate with the player, whom she wishes will declare their love for her during sex. The final decision between choosing Aoi or Miyuki will erase one of the characters from the game as the player watches them disappear on the screen.

== Production and release ==
You and Me and Her was developed by Nitroplus. The illustrations in the game were by Santa Tsuji while it was written by Shimokura Vio. Shimokura Vio was affiliated with Nitroplus who predominantly writes scenarios for adult games for personal computers (PCs). He was in charge of planning, scenario direction, and writing for You and Me and Her.

Nitroplus announced You and Me and Her in December 2012 for release in mid-2013 in Japan for Windows-based personal computers. It was sold on USB flash drives in Japan on June 28. Miyuki and Aoi would re-appear in other Nitro Plus titles, such as the fighting game Nitroplus Blasterz: Heroines Infinite Duel (2015).

As an eroge, the game is available in censored and uncensored versions. It was released to Western world in 2020. Joshua Roorda of Hardcore Gaming 101 said that game did not gain much widespread recognition in the United States on as it wasn't localized until 2020. While the game features voice acting, the localized version does not features an English-language dub.

== Reception ==
At the end of 2013, the Japanese website 4Gamer.net polled 151 Japanese game developers on the games of year, asking the creators to state a game they either admired or had shocked them the most. Yuji Shinoda, producer of Chain Chronicle for Sega and said the You and Me and Her had "truly struck a chord" with them, while game developer Takumi Nakazawa said he was deeply impressed by the games bold concepts and mechanics and motifs unique to the game as an adult-only release. He specifically recalled that it was exactly the story that could only work as an erotic game.

From later English-language reviews, Roorda complimented score, graphics, voice acting. While saying the game had "odd patches in the story" it still "hits hard" concluding that "There are few games that use meta elements so effectively, and after the finale, so heartbreakingly, as well as this." He concluded that the game was "a must-play visual novel for even the modest fan of this genre."

Academics Mark Kretzschmar and Sara Raffel wrote in their book The History and Allure of Interactive Visual Novels that You and Me and Her was best experienced without knowing the too much about the plot while saying it was a rarity in erotic games where the pornographic content adds to the story. They suggested audiences to experience the game with the pornography scenes enabled as doing it without blunted the impact of the story as much of the dialogue is altered so much in the censored version that some exchanges would not make sense.

Comparisons have been made with Dan Salvato's Doki Doki Literature Club! (2017), released four years after You and Me and Her as both games gradually reveal escape their reliance on well-worn narratives to shock an audience and reveal what Kretzschmar and Raffel described as both game's "true purpose". Roorda also compared the titles, as well as Undertale (2015) as games that break the fourth wall successfully to deepen the emotional impact of the story, but also added that You and Me and Her did this before the release of these popular games. A reviewer for Polygon complimented the game for its subversion of tropes, calling it "delightfully twisted."

== See also ==
- 2013 in video games
- List of eroge
