= Saya no Uta: The Song of Saya =

2003 video game

Saya no Uta
- Developer: Nitroplus
- Publishers: JP: Nitroplus; NA: JAST USA
- Director: Gen Urobuchi
- Producer: Digitarou
- Artist: Higashiguchi Chuuou
- Writer: Gen Urobuchi
- Composer: Zizz Studio
- Platforms: Microsoft Windows, Android, DVD-Player Game
- Release: Microsoft Windows: JP: December 26, 2003; WW: May 5, 2013; Blu-ray, DVD: JP: February 28, 2013; Android: JP: April 17, 2014
- Genres: Visual novel, eroge
- Mode: Single player

Saya no Uta (Japanese: 沙耶の唄; lit. 'The Song of Saya'), is a 2003 investigative horror eroge developed by Nitroplus, with lolicon and Lovecraftian horror elements. It was first released for Windows only in Japan in December 2003, and was later ported to other platforms. The story follows a young student, the sole survivor of a car accident that killed his family, who begins to suffer bizarre cognitive disorder-like symptoms that progress into constant horrific visual scenery, with the exception of one little girl. The original plot was written by Gen Urobuchi, who took inspiration from reading Lovecraft novels during a lonely time in his life.

In 2009, an English fan translation patch was released. Later, in 2013, American company JAST USA officially published an English localization using a revised version of the fan translation and also re-released hard copies on DVD-ROM in 2020 for outlets such as J-List with a more modern visual novel engine. A Chinese version was also released by Kagura Games, co-published with JAST, for the game service Steam, which uses a modern game engine. This version was heavily censored due to China's censorship regarding pornographic material and Steam's inconsistencies regarding lolicon material. The game was released on GOG under the moniker of "Directors Cut", although no changes were made to the originally intended writing or visuals.

Saya no Uta was released to critical acclaim. It was praised for its storytelling and its evocative and disturbing themes, and is regarded as an example of video games as an art form. Critics also noted the game's lolicon elements, commenting on Saya's appearance and character as "childish", and the plot as bearing resemblance to other lolicon works.

== Plot ==
Fuminori Sakisaka is a young medical student whose life changes when he and his parents are involved in a car accident. Fuminori is the sole survivor, but sustains a head injury that requires brain surgery, after which he develops a severe and bizarre case of agnosia that permanently affects the way he perceives his environment - the world appears as an abominable hellscape covered in gore, humans look like monstrous lumps of flesh, spoken words sound like grunts and screeches, normal meals taste and smell repulsive, and his sense of touch is impaired. Fuminori contemplates suicide until he meets Saya. Fuminori and Saya become lovers and move in together, eventually becoming deeply dependent on one another, with Saya in particular wanting Fuminori's help in finding her missing "father," Professor Masahiko Ogai. While living in Fuminori's home, the pair covers the walls and windows with random coats of paint of varying colors to attune to Fuminori's vision, while Saya acts as though she is Fuminori's wife, doing her best to cook and clean for him.

Fuminori grows increasingly cold and distant from his social circle, notably expressing disgust for his friend Yoh Tsukuba after she confesses her romantic feelings for him. Yoh's friend Omi Takahata enters Fuminori's home to confront him for cruelly rejecting Yoh, whereupon she notices something wrong with his house, which otherwise appears as unaesthetic flesh and entrails. Upon the realization, she is driven insane by a monster on the ceiling before being split in half by a single slash a split second later.

When Fuminori gets home, he catches Saya eating from what seems to be a fleshy plant growing on the house floor. Unassuming that it is something ominous and believing Saya to merely be shy about being seen eating to protect her feminine appeal, striking him as endearing, Fuminori asks for and eats a fruit from the plant, finding it to be flavorfully sweet. Koji Tonoh, Fuminori's long-time friend and Omi's boyfriend, is concerned by Fuminori's increasingly odd behavior and begins to investigate.

Saya visits Fuminori's neighbor and family man, Yosuke Suzumi, in a childish hope to help Fuminori and experimentally changes his neurological pathways to be the same as Fuminori's. Yosuke, instantly driven insane with the same agnosia, kills his wife and daughter in a fit of fear and self-preservation, with Saya showing some relief that she can indeed help Fuminori, albeit, in the crosshairs of an insane Yosuke, who restrains and rapes Saya before being caught and killed by Fuminori, setting her free. At this point, Saya reveals that she has the ability to revert and restore the comforting Fuminori's cognition and offers to do so:

- If Fuminori accepts, his perception of the world reverts to normal, but he is arrested for the murders of the Suzumi family and Omi. Despite the horrific nature of the crime, Fuminori escapes jail time, and is instead admitted to a mental hospital. Saya visits him one night, exchanging notes with him under the door of his room, as she does not want to expose him to her true form. She announces that she is leaving to continue her search for Professor Ogai. Fuminori swears to wait forever for her return.
- If Fuminori declines Saya's offer, he deduces that he has killed his neighbor and eaten his deceased friend "fruits", and that Saya is not human, but is unperturbed by these revelations and promises Saya that she is all he needs. Wanting to dispose of the increasingly suspicious Koji, Fuminori drives him to Ogai's mountain cabin and pushes him into a well. Saya assaults Yoh before mutating her into the same being as Saya, a process which puts Yoh through twenty hours of torturous pain. Fuminori and Saya turn Yoh into their sex slave, the former now once again able to see Yoh as her true, human self.

Fuminori's neurologist, Doctor Ryoko Tanbo, rescues Koji from the well, aware of Saya and already investigating Ogai. The two discover a secret chamber in the well and find Ogai's corpse, having committed suicide, along with his research on Saya and her species, revealing that Saya traveled to Earth from another world, and that Ogai performed various experiments on her, while also giving her the name "Saya." During this time, Ryoko repeatedly attempts to convince Koji to leave the case for his own safety, but he refuses, determined to see it through to the end, so she provides him with Ogai's revolver. Koji goes to Fuminori's home, where he discovers the flesh of Omi and the Suzumi family in the refrigerator. Now more than determined to put a stop to the madness, Koji makes a phone call:

- If Koji calls Fuminori, he threatens to expose Fuminori and Saya with the information he's obtained. Koji then goes to the abandoned asylum Saya and Fuminori are staying at with the goal of killing Fuminori, but instead finds Yoh, who begs him to kill her and end her suffering. Koji, not recognizing her but driven insane by her monstrous appearance, shoots her and beats her to death with a steel pipe before Fuminori arrives and attacks him. Koji manages to overpower Fuminori, but Saya intervenes and kills Koji. After feasting on Koji's body, Saya collapses and reveals that she is pregnant. Plant-like growths emerge from her back, and her body releases spores, calling it her "last gift" to Fuminori, who looks on in joy as the spores spread around the world, transforming all living beings into the same beings as Saya, and plunging society into chaos. Ryoko, hiding in Ogai's mountain cabin, finishes transcribing all of her research about Saya and her race before resigning herself to her fate of mutation.
- If Koji calls Ryoko, the two confront Fuminori at the asylum. Koji still kills Yoh during the fight, but before Saya can kill him, Ryoko arrives and gives Koji liquid nitrogen, which he proceeds to throw on Saya, freezing half of her body. Fuminori mortally wounds Ryoko with an axe, but Ryoko uses the last of her strength to shoot Saya, shattering the frozen part of her body. Upon seeing this, Fuminori commits suicide with the axe, after which the severely disfigured Saya crawls over to die alongside him. Koji survives, but is left severely traumatized, suffering from hallucinations and nightmares and perpetually wondering if other aberrations like Saya still exist in the darkest corners of the world. He keeps Ogai's revolver loaded with a single bullet behind the mirror in his bathroom medicine cabinet, planning to use it to commit suicide in case he ever one day decides that he can no longer live with the trauma or visions.

== Characters ==
Fuminori Sakisaka (匂坂 郁紀, Sakisaka Fuminori)
Voiced by: Hikaru Midorikawa (credited as Hikaru)
The main protagonist.
A medical school student, he is involved in a near-fatal traffic accident that kills his parents and leaves his perception of the world permanently altered. As he wades through a "world gone berserk" of flesh and blood, he seeks the affection of the only thing he sees as normal—a mysterious girl named Saya, with whom he falls madly in love. Over time, due to Saya's influence, Fuminori views normal people with apathetic disdain and becomes willing to kill others without remorse, with only Saya and, later, Yoh as exceptions. Unless he accepts Saya's offer of removing his agnosia, he gradually becomes a villain throughout the story: a ruthless killer, rapist, and cannibal, finding human flesh delicious through his twisted senses.
Saya (沙耶)
Voiced by: Naoko Takano (credited as Midori Kawamura)
The main heroine and title character.
A being from another dimension who materialized in this universe for the sole purpose of reproduction. She has no memories of her past and is guided only by her instincts. Due to Fuminori's condition, he perceives her as a beautiful young girl in a white dress. In actuality, she is some sort of amorphous, tentacled, fleshy abomination that emits a putrid stench and produces slime. She preys on creatures of all sizes, from cats to human beings, typically killing them by snapping their necks or disembowelment and then feasting on their internal organs. She is capable of projecting a strong acid, which she uses to digest her food before consuming it, and, in one case, to infiltrate a house by melting the glass of a window. Her true form is never fully revealed, since she immediately kills and consumes any third-party observers, as her visage is incomprehensible to humans, rendering them instantly insane.
Koji Tonoh (戸尾 耕司, Tonoo Kōji)
Voiced by: Yasunori Matsumoto (credited as Dajitoro Kataoka)
Fuminori's friend and protagonist of the investigative B-plot of the story. After Fuminori's accident, he has been trying to help Fuminori re-adjust to normal life. However, after Koji is almost killed by Fuminori, he learns that his former friend is beyond saving and attempts to kill him, with or without the help of Ryoko, depending on the player's choices.
Oumi Takahata (高畠 青海, Takahata Ōmi)
Voiced by: Hyo-sei (Credited as Erena Kaibara)
Kōji's girlfriend and Yoh's best friend. After Fuminori blatantly rejects Yoh, Omi goes to Fuminori's house to confront him, where she is killed by Saya. Her dismembered remains are stashed in the refrigerator as food for Saya and Fuminori.
Yoh Tsukuba (津久葉 瑤, Tsukuba Yō)
Voiced by: Mio Yasuda (credited as Izumi Yazawa)
A friend of Fuminori who has a crush on him. Since his accident, she has been worried and heartbroken at his sudden change of attitude toward the world. During the story, Yoh is kidnapped and assaulted by Saya before being painfully mutated into the same being she is, leaving Fuminori able to once again view Yoh as her true, human self. After being found by Koji, Yoh begs him to kill her and put her out of her misery. Koji's mind snaps from the sight of her monstrous form, and he beats her to death with a steel pipe in his horror and confusion.
Ryoko Tanbo (丹保 凉子, Tanbo Ryōko)
Voiced by: Mitsuki Saiga (credited as Makoto Sato)
The physician in charge of Fuminori's condition. She becomes suspicious that Fuminori has been hiding something during his routine checkups after he recovers from his injuries. She is revealed to be a stubborn and paranoid woman searching for the truth behind Ogai's heinous actions and becomes obsessed with hunting down Saya. Depending on the ending, Ryoko either lives and figures out the truth of Saya before mutating into the same species as Saya or kills Saya before succumbing to an injury given to her by Fuminori.
Yosuke Suzumi (鈴見 洋祐, Suzumi Yōsuke)
Voiced by: Masayuki Onizawa
One of Fuminori's neighbors. A kindly yet somewhat judgmental man who likes to paint. He lives a normal, carefree life with his wife and daughter until Saya curiously alters his perception of the world to be the same as Fuminori's in the hopes that someone else besides Fuminori will finally show her kindness. However, Yosuke is immediately driven insane and kills his family (whom he now perceives as hideous monsters) before raping Saya. Fuminori kills him in revenge.
Masahiko Ogai (奥涯 雅彦, Ōgai Masahiko)
Former professor at the university hospital who disappeared after an incident at the hospital. Both Saya (who calls him "Father") and Ryoko have tried to find him in the past, to no avail.

== Soundtrack ==
Made by ZIZZ STUDIO.

1. "Schizophrenia"
2. "Sabbath"
3. "Seek"
4. "Spooky Scape"
5. "Song of Saya I"
6. "Song of Saya II"
7. "Sin"
8. "Sunset"
9. "Shapeshift"
10. "Scare Shadow"
11. "Scream"
12. "Savage"
13. "Silent Sorrow"
14. "Song of Saya" (沙耶の唄, Saya no Uta), sung by Kanako Itō
15. "Shoes of Glass" (ガラスのくつ, Garasu no Kutsu), sung by Kanako Itō

== Adaptations ==
A three-issue comic book based on Saya no Uta, called Song of Saya, was produced by IDW Publishing. The monthly issues were released from February til April 2010. This westernized take was panned by critics for being unfaithful to the source material, for avoiding and sanitizing its heavy and unsettling plot points, and not showing understanding of the original work.

A feature film adaptation was in development by Sav! The World Productions, although no news has been shared since 2017.

== Reception ==
Saya no Uta has been well-received. Richard Eisenbeis of Kotaku observed the game as being "known as one of the most messed-up games ever released", but praises how the game makes the player sympathize with the villains—"But perhaps the most fascinating thing about The Song of Saya is that somehow, in the middle of all the horrors it presents, it manages to make the abominable, beautiful." Cody Perez of Siliconera described its art and story as "spectacularly horrifying" and overall called it one of the scariest games ever made. Matt Sainsbury of Digitally Downloaded awarded it a perfect score, calling it "a brutally dark and unrelenting vision carefully tailored to make you feel uneasy and uncomfortable" and an example of video games as art. Brittany Vincent of PCGamer observed it to have "one of the most terrifying narratives ever conceived in a visual novel", praising the emotional impact of the story and its themes. Grey Carter of The Escapist praised the writing as "truly Lovecraftian on both an aesthetic and thematic level".

Gen Urobuchi noted that the popularity of his later work Puella Magi Madoka Magica (2011) rekindled interest in Saya no Uta, so much so that Saya no Uta "made at least as much money as if it's a new game".

=== Lolicon ===
Saya no Uta is noted for its portrayal of Saya as childish in both her appearance and behaviour, and its storytelling noted for bearing similarities to other lolicon works. Matthew Sainsbury of Digitally Downloaded commented on the game as having "Lolita themes", while Grey Carter of The Escapist and Brittany Vincent of PC Gamer referred to Saya's appearance as "childlike".

Ana Matilde Sousa discussed the game's lolicon themes in her 2020 article, She's Not Your Waifu; She's an Eldritch Abomination. She argues that the game's approach to "antisocial queer theory", while elaborating on the concepts of moé and lolicon, and tropes within visual novels and anime:

Rather than 'merely' a human, Saya, seen from Fuminori's viewpoint, fits moe's character type par excellence: the loli, a shorter and cuter version of the traditional "beautiful girl" (bishōjo), for whom one cheers as if for a little sister or daughter", further elaborating on moé and lolicon "Namely, moe is often regarded as the evolution into a more palatable form of lolicon ('Lolita complex'), a genre of pornographic anime, manga, and videogames where underage-looking female characters engage in sexual acts. In this regard, one may point out that the popularization of the fandom slang waifu (a Japanese transliteration of the English word 'wife'), meaning a character to which one is attracted and considers to be one's significant other, coincided with the rise of moe in the late 1990s and early 2000s. The fact that the waifu, in the pop-cultural imagination, is typically a loli, imbues moe's 'pure' nonsexual affection with dubious undertones, in which sibling or filial love overlaps with marital eroticism and possessiveness[.]

Relating Saya to a literal "moéblob" and a "cthulhu little sister" to bridge the cuteness of Saya into being the horror itself.

Sousa further describes Saya as a "child-bride", elaborating on the relationship between Fuminori and Saya as "-when players first encounter Saya in Saya no Uta, it is as Fuminori's child-bride, who cooks, helps him redecorate the rooms, washes his back and, despite her childlike looks and behavior, fulfills her role as a lover with copious amounts of sex (to the point of nymphomania) while insisting on bearing Fuminori's children. Fuminori himself remarks: 'Ever since Saya moved in, it's been like having my own wife.'"

These perceptions of a childlike Saya are not an accidental portrayal, as in his dual compilation artbook Saya no Uta - Tenshi no Nichou Kenjuu -Angelos Armas- Official Works, which covers two of his previous Nitroplus eroge projects at the time, artist Chuo Higashiguchi (中央東口) admitted that the portrayal of Saya in the beta scripts ended up influencing his final image of how Saya should look, citing in a Q&A format (translated from Japanese):

Q - What is your image of "Saya no Uta," [and] how did you develop your image of the work when you were in charge of the original drawings?
A - I think Saya is defined by the balance between her childishness, her scary side, and other horror elements, as well as her vulnerability, including loneliness and love. During the work, I updated and solidified my image of her by reading the script that was given to me almost every day.

More pages of the artbook also show the scenes of Saya being much smaller in stature than the rest of the cast. One of the challenges Higashiguchi faced was to make Saya stand out from the rest of the otherwise ordinary looking cast, noting that development wasn't the most strict in how to portray her compared to a past project.
