= Nitroplus =

Japanese visual novel developer

- Native name: 株式会社ニトロプラス
- Romanized name: Kabushiki-gaisha Nitoropurasu
- Type: Kabushiki gaisha
- Industry: Computer games, mobile games
- Founded: June 2000; 26 years ago
- Headquarters: Taitō, Tokyo, Japan
- Key people: Takaki "Digitarou" Kosaka (president); Gen Urobuchi (vice president)
- Products: Visual novels
- Total equity: ¥10 million (US$121,418)(2012)
- Number of employees: 85 (as of September 2024)
- Parent: CyberAgent (72.5%)
- Website: nitroplus.co.jp

Nitroplus Co., Ltd., currently stylized as NITRO PLUS, formerly stylized as nitro+, and formerly known as "OKStyle", is a Japanese visual novel video game developer that has developed a number of visual novels, including eroge. They have also collaborated with developer Type-Moon to create the light novel series Fate/Zero. Their works usually have dark themes such as reanimation of the dead, rape, and murder. They also have a branch of the company called Nitro+chiral, which focuses on boys' love visual novels. Writers aligned with the company, such as Gen Urobuchi, have also contributed to various manga, anime, novels, and television works.

Super Sonico is the mascot of Nitroplus's annual music festival event "Nitro Super Sonic" since 2006. Nitroplus has held their music festival every year since 2000. Ouka Satsurikuin was Nitroplus's original mascot before Super Sonico.

In June 2024, Nitroplus announced that CyberAgent acquired 72.5% of the company for 16.7 billion yen, making it a subsidiary.

CyberAgent published a public relations interview about Nitroplus' decision to become a consolidated subsidiary, stating that Nitroplus approached CyberAgent for the merger after the company acquired Nelke Planning a year prior, which Takaki Kosaka, the representative director of Nitroplus, had a stake in as an independent director. The primary goal of the acquisition is for CyberAgent to take over the administrative and distribution aspects of the business so that Nitroplus can focus on content production, including reviving projects that were abandoned due to time constraints or lack of resource management. There are also plans for this partnership to help Nitroplus expand its influence overseas and strengthen the Touken Ranbu brand. In a follow up statement released on their company website, Nitroplus went on to clarify that the type of content produced by the company will not change, only the quality and quantity of the content.

== List of works ==
- Phantom of Inferno (February 25, 2000)
- Vampirdzhija Vjedogonia (January 26, 2001)
- Kikokugai: The Cyber Slayer (March 29, 2002)
- "Hello, world." (September 27, 2002)
- Zanma Taisei Demonbane (April 25, 2003)
- Saya no Uta (December 26, 2003)
- Phantom INTEGRATION (September 17, 2004)
- Angelos Armas -Tenshi no Nichou Kenju- (January 28, 2005)
- Jingai Makyō (June 24, 2005)
- Hanachirasu (September 30, 2005)
- Sabbat Nabe (December, 2005)
- Dra†KoI (February 3, 2006)
- Kishin Hishou Demonbane (May 26, 2006)
- Gekkō no Carnevale (January 26, 2007)
- Zoku Satsuriku no Django -Jigoku no Shoukinkubi- (July 27, 2007)
- Sumaga (September 26, 2008)
- Sumaga Special (June 26, 2009)
- Full Metal Daemon: Muramasa (October 30, 2009)
- Axanael (December 17, 2010)
- SoniComi (November 25, 2011)
- Phenomeno (June 16, 2012)
- Guilty Crown: Lost Christmas (July 27, 2012)
- You and Me and Her: A Love Story (June 28, 2013)
- Expelled from Paradise (November 15, 2014)
- Nitroplus Blasterz: Heroines Infinite Duel (April 30, 2015, developed by Examu)
- Tokyo Necro (January 29, 2016)
- Thunderbolt Fantasy (July 8, 2016)
- Minikui Mojika no Ko (July 27, 2018)
- Smile of the Arsnotoria (March 4, 2021)
- Rusty Rabbit (April 17, 2025)
- Dolls Nest (April 24, 2025)

They also released a fighting game Nitro+ Royale -Heroines Duel- (ニトロ+ロワイヤル -ヒロインズデュエル-) at the 2007 Comiket.

=== 5pb. x Nitroplus ===
- Chaos;Head (April 25, 2008)
- Chaos;Head Noah (February 26, 2009)
- Steins;Gate (October 15, 2009)
- Chaos;Head Love Chu Chu! (March 25, 2010)

=== DMM x Nitroplus ===
Nitroplus and DMM Corporation released a web browser game called Touken Ranbu in January 2015, which as of March 2015 is one of DMM's most popular games, second only to the largely popular Kantai Collection. In 2022, Nitroplus and DMM, in collaboration with Koei Tecmo Games and their in-house development teams, Omega Force and Ruby Party, developed and published a new entry in the series, Touken Ranbu Warriors for the Nintendo Switch and PC.

=== Nitro+Chiral branch works ===
Nitro+Chiral focused to boys-love games.

- Togainu no Chi (February 25, 2005/May 29, 2008)
- Lamento -Beyond the Void- (November 10, 2006)
- Sweet Pool (December 19, 2008)
- DRAMAtical Murder (March 23, 2012)
- DRAMAtical Murder re:connect (April 26, 2013)
- Slow Damage (February 25, 2021)

On January 25, 2008, they released a minigame disk titled CHiRALmori under this branch of which uses chibi versions of the characters from Togainu no Chi and Lamento.
