= Kikokugai: The Cyber Slayer =

Video game

鬼哭街 -The Cyber Slayer-
- Genre: Action, Dystopia, Drama, Cyberpunk
- Video game
- Developer: Nitroplus
- Publisher: Nitroplus
- Genre: Visual novel
- Platform: Windows PC
- Released: JP: March 29, 2002
- Video game

Kikokugai -Reichin Rinrinshan-
- Developer: Nitroplus
- Publisher: Nitroplus
- Genre: Visual novel
- Platform: Windows PC
- Released: JP: May 27, 2011

Kikokugai: The Cyber Slayer (鬼哭街 -The Cyber Slayer-) is a Japanese cyberpunk eroge visual novel by Nitroplus. It's Nitroplus' third game, and the script is written by Gen Urobuchi. The game is inspired by Chinese wuxia literature of Jin Yong and Gu Long, in particular Sentimental Swordsman, Ruthless Sword (多情劍客無情劍).

The game was remade in 2011 as Kikokugai -Reichin Rinrinshan- with enhanced graphics, a new theme song, and character voices added, and without sex scenes.

== Plot ==
Kikokugai takes place in Shanghai, in a dystopian future of organized crime and cyborg assassins.
