= Gekkō no Carnevale =

2007 video game

- Cover art from the Gekkō no Carnevale visual novel

月光のカルネヴァーレ (Gekkō no Karunevāre)
- Video game
- Developer: Nitroplus
- Publisher: Nitroplus
- Genre: Eroge, Visual novel, Gothic
- Platform: Windows
- Released: January 26, 2007
- Manga
- Written by: J Sairō
- Illustrated by: Oosaki Shinya
- Published by: Akita Shoten
- Magazine: Champion Red
- Original run: April 2007 – February 2008
- Volumes: 2
- Light novel

Gekkō no Carnevale ~Silver Caryatid~ (月光のカルネヴァーレ～白銀のカリアティード～)
- Written by: J Sairō
- Illustrated by: Oosaki Shinya
- Published by: Shogakukan
- Imprint: Gagaga Bunko
- Original run: May 24, 2007 – April 23, 2008
- Volumes: 3

Gekkō no Carnevale (月光のカルネヴァーレ, Gekkō no Karunevāre; "Carnival of Moonlight") is a Japanese eroge visual novel developed by Nitroplus that was released on January 26, 2007. Gekkō no Carnevale has been adapted into a manga, a light novel, and a drama CD. It is a story set in a Gothic world.

== Plot and Setting ==
The story takes place in a city resembling Italy, known as Belmonte, with the technology levels resembling levels in the late 19th century. In this city there are human-sized mechanical dolls known as "Automata" who serve the people of the city. The protagonist, Romeo, is a taxi driver who was originally involved in an organization known as the "Orma Rossa"(Red Mark). He finds an automata in the shape of a young woman, who appears to have amnesia. He names her Anna and they start living together. However, sometime later, the Orma Rossa begin to catch up to Romeo, and an organization composed of automata also appears; thus, Romeo must fight to protect his current life.

== Voice Actors ==
- Romeo - Tomokazu Sugita
- Anna - Miyabi Himeno
- Lunaria - Kaori Mizuhashi
- Noel - Mia Naruse
- Germano - Kamezō Yushiyanagi
- Rebecca - Kaori Okuda
- Valentino - Dai Matsuri
- Guglielmo - Kazuya Ichijo
- Silvio - Kurōzaemon Matsugami
- Carmelo - Makoto Yasumura
- Marcantonio - Dai Sasaki
- Iris - Runa Sakaki
- Perla - Kisato Shinuchi
- Korunarina - Erena Kaibara
- Pius - Kōtei
- Alternaria - Mia Kureno
- Davide - Kyōnosuke Hiruma
- Paolo - Itsuki Akiyama
- Fabio - Ryou Majima
- Bice - Megumi Yuki

== Reception ==
In the first half of the year of 2007, Gekkō no Carnevale was able to net enough sales to place it as the 50th highest selling visual novel on Getchu.com.
