= Demonbane =

Japanese visual novel series

デモンベイン (Demonbein)
- Genre: Mecha, Action, Romance
- Video game

Deus Machina Demonbane
- Developer: Nitroplus
- Publisher: Nitroplus (PC, PS2); Kadokawa Shoten (PS2)
- Genre: Eroge, visual novel
- Platform: Windows, PlayStation 2
- Released: Windows: JP: April 25, 2003; NA: May 13, 2011; PlayStation 2: JP: July 1, 2004
- Novel series

Zanma Taisei Demonbane
- Written by: Jin Haganeya
- Published by: Kadokawa Shoten
- Imprint: Kadokawa Sneaker Bunko
- Original run: September 2003 – January 2007
- Volumes: 6
- Original video animation

Kishin Houkou Demonbane
- Directed by: Shintaro Inokawa
- Written by: Katsuhiko Takayama
- Music by: ZIZZ STUDIO
- Studio: View Works
- Released: July 1, 2004
- Runtime: 24 minutes
- Manga

Kishin Houkou Demonbane
- Written by: Nitroplus; Takashi Tanegashima
- Illustrated by: Yūki Tanaka
- Published by: Kadokawa Shoten
- Magazine: Comptiq
- Original run: 2004 – 2006
- Volumes: 4
- Anime television series

Kishin Houkou Demonbane
- Directed by: Hidetoshi Yoshida
- Written by: Yōsuke Kuroda
- Music by: ZIZZ STUDIO
- Studio: View Works
- Original network: WOWOW
- Original run: May 18, 2006 – August 17, 2006
- Episodes: 12
- Video game

Kishin Hishou Demonbane
- Developer: Nitroplus
- Publisher: Nitroplus
- Genre: Action, visual novel
- Platform: Windows
- Released: JP: May 26, 2006

Demonbane (デモンベイン, Demonbein) is a Japanese visual novel series by Nitroplus with mecha and Cthulhu Mythos elements. Beginning as an eroge visual novel for the PC, it was ported into a PlayStation 2 non-eroge remake, and spawned a sequel visual novel, a prequel novel, an anime television adaptation and a conversion to manga. An English version of the original Demonbane PC game was released by JAST USA. The anime was previously streamed with English subtitles by Crunchyroll.

== List of games ==
- Zanma Taisei Demonbane (斬魔大聖デモンベイン, Zanma Taisei Demonbein)

Also known as Deus Machina Demonbane. The first of the series published on April 25, 2003, the title loosely translates to "Demon-Slaying Grand Saint Demonbane".

- Kishin Houkou Demonbane (機神咆吼デモンベイン, Kishin Hōkō Demonbein)

The PlayStation 2 port of the original, published on July 1, 2004. The title loosely translates to "Roar of the Machine God Demonbane". Both the anime and the manga adaptations were based on this title, as well as using it in their adaptations. The game was also bundled with a one-episode OVA.

- Kishin Hishou Demonbane (機神飛翔デモンベイン, Kishin Hishō Demonbein)

A direct sequel to Zanma Taisei Demonbane, the title loosely translates to "Flight of the Machine God Demonbane". Unlike the original, players can control the actions of the titular machine Demonbane in battle.

- Azathoth-D (字祷子D-妖都最速伝説, Azatōsu-Dī: Yōto Saisoku Densetsu)

A spin-off racing game released at the 70th Comiket, the title is a parody on the popular racing manga Initial D.

- Super Robot Wars UX

Released for the Nintendo 3DS, the anime version of Demonbane appears alongside many mecha from other franchises in this crossover title.

== Story ==
Kurou Daijuuji is a poor detective living in Arkham City. One day, he receives a request from Ruri Hadou of Hadou Financial Group to search for a magic book. While he initially refuses, Ruri offers him a large sum of money upon completion of her request, which leads Kurou to accept. As Kurou searches for the book, he unexpectedly runs into Al, a pretty girl that is actually a powerful grimoire. They forge a contract with each other, bestowing Kurou with powerful magic. Soon afterwards, Al also activates Demonbane, a deus machina owned by the Hadou Financial Group, to combat the mechanical menace from the Black Lodge, beginning the war between the Hadou Financial Group and the Black Lodge.

=== Setting ===
Demonbane takes place primarily in a region resembling the Lovecraft Country common to several of the Mythos stories, including Herbert West-Reanimator and The Shadow Over Innsmouth. The majority of the plot is confined to Arkham City, the home and headquarters of the Hadou Financial Group as well as the location of the Miskatonic University. Arkham City is also the territory of a criminal organization known as the Black Lodge, which has access to an array of giant mecha as well as a number of powerful sorcerers that make it difficult for law enforcement to effectively combat. A separate portion of the story is set in the coastal town of Innsmouth and one of the climactic battles takes place over the sunken city of R'lyeh. The town of Dunwich is also referenced.

=== Characters ===
The player assumes the role of Kurou Daijūji, a private investigator that specializes in strange and unusual cases. Kurou used to attend the Miskatonic University, majoring in Archaeology while secretly studying sorcery, but dropped out after an unspecified incident that has caused him to become averse to dealing with occult matters. He has difficulty finding any work and, by the time the events of the story occur, can no longer afford to pay his utility bills. Kurou does have a good heart and tries to help others, usually explaining that he would be bothered by lingering regrets if anything bad happened that could have been prevented by his intervention.

Kurou often approaches Sister Leica, a nun who runs a church and orphanage in Arkham City, for food. She is very kindhearted and rarely refuses to help Kurou in his times of need but cares deeply about his well-being, constantly pressuring him to go back to his studies, graduate, and find a real job. She takes care of three orphans named George, Colin, and Alison. Ruri Hadou, another of Demonbane's heroines, is Kurou's employer and shoulders a heavy burden as the leader of the Hadou Financial Group following the death of her grandfather. Although outwardly resentful of Kurou for "stealing" her grandfather's legacy, she is also frustrated by her inability to influence the ongoing conflict personally and comes to depend on Kurou's strength.

Demonbane's final main character is Al-Azif, the physical embodiment of the legendary Necronomicon. Over the millennia, she has fought countless battles alongside countless masters. When one died she would simply discard them and find another, and inwardly feels deep regret for the way she treated them as mere tools even as they did the same to her. She is very short-tempered and arrogant but holds absolute confidence in her ability to confront and destroy evil.

=== Plot ===
In the space above Earth, the Deus Machina Aeon clashes with another unknown machine but due to its lack of a "master", it is defeated and crashes on the surface of the planet. Meanwhile, a starving Kurou Daijūji attempts to acquire food from a local church run by Sister Leica, a nun that he has known since he first moved to the city several years prior to the events of the story. The next day, Kurou is approached by Ruri Hadou, the current head of the Hadou Financial Group and her butler, Winfield. Ruri offers Kurou a job, citing his familiarity with the occult through his studies at the Miskatonic University: to procure a grimoire. Unable to refuse the generous pay she is offering, Kurou agrees and begins searching immediately.

The search for an authentic grimoire is fruitless, until Kurou happens upon a previously unknown bookstore with several powerful books. Unfortunately he is turned away by the store's owner, Nya, who cryptically states that a far more powerful grimoire is meant for him. This prediction is later proven true when a mysterious girl falls out of the sky onto him, subsequently introduced as Al-Azif, the physical manifestation of the Necronomicon, one of the most powerful grimoires in existence. Kurou is then attacked by her pursuers, the Black Lodge, under the command of the mad scientist Doctor West and forced by circumstances to enter into a contract with the grimoire. Doctor West retreats, only to return in one of his giant Destroyer Robots. Kurou escapes with the aid of Metatron, a masked hero that wages a one-man war against the Black Lodge, and stumbles upon an underground hangar containing an imitation Deus Machina, Demonbane. After commandeering the mech amidst the protests of its owner, Ruri, Kurou and Al-Azif (or Al, for short) are able to defeat the Destroyer Robot.

Although initially incensed at the prospect of someone outside the Hadou family piloting Demonbane, Ruri agrees to employ Kurou as the Deus Machina's pilot. Al wants to begin instructing him in the use of sorcery immediately, but before he has a chance to prepare, Kurou is attacked by the leader of the Black Lodge, Master Therion. Kurou is immediately overpowered but his use of Demonbane forces Therion to reveal his own grimoire: the Pnakotic Manuscripts, also known as Etheldreda. Therion spares Kurou's life, claiming that Kurou is the only individual who can alleviate his boredom, and vanishes. Kurou then begins training in sorcery while simultaneously searching for and recapturing pages that Al has lost. These pages eventually take on a life of their own and threaten the population, forcing him to subdue them physically before Al can reconstitute herself. Kurou's interference in the Black Lodge's operations causes Master Therion to send two of his elite Anticross sorcerers, Titus and Tiberius, to attack the Hadou headquarters directly. Doctor West also repeatedly attempts to make up for his failure to capture the Necronomicon, assisted by a self-aware gynoid of his own creation named Elsa. In one incident, West and Elsa are able to steal the pages relating to the Scimitar of Barzai and use them to create a copy of Demonbane that is subsequently defeated.

The story then moves to the coastal town of Innsmouth where Ruri has brought Kurou, Al, the Demonbane support team, and Leica on a beach holiday. Sensing the presence of evil on an island off the coast, Kurou and Al begin investigating, accompanied by the rest of the group. On the way they are attacked by Deep Ones and separated but each of the group is able to make their way to the island individually where they discover the inhabitants of Innsmouth, all Deep Ones themselves, performing a ritual to revive their god, Dagon. Overseeing them is another of the Anticross, Vespasianus, along with another powerful grimoire, the R'lyeh Text. The ritual fails but Dagon is revived in an incomplete, bestial state. The monster is only defeated when Demonbane channels the raw power of the Great Old One Cthugha, which nearly kills Kurou. Kurou is later able to acquire Al's pages concerning another Great Old One, Ithaqua, and obtains a pair of handguns that serve as conduits for their power from a mysterious individual known to the Black Lodge as the Tyrant.

In the meantime, it is revealed that both the Necronomicon and the Tyrant are essential to a major Black Lodge undertaking, the C Project, but Master Therion appears unconcerned by the fact that his underlings have had no success in capturing either of them. He placates the Anticross by explaining that he can use the Pnakotic Manuscripts in place of the Necronomicon and himself in place of the Tyrant but they remain unconvinced and plot rebellion behind his back. Finally, when the stars are right, the Black Lodge begins a ritual that raises their secret headquarters, the Illusionary Heart Mother, into the sky. They then reveal their full plan, using the R'lyeh Text to summon and bind another of the Great Old Ones: Cthulhu. Using an army of Destroyer Robots and the wave of insanity that accompanies the summoning, the Black Lodge lays waste to Arkham City. The Anticross betray Master Therion at the climax of the battle, seemingly destroying him along with Etheldreda, while Doctor West defects, disgusted by the perceived misuse of his technology. While Demonbane is able to drive off the Destroyer Robots, the Illusionary Heart Mother is able to teleport away, the Anticross having gained control over Cthulhu through a series of emergency measures.

The Hadou Group is able to locate the missing fortress at 47°9′S 126°43′W and mobilises a multinational taskforce through its connections to begin an attack. While they engage Cthulhu's forces in the sea, Demonbane is able to penetrate the fortress' defences and defeat the remaining Anticross. Master Therion then reveals himself, reborn as a result of his unique parentage; his father is the Outer God Yog-Sothoth and the true purpose of the C Project was to sacrifice Cthulhu as the catalyst of a ritual to summon it. Yog-Sothoth, the Gate and the Key, would then act as a portal through which the Outer Gods could then invade the physical universe. Therion challenges Kurou to follow him through the gate and, after saying his goodbyes, Kurou accepts. Demonbane then battles Therion's Deus Machina, Liber Legis, throughout time and space leading to a clash between the most powerful weapon in each mech's possession: the Shining Trapezohedron. Liber Legis is defeated but Al is finally able to access the totality of her sealed knowledge and discovers the identity of the one who orchestrated all of the story's events: Nya, also known as the Outer God Nyarlathotep. Kurou and Al battle the god and defeat it, preventing the destruction of reality. Nyarlathotep acknowledges its defeat but points out that it can always return with another scheme, leaving Demonbane becalmed in time and space.

== Adaptations ==
=== Kishin Houkou Demonbane OVA ===
A one episode OVA bundled with the PS2 game Kishin Houkou Demonbane, a port of the original Deus Machina Demonbane (Zanma Taisei Demonbane), it was released on July 1, 2004.

==== Plot ====
Lily Bridge, a young journalist, arrives at Arkham City, hoping to find a big scoop. However, with all the strange things occurring around the city, only the exceptional findings are news-worthy, such as the mysterious mecha known as Demonbane. However, upon finding a small piece of machinery that seemed to be connected with the Hadou Combine, Lily is determined to find the truth. Little does she know, she enters into a dark world, involving herself with Demonbane and the powerful forces that control the city.

=== Kishin Houkou Demonbane TV ===
Kishin Houkou Demonbane is a TV series animated adaptation of the first Demonbane game, which began airing on May 18, 2006, and ended on August 17, 2006. The characters showcased in the TV series differ slightly from those in the game. For example; Metatron has a few seconds of screentime in the first few episodes then never shows up again, Sandalphon is never seen, Ryuuga is seen only in the ending sequence, and Dagon's design was changed entirely.

==== Plot ====
Kuro Daijuuji is a poor detective living in Arkham City. One day, he is asked by Ruri Hado of Hado Financial Group, to search for a magic grimoire. As Kuro searches for the book, he unexpectedly runs into Al Azif, a pretty girl who turns out to be the grimoire Kuro is searching for. While being chased by the Black Lodge, Al forges a contract with Kuro, bestowing him with powerful magic. Soon afterwards, Al also activates Demonbane, a Deus Machina owned by the Hado Financial Group, to combat the mechanical menace from the Black Lodge. With this, the war between the Hado Financial Group and the Black Lodge begins ...

==== Ending ====
The ending of the Demonbane anime series is original, made up for the TV series. It at first takes after Al's good ending, but instead of having her drift through space for aeons, it has the Elder Gods Kurou and Al-Azif (from Al's true ending) rescue her and bring her right back to Arkham, and Kurou's waiting arms.

==== Episodes ====
| No. | Title | Original release date |
|---|---|---|
| 1 | "I AM PROVIDENCE" | May 18, 2006 |
Daijūji Kurou is a broke detective who is unexpectedly hired by a woman from the city's most respected leaders. He's asked to search for a powerful grimoire and is paid handsomely for taking the case. In searching for the magical item(a book) he stumbles into a strange bookstore, where the mysterious proprietor predicts that his future will change dramatically. He stumbles out onto the street where a lovely young girl falls from the sky and directly into his lap. He has no time to react as she is being chased by villains known as the Black Lodge, intent on killing and claiming her true form. Kurou witnesses her use magic and save his life from the bullets fired towards his car. When a crazy-psychotic doctor begins firing with heavy weaponry, Kurou is able to speed away in his car, taking the strange girl with him. The doctor discovers them just as the young girl decides to turn the tables.
| 2 | "EVIL SHINE" | May 25, 2006 |
| 3 | "REANINATOR" | June 15, 2006 |
| 4 | "THE INVADERS" | June 22, 2006 |
| 5 | "THE SHADOW OVER INNSMOUTH" | June 29, 2006 |
| 6 | "QUO VADIS" | July 6, 2006 |
| 7 | "BIG "C"" | July 13, 2006 |
| 8 | "SHADOW IN THE DARK" | July 20, 2006 |
| 9 | "THE HUNT" | July 27, 2006 |
| 10 | "METALLIC WARCRY" | August 3, 2006 |
| 11 | "THE RETURN OF THE SORCERER" | August 10, 2006 |
| 12 | "STRANGE EONS" | August 17, 2006 |

==== Theme Songs ====
Opening theme
"Man God Machine" by Yuuichi Ikuzawa
Ending theme
"Modern Rose" by Kanako Ito

== Novels ==
There are currently six novel adaptations. While the first three retell events originally covered in Zanma Taisei/Kishin Houkou, the other novels feature new story content.

=== Zanma Taisei's story retold ===
斬魔大聖デモンベイン 無垢なる刃 (Deus Machina Demonbane Muku naru Yaiba - "The Innocent Blade")

斬魔大聖デモンベイン 魔を断つ剣 (Deus Machina Demonbane Ma o Tatsu Tsurugi - "The Demon-slaying Sword")

斬魔大聖デモンベイン 明日への翼 (Deus Machina Demonbane Asu e no Tsubasa - "The Wing towards Tomorrow")

=== New stories ===
斬魔大聖デモンベイン 機神胎動 (Deus Machina Demonbane Kishin Taidō - "The Embryonic Movements of Machine God"): Direct prequel to Zanma Taisei/Kishin Houkou.

斬魔大聖デモンベイン 軍神強襲 (Deus Machina Demonbane Gunshin Kyōshū - "The Assault of the War God"): Sequel to Kishin Taidou, but its relationship to the games is not apparent.

斬魔大聖デモンベイン ド・マリニーの時計 (Deus Machina Demonbane Do Marinī no Tokei - "De Marigny's Clock")
