= Jingai Makyō =

2005 video game

- Developer(s): Nitroplus
- Publisher(s): Nitroplus
- Platform(s): Windows
- Release: June 24, 2005
- Genre(s): Visual novel, Romance
- Mode(s): Single player

Jingai Makyō (塵骸魔京) is a Japanese adult visual novel game developed by Nitroplus that was released on June 24, 2005.

== Plot ==
Demonic creatures exist and manipulate the world behind the scenes (called Narazaru). Some are good and just want to live in the world, while others have grander goals of opening the Demon Gate and make the earth their prize.

The main character is Kumon Katsuki, a Japanese college student, who lost his parents in an accident and since then has been cared for by his landlady. He has a strange set of eyes, with one blue eye and one red eye. His little sister Kumon Megumi, goes to boarding school in England, but still comes back to visit him from time to time. His best friend Makimoto Misae has always been supportive of the main character and has stuck by him through thick and thin. Still the main character is an unusual person for he has strange dreams, seeing visions of a beautiful black haired maiden with a black umbrella, who speaks to him in his dreams. This begins to become more prevalent when he starts seeing her in the waking world, and does not understand what is happening to him. This leads him on a path to discovering the existence of the Narazaru and playing a vital role that will either save the world or lead it on the path of destruction.

== Characters ==
Kumon Katsuki (The Hero): The main character of the game appears to be a college student with a tragic past, but, depending on his actions, evolves to play a major role in the fate of the world. In all paths through the game, the Hero eventually gets infused with Demon Blood and gains the power to transform into a Demon/Human hybrid form, giving him superhuman strength, speed and endurance, as well as regenerative abilities, razor sharp talons and the ability to shoot blasts of energy from his hands. He can choose to follow three different paths through the game, depending on which heroine he chooses to trust.

Ignis (Protector of Humanity): Ignis is a Demon Hunter with fiery red hair and an attractive figure. She's an expert martial artist and has superb skills with a Katana and numerous other weapons that she uses in her Demon Hunting. Despite not having the superhuman abilities of the Narazaru, she's more than a match in battle for them, using her superb fighting skills to overcome the most dangerous of adversaries. Despite her tough exterior, she's a friendly woman who quickly becomes attracted to the main Hero of the game. However, her flaw is that she's overzealous in her work, and hence has earned enemies even among the Good-aligned demons.

Kaze no Ushiro wo Ayumumono (Wolf-Demon): Kazeko is a wolf demon, drawn to the city for some undetermined reason. She's a cute demon girl who looks to be a child, but is probably much older. She possesses a number of demon powers, including those possessed by the Hero, as well as having the ability to transform herself into a wolf. At first, she is an enemy of Ignis, attacking her during their first meeting in the city, likely because she recognizes her as a Demon Hunter and holds a grudge against Ignis. Depending on the Hero's actions, he will either chose Kazeko or Ignis as his mentor. In either case, it is Kazeko who gives the Hero his newfound powers when her blood mingles with his. Kazeko is as playful and immature as a child, but has a good heart and is instrumental in helping the hero on every route.

== Reception ==
Jingai Makyō placed 18th in Getchu.com's game sales ranking for the first half of 2005 and 38th for the entire year of 2005.

== Adaptations ==
A novel based on the game was published on April 30, 2006, titled Jingai Makyō: Riders of Darkness (塵骸魔京～ライダーズ・オブ・ダークネス～). It was written by Norimitsu Kaihō, and illustrated by Namaniku ATK.
