= List of Chaos;Child episodes =

Chaos;Child DVD volume 1 cover, featuring Serika Onoe

Chaos;Child (カオスチャイルド, Kaosu Chairudo) is an anime adaptation of 5pb.'s video game of the same name. The series was directed by Masato Jinbo at Silver Link, and aired in Japan from January to March 2017; it was followed by the theatrical film Chaos;Child: Silent Sky in June 2017, which adapts the game's ending.

== Episode list ==
No.	Official English title (Note: All English titles are taken from Crunchyroll & Funimation.) Original Japanese title	Original release date
0	"Chaos;Head"	January 11, 2017
A recap of the events in Chaos;Head.
1	"Digital Native"; Transliteration: "Jōhō tsuwamono wa jiken o ou" (Japanese: 情報強者は事件を追う)	January 11, 2017
Six years after a massive earthquake devastated Shibuya, the city has been rebuilt and the survivors have continued with their lives. One of these survivors, Takuru Miyashiro, is a member of his school's newspaper club and is investigating a string of mysterious deaths, causing his foster sister Nono Kurusu to worry about him. Takuru then realizes the dates of the deaths line up exactly with the New Generation Madness murders that also occurred six years ago, and deduces that next death will occur today. He heads for a potential crime scene at a love hotel with his friend and fellow club member Serika Onoe, where they discover a girl waking up next to the bodies of two murdered men. The girl, Hinae Arimura, is taken in for questioning. Meanwhile, Takuru and Serika review the footage they took of the crime scene and notice the presence of a Sumo Sticker, an odd piece of graffiti that had mysteriously appeared in the city eight years ago. After learning that Hinae is a student at his school, Takuru heads to the Student Council room to investigate when he discovers that Hinae is in fact the president of the literature club. After Hinae confirms that Takuru was the one that found her at the hotel, she warns him that he will be killed.
2	"Sumo Sticker"; Transliteration: "Jiken ga karera o usobuku" (Japanese: 事件が彼らを嘯く)	January 18, 2017
Takuru and Serika continue to investigate the Sumo stickers as well as Hinae. First, they upload a video detailing their theories about the Sumo stickers and their relation to the current string of serial murders and the New Generation Madness killings. They then follow Hinae and eavesdrop on a conversation between her and a detective, where they learn that Hinae was cooperating with the murder victim on some sort of investigation. Takuru also has Shinji install a camera near a wall with multiple Sumo stickers. Meanwhile, a popular online newscaster named Kei popularizes Takuru's video about the Sumo stickers. Kei is actually a scientist named Mio Kunosato, who explains to her partner Shinjou that she is trying to spur the internet to investigate the Sumo stickers. Sure enough, Takuru receives a lead that the creator of the Sumo stickers is currently in a coma at the Tokyo General Hospital. Meanwhile, Nono continues to worry about Takuru's investigation, and goes to take down the camera Shinji set up. However, as she does so, she is attacked and stabbed from behind.
3	"School Festival"; Transliteration: "Karera no matsuri no ohanashi no ī bun" (Japanese: 彼らの祭りのお話の言い分)	January 25, 2017
Nono is injured by the stabbing, but survives the attack, much to Takuru's relief. It is revealed that Takuru's parents were murdered during the Shibuya earthquake. Since Nono must stay home to recover, the Newspaper Club takes up her duties in helping organize the School Festival. However, during the festival, a local up-and-coming reporter invited for an interview named Watabe vomits out Sumo Stickers before collapsing dead on the stage. Mio and Shindou arrive to interview Takuru, Serika, Hinae, and Shinji about Watabe's death. Since the Newspaper Club all have alibis, they are not considered suspects in Watabe's death. After a brief conversation with each other, Mio and Shindou take their leave, but not before Mio asks whether anybody saw a white light during the Shibuya earthquake. Takuru replies that he had, and Mio leaves without explaining anything further. Serika then mentions that she managed to overhear what Mio and Shindou were talking about, recounting how they mentioned that all of the victims of the serial murders were rumored to possess psychic powers: the first claimed he could see into the future, the second's music sent people into a trance, the third seemed to be able to read his customers' minds, and Watabe himself always knew where a big story was about to occur. Mio and Shindou oversee Watabe's autopsy and are shocked to discover Watabe had swallowed countless Sumo Stickers until he suffocated himself. Intrigued by the mention of psychic powers, Takuru decides to continue his investigation despite Nono's pleas for him to stop.
4	"Her Words"; Transliteration: "Ohanashi no uragawa ga mōsō o hajimeru" (Japanese: お話の裏側が妄想を始める)	February 1, 2017
Takuru, Serika, and Shinji sneak into the Tokyo General Hospital to try and find the creator of the Sumo Stickers. However, they get lost in the hospital and find themselves in a secret facility underneath the building. During this time, Takuru begins to suffer flashbacks of a girl being experimented on, as well as experiencing extreme hallucinations. The group then encounters Mio, who had also infiltrated the hospital to find answers. She leads them to a computer where she begins pulling data, explaining that the hospital was used as a front to conceal human experimentation on the brain. She reveals that the hospital was investigating the effects of the "eleventh Rorschach test" on certain individuals. The eleventh Rorschach test is revealed to be the Sumo Sticker, and Takuru has an adverse reaction upon seeing it. Takuru and Serika also recognize the original test subject, Senri Minamisawa, who was the girl they remember seeing being experimented on. Mio continues that the experiments had been halted after the Shibuya Earthquake occurred and Senri went missing. They also recognize another girl, Uki Yamazoe, who was one of the few people to survive the experiments with her sanity intact. Mio kidnaps Uki and the group makes their escape.
5	"Gigalomaniacs"; Transliteration: "Mōsō no jūnin ga sawagi semaru" (Japanese: 妄想の住人がさわぎ迫る)	February 8, 2017
At Mio's office, Mio explains to Takuru that he is a "Gigalomaniac", a person who can draw upon the Dirac sea to "turn delusions into reality". Hinae demonstrates this by showing him that she has the power to detect whether a person is lying or not, and Mio theorizes that Takuru has some sort of psychokinesis due to his apparent ability to open doors he normally shouldn't be able to. Meanwhile, Uki is adamant about returning to the hospital to care for the patients there. Seeing that she can't get any useful information out of her, Mio arranges for Uki to be sent to a special care facility. Serika goes to check on Nono, and then suggests to Takuru that he go visit her, too. On the way to the clinic, Takuru begins to become distressed at seeing Sumo Stickers and runs into Hinae. They both decide to head for the clinic together when they are attacked by another Gigalomaniac with pyrokinesis. Takuru and Hinae are barely able to defend themselves before the attacker leaves. Upon reaching the clinic, Nono reveals that she was childhood friends with Senri and was aware of the human experiments she was subjected to. She then asks Takuru and Hinae to tell her everything. Back at the hospital, Shindou investigates the basement and finds it completely abandoned except for Uki, who is distressed that the patients are gone.
6	"Their Resistance"; Transliteration: "Okashita kako ni maniau tame ni" (Japanese: 侵した過去に間に合うために)	February 15, 2017
Uki is sent to the Aoba Dorm to live with Nono. Mio is frustrated that she cannot discern what exactly Uki's power is. Takuru and the Newspaper Club continue to investigate the killings with the new information they have gathered, and Takuru speculates that the pyrokinetic Gigalomaniac that attacked him and Hinae was in fact Senri. In addition, since there were a number of serial arsons that took place at the same time as the killings, Takuru reluctantly suspects that Senri may in fact be the killer as well. The group decides to stay together at a cafe on October 23, the day another New Generation Murder is supposed to take place. There, Takuru sees a Sumo Sticker and has another delusion where he is attacked by the pyrokinetic. The group returns to the Aoba Dorm where Hinae resolves to hunt down the pyrokinetic herself. The pyrokinetic is sighted trying to enter the Aoba Dorm, but disappears at midnight when it becomes October 24.
7	"Untitled"	February 22, 2017
Shinjou investigates the scene of another death, and it is revealed that the victim is the pyrokinetic. After being informed of the pyrokinetic's death, Takuru and his friends believe that the killings are over and begin to relax. However, information about the pyrokinetic's possible identity as Senri and the fact she used to be friends with Nono leaks on the internet, causing a massive media storm. Takuru goes to comfort Nono, when he receives a call from Shinjou warning him that the pyrokinetic was not Senri as everybody had initially believed, but was another person named Haida Riko. She had actually died on October 23, and the Riko seen trying to enter the Aboa Dorm was most likely a delusion created by the real killer. Takuru then receives a call from Shinji, who reveals that he is torturing Takuru and Nono's adopted younger sister Yui. Takuru and Nono arrive to confront Shinji to find that he has murdered and dismembered Yui, stashing her body parts inside gift boxes and arranged to look like a human body shape assembled. Shinji claims that all the killings are revenge against Takuru for letting Senri die in the hospital. Nono then realizes somebody else must be controlling Shinji since there was no way he and Senri could have met. Shinji collapses from the strain of the mind control on him, and Takuru and Nono are left to grieve over Yui's death.
8	"Heads or Tails"; Transliteration: "Sakusō suru hikari to kage ni madou omoi wa" (Japanese: 錯綜する光と影に惑う思いは)	March 1, 2017
After attending Yui's funeral, Nono admits to Takuru that she is not the real Nono Kurusu, but in fact Senri. As a child, she did indeed befriend the real Nono, but she was killed in the earthquake. It was then that Senri gained the ability to change her appearance at will, and took on Nono's identity to be more like her. Takuru is shocked, but ultimately accepts Senri's determination to find the killer and avenge Yui's death. Both Takuru and Mio conclude that the killer is a Gigalomaniac with the power to mind control other people, which is how all of the murder victims died in such mysterious ways and how the killer was always able to escape with no witnesses. Itou then regains consciousness in the hospital, only remembering that he was forced by two people to kill Yui. Senri disappears after studying the video of the first murder, and Takuru investigates and discovers a familiar sound in the background. He realizes to his horror that the sound is linked to one of the members in the Newspaper Club.
9	"Duel"; Transliteration: "Sakusō suru omowaku no iki tsuku tokoro" (Japanese: 錯綜する思惑の行き着くところ)	March 8, 2017
Senri confronts Serika on the school roof, asking her what her motive for the murders is. Serika then reveals her power is telepathy, and the two battle with their Di-swords. However, a side effect of their Di-swords clashing allows Senri to read Serika's mind as well, and she realizes that Serika is trying to achieve Takuru's innermost desires and make him happy. Senri then points out the contradiction in Serika's motive, reminding her of the despair Yui's death caused to Takuru. Senri then sets her Di-sword aside and tries to goad Serika into killing her. Takuru reaches the roof just in time to see Senri stabbed and gravely wounded by Serika, who leaves the scene. Afterwards, Senri is hospitalized for her injury while Takuru goes into hiding at Mio's office due to being labeled as the prime suspect the murders. Mio theorizes that the Gigalomaniacs were created at the moment of the earthquake when they suffered some type of stress, such as how Senri witnessing Nono's death gave her her power. After questioning Takuru about his past with Serika and seeing how his memories are not consistent with published records, Mio begins to suspect Serika is a delusion created by Takuru. Meanwhile, a wounded Serika is seen limping through the city streets.
10	"Memories Stalk You From the Past"; Transliteration: "Semari kuru kako no kioku" (Japanese: 迫りくる過去の記憶)	March 15, 2017
Takuru recounts his memories from back in 2004, when he was still in grade school. Back then, his parents were often away from home and never spent time with him, causing him to be lonely and introverted. His only solace was his childhood friendship with Serika, though it is evident that she was merely an imaginary friend. Takuru also admits that he followed the New Generation Madness murders closely, and came to idolize Takumi Nishijou, who was initially accused of being the murderer but proved his innocence and became a hero. When the Shibuya Earthquake struck, the stress caused from the event caused Takuru to manifest Serika as a real person. In the present, Serika arrives at Mio's office and confirms that she is a delusion created by Takuru whose sole purpose is to protect him. She then reveals that Sakuma is in fact the mastermind of the New New Generation Murders to eliminate the Gigalomaniacs and that she helped him in an effort to protect Takuru. Serika then threatens to kill Sakuma, and Sakuma gladly accepts her challenge and tells her to meet him at "the place where it all began."
11	"Takuru Miyashiro"; Transliteration: "Kare no tatakai" (Japanese: 彼の戦い)	March 22, 2017
Serika tells Takuru that she intends to confront Sakuma at the Theater Cube in Shibuya Square and leaves, telling him that her primary purpose is to protect him. However, after she leaves, she calls Takuru and admits that she murdered his parents during the Earthquake. Shocked, Takuru begins to realize that Serika is most likely lying about her motivations, and decides to go confront her. While Mio takes his friends to hide out in Akihabara, Takukru heads to the Theater Cube. There, Takuru encounters Serika but she attacks him, forcing Takuru to fight back and strangle her to death. However, the battle is revealed to have been a delusion created by Sakuma, who is wielding an artificial Di-sword. He reveals that he already killed Serika that he orchestrated the New Generation murders purely for fun, and is only interested in continuing his research on Gigalomaniacs. Enraged, Takuru manifests his own Di-sword and attacks Sakuma, damaging his equipment. However, Sakuma is able to retaliate and disables Takuru with another delusion designed to break his mind permanently.
12	"Serika Onoe"; Transliteration: "Kanojo no omowaku" (Japanese: 彼女の思惑)	March 29, 2017
Sakuma traps Takuru inside of a delusion that deprives him of all of his senses, which begins to cause Takuru to lose his sanity. In his desperation, he creates a delusion of Serika, who helps him overcome Sakuma's delusion. Takuru then battles with Sakuma, destroying his artificial Di-sword and killing him. At that moment, the previously thought dead Serika awakens and attacks Takuru. He is able to block her attack and inadvertently reads her mind when their Di-swords clash. He realizes that Serika was born out of Takuru's unconscious desire to be special and different from everybody else. To that end, Serika decided to manipulate Sakuma into reenacting the New Generation murders to provide a mystery for Takuru to solve. Then, once Sakuma was dead, Serika would have knocked Takuru out and released evidence implicating Sakuma in the murders, making Takuru a hero. Takuru is shocked to realize that the New New Generation murders are ultimately his fault, and decides to use his Di-sword to turn Serika into a normal girl. Takuru then turns himself in to the police, and at the same time, all of his friends fall unconscious. He later wakes up in a hospital bed with Mio and Shinjou watching over him. Serika also wakes up in her bed with tears in her eyes.

=== Film ===
Title	Premiere
"Chaos;Child: Silent Sky"	June 17, 2017 (theaters)
Serika is now living life as a normal girl with no memory of Takuru or any of the previous events, believing that she just has amnesia from an accident. However, during a trip to Shibuya, Serika learns about Chaos Child Syndrome, which is a disease that afflicted some Shibuya residents after the Shibuya Earthquake, giving them a withered, elderly appearance which they ignore by putting themselves in a delusional world where they believe they are still normal. Serika then begins receiving partial flashbacks of her previous life and is told to consult Mio. Mio reluctantly shows Serika that Senri, Hinae, Hana, and Uki are in comas following the events of Takuru's battle with Sakuma. She also introduces Serika to Takuru, who is the official culprit for the New Generation murders as well as the only person known to have recovered from Chaos Child Syndrome. Mio asks Serika about Wakui, who is in fact a Committee member who stole all of the information about the Chaos Child patients, and she vaguely recalls meeting him in a lab underneath her old school. Serika, Takuru, and Mio enter the lab, where Takuru has his brain scanned in order to create cure for Chaos Child Syndrome. Wakui confronts them, but does not interfere since it is also in his interest to see Chaos Child Syndrome cured. Serika and Takuru then part ways, and Serika decides to see a play, where she begins to regain her full memories. Afterwards, it is revealed that Senri, Hinae, Hana, and Uki have fully recovered from Chaos Child Syndrome, and plan to stay in contact with Takuru despite him likely being sent to jail. They also note how Serika has not come to visit them before continuing with their lives. Finally, Takuru leaves the hospital in preparation to be transferred to prison when he encounters Serika by chance. The two of them stare at one another before mutually parting ways, pretending not to know each other. Takuru reflects that this is the best and only way for the two of them to live normal lives.
