= Chaos;Child (TV series) =

Japanese anime television series

- Key visual, featuring the main cast
- Genre: Science fiction, thriller
- Anime television series
- Directed by: Masato Jinbo
- Produced by: Makoto Chiba; Takashi Watanabe; Masato Kasai; Hayato Kaneko; Jun Fukuda; Noritomo Isogai; Mitsuhiro Ogata; Yūki Kurosaki; Seon-yi Kim; Haruyuki Kaneko
- Written by: Masato Jinbo
- Music by: Takeshi Abo; Onoken
- Studio: Silver Link
- Licensed by: Crunchyroll
- Original network: AT-X, Tokyo MX, SUN, Chiba TV, TVK, TVS, KBS, BS11
- English network: SEA: Animax Asia
- Original run: January 11, 2017 – March 29, 2017
- Episodes: 12
- Anime film

Chaos;Child: Silent Sky
- Directed by: Masato Jinbo
- Produced by: Makoto Chiba; Takashi Watanabe; Masato Kasai; Hayato Kaneko; Jun Fukuda; Noritomo Isogai; Mitsuhiro Ogata; Yūki Kurosaki; Seon-yi Kim; Haruyuki Kaneko
- Written by: Masato Jinbo
- Music by: Takeshi Abo; Onoken
- Studio: Silver Link
- Licensed by: NA: Funimation
- Released: June 17, 2017
- Runtime: 49 minutes

Chaos;Child (stylized as ChäoS;Child) is a Japanese anime television series based on the visual novel of the same name created by Mages and Nitroplus, and is part of the Science Adventure franchise. It was directed by Masato Jinbo at Silver Link, with music by Takeshi Abo and Onoken, and with main cast members from the video game reprising their roles.

== Synopsis ==
Chaos;Child follows Takuru Miyashiro, who investigates the "New Generation Madness Resurgence" serial killings together with the members of the high school newspaper club he is the president of.

== Cast ==
Character	Voice actor	
Character	Japanese	English
Takuru Miyashiro	Yoshitsugu Matsuoka	Ricco Fajardo
Serika Onoe	Sumire Uesaka	Felecia Angelle
Nono Kurusu	Sarah Emi Bridcutt	Alex Moore
Hinae Arimura	Suzuko Mimori	Bryn Apprill
Hana Kazuki	Sayaka Nakaya	Didi Archilla
Uki Yamazoe	Inori Minase	Kristi Kang
Mio Kunosato	Asami Sanada	Dawn M. Bennett
Shinji Itō	Yuuki Fujiwara	Z. Charles Bolton
Masashi Kawahara	Atsushi Abe	Seth Magill
Yui Tachibana	Yumi Hara	Tia Ballard
Yūto Tachibana	Kokoro Kikuchi	Jill Harris
Takeshi Shinjō	Takuya Kirimoto	Anthony Bowling
Katsuko Momose	Kujira	Jennifer Green
Wataru Sakuma	Tomoyuki Shimura	Phil Parsons
Shūichi Wakui	Masayuki Katou	Kent Williams

== Production and release ==
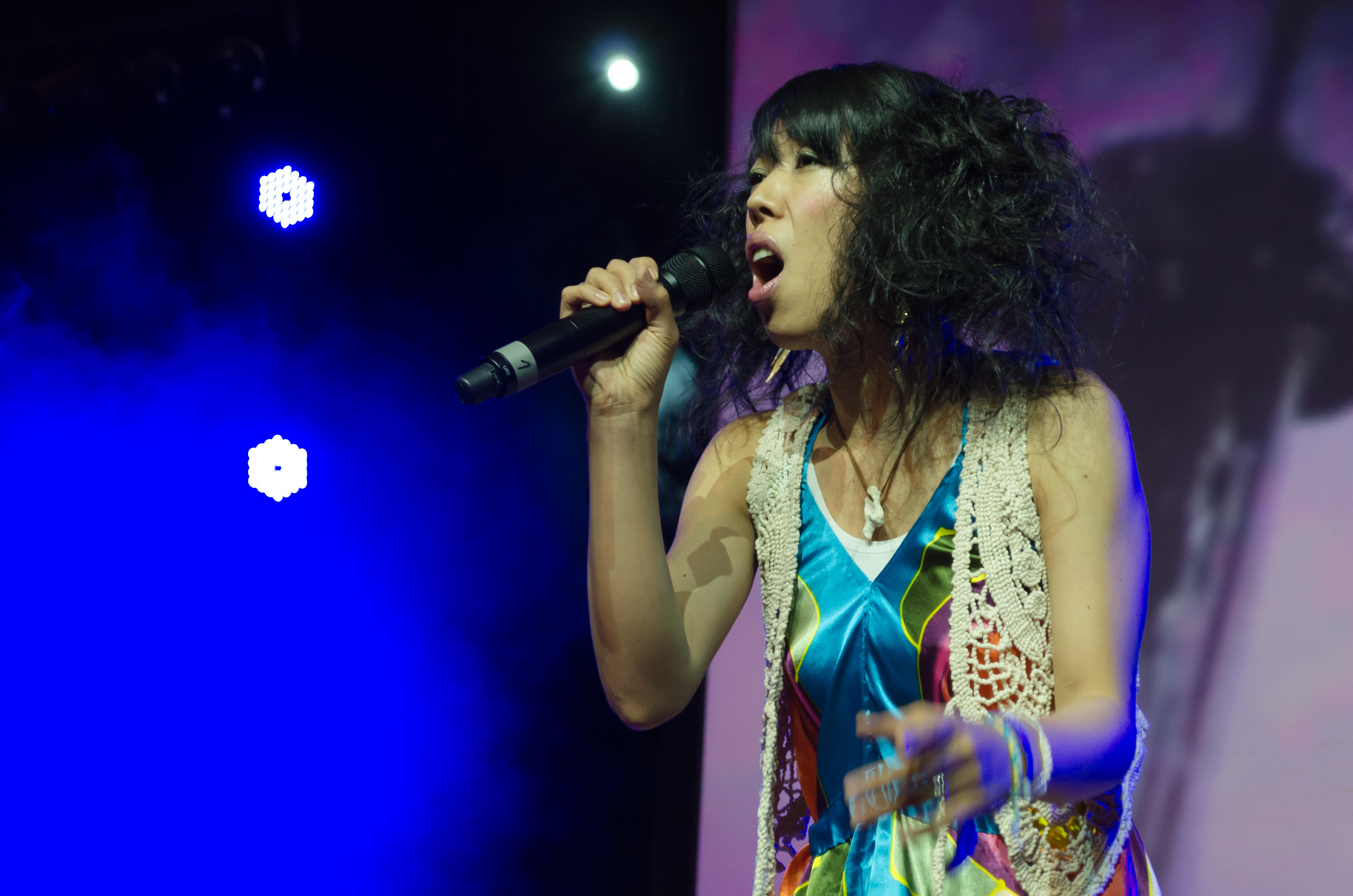
Kanako Itō performed the opening theme, "Uncontrollable".

Chaos;Child is an adaptation of the video game of the same name, and was produced at the animation studio Silver Link. It was directed by Masato Jinbo, who also was in charge of the series composition, while Kazuyuki Yamayoshi was the chief animation director and handled the adaptation of the character designs for animation. The music was composed by Takeshi Abo and Onoken; the former also composed the music for the Chaos;Child game. The opening theme song, "Uncontrollable", was performed by Kanako Itō, while the ending theme, "Chaos Syndrome", was performed by Konomi Suzuki. The main cast members from the Chaos;Child game reprised their roles for the anime, and were joined by new actors for other characters.

Chiyomaru Shikura, the Representative Director of the Chaos;Child game's development company, had originally wanted to make the anime series two cours long, like the Steins;Gate anime adaptation, but it was determined impossible business-wise, so it was decided to produce it as a one-cours series. Due to this lower episode count, they were unable to adapt the character routes from the game's branching narrative. Shikura mentioned that he had particularly wanted to see the Sumo Sticker giant and the appearance of Chaos;Head protagonist Takumi from Hana's route adapted as part of the Chaos;Child anime.

The series was announced in March 2015, and premiered on AT-X on January 11, 2017, as a one-hour special; the series also airs on Tokyo MX, Sun TV, Chiba TV, TVK, TVS, KBS and BS11. Crunchyroll streamed the series worldwide outside of Asian countries and Funimation released an English dub starting on January 31, 2017. The series is planned to be released on DVD and Blu-ray in Japan by Kadokawa Corporation in six volumes, between March 24 and August 25, 2017; the first volume will come bundled with an audio drama. The singles for the opening and ending themes were published on January 25 and February 22, 2017, respectively. To coincide with the anime and the release of the spin-off video game Chaos;Child Love Chu Chu!!, the Chaos;Child game got a budget-priced re-release in March 2017.

After the conclusion of the 12th and final episode, a 13th episode based on the "Silent Sky" ending of the game was announced, and was shown in Japanese theaters between June 17, 2017, and June 30, 2017.

== Reception ==
=== Previews ===
Richard Eisenbeis of Anime Now called the series his most anticipated anime of the season, being curious about how it would handle the adaptation of a branching story into a single one. Bamboo Dong, Paul Jensen, Rebecca Silverman and Theron Martin at Anime News Network reviewed episode 0 and 1 as part of a preview of that anime season. Dong did not expect the anime's ending to be good, but was still interested in how the story would turn out, and appreciated the use of Chaos;Head-like visuals and atmosphere. Jensen did not, however, think the atmosphere worked, saying that it seemed like the show was intended to give a feeling of dread, but that it failed to do so, partially due to the large amount of information communicated to the viewer. Silverman thought episode 1, with the exception of some sequences, felt bland, but still worth watching for a few more episodes to get a grasp of what direction the story would take. Martin thought the story moved slightly too fast, resulting in some character motivations being weakly established. He enjoyed the visuals and music, but said that the character design, while attractive, looked unoriginal.

=== Series reception ===
Anime Now included Chaos;Child on a list of the five "must-watch" anime of the season, citing the high tension and weirdness of the story and the complexity of the characters.
