= Chaos;Head (TV series) =

Japanese anime television series

- Cover art for the home media release, featuring the character Rimi Sakihata

カオスヘッド (Kaosu Heddo)
- Genre: Mystery, suspense
- Created by: 5pb.; Nitroplus; Red Flagship
- Anime television series
- Directed by: Takaaki Ishiyama
- Produced by: Hiroaki Tsunoda; Yasuo Ueda; Fuminori Hara; Yūsuke Numagi; Michiko Koyanagi
- Written by: Toshiki Inoue
- Music by: tOkyO
- Studio: Madhouse
- Licensed by: AUS: Madman Entertainment; NA: Funimation; UK: Manga Entertainment
- Original network: Chiba TV, TV Saitama, TVK, Tokyo MX, Kids Station
- Original run: October 15, 2008 – December 31, 2008
- Episodes: 12

Chaos;Head (Japanese: カオスヘッド, Hepburn: Kaosu Heddo; stylized in all capitals) is a Japanese anime television series produced by Madhouse based on 5pb. and Nitroplus's video game of the same name, and is part of the Science Adventure franchise. It is set in Shibuya, Tokyo, and follows Takumi Nishijo, a high school student who develops paranoia and delusions after having witnessed one of a series of murders. He meets several girls who have an interest in him, and who he suspects might have a connection to the murders. He eventually learns of the existence of people with the power to project delusions onto others' minds, and of an organization using a machine to do so artificially for their own gain.

The series was directed by Takaaki Ishiyama, with Toshiki Inoue handling series composition, Hidekazu Shimamura designing the characters based on CHOCO and Mutsumi Sasaki's original concept and tOkyO composing the music. It has been released on home media by VAP in Japan, Funimation in North America, Madman Entertainment in Australia, and Manga Entertainment in the United Kingdom. Reviewers have been mostly critical of the story; while some still found it engaging, it was generally considered confusing. The animation and visuals received a wide range of opinions from critics, while the series' soundtrack received praise.

== Plot ==
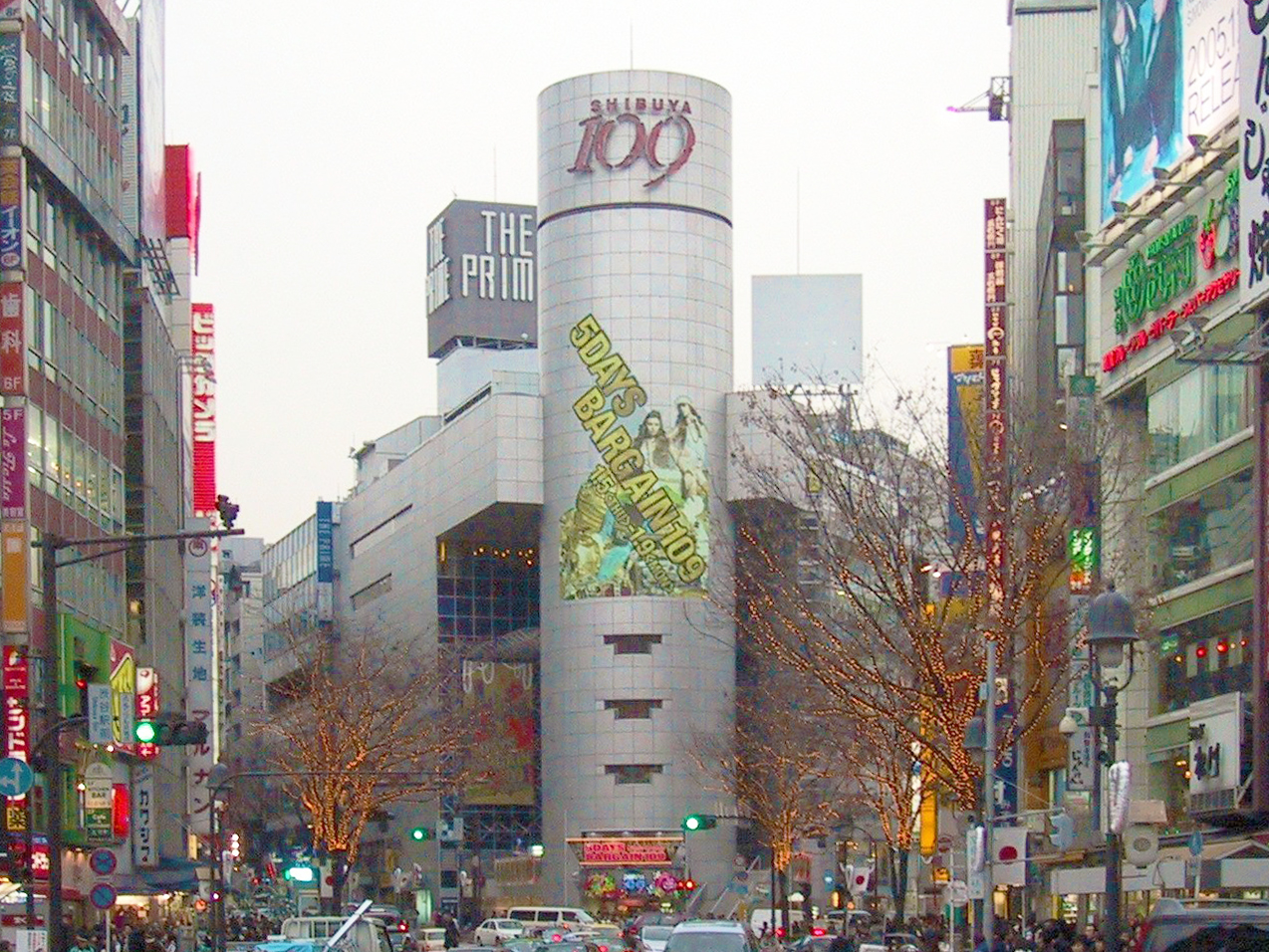
The series is set in Shibuya, Tokyo.

Chaos;Head follows Takumi Nishijo, a high school student living in a cargo crate atop a building in Shibuya, Tokyo. One day, he is sent pictures over the internet, depicting a murder in an alley; he later witnesses a murder resembling the one in the pictures, and believes the killer to be a pink-haired girl he sees at the crime scene. Because of his presence at the scene of the crime, he is suspected of being the murderer, and develops paranoia and experiencing delusions. More murders – referred to as the New Generation serial murders – occur, while Takumi meets a number of girls who have an interest in him, but who he suspects of being linked to the murders. One of them is the pink-haired girl, named Rimi, who claims to be friends with him despite him not having any previous memory of her.

Takumi learns of the existence of people called "gigalomaniacs", who can use special powers to project delusions onto others' minds; they can also project delusions into reality, which is referred to as "real-booting". Takumi and several of the girls he met are revealed to be such individuals, and can use illusory "Di-Sword" weapons projected into reality. The Nozomi Group in Shibuya is revealed to have created a synthetic gigalomaniac machine called the Noah II, which they use for their own gain, causing people to panic from experiencing delusions. Takumi learns that he is an artificial delusional clone with fabricated memories, created by the real Takumi to stop the Nozomi Group from taking over humanity. He did this as his body had been aged from overuse of gigalomaniac powers, hindering him from stopping the Nozomi Group personally. Takumi reveals the nurse Hazuki as the criminal behind the murders by projecting her memories onto screens on buildings, and destroys the Noah II and Nozomi's president with his Di-Sword. The real Takumi dies, leaving Takumi to take his place and keep on living.

== Cast ==
Character	Japanese	English
Takumi Nishijo	Hiroyuki Yoshino	Todd Haberkorn
Rimi Sakihata	Eri Kitamura	Carrie Savage
Yua Kusunoki	Chiaki Takahashi	Colleen Clinkenbeard
Nanami Nishijo	Ui Miyazaki	Brittney Karbowski
Ayase Kishimoto	Yui Sakakibara	Stephanie Sheh
Sena Aoi	Hitomi Nabatame	Clarine Harp
Kozue Orihara	Ayumi Tsuji	Kara Edwards
Daisuke Misumi	Daisuke Ono	Joel McDonald

== Production and release ==
Chaos;Head is an adaptation of the video game of the same name, which was developed by 5pb. and Nitroplus. The series was directed by Takaaki Ishiyama at the animation studio Madhouse, with character design by Shuichi Shimamura and script supervision by Toshiki Inoue. Takeshi Abo, the composer for the Chaos;Head video game, was credited for the anime's soundtrack, but did not have a large role in the anime's production. The opening theme is "F.D.D." by Kanako Itō and the ending theme is "Super Special" by Seira Kagami.

The series was announced in July 2008 through the magazines Dengeki Daioh and Monthly Comic Alive, and premiered on Japanese television on October 15, 2008, airing weekly for twelve episodes until the series finale on December 31, 2008, on Chiba TV, TV Saitama, TVK, Tokyo MX, and Kids Station. It was released by VAP in DVD volumes in Japan, starting on March 4, 2009; the first DVD volume was the fourteenth best selling animation DVD in Japan during its release week. Funimation acquired the license for the North American rights for the series in 2010, and released it on DVD and Blu-ray on November 29, 2011, in both a limited edition and a regular release; a budget-priced re-release followed on January 13, 2015. Madman Entertainment acquired the license for the Australian rights in 2011, and released it on DVD and Blu-ray on February 15, 2012. Manga Entertainment licensed the series for the United Kingdom, and released it on DVD on October 22, 2012.

== Reception ==
=== Previews ===
Casey Brienza, Carlo Santos, Carl Kimlinger and Theron Martin at Anime News Network (ANN) reviewed the first episode as part of a "fall 2008 anime preview guide". Brienza called the series "thoroughly enthralling" when at its best, and said that its imagery of death and destruction would be intriguing to viewers interested in apocalypse-themed works. She found the opening and ending themes "bright but boring", and noted that they were at odds with the story. Santos, too, disliked the ending theme, combined with Takumi being an otaku with an imaginary girlfriend, saying that despite being "tongue-in-cheek" it felt too overt and annoying: he felt that Takumi's growing paranoia, the music and the art direction of the graphically violent scenes worked well to set the tone, but that the "fluff" involving Takumi's imaginary girlfriend and his sister disrupted the mood. Kimlinger also noted the inconsistent tone, and called the female characters "painfully artificial". He was not opposed to the combination of the themes of "otaku alienation" and horror, but called the series' horror mystery an uninteresting mix of Higurashi When They Cry and Japanese psychological horror films. Martin called the series a contender for "weirdest" anime of the season, and also compared the tone to that of Higurashi When They Cry. He liked the visuals and music, calling the latter "eerie" and effective.

=== Series reception ===
Reviewing the series as a whole, Santos found it uneven, with the story elements ranging from being "brilliant jaw-droppers" to feeling unfinished, giving the revelation of Takumi's true nature as an example of the former, and the conclusions to some character sub-plots as examples of the latter. Luke Carroll at ANN and John Rose at The Fandom Post were critical of the story, saying that while its ideas and the question of what is and isn't real was interesting, the story felt rushed, with the game's narrative "squeezed" into too few episodes. Rose additionally was disappointed in how the answers felt less innovative than the mysteries originally seemed. The story was criticized by several reviewers as feeling confusing, with Bradley Meek at T.H.E.M. Anime Reviews finding it confusing enough to quit watching after the eighth episode, and Erin Finnegan at ANN calling it unwatchable due to how little it made sense to them, despite a promising start. Chris Homer and Chris Beveridge, both at The Fandom Post, found the story engaging, however, with the latter calling the climax "solid".

Santos said that the series' "pseudoscience" felt dubious, but noted the illusory "Di-Swords" as well-designed and a useful way to portray characters battling through the use of their thoughts; Carroll also enjoyed the use of "Di-Swords" in action scenes, but thought that it occurred too rarely. Beveridge similarly liked the detailed visuals for the special abilities some characters use. Santos and Carroll both disliked the character designs, calling them bland and stereotypical; Beveridge, however, liked them, and appreciated their "solid feel". Santos, Carroll and Meek disliked the animation, with the former two citing off-model characters, frozen crowds, static conversation scenes and a lack of fluidity, and Meek calling it "a black mark on Madhouse's usually stellar record". Rose, however, felt that the animation was "fairly strong".

Carroll and Santos enjoyed the soundtrack, with Caroll calling it "surprisingly well done". Santos particularly noted the dissonance and silence used to portray the unrest and turmoil inside Takumi's mind and the contrasting piano melodies used when Takumi forms emotional connections to others as positives. Santos and Carroll enjoyed Haberkorn's performance as Takumi, but found the remaining roles less well done; Santos said that most female characters were handled like "plastic dating-sim stereotypes". Finnegan, however, liked Karbowski's performance as Nanami, and compared it favorably to how the character sounded in Japanese.
