= Chaos;Child Love Chu Chu!! =

2017 video game

- Cover art, featuring Takuru Miyashiro (left) and Serika Onoe (right)
- Developer: Mages
- Publisher: 5pb.
- Director: Yusuke Matsumoto
- Producer: Tatsuya Matsubara
- Artist: Mutsumi Sasaki
- Writers: Eiji Umehara; Masashi Takimoto; Toru Yasumoto; Tsukasa Tsuchiya
- Composer: Takeshi Abo
- Series: Science Adventure
- Platforms: PlayStation 4; PlayStation Vita
- Release: JP: March 30, 2017
- Genre: Visual novel
- Mode: Single-player

Chaos;Child Love Chu Chu!! (Note: Chaos;Child Love Chu Chu!! (Japanese: カオスチャイルド らぶchu☆chu!!, Hepburn: Kaosu Chairudo Rabu Chu Chu!!; stylized as ChäoS;Child)) is a 2017 visual novel video game developed and published by Mages for the PlayStation 4 and PlayStation Vita on March 30, 2017, in Japan. It is a fan disc for the 2014 game Chaos;Child, and part of the larger Science Adventure series. The story, which is affected by player choices, is set in Shibuya, Tokyo after the events of Chaos;Child, and follows Takuru Miyashiro, who ignores the "Return of the New Generation Madness" events, instead choosing to spend time with women.

== Gameplay ==
The player causes the game's plot to branch by answering questionnaires in an in-game magazine.

Chaos;Child Love Chu Chu!! is a visual novel in which the story is affected by player choices: the player regularly uses the "Yes/No Trigger" system, in which they fill in "yes/no" questionnaires in the in-game magazine Cool Cat Press, and the returning "Delusion Trigger" system, in which the player chooses whether the player character should experience a positive or negative delusion. The player's choices in these cause the story to branch, affect characters' reactions, and let the player experience different scenes.

== Synopsis ==
The game is a spin-off from Chaos;Child, set in October 2015 in Shibuya, Tokyo. Bizarre events referred to as the "Return of the New Generation Madness" take place, but do not interest the protagonist Takuru Miyashiro, the president of the school newspaper club; instead, he wants to focus on "real-life activities", and spend time with women.

=== Plot ===
In the beginning of the game, set after the events of Chaos;Child, Mio Kunosato is contacted by detective Takeshi Shinjo, and taken to the hospital, where he shows her a Chaos Child Syndrome (CCS) patient who still exhibits the symptoms even though all other patients have been cured. Reading the patient's documents, they find a reference to the ability to change causality, as well as a report from Shuichi Wakui mentioning that the patient has been kept unconscious due to her ability, and he plans to use it to change the outcome of events in Chaos;Head. Looking up from the report, Mio sees not Shinjo in front of her, but Wakui. The patient opens her eyes and the world changes.

Back in October, Takuru and the newspaper club discuss the "Return of the New Generation Madness" incidents which took place in Chaos;Child – but which have been altered, all ending non-fatally – but they end up deciding that the events are nonsensical and decide to find another topic to cover. Eventually they decide to try making a "yes/no" questionnaire like in the Cool Cat Press magazine; Takuru takes the quiz from Cool Cat Press, and the story branches into different routes depending on the result.

== Development and release ==
Love Chu Chu!! was developed by 5pb., and was planned by Chiyomaru Shikura, produced by Tatsuya Matsubara, and directed by Yusuke Matsumoto, with main character designs by Mutsumi Sasaki, and music by Takeshi Abo. The scenario was written by Masashi Takimoto, Toru Yasumoto and Tsukasa Tsuchiya, under supervision by Eiji Umehara. Risa Taneda, who voiced Mio in the original Chaos;Child, did not reprise her role for Love Chu Chu!!; it was taken over by Asami Sanada after Taneda took a hiatus from her voice acting career for medical treatment. The opening theme, "Higori Teki Katsu Teisei Funo na Omoikomi" (非合理的かつ訂正不能な思い込み; "Irrational and Uncorrectable Beliefs"), was performed by the group Junjō no Afilia, and the ending theme, "Zaishou no Lucifer" (罪証のルシファー; "Evidence of Lucifer"), by the group Iketeru Hearts.

The game was first announced by Shikura in September 2016, and was presented in Famitsu in November 2016, where its platforms and release date were revealed; at this point, development was said to be 30% finished. The "yes/no" questionnaire was added as a new take on the series' "trigger system" of determining story outcomes.

Love Chu Chu!! was released for the PlayStation 4 and PlayStation Vita on March 30, 2017, in Japan, in both a standard release and a limited edition. The latter includes a pillow cover, a school calendar, an original soundtrack album, and other items; certain retailers also included a tapestry featuring a nude illustration of the character Serika Onoe. The cover art for the limited edition was based on that of the original Chaos;Child's limited edition Xbox One release, featuring the same composition, but with the characters depicted in just their underwear. In March 2018, the PlayStation 4 version was added to the PlayStation Now cloud gaming service in Japan. Digital Touch released the PlayStation 4 version in South Korea on June 21, 2018. The opening and ending themes were released as singles on April 19, 2017, and March 29, 2017, respectively.

== Reception ==
Famitsu and Gameshot were surprised by the game, considering it seemingly uncharacteristic for Chaos;Child with its markedly different atmosphere, although Famitsu still called it a "heart-pounding" love story, and Gameshot appreciated how it still felt like an authentic sequel rather than just a fan disc, taking place after the original's main story. Gameshot did find some of the game's routes lacking, particularly calling the ending dissatisfying, but thought it felt more cohesive than previous side games in the series such as Chaos;Head Love Chu Chu! and Steins;Gate: My Darling's Embrace, and recommended it to series fans who like the Chaos;Child cast. Famitsu liked the limited edition Serika tapestry, describing it as "irresistible" for fans of the character.

The PlayStation Vita version was the 18th best-selling physical game in Japan during its opening week, selling 6,240 copies; meanwhile, the PlayStation 4 version did not appear on Media Create's weekly top 20 chart. The game's opening theme charted on the Oricon Singles Chart in Japan for three weeks, peaking at 6th place, and the ending theme charted for one week at 16th place.
