= Chaos;Child =

2014 video game

- Cover art featuring Takuru Miyashiro
- Developer: Mages
- Publishers: JP: 5pb.; NA/EU: PQube (PS4, Vita); WW: Spike Chunsoft (PC, Switch)
- Directors: Yuusuke Matsumoto; Toshihiko Kajioka
- Producer: Tatsuya Matsubara
- Artists: Mutsumi Sasaki; Yukihiro Matsuo; Kanji Wakabayashi
- Writers: Chiyomaru Shikura; Naotaka Hayashi; Eiji Umehara
- Composer: Takeshi Abo
- Series: Science Adventure
- Platforms: Xbox One; PlayStation 3; PlayStation 4; PlayStation Vita; Microsoft Windows; iOS; Android; Nintendo Switch
- Release: December 18, 2014: Xbox One; JP: December 18, 2014 PlayStation 3; JP: June 25, 2015 PS4, PS Vita; JP: June 25, 2015; EU: October 13, 2017; NA: October 17, 2017 Microsoft Windows; JP: April 28, 2016; WW: January 22, 2019 iOS; JP: January 31, 2017 Android; JP: May 28, 2017 Nintendo Switch; JP: February 24, 2022; WW: October 7, 2022
- Genre: Visual novel
- Mode: Single-player

Chaos;Child (stylized as ChäoS;Child) is a 2014 visual novel video game developed by Mages. It is the fourth main entry in the Science Adventure series and a thematic sequel to Chaos;Head Noah. It was initially released for Xbox One, and later for PlayStation 3, PlayStation 4, PlayStation Vita, Microsoft Windows, iOS, Android, and Nintendo Switch. An English localization was released for the PlayStation 4 and PlayStation Vita by PQube in 2017, and for Windows and Switch by Spike Chunsoft in 2019.

The player takes the role of Takuru Miyashiro, the president of his school's newspaper club, who investigates the "Return of the New Generation Madness" serial murder case with his friends. Chaos;Child is the second game in the series to use the "Delusion Trigger" system as the primary form of interaction. Functionally identical to the system in Chaos;Head, the player is periodically prompted with 3 options and must decide whether Takuru will: have a positive delusion, have a negative delusion or have no delusions and continue normally.

The game was created to have "psycho-suspense" elements similar to Chaos;Head, while also adding a larger amount of horror elements. For the game's aesthetic, the developers aimed for it to be "unmoving", in contrast to the previous game in the series, Robotics;Notes (2012). The music was composed by Takeshi Abo based on notes of his impressions of the story and emotional flow, to ensure a good relationship to the game's worldview. The English localization was handled by Adam Lensenmayer, whose experience with translating the Science Adventure game Steins;Gate 0 (2015) ensured a smoother process, with a lot of communication with the developers.

Chaos;Child was well received by critics, but underperformed commercially; this led to the development of Steins;???, which relates to the more popular Science Adventure game Steins;Gate similarly to how Chaos;Child relates to Chaos;Head. Other Chaos;Child media includes an anime series, two manga, an audio drama, and the video game Chaos;Child Love Chu Chu!!.

== Gameplay ==
Chaos;Child is an ADV-style (Note: In this context, "ADV" refers to the style of textboxes used in a visual novel.) visual novel game, but features two main unconventional forms of interaction:

=== Delusion Trigger ===
The "Delusion Trigger" system, appearing in a segment involving Serika Onoe.

The player must choose between a positive or negative delusion, or ignore the prompt entirely. Once a trigger point is reached, the game is interrupted by a short visual sequence before it changes into a non-canonical point of view signified by either blue (positive) or red (negative) borders around the screen. If the player did not make a selection by the time the trigger point is reached, the options will disappear and the game will continue normally.

Delusion choices are inconsequential during the first playthrough. During subsequent playthroughs after the required "common" route is completed, a specific set of positive and negative delusions may be triggered by the player in order to reach the other endings of the game.

=== Mapping Trigger ===
The player must make correct selections on the chalkboard inside the newspaper club, usually between sticky notes or pictures. Mapping Trigger is less common and functions as a puzzle minigame. While there are a few exceptions, (Note: Repeatedly making an incorrect selection will lead to a "bad" ending in a specific instance of Mapping Trigger.) (Note: In one of the character routes, the Mapping Trigger choices the player has made will determine the ending they will reach.) it is largely inconsequential as the player is sent back to the options if they make an incorrect choice.

== Synopsis ==
=== Setting and characters ===
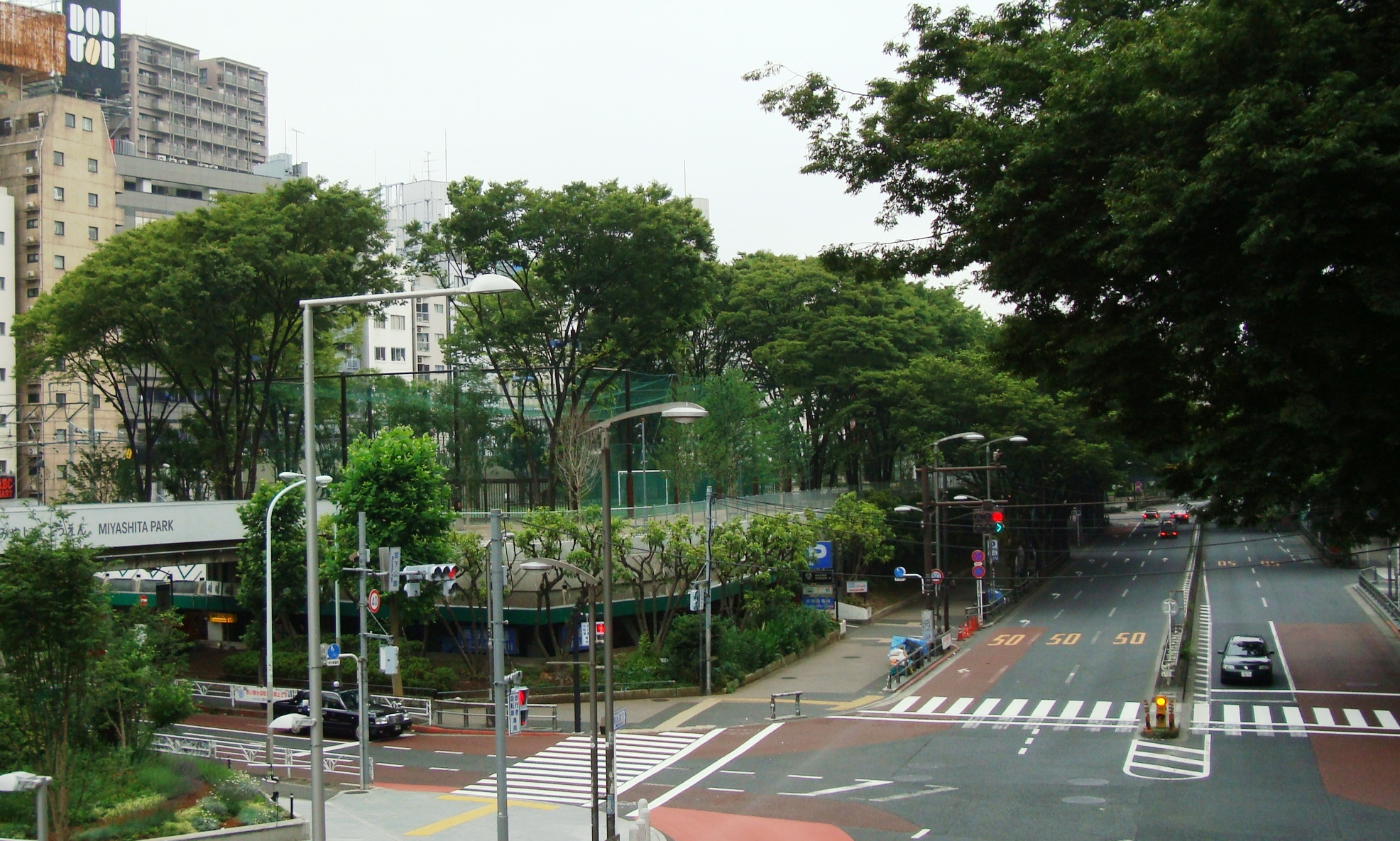
Takuru lives in a caravan trailer by Miyashita Park in Shibuya.

Chaos;Child is set in Shibuya in 2015, six years after the events of Chaos;Head, where an earthquake nearly leveled the area. Shibuya has since been rebuilt, but a new series of odd killings begin to occur on the same days of the "New Generation" murders, dubbed the "Return of the New Generation Madness" murders and marked by stickers of a two-faced man called "Sumo Stickers" left at the crime scenes. Several characters have awakened to psychic abilities in the wake of the earthquake, such as pyrokinesis or being able to spot lies with absolute certainty; such individuals are referred to as Gigalomaniacs, and use their abilities by making delusions come true in the real world ("real-booting") through the manifestation of a Di-Sword, which connects them to the Dirac sea.

The story follows a group of high school students at Hekiho Academy who survived the earthquake: the player takes the role of Takuru Miyashiro, the president of Hekiho's newspaper club, whose family died in the earthquake. Other major characters include the newspaper club members – Takuru's childhood friend Serika Onoe, his foster older sister Nono Kurusu, and Hana Kazuki and Shinji Itou – and Shuichi Wakui, the teacher overseeing the club, and the misanthrope Mio Kunosato who aids the police and works with detective Takeshi Shinjo. Takuru and Nono live with their foster siblings Yui and Yuto Tachibana and their foster father Wataru Sakuma at Aoba Dorm, a combined foster home and medical clinic, although Takuru also stays in a caravan trailer by Miyashita Park.

=== Plot ===
In 2015, six years after the New Generation serial killings and the Shibuya Earthquake, high schooler Takuru Miyashiro is searching for a story to cover for his school's newspaper club. After looking into the cases of two recent deaths, Takuru notices that the killings are mimicking the New Generation Killings from six years ago and are occurring on the same dates.

Despite the objections of his foster sister Nono Kurusu, Takuru and the rest of the newspaper club, including childhood friend Serika Onoe, Shinji Itou, and Hana Kazuki, begin to investigate the killings with the goal of exposing the culprit themselves. Along the way, Takuru meets characters such as Literature Club member Hinae Arimura, the cold and calculating Mio Kunosato, detective Shinjo Takeshi, and young Uki Yamazoe.

Mio reveals the existence of Gigalomaniacs, people who have the ability to manifest delusions into reality. After meeting with Hinae, who is also a Gigalomaniac, Mio and Hinae deduce that Takuru must be a gigalomanic with the ability of telekinesis.

Hinae and Takuru are attacked by a pyrokinetic Gigalomaniac, assumed to be Senri Minamisawa, an old friend of Nono's who presumably died in the earthquake. Takuru remembers back to his childhood, where he found Senri being experimented on while exploring the hospital. He assumes that Senri is upset that Takuru never stopped to help her, and is attacking him in revenge.

Shinji murders Takuru's younger foster sister Yui, claiming that he was in love with Senri and wanted to exact revenge on Takuru for abandoning her at the hospital. When Nono proves it was impossible for Shinji and Senri to have met in the past, Shinji has a mental breakdown and collapses.

Nono soon finds evidence to implicate Serika. She confronts Serika on the school rooftop, where they reveal themselves as Gigalomaniacs and fight each other. Takuru arrives shortly after, to witness Nono killed as a result of the fight. Takuru is officially implicated for the murders with the news widely spreading across Shibuya.

It is revealed that Serika was actually Takuru's imaginary friend, who he booted into reality when he awoke as a Gigalomaniac. Serika reveals she is working with Sakuma Wataru, Takuru's foster father, to orchestrate the killings.

Sakuma, who has rebuilt an artificial Gigalomaniac device from the wreckage of Noah II, fights with Takuru, revealing that his motivation was simply to have fun torturing and experimenting on Gigalomaniacs. Takuru wins the fight, killing Sakuma. Serika soon shows up and reveals that she was created with a purpose: to give Takuru something to do, and help him do it. As Takuru was a fan of the original New Generation killings, Serika orchestrated the copycat killings to have Takuru solve it, and become a hero in the process. Refusing to let his original wish play out, Takuru uses his powers to wipe Serika's memory and free her from his wish. Takuru is later arrested for the murders.

Character routes are unlocked, revealing Hinae's backstory of losing her brother in the earthquake, Kazuki's status as a Gigalomaniac, teacher and club advisor Wakui Shuuichi as a member of the Committee of 300, and Nono as the real Senri Minamisawa.

After the Character routes are completed, the True End is revealed. Serika wakes up three months later, with little memory of who she was before. She finds herself drawn to Shibuya, where she meets Mio, Shinjo, and Takuru. Mio introduces her to Chaos Child Syndrome, in which its affected are trapped in a synchronized delusion, causing rapid aging in the process. They travel to a facility underneath the school, where they free everyone from the syndrome.

Weeks later, Takuru is to be transferred to a prison. On his way out of the hospital, he encounters Serika. Passing each other, he and Serika both claim that they do not know each other, and they will live their lives apart.

== Development ==
The game was developed by Mages, based on an original plan by Chiyomaru Shikura, the head of the company. It was produced by Tatsuya Matsubara and directed by Kanji Wakabayashi, and was written by Eiji Umehara, Masashi Takimoto and Tōru Yasumoto under supervision by Naotaka Hayashi. Several artists worked on the game: Mutsumi Sasaki designed the main characters, Yukihiro Matsuo designed minor characters and uniforms, and Choco designed the characters' Di-Swords. The game made use of "psycho-suspense" elements similar to those in Chaos;Head, but with an increased amount of horror elements. For the game's look, the developers were aiming for an "unmoving aesthetic" as opposed to the "moving adventure" style of the previous Science Adventure game, Robotics;Notes. To create subtle differences in the game's atmosphere, four different graphics shaders were implemented. For the Xbox One version of the game, the developers made use of the console's controller to play the in-game phone calls; this and some other features had to be changed when the game was ported to other platforms.

The music was composed by Takeshi Abo, who used the same technique as for his previous works in the Science Adventure series: he started by reading the game's story, to understand the setting and characters as fully as possible, and wrote down his first impressions of the events in the plot, as well as of the plot's emotional flow. He considered these first impressions to be very important, and used them to create a musical worldview. According to Abo, this method takes longer than just designating songs to various areas in the game, but allows him to create higher quality music with a better relationship to the game's worldview. The "image" used for the composition was different than for previous games in the series: while he described Chaos;Head as rainy, Steins;Gate as cloudy, and Robotics;Notes as clear weather, he called Chaos;Child "stormy", and contrasted its "black-and-white" image with Robotics;Notes's "colorful and emotional hues". Because he found the game's story compelling, he enjoyed composing the music and wanted to create even more for it by the end of the project.

=== Localization ===
Chaos;Child was localized by Adam Lensenmayer, who previously worked on the localizations of Steins;Gate 0 and of the anime adaptation of Steins;Gate. He was the only translator working on the localization; this was done as he and the developers wanted to ensure consistency in the way each character speaks and in the feeling of the game, as having multiple translators work on a single project can lead to differing interpretations of the story and of characters' personalities. He had not played the game prior to the start of localization, so after finishing his first translation pass of the script, he went through it in full a second time to correct things he had originally misunderstood due to not knowing how the story plays out.

While Lensenmayer described the translation itself as straightforward, due to the Japanese dialogue being easily understandable, he found the game exhausting to work on, giving quality control of the game's opening sequence as an example: he had to keep watching the opening to check text that is only displayed briefly on-screen, and thus had to see a character choking to death many times. The localization was additionally a large project with a script 30–40% larger than Steins;Gate 0's, taking most of the remainder of 2016 to finish following the completion of the Steins;Gate 0 localization. Due to the experience of having worked together with the developers on the localization of Steins;Gate 0, the process was however smoother, with a lot of communication back and forth on how to localize various things. The localization took fan feedback into account: after Lensenmayer had submitted the localized script, he worked on the translation of the Chaos;Child anime adaptation, and read comments about how some translation choices in the anime were inconsistent with their use in Chaos;Head, such as the rendering of a phrase as "Those eyes! Whose eyes?" rather than "Whose eyes are those eyes?!". Contacting the developers, he was able to get most such instances changed in the game script. A fan-made patch containing further consistency fixes with other games in the series, along with translations of some previously untranslated graphics, was released for the Windows version in 2019.

== Release ==
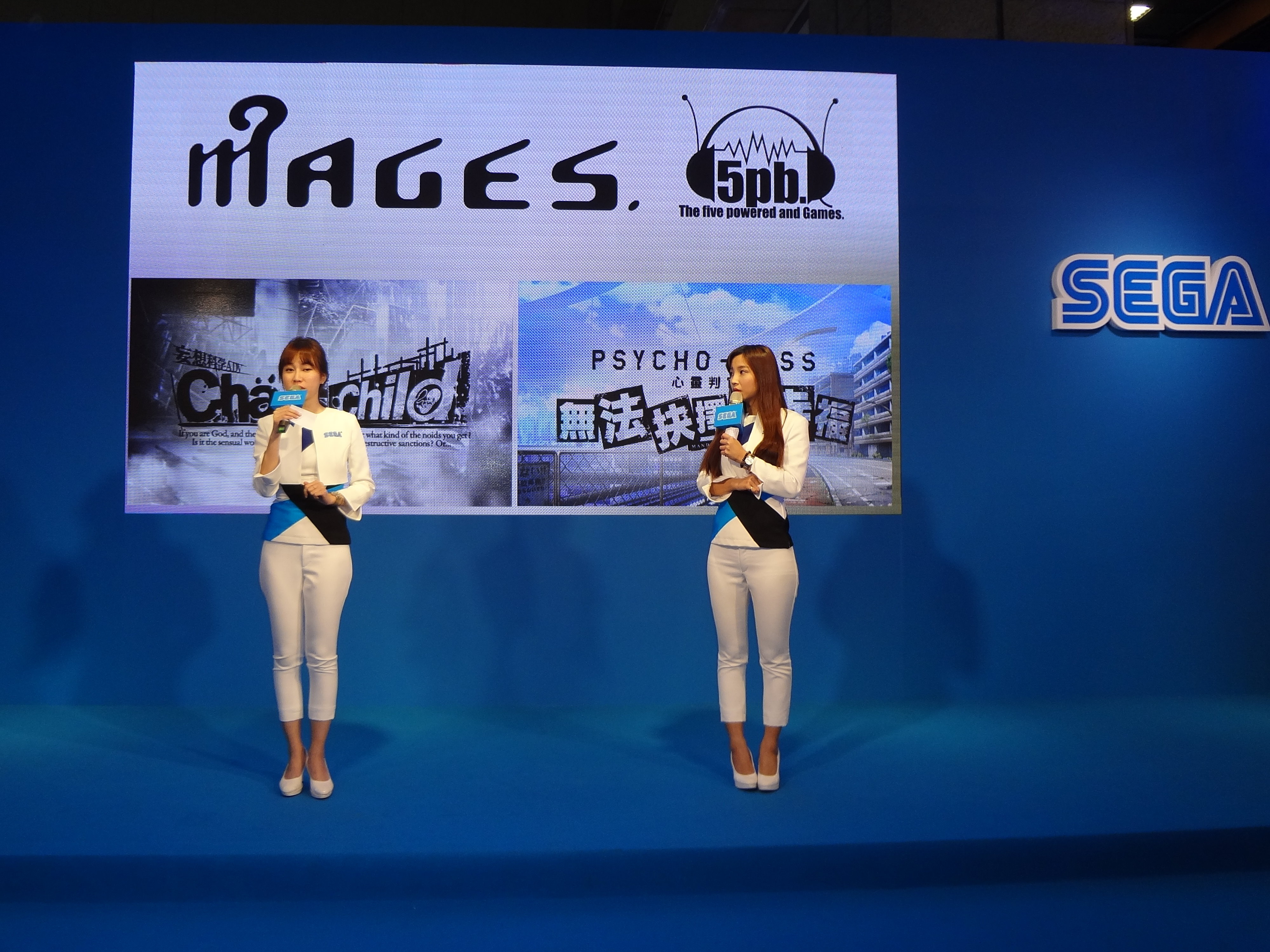
Promotion of the mobile version at the 2017 Taipei Game Show

Chaos;Child was originally planned to be released on November 27, 2014, in Japan for the Xbox One, but was delayed, and was released on December 18, 2014. It was later ported to the PlayStation 3, PlayStation 4 and PlayStation Vita, and released on June 25, 2015; additionally, a Microsoft Windows version was released on April 28, 2016, an iOS version on January 31, 2017, and an Android version on May 28, 2017. The PlayStation 4 and PlayStation Vita versions were published by PQube in Europe on October 13, 2017, and digitally in North America on October 17, with a physical North American release following on October 24; the Windows version was published internationally by Spike Chunsoft on January 22, 2019. Chaos;Head Noah / Chaos;Child Double Pack, which bundles Chaos;Child with Chaos;Head Noah, was released for the Nintendo Switch on February 24, 2022, in Japan.

A limited edition of the Japanese PlayStation 3, PlayStation 4 and PlayStation Vita versions was made available, which includes a drama CD and a "present box" paper craft. The Western console release was also made available in a "Gigalomaniac Edition", which includes an artbook, a soundtrack and a set of pin badges.

== Reception ==
Reception

Aggregate score
Aggregator	Score
Metacritic	PS4: 76/100

Review score
Publication	Score
Famitsu	8/10, 8/10, 8/10, 7/10

Chaos;Child was generally well received by critics, according to the review aggregator Metacritic. Richard Eisenbeis at Kotaku called the game excellent, and a good addition to the series. He enjoyed the story, calling the mystery "thrilling", and saying that the "disturbing and intriguing" murders were one of the best aspects of it. James Galizo of RPG Site also enjoyed this describing the visual novel as " one of the best in the genre", but did warn that due to the gruesome nature it wouldn't be for everybody. While Wes Playfair at NookGaming was also positive overall and recommended the visual novel, he noted that the amount of typos and typesetting errors was " staggering" for a professional release and felt Chaos;Child didn't live up to its predecessor overall.

Richard Eisenbeis at Kotaku enjoyed the game's characters, calling them deep and layered, and said that watching them try to outwit others' powers and using their own to the fullest was another highlight. He liked how the developers had gone "all in" when making the branch routes; the thing he liked the most about them was the consistency of the characters and their motivations between different routes. He found the game to be very long, however, taking him over 70 hours to play through, which he said could be a potential flaw.

=== Sales ===
The Xbox One and PlayStation 3 versions of the game were unable to reach the Japanese weekly sales charts upon launch; the PlayStation Vita and PlayStation 4 versions did, however, selling 10,325 and 4,860 copies, respectively, with the PlayStation Vita version being the ninth best selling game of the week. On the following week, the PlayStation 4 version had dropped off the chart, while the PlayStation Vita version dropped to seventeenth place with 2,556 additional copies sold. In the United Kingdom, Chaos;Child was the best selling PlayStation Vita game during its European debut week in October 2017, and charted until the end of May 2018; (Note: It temporarily dropped from the top-ten chart for one week each in February, March and May 2018.) the PlayStation 4 version did however not appear at all in the weekly top-twenty PlayStation 4 game sales chart for the region.

By October 2020, the game had only sold approximately 10% the amount of copies as Steins;Gate; this led to the development of Steins;???, a thematic sequel to Steins;Gate that relates to it similarly to how Chaos;Child relates to Chaos;Head.

== Related media ==
A manga adaption drawn by Relucy is published by Kadokawa in Dengeki G's Magazine; there is also a spin-off manga, Chaos;Child: Children's Collapse, which is drawn by Futsū Onshin and written by the Chaos;Child game's writer Eiji Umehara. It was published in Kodansha's magazine Monthly Shōnen Sirius starting in August 2016, and moved to Kodansha and Niconico's web magazine Suiyōbi no Sirius on September 27, 2017. An anime television adaptation of the game was produced by Silver Link, and began airing in January 2017. A spin-off game, Chaos;Child Love Chu Chu!!, was released in 2017. Additionally, Shikura said in 2016 that he wanted to make an erotic game based on Chaos;Child and Chaos;Head, targeted at adult players.
