= Zwei (band) =

Zwei (ヅヴァイ)
- Origin: Japan
- Instruments: Bass guitar
- Years active: 2003–2024
- Labels: VAP (2004–2007), Universal (2007–2010), 5pb. (2010–present)
- Website: http://zweima.com

Zwei (Kana: ヅヴァイ, Dzuvai) is a Japanese duo formed in 2003 composed of Megu on bass guitar and Ayumu on vocals. "zwei" (pronounced [t͡svaɪ̯]) is the German word for "two", referencing how they are a duo.

== Biography ==
Megu and Ayumu started their career as Zwei in 2004 under VAP, Inc. They released their debut single "Movie Star" in May 2004. Since then, the band started developing a techno-rock style with some similarities with Depeche Mode. In October 2004, they released their debut album Pretty Queen. The following year, they continued releasing singles, and a second album, but in general, the sales of both the albums and the singles was limited. Probably the most popular song of this era was "Dragon", released in July 2005.

In 2007, Zwei officially left VAP and signed on with Universal Music Group. However, in 2010, the band left Universal and moved to 5pb. They started singing songs for some of the video games developed by the same company. As a result, the popularity of the band started growing moderately. In 2012, they sang the opening theme for the visual novel Robotics;Notes, developed by 5pb. too. The band also sings the opening theme for the anime adaptation of Robotics;Notes. In 2012 Zwei also released music for When They Cry 4 / Umineko

In 2013, the duo announced they would be releasing their first album in 8 years, titled "Re:Set," on April 24.

Their song "Last Game" is used as the ending theme to the anime series Steins;Gate 0.

On May 26th, 2024 via their official website, the duo band Zwei has officially disbanded.

== Discography ==
=== Singles ===
- Movie Star (May 26, 2004)
- Watashigai no Uta (July 22, 2004)
- Hikari (March 23, 2005)
- Dragon (July 21, 2005)
- FAKE FACE/Shiroi Machi (November 16, 2005)
- 1+1=2 (June 20, 2007)
- Distance (June 2008)
- Koyubi no Paradox (August 4, 2010)
- Inanna no Mita Yume (January 15, 2012)
- Kakucho Place (June 27, 2012)
- Junjo Spectra (November 21, 2012)
- Heading For Tomorrow (July 24, 2013)
- Brave the Sky (feat. Kanako Itō) (April 30, 2014)
- Yakusoku no Augment (June 25, 2014)
- Lyra (November 25, 2015)
- Last Game (April 25, 2018)
- Avant Story (December 26, 2018)

=== Albums ===
- Pretty Queen (October 14, 2004)
- Z (Zeta) (December 21, 2005)
- Re:Set (April 24, 2013)
- NEO MASQUE (August 26, 2015)
- Ley Line (June 21, 2017)

=== DVD ===
- Zwei in the Box (February 22, 2006)
