= Memories Off: Yubikiri no Kioku =

2010 Japanese visual novel

- Developer(s): 5pb.
- Publisher(s): 5pb. (Note: Sweets Pack for the PlayStation Portable and PlayStation 3. Including a limited edition package called Memories Off: Yubikiri no Kioku (Genteiban) contains Memories Off: Yubikiri no Kioku (Vol.1) soundtrack, Memories Off: Yubikiri no Kioku (Vol.2) soundtrack and Audio drama CD.); Koei Tecmo (Windows); Softmax (Windows); Mages Inc. (iPhone)
- Director(s): Yūsuke Matsumoto
- Producer(s): Tarō Shibata
- Artist(s): Shizuki Morii
- Series: Memories Off
- Engine: Five Engine
- Platform(s): Xbox 360; PlayStation Portable iPhone; Microsoft Windows; PlayStation 3 PlayStation Vita
- Release: Xbox 360: JP: July 29, 2010; TW/HK: November 8, 2010; PlayStation Portable: JP: May 26, 2011; iPhone: WW: February 22, 2012; Sweets Pack: JP: May 26, 2011 (PSP); JP: June 27, 2013 (PS3); Memories Off: Yubikiri no Kioku (Genteiban): JP: June 27, 2013 (PS3); Windows: TW/HK: June 2, 2011; PlayStation 3, PlayStation Vita: JP: June 27, 2013
- Genre(s): Visual novel
- Mode(s): Single-player

Memories Off: Yubikiri no Kioku (メモリーズオフ ゆびきりの記憶, Memoriizu Ofu Yubikiri no Kioku) is a Japanese romance visual novel developed and published by 5pb. for the Xbox 360 and later ported to the PlayStation Portable, Microsoft Windows, PlayStation 3 and PlayStation Vita. It is the seventh game in the Memories Off series.

== Story ==
=== Setting ===
Yubikiri no Kioku takes place in a fictional city named Fujikawa located in the Kanagawa Prefecture.

=== Characters ===
The player takes on the role of Naoki Serizawa (芹澤直樹, Serizawa Naoki), the protagonist of Yubikiri no Kioku. Naoki used to live at Chinatsu's home but is now living alone. Naoki is a second-year student at the private Tōrin high school. Chinatsu Amakawa (天川 ちなつ, Amakawa Chinatsu; voiced by: Yui Kano) is also a second-year student at the private Tōrin high school and is a classmate of Naoki's. In addition, she's Naoki's cousin. As Chinatsu is concerned about Naoki at all times, she commutes to school with him and is always around him during school hours. Kasumi Nagumo (南雲 霞, Nagumo Kasumi; voiced by: Yū Kobayashi) is a runaway girl who suddenly arrived at the doorsteps of Naoki's place and is forcibly living with him at the moment. Orihime Hoshitsuki (星月 織姫, Hoshitsuki Orihime; voiced by: Ai Nonaka) is the new math teacher for Naoki's class at Tōrin high school. Lisa Caycy Foster (リサ ケイシ フォスター, Risa Keishi Fosutaa; voiced by: Kanako Sakai) is an American girl who has gone to Japan to study abroad temporarily. Lisa works part-time at a restaurant called Fūrūyan and is where she meets Naoki. Lisa's reason for studying in Japan is because of her interest in Japanese history and culture. Shiina Kodou (鼓堂 詩名, Kodō Shiina; voiced by: Saori Hayami) is a first-year student at Tōrin high school. She is very outgoing and loves gossip.

== Gameplay ==
A typical scene from Memories Off: Yubikiri no Kioku. Here the player is interacting with the character Lisa, whose dialogue is shown in the text box.

Much of the gameplay requires little interaction from the player as the majority of the time is spent reading the text that appears on the game's screen. The text being displayed represents the thoughts of the characters or the dialogue between them. The player is occasionally presented with choices to determine the direction of the game. Depending on what is chosen, the plot may progress in a specific direction.

== Development ==
Yubikiri no Kioku is the seventh entry in the Memories Off visual novel series. News of Yubikiri no Kioku was first announced by Famitsu on January 26, 2010, with the teaser site opening a few days later on January 29, 2010. Yubikiri no Kioku runs on the Five Engine, 5pb.'s visual novel engine for the Xbox 360.

The character designer for Yubikiri no Kioku is Shizuki Morii. Morii is a new character designer that has not worked on any previous Memories Off game. The director of the game is Yūsuke Matsumoto and Tarō Shibata is the producer.

=== Release history ===
The limited and regular editions of Yubikiri no Kioku for the Xbox 360 were released on July 29, 2010. A Chinese version of the game (Japanese audio with Chinese text) was subsequently released on November 8, 2010. The PSP version came with a limited edition called the "Sweets Pack" and was released on May 26, 2011. PC version was released in Taiwan on June 2, 2011.

PlayStation 3 and PlayStation Vita versions with new opening songs are released on June 27, 2013. These versions have cross-save functionality.
