= Chaos;Head Love Chu Chu! =

2010 video game

- Xbox 360 cover art, featuring (clockwise from top left) Rimi, Sena, Yua, Nanami, Kozue, and Ayase
- Developer(s): 5pb., Nitroplus
- Publisher(s): 5pb.
- Producer(s): Tatsuya Matsuhara
- Artist(s): Mutsumi Sasaki; Yukihiro Matsuo
- Writer(s): Naotaka Hayashi
- Composer(s): Takeshi Abo
- Series: Science Adventure
- Platform(s): Xbox 360, PlayStation 3, PlayStation Portable, PlayStation Vita
- Release: Xbox 360: JP: March 25, 2010; PlayStation Portable: JP: January 27, 2011; PlayStation 3: JP: November 22, 2012; PlayStation Vita: JP: August 21, 2014
- Genre(s): Visual novel
- Mode(s): Single-player

Chaos;Head Love Chu Chu! (Note: Chaos;Head Love Chu Chu! (Japanese: Chaos;Head らぶ Chu Chu!, Hepburn: Chaos;Head Rabu Chu Chu!)) is a romantic comedy visual novel video game developed by 5pb. and Nitroplus. It is part of the Science Adventure series, and is the direct sequel of the 2009 game Chaos;Head NoAH. It was released for Xbox 360 on March 25, 2010, and later released for PlayStation Portable, PlayStation 3 and PlayStation Vita.

== Synopsis ==
=== Characters ===
The player assumes the role of Takumi Nishijo, who used to be a loner; he is starting to become more social, but still finds it difficult to speak to girls. Among other characters is Takumi's classmate Rimi Sakihata. The game introduces a new character, Erin-Frey Orgel, who is Seira Orgel's little sister.

== Development ==
Chaos;Head Love Chu Chu! was the third collaborative work between 5pb. and Nitroplus after Chaos;Head and Steins;Gate. Character design was handled by Mutsumi Sasaki and the art of the game was provided by Yukihiro Matsuo. The scenario was written by Naotaka Hayashi and the producer was Tatsuya Matsuhara. Product design was done by Choco. According to Tatsuya, the project was conceived during the development of Steins;Gate. The Love Chu Chu! title was narrowed down from a list of about one hundred candidates. The game is described by the developers as an "exploding delusions ADV" (妄想爆裂ADV, Mōsō Bakuretsu ADV).

The opening theme, Synchro Shiyouyo (シンクロしようよ, Shinkuro Shiyouyo) was performed by DystopiaGround's Nao, with lyrics and music written by Chiyomaru Shikura. The ending themes were performed by Kanako Itō and Sakakibara Yui. The PlayStation Portable version uses the song "Let's Mount Some Flags/Tags" (フラグ立てようよ Furagu Tateyou Yo), also by Nao, as its opening theme.

== Promotion and release ==
An Internet radio show for promoting Chaos;Head Love Chu Chu! aired every Thursday starting on February 11, 2010. The show was hosted by Akane Tomonaga, the voice actress of Seira Orgel, and Emiri Katō, the voice actress of Erin-fray Orgel. The CD single for the game's opening theme was released on March 31, 2010. The PSP opening song, along with the original ending themes, were released on the CD single PSPソフト「CHAOS;HEAD らぶChu☆Chu!」主題歌.

Chaos;Head Love Chu Chu! was released on March 25, 2010 in both regular and limited editions. The limited edition of the game comes with a microfiber towel with an illustration by Mutsumi Sasaki and a special Dengeki G's Chaos;Head Festival! (電撃G's CHAOS;HEAD Festival!) magazine. The magazine includes a collection of visuals, interviews with the cast, the artists and Chiyomaru Shikura, and a short story written by Naotaka Hayashi. A PS3 version of Chaos;Head Love Chu Chu! was released on November 22, 2012 along with Chaos;Head Noah. A PlayStation Vita edition titled Chaos;Head Dual, featuring both Chaos;Head Noah and Chaos;Head Love Chu Chu!, was released on August 21, 2014.

== Reception ==
During its opening week, the PSP version of Love Chu Chu! was the fifteenth best selling game in Japan, with 10,753 copies sold.
