= Mutsumi Sasaki =

Japanese freelance anime/manga artist

Mutsumi Sasaki (ささき むつみ, Sasaki Mutsumi; born February 17) is a Japanese freelance anime/manga artist from Hokkaidō, Japan. He mainly provides character designs for bishōjo characters.

== Works ==
Character design

- Happy Lesson
- Futakoi
- Memories Off
- Memories Off 2nd
- Myself ; Yourself
- Chaos;Head
- Chaos;Head Love Chu Chu!
- Majika Majika
- L@ve Once
- Chaos;Child
- Chaos;Child Love Chu Chu!!

Illustration

- Aquarian Age
- Aquarian Age Alternative
- Character Net Ai$Tantei no Jiken Bo
- Futakoi Alternative
- Misuteri Aru Character Net

Other

- Yogurting
