= Robotics;Notes =

2012 video game

- Robotics;Notes Elite cover art
- Developer: 5pb.
- Publishers: JP: 5pb.; WW: Spike Chunsoft; EU: Numskull Games
- Director: Toshihiko Kajioka
- Producer: Tatsuya Matsubara
- Artists: Tomonori Fukuda; Makoto Ishiwata (Mecha)
- Writers: Chiyomaru Shikura; Naotaka Hayashi
- Composer: Takeshi Abo
- Series: Science Adventure
- Platforms: Microsoft Windows, Nintendo Switch, PlayStation 3, PlayStation 4, PlayStation Vita, Xbox 360
- Release: PlayStation 3, Xbox 360: JP: June 28, 2012; PlayStation Vita: JP: June 26, 2014; Switch, PS4: JP: January 31, 2019; NA: October 13, 2020; EU: October 16, 2020; Microsoft Windows: WW: October 13, 2020
- Genre: Visual novel
- Mode: Single-player

Robotics;Notes is a visual novel video game developed by 5pb. It is the third main game in the Science Adventure series, following Chaos;Head and Steins;Gate, and is described by the developers as an "Augmented Science Adventure". The game was originally released by 5pb. in Japan on the PlayStation 3 and Xbox 360 in 2012; the enhanced version Robotics;Notes Elite was released for PlayStation Vita in 2014, and for Nintendo Switch and PlayStation 4 in 2019. An English version of Robotics;Notes Elite was released by Spike Chunsoft in 2020 for Microsoft Windows, Nintendo Switch and PlayStation 4.

Six manga have been produced, and an anime adaptation by Production I.G aired in Fuji TV's Noitamina slot between October 2012 and March 2013. The anime has been licensed by Funimation in North America. Robotics;Notes DaSH, a sequel to the game, was released in 2019.

== Gameplay ==
Robotics;Notes is a science fiction visual novel in which the player follows the perspective of multiple characters, mainly Kaito Yashio. Its gameplay requires little player interaction as much of the game's duration is spent on reading the text that appears on the screen, which represents the story's narrative and dialogue. The text is accompanied by 3D animated character models, which represent whom Kaito or Akiho is talking to, and background art. Throughout the game, the player encounters CG artwork at certain points in the story, which take the place of the background art and character models. Unlike the previous entries in the Science Adventure series, Robotics;Notes follows an almost entirely linear narrative, consisting of twelve chapters referred to as 'phases'. Depending on the decisions made at certain points during the game, the player can choose to skip some phases entirely.

Throughout the narrative sequences in which the player follows Kaito, the player may activate the PokeCom Trigger (ポケコントリガー, Pokekon Torigā), which replaces Steins;Gate's Phone Trigger system and allows the player to use the applications installed on Kaito's tablet computer. These applications include Deluoode Map, a map application; Twipo (ツイぽ, Tsuipo), a Twitter-like social networking application, which the player may use to reply to other characters' tweets with predetermined responses; and Iru-o (居る夫。, Iruo.), an augmented reality image recognition application which the player may use to examine the environment and information tagged on characters or objects.

== Plot ==
=== Setting and themes ===
Robotics;Notes is set in 2019 on Tanegashima, an island to the south of Kyūshū in southern Japan. The game's theme is robots and the question "What would happen if you really tried to make a giant robot?"

=== Story ===
In Robotics;Notes, the player assumes the role of Kaito Yashio, someone who enjoys fighting games. He is in his school's robot club along with his childhood friend Akiho Senomiya. The story begins when Akiho decides to build a robot based on the Gunvarrel animated series she is a fan of, and she recruits Kaito to aid her. With the robot club short on members and on the verge of closure, Kaito heads out to try and recruit more members, eventually securing the support of professional robot battler Subaru Hidaka, karate practitioner Junna Daitoku, and the world renowned programmer Frau Kojiro. Together, they begin the process of building their replica of the titular Gunvarrel, the Gunbuild-1. However, reality quickly sets in when they realize the physical impossibility of completely replicating Gunvarrel, and are forced to make many design compromises. In addition to the relatively primitive Gunbuild-1, they also manage to build the more advanced Gunbuild-2. They also take advantage of the Iru-O system to change both Gunbuilds' appearances via augmented reality.

As Gunbuild-1 is being developed, Kaito also comes across the "Kimijima Reports", authored by the deceased scientist Kō Kimijima who claims an impending solar flare will wipe out all life on Earth. Kaito also encounters two AI personalities that inhabit Iru-O, Airi and Sister Centipede, who help him track down the other reports. Kaito follows the instructions in the reports in an effort to avert the solar flare, and in the process wakes up Airi Yukifune, the girl the AI Airi is based on, who was put into suspended animation due to a then incurable illness. However, Kaito discovers too late that the reports were a lie, and that it is Kimijima himself, now an AI living within the Iru-O system, attempting to trigger a solar flare on the behalf of the Committee of 300 in plan dubbed "Project Atum".

Moving on to the next stage of his plans, Kimijima deletes Airi and seizes control of Akiho's older sister Misaki, stealing an experimental battle robot called SUMERAGI and destroying the Gunbuild-2. Meanwhile, the Committee of 300 orchestrates mass robot rebellions all over Japan, plunging the country into chaos while a commando team seizes the Tanegashima Space Center with the help of SUMERAGI. The robotics club is then approached by Nae Tennouji and Toshiyuki Sawada, who reveal they are part of a secret group that resists against the Committee of 300, and that the Committee plans to use Tanegashima to launch a rocket containing bombs that will create an apocalyptic solar flare that will wipe out the majority of humanity, allowing the Committee to rule over the survivors and rebuild the world according to their will. Sawara provides the robotics club with a special code that can completely delete Kimijima, but requires them to be in close range to send it. Working together with the other Tanegashima residents, the robotics club upgrades Gunbuild-1 into the Super Gunbuild-1 and Kaito pilots it against SUMERAGI while Nae neutralizes the commandos. Kaito is able to force Misaki to exit her cockpit, leaving Kimijima vulnerable and allowing Kaito to delete him, though Kimijima boasts that another copy of himself will surely surface.

With Kimijima gone, Nae is able to abort the rocket launch and thwart the Committee's plan. The robotics club is then greeted by the Tanegashima residents who celebrate them as heroes.

=== Characters ===
Kaito Yashio (八汐 海翔, Yashio Kaito)
Voiced by: Ryohei Kimura (Japanese); Clifford Chapin (English)
Kaito is the male protagonist who constantly plays the fighting game Kill-Ballad and is a member of his school's robotics club. After the MF Anemone Incident he suffers from spasms in which time seems to be moving extremely slow for him. He is not interested in robots, and is only a member of the club to be by Akiho's side, as Misaki left her to him before she left the island.
Akiho Senomiya (瀬乃宮 あき穂, Senomiya Akiho)
Voiced by: Yoshino Nanjō (Japanese); Lindsay Seidel (English)
Akiho is the main heroine and the only other member and chairman of the robotics club at the beginning. She is Kaito's childhood best friend. After the MF Anemone Incident she suffers from spasms in which time seems to be moving extremely fast for her. Her dream is to complete the giant robot Gunbuild-1 started by her older sister Misaki.
Subaru Hidaka (日高 昴, Hidaka Subaru) / Mr. Pleiades (ミスター・プレアデス, Misutā Pureadesu)
Voiced by: Yoshimasa Hosoya (Japanese); Jarrod Greene (English)
A second-year student in the same school as Kaito and Akiho. He won the Robo-One championship several years ago and as a result Akiho tries to get him to join the robotics club, but he refuses because his father got him to promise he'd stop playing with robots in high school and become a fisherman after graduating. Kaito blackmails him into joining the club with Mr. Pleiades' identity.
Frau Koujiro (神代 フラウ, Kōjiro Furau) / Kona Furugōri (古郡 こな, Furugōri Kona)
Voiced by: Kaori Nazuka (Japanese); Leah Clark (English)
Creator of Kill-Ballad and daughter of director of Gunvarrel. It is revealed that Gunvarrel was a propaganda tool being used to brainwash the masses, and when the staff of Gunvarrel discovered this they were killed by the Committee of 300. All that Frau knows is that her mother went missing and was last seen in Tanegashima, and comes to the island in search of clues.
Junna Daitoku (大徳 淳和, Daitoku Junna)
Voiced by: Sora Tokui (Japanese); Monica Rial (English)
One of the members of the Robotics Club and a former karate club member. She developed robophobia at a young age after a robot fell on top of her.
Airi Yukifune (行舟 愛理, Yukifune Airi)
Voiced by: Rie Kugimiya (Japanese); Apphia Yu (English)
An AI existing within Iru-O created by Kimijima, with another personality (Sister Centipede) that is used by him to collect information. She subconsciously spies on Kaito for Kimijima. She was originally a girl with an incurable illness whose body was put into deep sleep in hopes that she could be cured with future medical technology. When the Iru-O servers are rebooted on Christmas Airi's personality is erased and Sister Centipede returns to Kimijima's side.
Misaki Senomiya (瀬乃宮 みさ希, Senomiya Misaki)
Voiced by: Kikuko Inoue (Japanese); Caitlin Glass (English)
Akiho's sister. During the MF Anemone Incident she discovered what Kimijima was doing and killed him, but ever since has been brainwashed by his cyber-ghost.
Mizuka Irei (伊禮 瑞榎, Irei Mizuka)
Voiced by: Takako Honda (Japanese); Lydia Mackay (English)
Misaki's best friend. After Kimijima was killed she discovered the body and hid it, which resulted in Misaki not being blamed for the murder. She dies when her HUG is driven berserk by the Committee of 300 and she falls off a cliff.
Mitsuhiko Nagafukada (長深田 充彦, Nagafukada Mitsuhiko)
Voiced by: Yōji Ueda (Japanese); Robert McCollum (English)
Childhood friend of Misaki and Mizuka, and the teacher in charge of the robotics club.
Kaoruko Usui (臼井 薫子, Usui Kaoruko)
Voiced by: Toshiko Sawada (Japanese); Linda Leonard (English)
The head teacher of Kaito's school.
Tetsuharu Fujita (藤田 鉄治, Fujita Tetsuharu)
Voiced by: Nobuaki Fukuda (Japanese); R Bruce Elliott (English)
Also known by the name "Doc". Owner of the shop "Robo Clinic" which deals in robot parts. Junna's grandfather. He creates most of the important components used in the Robot Club's creations.
Kō Kimijima (君島 コウ, Kimijima Kō)
Voiced by: Toshiyuki Morikawa (Japanese); Eric Vale (English)
The author of the Kimijima Reports, who died several years ago. It turns out that he works for the Committee of 300 and caused the MF Anemone incident which was in fact an experiment that would have killed all the test subjects; This was stopped by Misaki who killed him. However before his death he uploaded his consciousness to the internet and lives on through Iru-o, and now plans to execute the Committee's plans by inducing a massive solar flare that will kill the majority of the population of Earth. He uses the Kimijima Reports to manipulate people, and he has Sister Centipede and Misaki (who was brainwashed by him) do his bidding in the virtual and real worlds respectively. In the end he is defeated by Kai using a virus created to destroy him by Daru.
Ken'ichirō Senomiya (瀬乃宮 健一郎, Senomiya Ken'ichirō)
Voiced by: Takehiro Koyama (Japanese); Bradley Campbell (English)
Akiho and Misaki's father and head of the local branch of JAXA.
Sumio Nagafukada (長深田 澄夫, Nagafukada Sumio)
Voiced by: Tetsuo Kanao (Japanese); David Wald (English)
Mitsuhiko's uncle and president of Space Candy company. He funds the Gunbuild projects in exchange for publicity (the company name displayed on the robots).
Hiromu Hidaka (日高 宏武, Hidaka Hiromu)
Voiced by: Hiroyuki Kinoshita (Japanese); Bill Jenkins (English)
Subaru's father. Opposes his son's interest in robots and wants him to join him as a fisherman after graduation from high school.
Toshiyuki Sawada (澤田 敏行, Sawada Toshiyuki)
Voiced by: Shinichiro Miki (Japanese); Chuck Huber (English)
A son of a member of the Committee of 300, who actually works against them and has founded a secret organization which includes the characters of Steins;Gate and Chaos;Head to resist them.
Nae Tennouji (天王寺 綯, Tennouji Nae)
Voiced by: Ayano Yamamoto (Japanese); Brina Palencia (English)
A returning character from Steins;Gate who is now 20 and works for JAXA.
DaSH
Itaru Hashida, a returning character from Steins;Gate. Like Nae as well as the other Steins;Gate and Chaos;Head characters, he now works for Sawada's secret organization. When it is revealed that Iru-o cannot be trusted as it was created by Kimijima, he creates a replacement, "DG297 3rd Edition ver.4.11". He also creates the virus which defeats Kimijima. He does not have any speaking roles, however, and is only mentioned in passing. As of 2019, he has already married Yuki Amane and had their daughter, Suzuha. "DaSH" is read "Daru the Super Hacker", but he temporarily calls himself "DaSP" ("Daru the Super Programmer") in the final chapter.

== Development and release ==
The planning and original concept and basic story of Robotics;Notes was headed by Shikura. Naotaka Hayashi is the scenario writer for the game and Tatsuya Matsubara the producer. The character designs are done by Tomonori Fukuda and the mechanical designs are done by Makoto Ishiwata. The composer of the game is Takeshi Abo. Shikura had been working on the game as early as July 2010. The team received development support from the Japan Aerospace Exploration Agency, and according to Shikura, this allowed the game's sciences and themes to better reflect reality. Nitroplus also provided assistance with the game. Robotics;Notes features 3D visuals, and the development team were aiming for high quality 3D models like Catherine and Idolmaster 2. The game is described by the developers as an "Augmented Science Adventure" (拡張科学アドベンチャー, Kakuchō Kagaku Adobenchā).

Robotics;Notes was announced through 5pb.'s official website on December 22, 2010, noting that details about the game would appear in the interview with Chiyomaru Shikura, the CEO of 5pb., featured in the issue of Famitsu magazine that was being sold on the same day. Robotics;Notes is the third entry in the Science Adventure series following the release of Chaos;Head in 2008 and Steins;Gate in 2009. When the target platform for the game had not yet been announced, Shikura had said that they were not going to let down the fans who have supported their past works in the Science Adventure series. He also stated that said they were aiming for a release some time in 2011. The game was released for both the PlayStation 3 and Xbox 360 on June 28, 2012. The PlayStation 3 version allows support for Remote Play with the PlayStation Vita. A PlayStation Vita port was released on June 26, 2014, under the title Robotics;Notes Elite, adding new features and animated scenes. Characters in the enhanced version were remodeled, and new animated video scenes were added. A Nintendo Switch version of Robotics;Notes Elite was announced by Shikura through a live stream in 2018; both it and a PlayStation 4 version were released on January 31, 2019, as Robotics;Notes Elite HD in a double pack with the sequel Robotics;Notes DaSH.

In 2018, Shikura said that a Western release of the game was under consideration; English versions of Elite and DaSH were announced by Spike Chunsoft at Anime Expo 2019, and were released worldwide for Microsoft Windows on October 13, 2020. The PlayStation 4 and Nintendo Switch versions were released in a bundle, on the same day in North America and on October 16 in Europe.

== Reception ==
Reception

Aggregate score
Aggregator	Score
Metacritic	PC: 82/100

Famitsu gave the PlayStation Vita port Robotics;Notes Elite a review score of 30/40. Japanese pre-orders for the original release of the game were over 80,000, a large increase over the preorders for Steins;Gate, the previous game in the series. Neither Famitsu nor Media Create revealed sales numbers for the DaSH and Elite HD bundles for PlayStation 4 and Nintendo Switch as part of their weekly sales charts, although Media Create listed both as ranking higher than the Nintendo Switch stand-alone version of DaSH, which sold 2,834 physical copies. Martin from the English Science Adventure news site Kiri Kiri Basara rated Robotics;Notes Elite an 8/10 for its "nearly flawless" story, but noted poor structure and various localization and technical issues in the English release, recommending a fan patch to improve the experience on the Windows release.

== Related media ==
- Robotics;Notes
- Anime television series
- Directed by: Kazuya Nomura
- Produced by: Makoto Kimura; George Wada; Takamitsu Inoue
- Written by: Jukki Hanada
- Music by: Takeshi Abo; Yuki Hayashi; Asami Tachibana
- Studio: Production I.G
- Licensed by: AUS: Madman Entertainment; NA: Crunchyroll; UK: Manga Entertainment
- Original network: Fuji TV (Noitamina)
- English network: US: Crunchyroll Channel
- Original run: October 12, 2012 – March 22, 2013
- Episodes: 22

=== Manga ===
A manga adaptation, titled Robotics;Notes and illustrated by Keiji Asakawa, was serialized Mag Garden's Monthly Comic Blade magazine between the March 2012 and September 2014 issues. The series was collected in six tankōbon volumes, released between July 10, 2012 and September 10, 2014. A second manga, titled Robotics;Notes Phantom Snow and illustrated by Gō, began serialization in Enterbrain's Famitsu Comic Clear online magazine on July 26, 2012. As of September 14, 2013, there have been two tankōbon volumes of it released. A third manga, titled Robotics;Notes Revival Legacy and illustrated by Tatsuya Shihara, began serialization in the September 2012 issue of Shueisha's Ultra Jump magazine. The series has also been compiled into three tankōbon volumes released between December 19, 2012, and January 17, 2014.

A fourth manga, titled Robotics;Notes Dream Seeker (Note: Robotics;Notes Dream Seeker (ROBOTICS;NOTES ドリームシーカー)) and illustrated by Tsuzuri Yuno, began serialization in the October 2012 issue of Square Enix's Monthly Shōnen Gangan magazine. Its first volume was released on September 21, 2013. A fifth manga, titled Robotics;Notes Side Junna: Chiisana Natsu no Monogatari (Note: Robotics;Notes Side Junna: Chiisana Natsu no Monogatari (ROBOTICS;NOTES side Junna：小さな夏のものがたり)) and illustrated by artist NB, began serialization in the November 2012 issue of Kadokawa Shoten's Shōnen Ace magazine. The first volume of Side Junna was released on November 26, 2012, and a second one, on April 25, 2013. A sixth manga, titled Robotics; Notes Pleiades Ambition and illustrated by Tokumo Sora, began serialization in the November 2012 issue of Media Factory's Monthly Comic Alive magazine. As of July 27, 2013, there have been three tankōbon volumes of it released.

=== Anime ===
An anime television series, produced by Production I.G, aired in Fuji TV's Noitamina slot between October 11, 2012, and March 21, 2013. The opening theme for episodes 1 to 11 is "Junjō Spectra" (Note: "Junjō Spectra" (純情スペクトラ, Junjō Supekutora; Naive Spectra)) by Zwei and the ending theme is "Umikaze no Brave" (Note: "Umikaze no Brave" (海風のブレイブ, Umikaze no Bureibu; The Ocean Breeze's Brave)) by Fumika. For episode 12 onwards the opening theme is "Hōkyō no Messiah" (Note: "Hōkyō no Messiah" (咆筺のメシア, Hōkyō no Meshia; Law of Messiah)) by Haruki and the ending theme is "Topology" (Note: "Topology" (トポロジー, Toporojī)) by Kanako Itō. Funimation has licensed the anime for streaming on their website starting October 12, 2012.

=== Sequel ===
A sequel to the game, Robotics;Notes DaSH, was developed by 5pb. and Chiyomaru Studio, and was released in Japan on January 31, 2019, for the PlayStation 4 and Nintendo Switch. It was written by Chiyomaru Shikura and produced by Tatsuya Matsubara, with character designs by Tomonori Fukuda.
