= Chaos;Head =

2008 video game

- Windows cover art, depicting Rimi Sakihata
- Developers: 5pb., Nitroplus
- Publishers: JP: Nitroplus; JP: 5pb. (Noah); WW: Spike Chunsoft
- Director: Tatsuya Matsubara
- Producers: Chiyomaru Shikura; Digitarou
- Artists: Sasaki Mutsumi; Matsuo Yukihiro
- Writers: Chiyomaru Shikura; Hayashi Naotaka; Ogami Keichi
- Composers: Takeshi Abo; Chiyomaru Shikura; 5zizz; Isoe Toshimichi; Syntarou Jimbo; Ooyama You
- Series: Science Adventure
- Platforms: Windows, Xbox 360, PlayStation 3, PlayStation Portable, PlayStation Vita, iOS, Android, Nintendo Switch
- Release: April 25, 2008: Windows; JP: April 25, 2008; WW: October 7, 2022 Xbox 360; JP: February 26, 2009 PlayStation Portable; JP: June 24, 2010 iOS; JP: November 18, 2010 Android; JP: January 24, 2012 PlayStation 3; JP: November 22, 2012 PlayStation Vita; JP: August 21, 2014 Nintendo Switch; JP: February 24, 2022; WW: October 7, 2022
- Genre: Visual novel
- Mode: Single-player

Chaos;Head (stylized in all capitals) is a 2008 science fiction visual novel video game developed by 5pb. and Nitroplus. It is the first game in the Science Adventure series. An enhanced version titled Chaos;Head Noah was released for Xbox 360 in 2009, and has since been ported to multiple platforms. An English localization was released by Spike Chunsoft for Nintendo Switch and Windows in 2022. The game follows Takumi Nishijou, who gets involved in the "New Gen" serial murder case. He frequently experiences delusions and hallucinations, some of which the player can influence, which affects the progression of the story.

The game was planned by Chiyomaru Shikura and written by Hayashi Naotaka, and features character designs by Sasaki Mutsumi and music by Takeshi Abo, who described the game's sound as "rainy". The game was commercially successful, helping 5pb. establish itself as a game developer, and was well received for its story. In addition to the direct sequel Chaos;Head Love Chu Chu! and the thematic sequel Chaos;Child, manga, an anime series, and an internet radio show based on Chaos;Head have been produced.

== Gameplay ==
Takumi having a conversation with Kozue. The delusional trigger system is displayed in the top left and right.

Chaos;Head is a visual novel game in which the player takes the role of Takumi Nishijou, an otaku and shut-in, who experiences delusions. The game is mostly linear, but frequently includes player choices: the player is able to choose whether the hallucinations Takumi experiences should be positive or negative, or if he should manage to stay grounded in reality. Positive delusions generally involve comical or erotic scenes, while negative ones include horror elements and violence. The player chooses the delusions through the "delusional trigger" system, wherein green and red lights are displayed on the top of the screen, representing positive and negative delusions.

After the player has played through the game once, delusions chosen during subsequent playthroughs determine which of three endings they will reach. When the player replays the game, they are able to fast-forward past passages of text they have already read. In the updated re-release Chaos;Head Noah, further endings are possible to reach, also by choosing what delusions to experience. The player can read about key vocabulary used in the game, including internet slang, through the "TIPS" glossary, which is updated with new items as the player encounters them in the dialogue.

== Plot ==
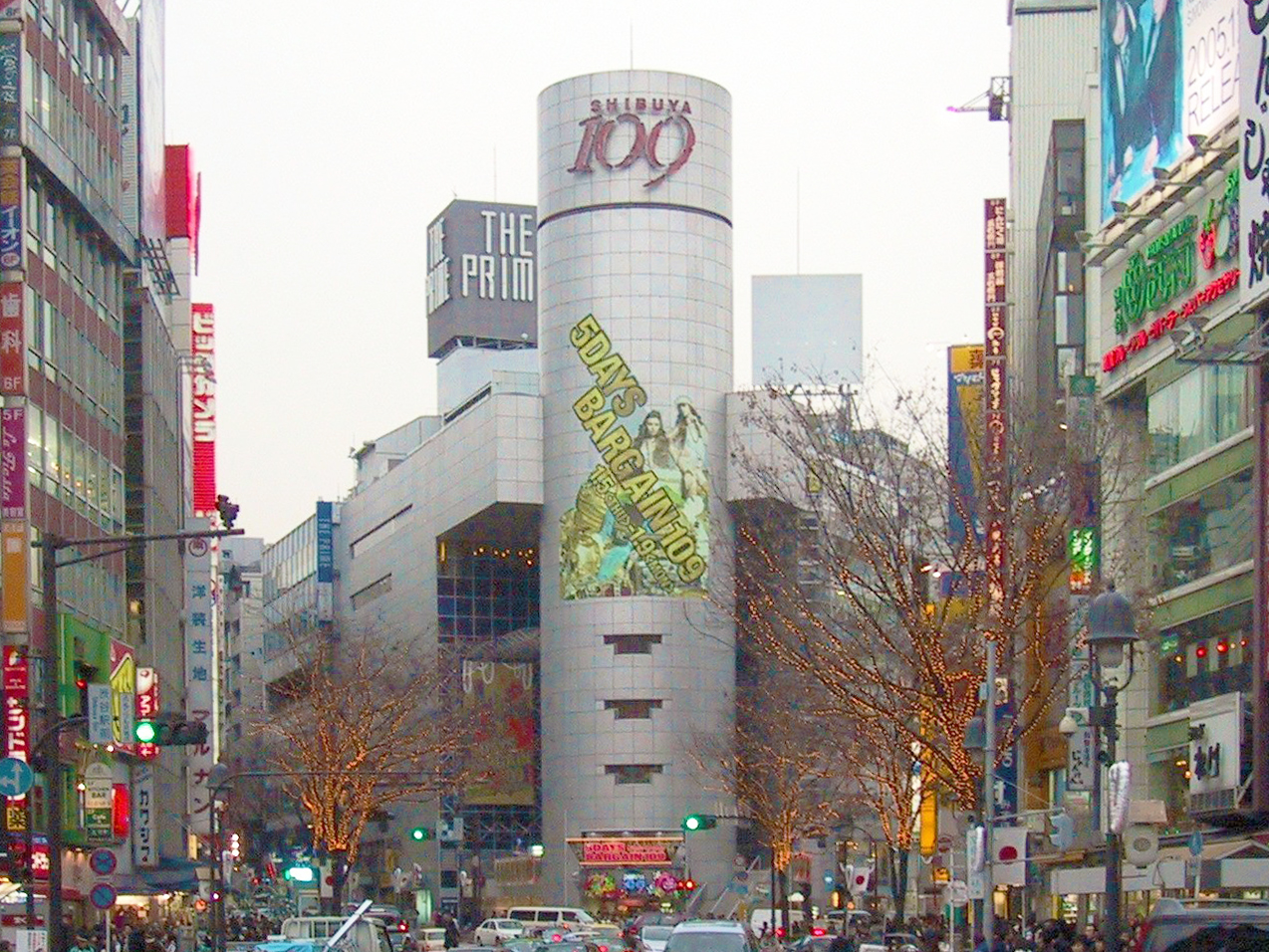
Chaos;Head is set in Shibuya, Tokyo.

The game is set in 2009 in the Shibuya district of Tokyo, where Takumi lives in a cargo crate on top of an apartment building. He discusses the recent "New Generation Madness" ("New Gen") serial murder case in Shibuya with his friend Grim over the internet, when someone with the username "Shogun" sends Takumi image files depicting a man pinned to a wall with stakes. Later, Takumi witnesses a girl he does not recognize committing the murder portrayed in the image files, and he flees the murder scene. A few days later, she sits next to him in school. He thinks she will kill him, but is told that they supposedly have been friends for a year and that her name is Rimi Sakihata.

Convinced that Shogun is targeting him, Takumi tries to avoid getting involved in the murder case, which draws the attention of the police. As he becomes a suspect and more murders occur, Takumi worries that Shogun is targeting him and experiences paranoia and hallucinations, and becomes unsure of what is real and who he can trust. In one of his delusions, Shogun appears as an old man in a wheelchair and tells him that more people will die unless he awakens.

When Takumi sees a girl carrying a large sword in public and notices that only he can see it, Ayase Kishimoto – a student who recently transferred to Takumi's school – tells him that he needs a "DI-sword" to be saved. She makes such a sword materialize in her hands, and tells him about how Takumi, the girl carrying the sword – Sena Aoi – and her friend Kozue Orihara are Gigalomaniacs: people with the ability to project delusions into reality, which is called "real-booting".

The Nozomi Group, a technology company in Shibuya, is revealed to be using their Noah II machine to synthetically use Gigalomaniac power, and have staff carrying transmitters to increase Noah II's signal reach.

Takumi learns that he himself is a projected delusion with fabricated memories: a copy created by Shogun, who is the original Takumi. His sister Nanami is held in the location of the real Noah II, where she is made to awaken as a Gigalomaniac and obtain a DI-sword. Rimi – also a Gigalomaniac – tries to save her, but is attacked by Norose and taken prisoner in Nanami's stead. Shogun again meets with Takumi to tell him that he had intended to stop Nozomi from taking over humanity with Noah II, but that his body – aged from disease and overuse of Gigalomaniac powers – hindered him, prompting him to create Takumi to do it in his stead. Takumi obtains a DI-sword, and destroys the transmitters, revealing the nurse Hazuki to be the New Gen killer in the process by reading her memories and projecting them onto the screens on the buildings. She stabs and kills herself with a scalpel, after which an earthquake occurs, destroying much of Shibuya; Takumi rescues the other Gigalomaniacs from the destruction. While doing so, he is attacked by Mamoru Suwa, who pins Takumi to the wall with the same stakes used in the New Gen murder he witnessed. While on the verge of death, Takumi switches places with Suwa by projecting a delusion and "real-booting" it. He then continues to the location of Noah II. He fights Norose, but Noah II overwhelms him with delusions; he reaffirms his existence with the help of the other Gigalomaniacs' delusion synchronization, and destroys Norose and Noah II with his DI-sword. Lying in the ruins of Shibuya, depending on what the player chooses during the synchronization, he either gives up his life along with the dying Shogun's (in the "A" route), or stays alive with Rimi (the "AA" route). In Chaos;Head Noah, players are locked onto the "Silent Sky" route the first time they play the game – similar to the original's "A" route – and it also features additional routes dedicated to the female main cast. All of these routes must be completed in order to unlock the "Blue Sky" route, which is similar to the original's "AA" route.

== Development and release ==
Chaos;Head was developed in a collaboration between 5pb. and Nitroplus, who describe it as a "delusional science novel" (妄想科学NVL, Mōsō Kagaku NVL). It was planned by Chiyomaru Shikura, the founder and executive director of 5pb., and was written by Naotaka Hayashi, with character designs by Mutsumi Sasaki and concept art by Yukihiro Matsuo. Shikura intended to make the story based on reality to make it more relatable, saying that he personally finds it difficult to get excited for fantasy stories.

The game's music was composed by Takeshi Abo, Toshimichi Isoe, Yoh Oyama, and Shintaro Jimbo, with Abo composing 21 of the songs. While it was common for games in the genre to have music that is played in several scenes, Abo had to compose several songs that specifically matched certain individual scenes that were intended to be shocking and dark. He described the main image for the game's sound as "rainy", compared to the later Science Adventure games Steins;Gate, Robotics;Notes and Chaos;Child, which he called "cloudy", "clear weather" and "stormy", respectively. In preparation for composing the music, Abo read the game's story to understand the setting and the character personalities as much as possible. He wrote down his first impressions of the game's emotional flow and of the events and situations throughout the story, and used them to create a musical worldview for the game. He said that this approach takes more time than it would to just designate songs to the different areas in the game, but that it made it possible to create better songs with a greater relationship to the game's worldview. Chaos;Head was originally announced under the title Gigalomaniacs (ギガロマニアックス, Gigaromaniakkusu), and was released for Microsoft Windows on April 25, 2008, by Nitroplus. Around June 2008, the developers decided to port the game to Xbox 360 with added content: this version was released on February 26, 2009, as Chaos;Head Noah. Chaos;Head Noah was ported to multiple platforms, including PlayStation Portable on June 24, 2010, iOS on November 18, 2010, Android on January 24, 2012, and PlayStation 3 on November 22, 2012. While the Xbox 360 version was rated Z (18 years and up) by CERO, the PlayStation Portable and PlayStation 3 versions were edited to be able to be released with a D rating (17 years and up). The PlayStation Vita version bundled the Z-rated version with the follow-up game Chaos;Head Love Chu Chu! under the title Chaos;Head Dual, and was released on August 21, 2014. Another bundle, Chaos;Head Noah / Chaos;Child Double Pack collects Noah and Chaos;Child, and was released for the Nintendo Switch on February 24, 2022, with high-definition graphics.

In 2018, Shikura responded to fan requests on Twitter, saying that Chaos;Head Noah "probably" would be released in English, and in February 2022, Mages asked people to wait for information on an English release. An English localization of the double pack by Spike Chunsoft was eventually announced in March 2022, and was released on October 7, 2022. In July 2022, Spike Chunsoft announced that the standalone version of Noah would be available on Windows via Steam on the same date. However, edits found within Steam Database in August 2022 led to rumors about Chaos;Head being preemptively banned from the platform. The release was initially cancelled on September 30, citing Steam's guidelines requiring changes to the game's content; but on October 6, Spike Chunsoft announced that Valve had reversed their decision, allowing Noah to be released on the platform as originally planned.

== Reception ==
Reception

Aggregate score
Aggregator	Score
Metacritic	NS: 68/100

Review scores
Publication	Score
Nintendo Life	8/10
Nintendo World Report	5/10

Chaos;Head Noah received "mixed or average" reviews according to review aggregator Metacritic.

The game was a commercial success, and, together with Steins;Gate, helped establish 5pb. as a game developer. One month before the game's original April 2008 release, Chaos;Head was the fourth most pre-ordered PC game in Japan. It debuted as the third highest-selling PC game of April 2008 in Japan; it became the sixteenth highest-selling visual novel game on the video game store Getchu.com during the first half of 2008, and thirty-fifth overall for the year. Chaos;Head Noah was the eleventh best selling video game of the week in Japan during its debut week, with 18,000 copies sold.

Writing for Kotaku, Richard Eisenbeis found Takumi very unlikable, to the point of being unsure whether the player is meant to sympathize with him. He also noted that the game was short compared to the later Science Adventure games, and that the main characters never come together as a group and are not a vital part of Takumi's life, with Takumi instead "wandering in and out of their stories". Despite this, he found the plot and world gripping, and said that the game was not bad, but that it "might as well be nothing" compared to Steins;Gate. Kowachi from Dengeki Online recommended Chaos;Head Dual for having characters rich in personality and a unique protagonist, and praised how Takumi grew as a character throughout the story. Jenni Lada at TechnologyTell recommended the game, calling it an interesting and mature story, and called its lack of an English release unfortunate. Game Informer included Chaos;Head on a list of games they wanted to see localized; they considered an English version likely due to Steins;Gate's English release in 2014.

After the release of the official English localization of Chaos;Head Noah in October 2022, the quality of the localization was criticized by Kiri Kiri Basara as being subpar. Complaints included questionable typography choices such as the lack of quotation marks to indicate dialogue, mistranslations that distort the meaning of certain moments, writing that fails to capture the personalities of the characters, and CGs that were untranslated from the original Japanese and instead had subtitles overlaid onto them. Additionally, the TIPS menu was also criticized for including translator notes and explanations, which was considered to be at odds with its original purpose of providing a glossary for slang and jargon used within the story.

== Related media ==
Chaos;Head has seen several adaptations and tie-in media. The internet radio show Chaos;Head Radio Delusional Radio Channel (Note: Chaos;Head Radio Delusional Radio Channel (Chaos;Head ラジオ 妄想電波局, Chaos;Head Rajio Mōsō Denpakyoku)) began airing on March 28, 2008, to help promote the game and was hosted by Takumi and Rimi's voice actors, Yoshino Hiroyuki and Kitamura Eri. A manga adaptation by Sumihey started serialization in ASCII Media Works' shōnen magazine Dengeki Daioh on May 21, 2008. A second manga, Sakaki Nagako's Chaos;Head: Blue Complex, adapting the events of the story from the character Sena Aoi's perspective, began serialization in Media Factory's seinen magazine Monthly Comic Alive on September 27, 2008. A romantic comedy manga adaptation, Mizuki Takehito's Chaos;Head H, (Note: Chaos;Head H (かおすへっどH, Kaosu Heddo H)) was serialized by Jive in Comic Rush beginning on September 26, 2008. An anime adaptation by Madhouse Studios aired in 2008, and was released in English by Funimation.

After it was made, Chaos;Head's popularity was used to sell the visual novel Steins;Gate, which would go on to be even more successful. It was also used as the base for the rest of the Science Adventure series as well, with every main entry having major connections to Chaos;Head. Two video games directly based on Chaos;Head have been made: the direct sequel Chaos;Head Love Chu Chu! and the thematic sequel Chaos;Child. Additionally, Shikura has said that he wants to create an erotic video game based on Chaos;Head and Chaos;Child, targeting adults. The Chaos;Child anime adaptation also includes an adaptation of Chaos;Head as part of its "episode 0" recap.

The 2009 visual novel Full Metal Daemon Muramasa, Nitroplus's tenth anniversary project, features a Chaos;Head cameo during a scene calling back to many of Nitroplus's previously published works.
