= Takeshi Abo =

Japanese video game composer

Takeshi Abo 阿保 剛
- Born: January 17, 1973 (age 53); Ichinoseki, Iwate, Japan
- Occupation: Composer
- Instrument: Piano
- Years active: 1990–present
- Website: http://valsound.com/

Takeshi Abo (阿保 剛, Abo Takeshi; born January 17, 1973) is a Japanese video game composer. He joined the industry through developer StarCraft, Inc. in the early 1990s, mainly working on conversions of Western video games. In the mid-1990s, he joined KID. After KID declared bankruptcy in December 2006, he has joined 5pb.

== Works ==
- Anonymous;Code
- Chaos;Child
- Chaos;Child Love Chu Chu!!
- Chaos;Head
- Chaos;Head Love Chu Chu!
- Close to ~Inori no Oka
- Dunamis 15
- Disorder 6
- Famicom8BIT - momo-i
- Famicom Detective Club series
  - Famicom Detective Club: The Missing Heir (Nintendo Switch version)
  - Famicom Detective Club: The Girl Who Stands Behind (Nintendo Switch version)
  - Emio – The Smiling Man: Famicom Detective Club
- FlixMix (NEC PC-98 version)
- Gear Works (NEC PC-98 version)
- Gokujyou Seitokai
- Infinity series
  - Never 7: The End of Infinity
  - Ever 17: The Out of Infinity
  - Remember 11: The Age of Infinity
  - 12Riven: The Psi-Climinal of Integral
- Inherit the Earth: Quest for the Orb (NEC PC-98 version)
- Iris ~Irisu~
- King's Bounty (NEC PC-98 & FM Towns versions)
- Lands of Lore: The Throne of Chaos (NEC PC-98 & FM Towns versions)
- Legend of Kyrandia I (NEC PC-98 & FM Towns versions)
- Legend of Kyrandia II: The Hand of Fate (NEC PC-98 & FM Towns versions)
- Lord of the Rings (PC-98 version)
- Mabino x Style
- Marionette Mind
- Megadimension Neptunia VII
- Memories Off
- Memories Off 2nd
- Omoide ni Kawaru Kimi ~Memories Off~
- Memo Off Mix
- Memories Off ~Sorekara~
- Memories Off After Rain
- Memories Off #5 Togireta Film
- Memories Off 6: T-wave
- Might and Magic III: Isles of Terra (unreleased Super Famicom & unreleased NEC PC-9821 versions)
- Might and Magic IV: Clouds of Xeen (NEC PC-98 & FM Towns versions)
- Might and Magic V: Darkside of Xeen (Sci-Fi Themes in original PC and Mac versions / NEC PC-98 & FM Towns versions)
- Monochrome
- My Merry May
- My Merry Maybe
- Occultic;Nine
- Phantom Breaker
- Phantom Breaker: Battle Grounds
- Psycho-Pass: Mandatory Happiness
- Rhyme Star
- Robotics;Notes
- Robotics;Notes DaSH
- Ryu-Koku
- Separate Hearts
- SINce Memories: Off the Starry Sky
- Space Hulk (1993 video game) (NEC PC-98 & unreleased FM Towns versions)
- Starfire
- Steins;Gate
- Steins;Gate 0
- Steins;Gate: Linear Bounded Phenogram
- Steins;Gate: Darling of Loving Vows
- Subete ga F ni Naru
- Tentama series
- Your Memories Off ~Girl's Style~
- Yume no Tsubasa
