= Mages (company) =

Japanese media company

Mages Inc.
- Native name: 株式会社メージス
- Romanized name: Kabushiki gaisha Mējisu
- Formerly: 5pb. Inc. (2005–2011)
- Type: Kabushiki gaisha; Subsidiary
- Industry: Anime; Music; Video games
- Founded: April 6, 2005; 21 years ago Shibuya, Tokyo, Japan
- Headquarters: Shibuya, Tokyo, Japan
- Key people: Chiyomaru Shikura (Executive Producer, Former Chairman)
- Parent: Dwango (2013–2019); Chiyomaru Studio (2019–2020); Colopl (2020–)
- Website: mages.co.jp

Former logo

Mages Inc. (株式会社メージス, Kabushiki gaisha Mējisu; stylized "MAGES.inc"), formerly 5pb. Inc. (株式会社5pb., Kabushiki gaisha 5pb.; short for "The Five powered & basics"), is a Japanese video game developer and record label for video game and anime music.

== History ==
Mages was formed on April 6, 2005, after Chiyomaru Shikura left Scitron to begin the company as its executive director, a position he formerly held until January 2023. The company is divided into two parts, 5pb. Games for the manufacturing of video games, and 5pb. Records for the record label. It was a wholly owned subsidiary of the TYO Group until Shikura purchased the remaining rights from the TYO Group on April 15, 2009. Shikura co-owns 5pb. with AGOne, an affiliate of Dwango Japan. Staff members include scenario writer Naotaka Hayashi, artist Yukihiro Matsuo, and producer Tatsuya Matsuhara.

In April 2011, a group of companies consisting of Arkray, Seed Project, Dwango Creative School, Animelo Summer Life, 5pb. Records, and 5pb. Games merged under the parent company Mages. Inc. led by executive director Chiyomaru Shikura.

In July 2019, Mages was acquired by Shikura's concept studio Chiyomaru Studio, with the goal of being more flexible and fast in its decisions as a company independent from their parent company Dwango and from the Kadokawa group. With that said, while Mages would no longer be a part of Kadokawa Group following the management buyout, it still expected to maintain the same favorable relationship with the Group that it had so far. Along with this buyout, the company intended to strengthen its branding by consolidating the 5pb. brand into Mages.

In March 2020, Colopl acquired Mages from Chiyomaru Studio for ¥1.612 billion (approximately US$14.92 million).

In December 2022, it was reported that Mages would enter insolvency as a result of financial losses of ¥613 million (approximately $4.6 million).

In January 2023, Chiyomaru Shikura announced via Twitter that he would resign as company chairman and executive director, but stated that he would still be part of Mages as an executive producer.

== Artists ==
Previously called 5pb. Records, since 2019 the brand does not exist anymore, with the Mages brand being the only one used for everything.

- Takeshi Abo
- Artery Vein (Eri Kitamura & Asami Imai)
- Asaka
- Asriel
- Ayane
- Ayumu
- Cyua
- cadode (2022–present)
- DG-10
- Akiko Hasegawa
- Rina Hidaki
- FRAM (2022–present)
- fripSide (2008)
- Himeka
- Asami Imai
- Mio Isayama
- Kanako Itō
- Junjou no Afilia
- Kaori
- Kenn
- Kicco
- Asriel's Kokomi
- Riyu Kosaka
- Marina
- Ui Miyazaki
- Halko Momoi
- Ayumi Murata
- Nao
- Romanxia
- Sakura Nogawa
- Yui Sakakibara
- Phantasm (FES cv. Yui Sakakibara)
- Asami Shimoda
- Konomi Suzuki (2018–present)
- Two-Formula (Saeko Zōgō & Kaori Sadohara)
- Velforest
- Zwei

== Video games ==
5pb. Games was a division of Mages, which dealt with video game development. The brand was originally named Five Games Kid, or 5gk. for short, but the name was changed in December 2007 to coincide with the name of 5pb's record label 5pb. Records. Some of 5pb. Games' developers arrived from KID, Tonkin House and Scitron, such as with Takeshi Abo in December 2006. Since 2019, the 5pb. Games brand is not used anymore, with the Mages brand being the only one used for everything.

Year (Note: Initial release)	Title	Platform(s)
2007	Que: Fairy of Ancient Leaf	PS2
2007	Memories Off 5: Encore	PS2, PSP
2007	Umishō	PS2
2008	Your Memories Off: Girl's Style	PS2, PSP
2008	Night Wizard! The Video Game: Denial of the World	PS2
2008	Prism Ark: Awake	PS2
2008	Chaos;Head	Windows
2008	Memories Off	PSP
2008	Memories Off 2nd	PSP
2008	Ghost Hound DS	DS
2008	Kanokon Esuii	PS2
2008	L no Kisetsu 2: Invisible Memories	PS2
2008	Memories Off: Sorekara	PSP
2008	Omoide ni Kanata Kimi: Memories Off	PSP
2008	Memories Off 6: T-wave	PS2, iOS, PSP, X360
2008	Monochrome Factor: Cross Road	PS2
2009	Memories Off 5: Togireta Film	PSP
2009	Oretachi ni Tsubasa wa Nai	PS3, PS Vita, Windows
2009	DoDonPachi DaiOuJou Black Label Extra	X360
2009	Kemeko Deluxe! DS: Yome to Mecha to Otoko to Onna	DS
2009	KimokawaE!	DS
2009	11eyes CrossOver	X360, PSP, iOS
2009	Chaos;Head Noah	X360, PS3, PSP, iOS, Android, PS Vita
2009	Hakushaku to Yōsei: Yume to Kizuna ni Omoi o Hasete	PS2
2009	Hyakko: Yorozuya Jikenbo!	PS2
2009	Skip Beat!	PS2
2009	Memories Off After Rain	PSP
2009	Lucian Bee's: Resurrection Supernova	PSP
2009	Memories Off 6: Next Relation	PS2, X360, PSP
2009	Item Getter: Bokura no Kagaku to Mahō no Kankei	DS
2009	Steins;Gate	X360, PS3, Windows, PSP, iOS, PS Vita, Android, PS4
2009	Taishō Baseball Girls	PSP
2009	L no Kisetsu W pocket	PSP
2009	Tayutama: Kiss on my Deity	X360
2010	Chaos;Head Love Chu Chu!	X360, PS3, PSP, PS Vita
2010	Ketsui: Kizuna Jigoku Tachi Extra	X360
2010	Lucian Bee's: Evil Violet	PS2, PSP
2010	Lucian Bee's: Justice Yellow	PS2, PSP
2010	W.L.O. Sekai Renai Kikō	X360
2010	Memories Off: Yubikiri no Kioku	X360
2010	Corpse Party	PSP, iOS, 3DS, PS4, Switch, XONE
2010	Sharin no Kuni: The Girl Among the Sunflowers	X360
2010	Lucian Bee's: Resurrection Supernova	PSP
2010	Pastel Chime Continue	PSP
2011	Bullet Soul	X360
2011	Memories Off: Yubikiri no Kioku	Windows, PSP
2011	Phantom Breaker	X360
2011	Steins;Gate: My Darling's Embrace	X360, PS3, PSP, PS Vita, PS4, Switch, iOS
2011	Dunamis 15	X360, PS3, PSP
2011	Corpse Party: Book of Shadows	PSP
2011	Steins;Gate: Octet of Shifting Space	Windows
2011	Muv-Luv	X360, PS3, PS Vita
2011	Muv-Luv Alternative	X360, PS3, PS Vita
2011	Ever 17	X360
2011	Beyond the Future: Fix the Time Arrows	PS3, PSP
2012	Robotics;Notes	PS3, X360
2012	Corpse Party: Sachiko's Game of Love Hysteric Birthday 2U	PSP
2012	Bravely Default (Note: Scenario)	3DS
2013	Phantom Breaker: Battle Grounds	X360, PS Vita, Windows
2013	Steins;Gate: Linear Bounded Phenogram	PS3, X360, PS Vita, iOS, PS4, Switch
2013	Haiyore! Nyaruko-san Meijoshigatai Game no Yona Mono	PS Vita
2013	Ketsui: Kizuna Jigoku Tachi Extra	PS3
2013	Disorder 6	PS3, X360
2013	Phantom Breaker: Extra	PS3, X360
2013	Hero X Battle Princess	PS3
2013	Eiyuu*Senki	PS3
2013	Liberation Maiden Sin	PS3
2014	Bullet Soul Infinite Burst	X360
2014	Corpse Party: Blood Drive	PS Vita
2014	Robotics;Notes Elite	PS Vita, PS4, Switch, Windows
2014	Chaos;Child	XONE, PS3, PS4, PS Vita, iOS, Windows, Android
2014	Infinite Stratos: Versus Colors	Windows
2015	Psycho-Pass: Mandatory Happiness	XONE, PS4, PS Vita, Windows
2015	Phantom Breaker: Battle Grounds Overdrive	PS4, Switch
2015	Steins;Gate 0	PS3, PS4, PS Vita, XONE, Switch, Windows
2016	If My Heart Had Wings: Cruise Sign	PS3, PS Vita
2016	Plastic Memories	PS Vita
2017	New Game! The Challenge Stage	PS4, PS Vita
2017	Kamaitachi no Yoru: Rinne Saisei	PS Vita, Windows
2017	Chaos;Child Love Chu Chu!!	PS4, PS Vita
2017	YU-NO: A Girl Who Chants Love at the Bound of this World	PS4, PS Vita, Switch, Windows
2017	KonoSuba: God's Blessing on this Wonderful World! Judgment on this Greedy Game!	PS4, PS Vita, Switch
2017	Occultic;Nine	PS4, PS Vita, XONE
2018	Steins;Gate Elite	PS4, PS Vita, Switch, Windows, iOS
2019	Judgement 7 - Our World is Ended	PS4, Switch
2019	Robotics;Notes DaSH	PS4, Switch, Windows
2020	Ogre Tale	PS4, XONE, XSXS, Switch, Windows
2020	KonoSuba: God's Blessing on this Wonderful World! Love for this Tempting Attire	PS4, Switch
2021	Memories Off Historia Vol. 1	PS4, Switch
2021	Memories Off Historia Vol. 2	PS4, Switch
2021	Quintessential Quintuplets ∬: Summer Memories	PS4, Switch
2021	SINce Memories: Off the Starry Sky	PS4, Switch, Windows
2021	Famicom Detective Club: The Missing Heir	Switch
2021	Famicom Detective Club: The Girl Who Stands Behind	Switch
2021	Miyamoto Mathematics Classroom KENKEN - The World's Most Exciting Math and Logic Puzzle -	Switch
2021	TIMINGooo!	Switch
2021	Yuru Camp△: Have a nice day!	PS4, Switch
2022	Phantom Breaker: Omnia	PS4, XONE, Switch, Windows
2022	The Quintessential Quintuplets Movie: Five Memories of My Time with You	PS4, Switch
2022	Anonymous;Code	PS4, Switch, Windows
2023	Summer Time Rendering: Another Horizon	PS4, Switch
2024	KonoSuba: God's Blessing on this Wonderful World! Love For These Clothes Of Desire!	Windows
2024	Iwakura Aria	Switch
2024	Emio – The Smiling Man: Famicom Detective Club	Switch
2025	Mystereet ~Yasogami Kaoru no Chousen!~	PS4, XSXS, Switch, Windows
2025	Gekisou! BAND STAR	Switch
2026	Corpse Party II: Darkness Distortion	PS4, PS5, Switch, Windows
2026	Memories Off Sousou: Break out of my shell	PS4, PS5, Switch, Windows
2026	The Angel Next Door Spoils Me Rotten: Memorial Vacation	Switch, Switch 2
2026	My Merry May with be	PS4, Switch
2026	Fukakutei Sekai no Tantei Shinshi ~Agyou Souma no Jiken File~	PS4, XSXS, Switch
2026	Steins;Gate Re:Boot	PS4, PS5, XSXS, Switch, Switch 2, Windows
TBA	Steins;Gate 0 Elite	TBA
TBA	Steins;???	TBA

== Chiyomaru Studio ==
Chiyo St. Inc.
- The studio's planetarium projector logo represents how entertainment is the projection of people's dreams.
- Trade name: Chiyomaru Studio
- Native name: 千代丸スタジオ
- Romanized name: Chiyomaru Sutajio
- Formerly: Chrome Edge
- Key people: Chiyomaru Shikura
- Products: Science Adventure
- Subsidiaries: Mages (2019–2020)
- Website: chiyomaru-studio.com

Chiyo St. Inc., doing business as Chiyomaru Studio (Japanese: 千代丸スタジオ, Hepburn: Chiyomaru Sutajio), is a multimedia concept studio led by Chiyomaru Shikura, the representative director and president of Mages. The company, which was originally named Chrome Edge (クロウムエッジ, Kuroumu Ejji), was founded separately from Mages for the purpose of managing the copyrights to the media projects Shikura works on, including the Science Adventure, and for creating stories for use in various media. In July 2019, Chiyomaru Studio made a management buyout of Mages, acquiring all shares held by its former parent company Dwango; the following year, Chiyomaru Studio sold all Mages shares to Colopl.

While the concept work is done by Chiyomaru Studio, they work together with Mages to develop video games using the concepts, and with Kadokawa Corporation to print books and produce anime and manga. The studio includes staff members from Mages, who communicate through instant messaging; as of 2015, Shikura was the only on-site staff.

The first new intellectual property developed by Chiyomaru Studio was the video game Anonymous;Code, which was developed together with Mages' video games division 5pb. Games, and it is the 6th main title of the Science Adventure multimedia franchise. Chiyomaru Studio has also developed the Robotics;Notes spin-off Science Adventure game Robotics;Notes DaSH. Since 2017, the studio organizes live music events where they also release updates on their media projects, called "Chiyo-ST Live".

== See also ==
- Kaga Create, whose former subsidiary CyberFront was acquired by 5pb
- KID, whose assets 5pb acquired as part of CyberFront
