= Steins;Gate Drama CD Alpha, Beta, and Gamma =

2010 audio dramas based on video game Steins;Gate

- Cover art for Alpha, featuring Faris (left) and Kurisu (right)

5pb. audio drama
- Series: Science Adventure
- Featuring: Mamoru Miyano; Asami Imai; Kana Hanazawa
- Music: Takeshi Abo
- Length: 53:16 (Alpha); 63:29 (Beta); 58:03 (Gamma)
- Release date: March 31, 2010 (Alpha); April 28, 2010 (Beta); June 2, 2010 (Gamma)
- Language: Japanese

Steins;Gate Drama CD Alpha, Beta, and Gamma, (Note: The audio dramas are, respectively, subtitled: Babel of the Grieved Maze – Divergence 0.571046% (Japanese: 「哀心迷図のバベル」ダイバージェンス0.571046%, Hepburn: Aishin Meizu no Baberu – Daibājensu 0.571046%); Arc-light of the Point at Infinity – Divergence 1.130205% (「無限遠点のアークライト」ダイバージェンス1.130205%, Mugenenten no Ākuraito – Daibājensu 1.130205%); Hyde of the Dark Dimension – Divergence 2.615074% (「暗黒次元のハイド」ダイバージェンス2.615074%, Ankokujigen no Haido – Daibājensu 2.615074%)) stylized as α, β, and γ, are a trilogy of audio dramas based on the 2009 video game Steins;Gate, and are part of the Science Adventure series. It follows Kurisu Makise, Mayuri Shiina, and Rintaro Okabe, three characters from the Steins;Gate game, in three different alternative histories. Alpha shows Kurisu's actions during the tenth chapter of the video game, Beta shows what happened after Okabe failed to save Kurisu, and Gamma shows a reality where the Year 2000 problem caused a disaster and Okabe became an agent working for the organization SERN.

The audio dramas were originally published as three CD albums by 5pb. between March and June 2010, and were later collected along with other Steins;Gate material in a 2016 box set. They feature voice acting by the cast from the Steins;Gate game, and music and cover art by the game's composer Takeshi Abo and character designer Huke, respectively. The dramas were well received by critics and popular with fans, leading to the creation of manga and light novel adaptations. They were also used as the base for the Epigraph Trilogy of light novels and the Steins;Gate 0 video game. The trilogy was recorded in Japanese, but all three drama has gotten an English fan translation.

== Synopsis ==
=== Characters and setting ===
The audio dramas are set in Akihabara, Tokyo, and follow the neuroscientist Kurisu Makise, and childhood friends Rintaro Okabe and Mayuri Shiina. Together with the hacker Itaru "Daru" Hashida, they have accidentally discovered time travel through the use of a modified microwave oven, which they use to send text messages back in time, which they refer to as "D-mails". This draws the attention of SERN, an organization that secretly researches time travel, who sends out a group called "Rounders" to take the time machine, killing Mayuri in the process. Within the Steins;Gate world, time consists of alternative possible histories ("world lines") which branch and re-merge at different points. It is deterministic, with events occurring at points where world lines converge being destined to happen unless history is changed enough to lead to another cluster of world lines (an "attractor field") with different converging points. One such convergence point is Mayuri's death in 2010 in the alpha attractor field; to prevent it, Okabe causes a shift to the beta attractor field, where Kurisu was killed, and where Okabe did not discover time travel.

=== Plot ===
==== Alpha ====
Alpha: Babel of the Grieved Maze follows Kurisu, and is set during the tenth chapter of the Steins;Gate game, "Paradox Meltdown". After Kurisu and Okabe have decided that they should cause a shift to the beta attractor field, Kurisu spends time contemplating her coming death. She meets Faris, a staff member at a maid café, and learns that Faris's and Kurisu's respective fathers, Yukitaka Akiha and doctor Nakabachi, knew each other. They listen to one of Yukitaka's audio diary cassettes, on which a conversation between Yukitaka, Nakabachi and an unknown third party, professor Hashida, discuss researching time travel. They later find and listen to an audio recording in which Nakabachi expresses regret over having rejected Kurisu; motivated, she runs to tell Okabe that she loves him before he causes the world line shift.

==== Beta ====
Beta: Arc-light of the Point at Infinity follows Mayuri, and is set in the beta attractor field, after Daru's future daughter, Suzuha Amane, brought Okabe back in time to save Kurisu; this is necessary to avoid a world line where Kurisu's time travel theories are stolen, resulting in an arms race leading up to World War III. Okabe fails at first, as world line convergence appears to make Kurisu's death inevitable; Suzuha is about to make him try one more time, but Mayuri stops her, as she thinks Okabe has suffered enough.

Suzuha does not go back to the time she came from, still intending to get Okabe to try once more, but notes that due to a lack of fuel, the time machine will no longer be able to go back far enough after less than a year has passed. After that time is nearly up, Suzuha gets ready to travel back in time and try saving Kurisu herself, but Mayuri follows along. They arrive just after the past Suzuha and Okabe left to save Kurisu for the first time, and Mayuri tells her past self that she needs to get Okabe to try again. The scene from the beginning plays out again, but Mayuri slaps Okabe and tells him that he is not the type to give up. The future Mayuri and Suzuha leave before the past Okabe and Suzuha return, with too little fuel to be able to tell where they will end up.

==== Gamma ====
Gamma: Hyde of the Dark Dimension follows Okabe, and is set in the gamma attractor field; he got there when attempting to undo the changes caused by his friend Luka Urushibara's D-mail in the Steins;Gate game. He discovers that in this world line, he is a Rounder partnered with Moeka Kiryu, and that they have just completed a mission to kill Europol agents who have discovered their identities. He runs to the laboratory to shift to the previous world line with a D-mail, but is stopped by Kurisu and Suzuha: Kurisu witnessed Okabe killing the agents, and Suzuha has in this world line traveled back in time to stop Okabe from becoming a dictator, leader of the Rounders, and a member of the Committee of 300. Kurisu calls the police, but Moeka helps Okabe escape. They visit Mayuri, who is hospitalized, and Okabe learns that they were childhood friends but got separated after the Year 2000 problem occurred, which led to a catastrophe and the death of Mayuri and Okabe's families. Learning that Mayuri has cancer and is not expected to live for much longer, Okabe leaves to clear his head.

Moeka questions Luka about Okabe's D-mail, and concludes that the Year 2000 problem likely was caused by SERN. Moeka assures Okabe that they do not have to worry about Kurisu's report, as the Rounders are pressuring the police. She says that they are like family in this world line, since Okabe saved her when she tried to commit suicide, and that she wants to help him even though he is different from the Okabe she knows. They receive their next mission – to take the time machine and its creators to SERN – but they decide to betray SERN, forcefully entering the laboratory prior to the scheduled mission; the other Rounders appear and shoot Okabe, but Moeka manages to send a D-mail that causes a world line shift, away from the gamma attractor field.

== Cast ==
Character	Voice actor
Rintaro Okabe	Mamoru Miyano
Kurisu Makise	Asami Imai
Mayuri Shiina	Kana Hanazawa
Itaru "Daru" Hashida	Tomokazu Seki
Suzuha Amane	Yukari Tamura
Luka Urushibara	Yū Kobayashi
Faris NyanNyan	Haruko Momoi
Moeka Kiryu	Saori Gotō
Yugo "Mr. Braun" Tennouji	Masaki Terasoma
Doctor Nakabachi	Mitsuru Ogata
Yukitaka Akiha	Taira Kikumoto

== Production and release ==
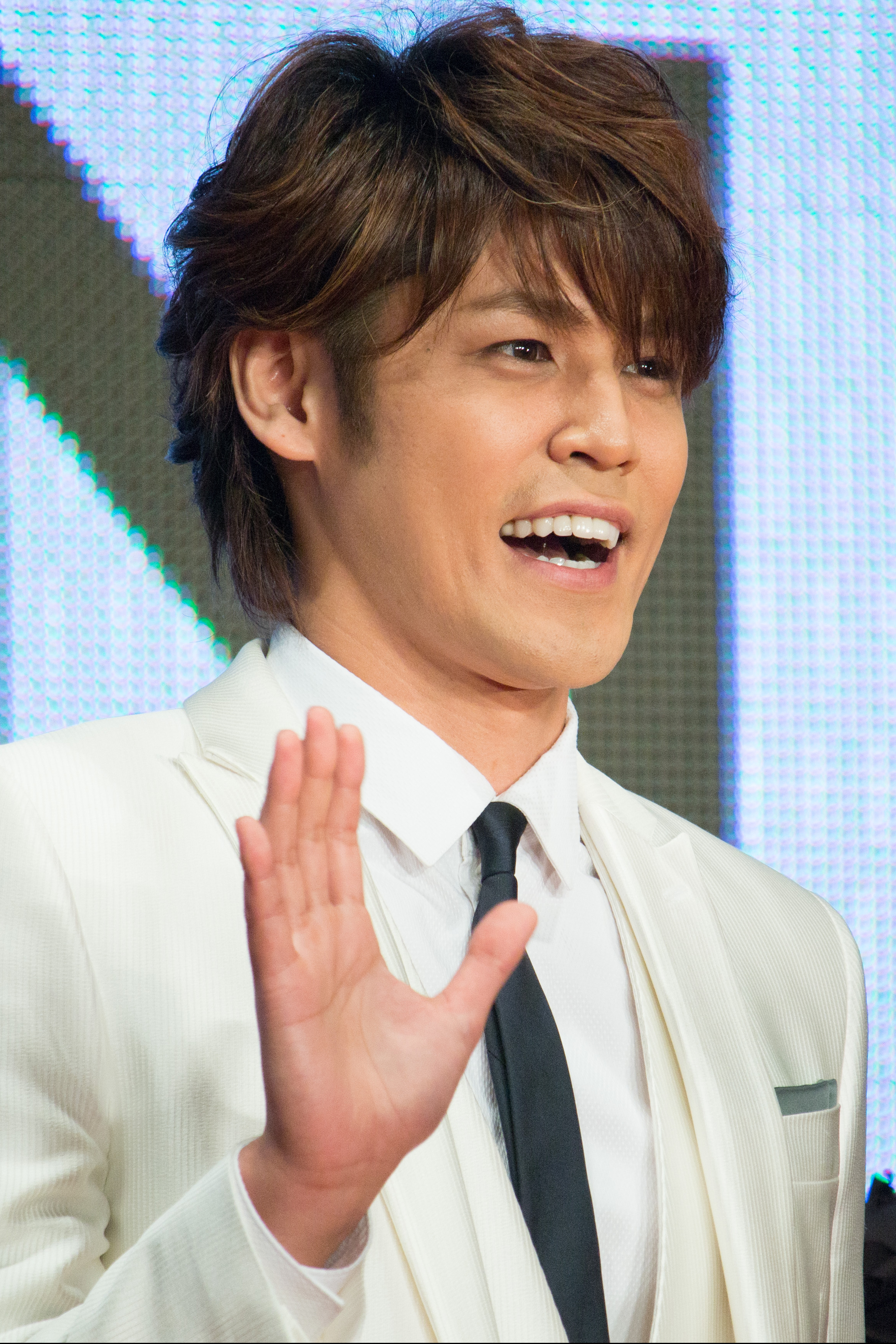
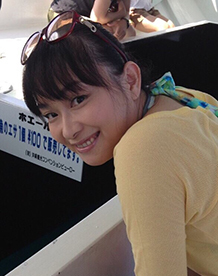
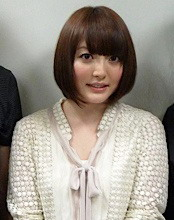
The voice cast from the game reprised their roles, including Mamoru Miyano (Okabe), Asami Imai (Kurisu), and Kana Hanazawa (Mayuri).

The dramas feature background music composed by Takeshi Abo, who previously composed the music for the Steins;Gate game, and cover art by the game's character designer Huke. The voice cast of the game also reprised their roles, and said that it was fun to be able to return to their respective characters. Alpha, Beta, and Gamma were the first audio dramas based on Steins;Gate, and were conceived as a trilogy of stories. They were published by 5pb. and distributed by Media Factory as three separate CD albums in 2010, on March 31, April 28, and June 2, respectively. They were also included in the 2016 box set The Sound of Steins;Gate Complete, along with other Steins;Gate dramas, music and light novel e-books.

== Reception and legacy ==
Alpha and Beta both charted on the Oricon Albums Chart for four consecutive weeks, peaking at seventeenth place on April 12 and May 10, 2010, respectively. Gamma charted for two consecutive weeks, peaking at eleventh place on June 14. According to RPGFan, Alpha, Beta, and Gamma are popularly considered to be the most interesting of all Steins;Gate audio dramas. Famitsu described Alpha as something that Steins;Gate players could not afford to miss out on. Kotaku's Richard Eisenbeis was highly positive to Gamma, calling it "an awesome extra hour-long adventure and a great listen". Patrick Gann of RPGFan considered the audio dramas' amount of writing and acting impressive, and noted that they covered a wide range of emotions, reflected in both acting and music.

Due to the popularity of Beta, it was used as a base for the plot of the Epigraph Trilogy of Steins;Gate novels; both the Epigraph Trilogy and the audio dramas were later used as a base for the story in the Steins;Gate game's sequel, Steins;Gate 0. A manga adaptation of Alpha was created by Shinichirou Nariie and serialized by Shueisha in their Ultra Jump magazine between May 15, 2012, and January 2014. Nariie also adapted Beta into a manga, which ran in Ultra Jump from April 9, 2014, to September of the same year. Alpha was also adapted into a light novel, with writing by Shie Akatoki, illustrations by Nariie, and a cover illustration by Huke, and was published on April 20, 2013, by Kadokawa Corporation. Gamma received an English fan translation which combined the audio with art assets from the Steins;Gate game to create a cutscene in the style of the game; Eisenbeis called it "amazing", and considered it the "crowning achievement" of the Steins;Gate spin-off translations done by that translation group. The main translator for this release was Andrew Hodgson, who also worked on the Steins;Gate game's official localization. In June 2026, Mages announced that the story of Gamma would be adapted into the upcoming remake of the original video game, Steins;Gate Re:Boot.
