= Andrew Hodgson (translator) =

British translator

- Born: 15 January 1994 (age 32); Northumberland, UK
- Other names: Reading Steiner; Steiner
- Occupation: Translator
- Years active: 2014–present
- Website: abhodgson.com

Andrew Hodgson (born 15 January 1994), also known by the online alias Reading Steiner, is a British professional Japanese-to-English translator often working with J-Novel Club and PQube Games. His output encompasses numerous forms of Japanese media, including light novels, manga, video games, and art books. Some of his most notable works include Steins;Gate, In Another World With My Smartphone, Sword Art Online: Alicization Lycoris, Infinite Dendrogram, and Rance X: Showdown.

== Career ==
Hodgson participated in various fan translation projects for several years before, in 2011, joining a group that was working on localizing Steins;Gate. After the release of the fan translation patch, several members of the group, including Hodgson, were approached by JAST USA about an official release. Steins;Gate would become Hodgson's first officially credited work.

In 2017, following his work on several additional video game projects, Hodgson approached J-Novel Club after learning that they had licensed the Occultic;Nine light novels, another entry in the Science Adventure franchise of which Steins;Gate is a part. Immediately after joining the company, he began work on In Another World With My Smartphone, and took over translation for Infinite Dendrogram shortly after.

Hodgson worked briefly with the now-defunct Sol Press, translating the first volume of Harem Royale: When The Game Ends in 2018. After the company's forfeit and closure, he characterized its leadership as inexperienced and uncommunicative. In 2021, Hodgson announced he was beginning work on Rance X: Showdown.

In June 2022, Hodgson joined PQube full-time as their Localisation Coordinator, and became the Head of Localisation Operations in October.

== Personal life ==
Hodgson has one younger brother and one younger sister.

== Works ==
=== Light novels ===
Title	Year	Original author(s)	Notes	Source
In Another World With My Smartphone	2017–2023	Patora Fuyuhara	Up to Volume 27	
Infinite Dendrogram	2017 – present	Sakon Kaidou		
Sorcerous Stabber Orphen: The Wayward Journey	2018–2020	Yoshinobu Akita	Up to Volume 6	
The Hitchhiker's Guide to the Isekai	2020	Carlo Zen, Tappei Nagatsuki, Natsuya Semikawa, Natsu Hyuuga, Katsuie Shibata, Hoko Tsuda	Case 05 only	
Seabed Audio Novel Collection	2022 – present			

=== Manga ===
Title	Year	Original artist	Notes	Source
Harem Royale: When The Game Ends	2018	Higa Yukari	Volume 1 only	
Infinite Dendrogram	2019 – present	Kami Imai		
Loner Life in Another World	2020 – present	Bibi		
Shed that Skin, Ryugasaki-san!	2020 – present	Kazutomo Ichitomo		
My Dad's the Queen of All VTubers?!	2020–2022	Wataru Akashingo		
Steins;Gate 0	2021–2022	Taka Himeno		
Tokyo Interstellar Immigration	2022 – present	Madoguchi Moto		
Robotics;Notes	TBA	Asakawa Keiji		

=== Video games ===
Title	Year	Platform(s)	Notes	Source
Steins;Gate	2014	Microsoft Windows, PlayStation Vita, PlayStation 3, iOS, Android		
Valkyrie Drive: Bhikkhuni	2015	Microsoft Windows, PlayStation Vita		
Dies irae: Amantes Amentes	2016	Microsoft Windows		
Dies irae: Interview with Kaziklu Bey	2018	Microsoft Windows		
Our World is Ended	2018	Microsoft Windows, PlayStation 4, Nintendo Switch		
Baldr Sky	2019	Microsoft Windows		
Raging Loop	2019	Microsoft Windows, PlayStation 4, Nintendo Switch, Android		
SeaBed	2020	Microsoft Windows, Nintendo Switch		
Seven Days	2020	Microsoft Windows	Murasaki route only	
Sword Art Online: Alicization Lycoris	2020	Microsoft Windows, PlayStation 4, Xbox One		
Eiyu Senki: War Wonder	2021	Microsoft Windows, Android		
Mamiya: A Shared Illusion of the World's End	2021	Microsoft Windows		
Rewrite+	2021	Microsoft Windows		
Maglam Lord	2022	PlayStation 4, Nintendo Switch		
Metal Max Xeno: Reborn	2022	Microsoft Windows, PlayStation 4, Nintendo Switch		
Evenicle II	2022	Microsoft Windows		
Hello Lady!	2022	Microsoft Windows		
Super Bullet Break	2022	Microsoft Windows, PlayStation 4, Nintendo Switch		
Anonymous;Code	2023	Microsoft Windows, PlayStation 4, Nintendo Switch		
Rance X: Showdown	TBA	Microsoft Windows		
Rewrite: Harvest Festa	TBA	Microsoft Windows		
Omega Labyrinth Z	Cancelled	PlayStation Vita, PlayStation 4	Release was blocked by Sony	

=== Art books ===
Title	Year	Original Artist(s)	Notes	Source
Dragon's Crown: Official Artworks	2019	George Kamitani		
Shigenori Soejima & P-Studio Art Unit: Art Works II	2019	Shigenori Soejima		
Mikulife: KEI's Hatsune Miku Illustration Works	2020	KEI		
Sengoku Rance Hardcopy Edition Booklet	2020	Alicesoft		
Street Fighter Memorial Archive: Beyond the World	2021	Bengus, Kiki, Kinu Nishimura, Akiman		
Rance Quest Magnum Hardcopy Edition Booklet	2022	Alicesoft		
Nioh & Nioh 2: Official Artworks Hardcover	TBA			
