= Steins;??? =

Upcoming video game

- Logo
- Developer(s): Chiyomaru Studio, Mages
- Publisher(s): Mages
- Writer(s): Chiyomaru Shikura
- Series: Science Adventure

Steins;??? (tentative title) (Note: Japanese: Shutainzu ○○ (シュタインズ・○○; "Steins;[blank]")) is an upcoming video game developed by Chiyomaru Studio and Mages, the latter of which would publish the game. It is a thematic sequel to Steins;Gate (2009), and is part of the Science Adventure series. The game is written by Mages' representative director Chiyomaru Shikura, and previously went under the working title Steins;God.

== Overview ==
Steins;??? is a thematic sequel to Steins;Gate (2009), and part of the larger Science Adventure series. The developers describe the game as being to Steins;Gate what Chaos;Child is to Chaos;Head. (Note: Chaos;Child is a thematic sequel to Chaos;Head with new characters.) Characters from Steins;Gate are planned to appear in Steins;???, along with new ones.

== Development ==
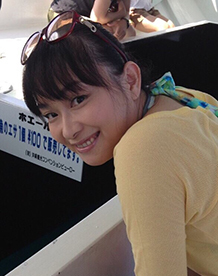
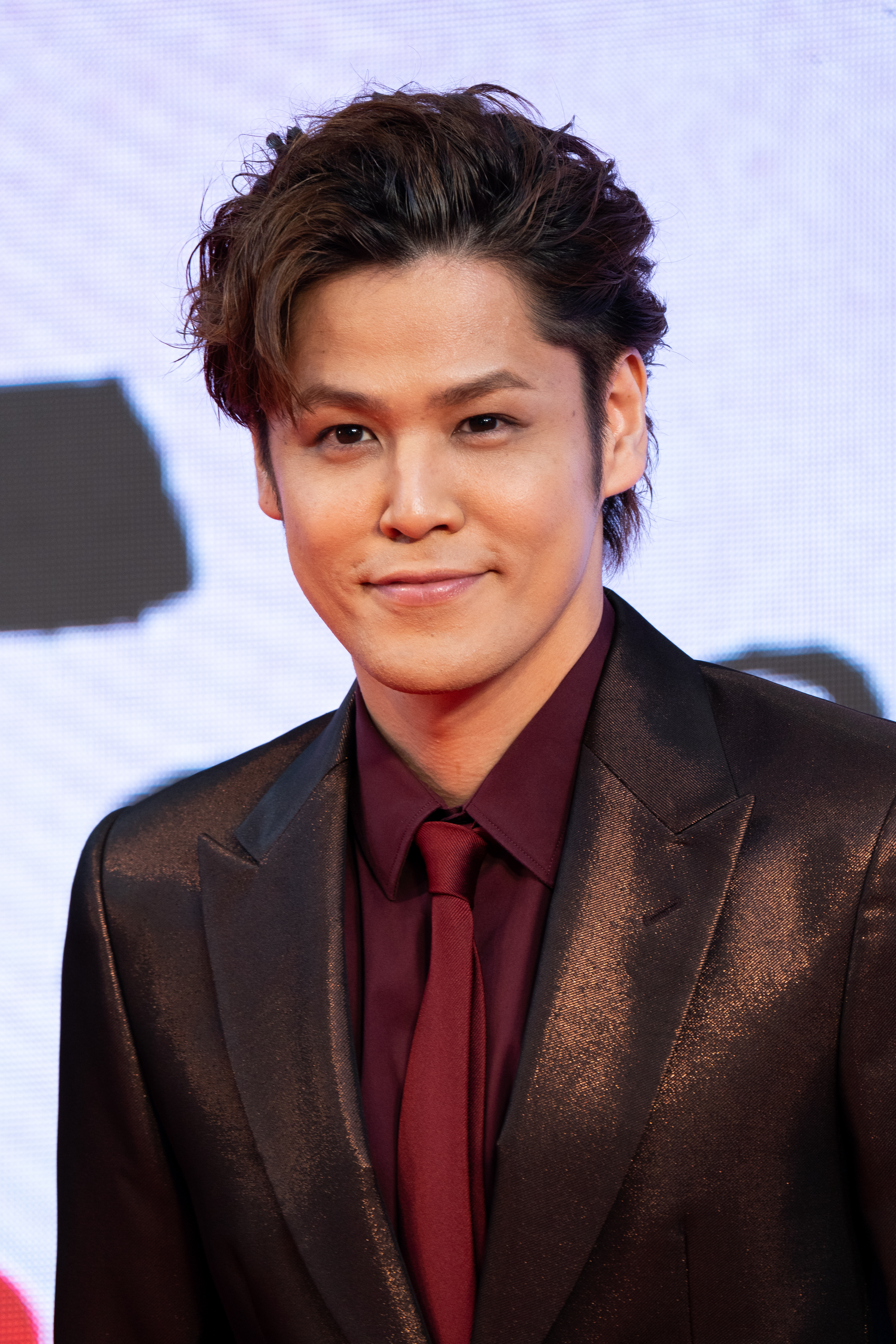
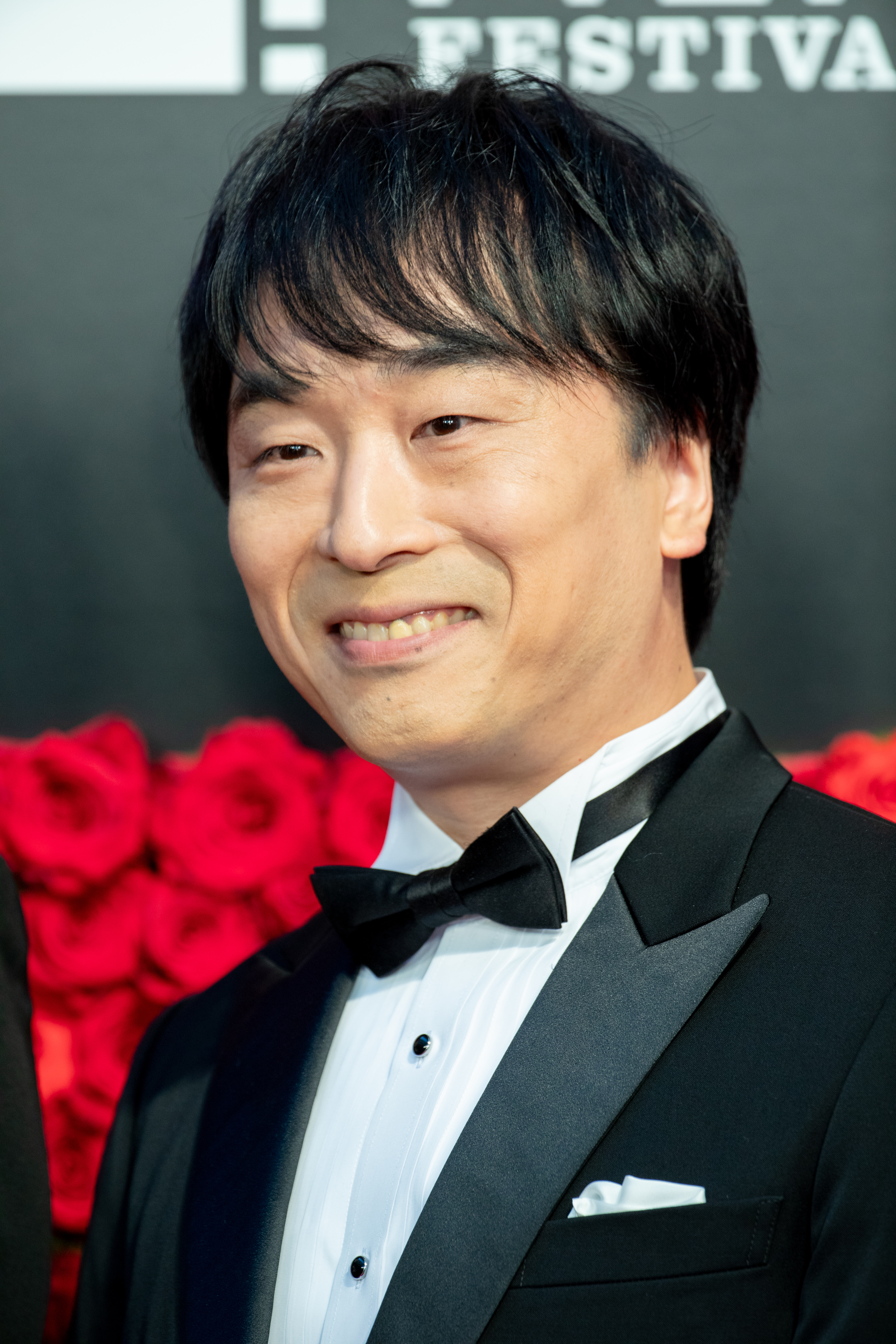
Voice actors Asami Imai, Mamoru Miyano, and Tomokazu Seki are set to be part of the game.

Steins;??? is in development by Chiyomaru Studio and Mages, and is written by Mages' representative director Chiyomaru Shikura. It was initially known internally under the working title Steins;God (Note: Japanese: Shutainzu Goddo (シュタインズ・ゴッド)) until Shikura decided against it. Shikura wanted to create something new with Steins;???, as he considered Steins;Gate to be complete after the original game and Steins;Gate 0, and thought that further Steins;Gate games would be redundant. The idea of creating a Steins;Gate take on Chaos;Child came from how, although Chaos;Child's plot had been well received, it had only sold about a tenth as many copies as Steins;Gate.

Shikura brought up the concept of a Steins;God game in a Famitsu interview in September 2018, and Science Adventure series producer Tatsuya Matsubara teased that a new game in the series was in development by February 2019. The game was eventually announced by Mages during their business strategy presentation in October 2020, as part of a celebration of the original Steins;Gate's tenth anniversary, with the second half of the title obscured; at the time, Shikura had finished planning a large amount of the game's story sequences.

Voice actors Asami Imai, Mamoru Miyano, and Tomokazu Seki, who respectively played the characters Kurisu Makise, Rintaro Okabe, and Itaru "Daru" Hashida in Steins;Gate, are set to be part of the project.

Steins;??? is planned to be released by Mages, but the release date and platform have not been revealed. According to Shikura, it is possible that an anime or film adaptation of Steins;??? could be released before the game itself is available, depending on the publisher's intellectual property department; other Steins;??? media, such as novels, was not planned as of 2020. In a November 2024 interview, Matsubara stated that concepts for Steins;??? were in the process of being put together.
