= Steins;Gate: My Darling's Embrace =

2011 video game

- Cover art, featuring the characters Kurisu Makise (left) and Rintaro Okabe (right)
- Developer: 5pb.
- Publishers: JP: 5pb.; WW: Spike Chunsoft
- Producer: Naotaka Hayashi
- Writer: Tatsuya Matsubara
- Composer: Takeshi Abo
- Series: Science Adventure
- Platforms: Xbox 360; PlayStation Portable; PlayStation 3; PlayStation Vita; iOS; Nintendo Switch; Microsoft Windows; PlayStation 4
- Release: June 16, 2011: Xbox 360; JP: June 16, 2011 PlayStation Portable; JP: April 26, 2012 PlayStation 3; JP: May 24, 2012 PlayStation Vita; JP: March 14, 2013 iOS; JP: October 3, 2013 Nintendo Switch; JP: March 20, 2019; WW: December 10, 2019 Windows, PS4; WW: December 10, 2019
- Genre: Visual novel
- Mode: Single-player

Steins;Gate: My Darling's Embrace (Note: Known in Japan as Steins;Gate: Hiyoku Renri no Darling (Japanese: シュタインズ・ゲート 比翼恋理のだーりん, Hepburn: Shutainzu Gēto: Hiyoku Renri no Dārin; lit. "Steins;Gate: Darling of Loving Vows")) is a visual novel video game developed by 5pb., originally released for the Xbox 360 in 2011. It has since been ported to several other platforms, and was released by Spike Chunsoft in English for the Nintendo Switch, PlayStation 4, and Microsoft Windows in 2019. It is part of the Science Adventure series, and a spin-off from the 2009 game Steins;Gate. The game is a romantic comedy set in a different world from the one in the original Steins;Gate, where the player builds romantic relationships with Steins;Gate characters. By making certain choices and interacting with the player character's cell phone, the player can affect the direction of the plot.

The game was produced by Naotaka Hayashi, and featured scenario supervision by Tatsuya Matsubara, as opposed to the original Steins;Gate, where 5pb.'s Chiyomaru Shikura planned the story on his own; after having worked on the anime adaptation of Steins;Gate, he realized that, with the game world being fully established, he could let other writers work on it and bring in new ideas. The game was well received by critics and multiple publications for its writing and art.

== Synopsis ==
My Darling's Embrace is a spin-off from Steins;Gate, and is a romantic comedy visual novel taking place in a different world line than those in the original game. In the world line the game takes place in, the characters still have the possibility to change the past by using D-mails, but SERN has little influence and does not have rounders hunt the main cast. Instead, the player character Rintaro Okabe's main problem is paying the bills for the laboratory, having to take a part-time job as a waiter. The game has multiple routes, each focusing on Okabe building a romantic relationship with one of the characters from Steins;Gate. The player affects the direction of the plot by picking choices, by answering Okabe's phone, and by clicking on highlighted text within text messages on the phone. The game does not feature any game over states or routes where the player loses.

== Production ==
=== Development ===
The game was developed by 5pb., and was produced by Naotaka Hayashi. While 5pb.'s Chiyomaru Shikura planned the story for the original Steins;Gate game on his own, My Darling's Embrace was written by other writers under scenario supervision by Tatsuya Matsubara. This change came from when Shikura was working on the anime adaptation of Steins;Gate, and realized that since the concept of the game's world had been fully established, he could let other writers who understand the world work on Steins;Gate projects and bring new ideas to it. The concept for My Darling's Embrace as a romance game, according to Matsubara, came from how there was a trend in Japan to develop secondary games after the release of a visual novel, that explored characters more in depth; he did however not want to water down the main Steins;Gate narrative by portraying Okabe's struggle from the original game again, so he decided to set the game in a "peaceful, fun worldline".

=== Release ===
My Darling's Embrace was announced in February 2011 by Famitsu, and was described as a fan disc. It was originally released for the Xbox 360 on June 16, 2011, and was later released for several other platforms: the PlayStation Portable on April 26, 2012, the PlayStation 3 on May 24, 2012, the PlayStation Vita on March 14, 2013, and iOS on October 3, 2013. The Xbox 360 version became playable on Xbox One through backward compatibility on May 19, 2017, along with the original Steins;Gate and its spin-off Steins;Gate: Linear Bounded Phenogram. The game was also released for the Nintendo Switch as part of the collection Steins;Gate: Divergencies Assort along with Steins;Gate 0 and Steins;Gate: Linear Bounded Phenogram on March 20, 2019 in Japan. The Xbox 360, PlayStation 3, and PlayStation Vita versions were both available separately and in bundles with the original Steins;Gate; the PlayStation Vita bundle also included a ticket to Steins;Gate: The Movie − Load Region of Déjà Vu and a metal charm. The game was published in English for the first time by Spike Chunsoft on December 10, 2019, for the Nintendo Switch, PlayStation 4, and Microsoft Windows.

== Reception ==
Reception

Aggregate score
Aggregator	Score
Metacritic	NS: 73/100

Review score
Publication	Score
Famitsu	X360: 30/40; VITA: 32/40

My Darling's Embrace was met by "positive reviews", according to the review aggregator platform Metacritic. Zenji Ishii at Famitsu compared My Darling's Embrace favorably to other bishōjo games, saying that it manages to create drama and tension despite how the game does not have a tragic element to it like the original Steins;Gate. He praised the writing as the work of a skilled scenario writer with a great understanding of the characters and world, and said that it manages to develop the characters and world further, giving them more depth, and that the portrayal of characters' emotions was well handled, allowing the player to feel immersed in the world. He particularly cited Luka and Moeka's routes as interesting, due to the different atmosphere that comes with a romantic route with an otokonoko character, and how the game manages to make the player reconsider their opinion on Moeka from the original Steins;Gate. He did note that because of the story's sense of safety and how it does not go off into a more serious direction, the game might feel unsatisfying of something impactful to some players, but also said that it fits in with the tone of the early chapters of the original Steins;Gate, where he considered the characters' everyday activities and light conversation part of what makes the game good. Richard Eisenbeis at Kotaku called the art excellent, and said that the game might "sate [players'] appetites" while waiting for the then upcoming game Steins;Gate 0. Patrick Gann of RPGFan described the game's opening theme, "La*La*La Labolution", as "wretched", particularly noting the singers' "super-cute, super-nasal unison choir thing". Famitsu gave the PlayStation Vita version of the game their "Gold Award".

During its debut week, the Xbox 360 version was the fourth best selling game in Japan, with 31,666 copies sold, and with the Steins;Gate bundle in fifth place, selling an additional 11,041 copies; this boosted sales of the Xbox 360 console, putting it in seventh place on the Japanese hardware charts for the week. The PlayStation Portable version was the sixth best selling game in Japan during its first week, with 24,849 copies sold, while the PlayStation 3 version was the eighteenth with 5,397 copies sold and an additional 9,223 copies of the PlayStation 3 Steins;Gate bundle. The PlayStation Vita version, however, did not enter the weekly top 20 charts at all during its debut week.
