= Robotics;Notes DaSH =

- Cover art, featuring Akiho and Kaito
- Developer: Mages
- Publishers: JP: Mages; WW: Spike Chunsoft
- Producer: Tatsuya Matsubara
- Artists: Tomonori Fukuda; Makoto Ishiwata; Yukihiro Matsuo
- Writers: Naotaka Hayashi; Toru Yasumoto; Chiyomaru Shikura
- Composer: Takeshi Abo
- Series: Science Adventure
- Platforms: PlayStation 4, Nintendo Switch, Windows
- Release: PS4, Switch: JP: January 31, 2019; NA: October 13, 2020; EU: October 16, 2020; Windows: WW: October 14, 2020
- Genre: Visual novel
- Mode: Single-player

Robotics;Notes DaSH, (short for Daru the Super Hacker) is a visual novel video game developed by Mages. It is part of the Science Adventure series, and is a sequel to the 2012 game Robotics;Notes. It was released in 2019 in Japan for the PlayStation 4 and Nintendo Switch, and was released in English in 2020 for the same platforms and Windows by Spike Chunsoft. The game was written by Toru Yasumoto and Chiyomaru Shikura and produced by Tatsuya Matsubara, with character designs by Tomonori Fukuda, mechanical designs by Makoto Ishiwata and Yukihiro Matsuo, and music by Takeshi Abo.

The story is set half a year after the events of Robotics;Notes, and follows the former members of the robotics club. It features several crossover elements with other games in the series, including the appearance of the Steins;Gate character Itaru "Daru" Hashida. The game's story branches into different directions throughout the game, based on destinations the player chooses in the in-game mobile app Deluoode Map.

Reviewers enjoyed the game's writing and visuals, as well as its depiction of Tanegashiman culture, and considered it appealing to fans of Steins;Gate and the Science Adventure series in general due to things like Daru's involvement in the story.

== Overview ==
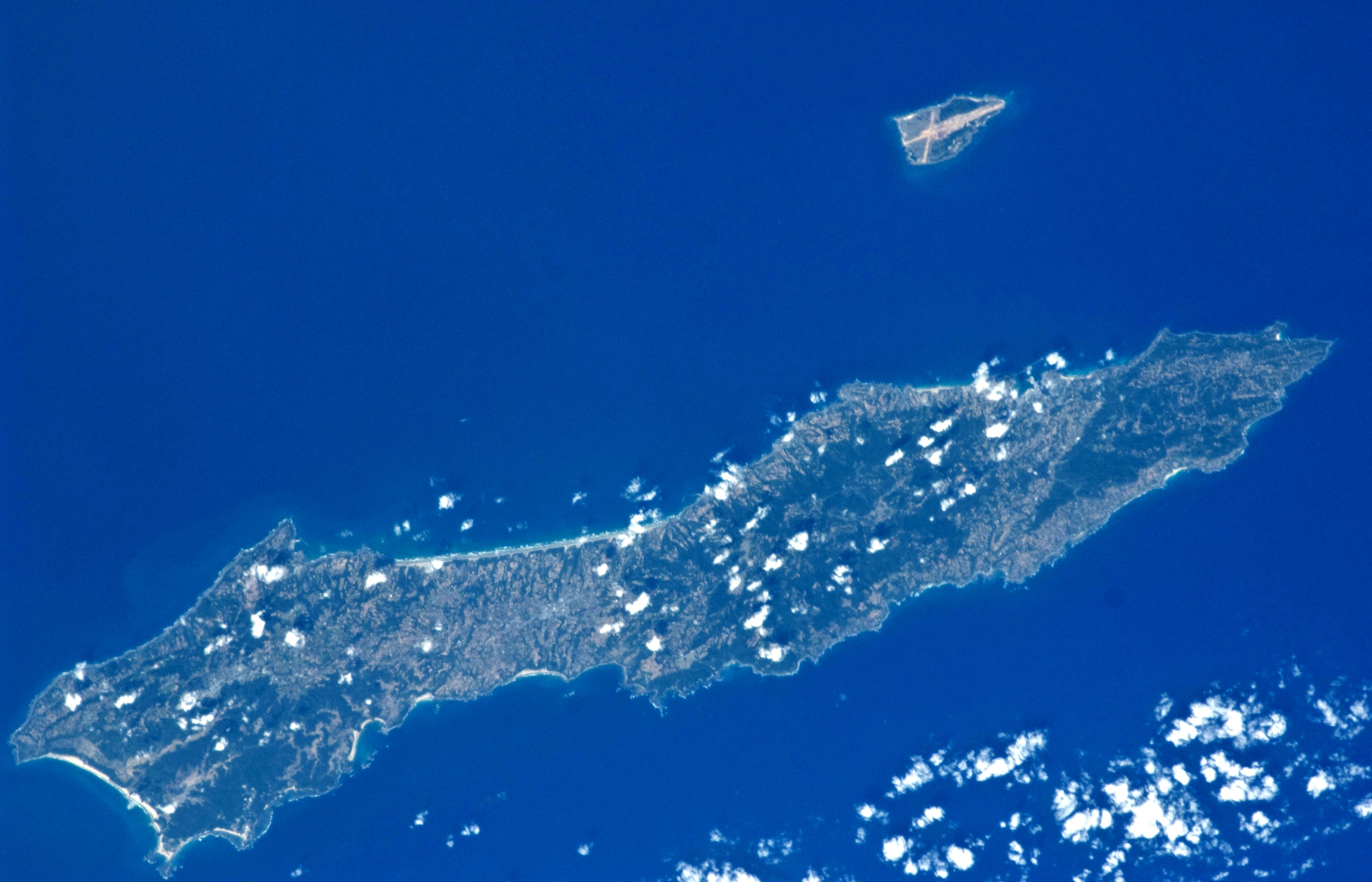
The game is set on Tanegashima island.

Robotics;Notes DaSH is a visual novel, and is a sequel to Robotics;Notes, following the former members of the robotics club, including Kaito Yashio and Akiho Senomiya who now have graduated high school and are exploring their dreams. The game includes several crossover elements from other games in the Science Adventure series, including the Steins;Gate characters Itaru "Daru" Hashida and Nae Tennouji, the former of which is described as having a major role. The game is set on Tanegashima island in 2020, half a year after the events of Robotics;Notes and about ten years after Steins;Gate. Tanegashima is preparing for a summer festival, and JAXA (Japan Aerospace Exploration Agency) is simultaneously preparing for a space mission.

In the game, the player takes the role of Kaito, and chooses destinations in the mobile app Deluoode Map on the in-game personal digital assistant PokeCom to cause the story to branch into different directions. In addition to Kaito, the game also features sequences seen from other characters' perspectives.

== Plot ==
In summer 2020 six months after the Tanegashima Robotics Club saved the world from Kō Kimijima's Project Atum, Itaru "Daru" Hashida travels to Tanegashima for undisclosed reasons, arriving at the same time as Kaito, who is taking a break from his studies to become an astronaut. Daru is greeted by Nae, who introduces him to Kaito and the rest of the Robotics Club. Akiho, Subaru, Frau, and Junna have volunteered to help run the local Tanegashima Gun Festival, while Airi continues to live as Kaito's adopted sister. However, at the commencement of the festival, Kimijima reappears using artificial delusion technology, challenging the Robotics Club to find all of the Geotags he has scattered around the island before he initiates his plan to take over the world. With the rest of the Robotics Club having their hands full managing the festival, Kaito and Daru are recruited to search for the Geotags and thwart Kimijima's plot.

However, the Robotics Club begin to notice that this current Kimijima seems less malicious than the one they previously dealt with, as he only seems to use his artificial delusions to commit harmless pranks which seem to only make the festival more popular. Once the festival is halfway done, Daru observes the effects of Kimijima's delusions to figure out that Daru's own delusions were unintentionally influencing Kimijima's actions. Kimijima then becomes hostile and attempts to sabotage the festival, but is thwarted when Daru uses his own powerful delusions to "hack" Kimijima's artificial delusion technology, buying enough time for the Robotics Club to track down and shut down the equipment, seemingly getting rid of Kimijima for good.

With Kimijima defeated, Daru and Kaito are free to celebrate the rest of the festival with Nae and the Robotics Club. With Daru's help, Airi, Frau, and Junna are able to overcome their social insecurities, while Subaru finds the courage to make amends with his father over his dream to build robots. Meanwhile, Kaito helps Nae thwart and apprehend an assassin targeting Misaki. He also restarts his relationship with Akiho, after having put it on pause during his studies abroad. With Daru's help, the Robotics Club also rebuilds Gunbuild-2 in time for the final day of the festival, though Kimijima resurfaces in a rebuilt SUMERAGI and attacks. Kai takes control of Gunbuild-2 and supported by artificial delusions provided by Daru, Kai is able to defeat SUMERAGI. Daru then traps Kimijima in a storage device, his true objective this entire time. Daru then returns to Tokyo, where he parts amicably with the Robotics Club. Meanwhile, Misaki is released from the hospital and makes amends with Kaito and Akiho.

Upon returning to Tokyo, Daru receives a warning from his friend Rintaro Okabe, telling him "the worldline trembles." Upon further investigation, Daru realizes that the Kimijima he captured is merely a flawed copy, and the original version of Kimijima is carrying out a series of hacking attacks on supercomputers and infrastructure grids all over the globe, plunging the world into chaos. Daru returns to Tanegashima to consult with the Robotics Club, Sawada, Nae, and Misaki, and they come to conclusion that Kimijima is hijacking the world's supercomputers in an attempt to achieve technological singularity. Daru uncovers evidence that Kimijima has placed himself inside a satellite. The robotics club fights an army of rogue robots to clear a path to JAXA's space communication center, where Daru proceeds to hack the satellite. He introduces a special program called "ANTARES", which permanently neutralizes Kimijima and prevents him from making any more copies of himself.

With the crisis averted, the Robotics Club celebrates, and Daru decides to bring his fellow Lab Members to Tanegashima in the future to meet them.

== Development ==
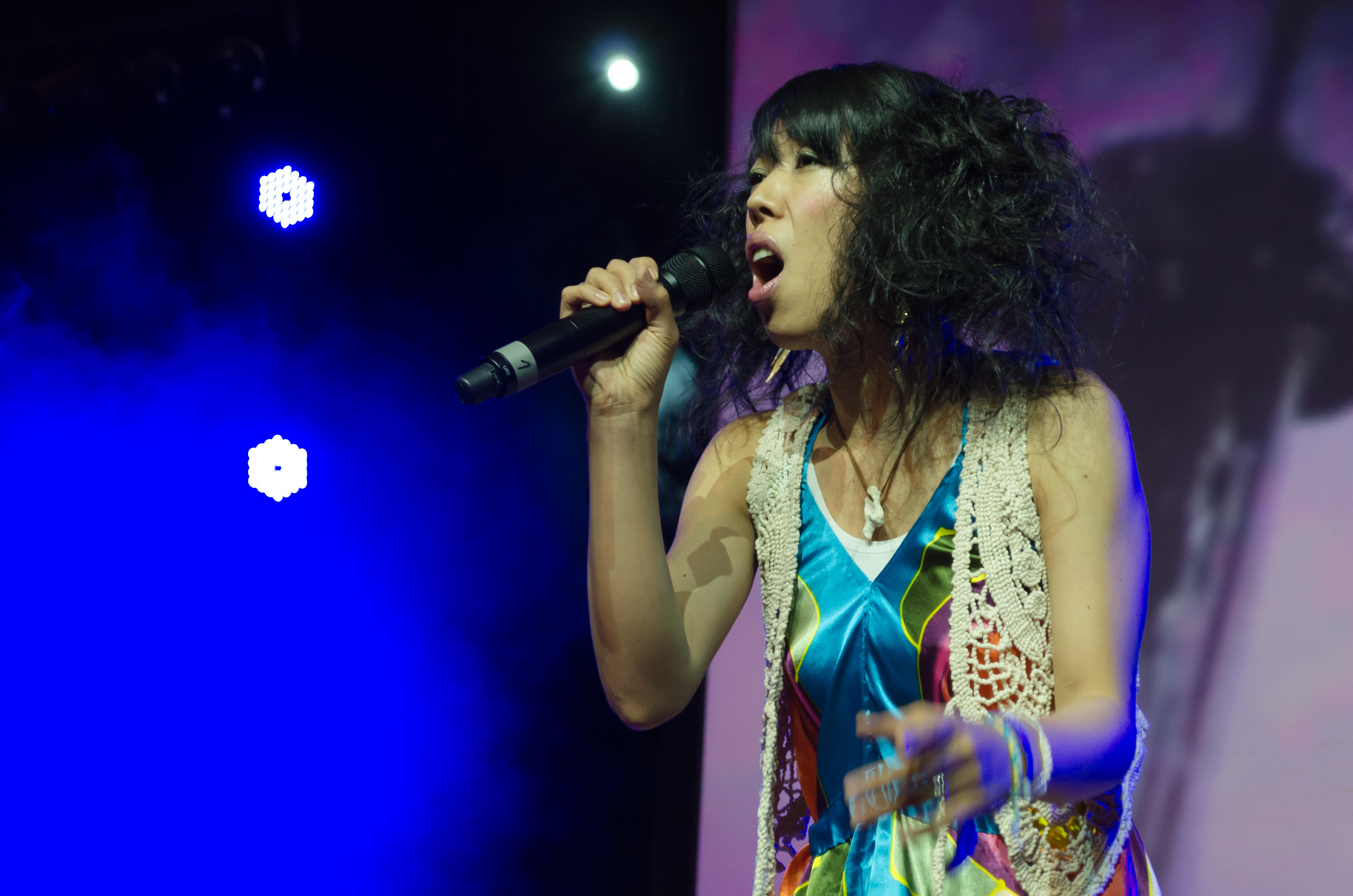
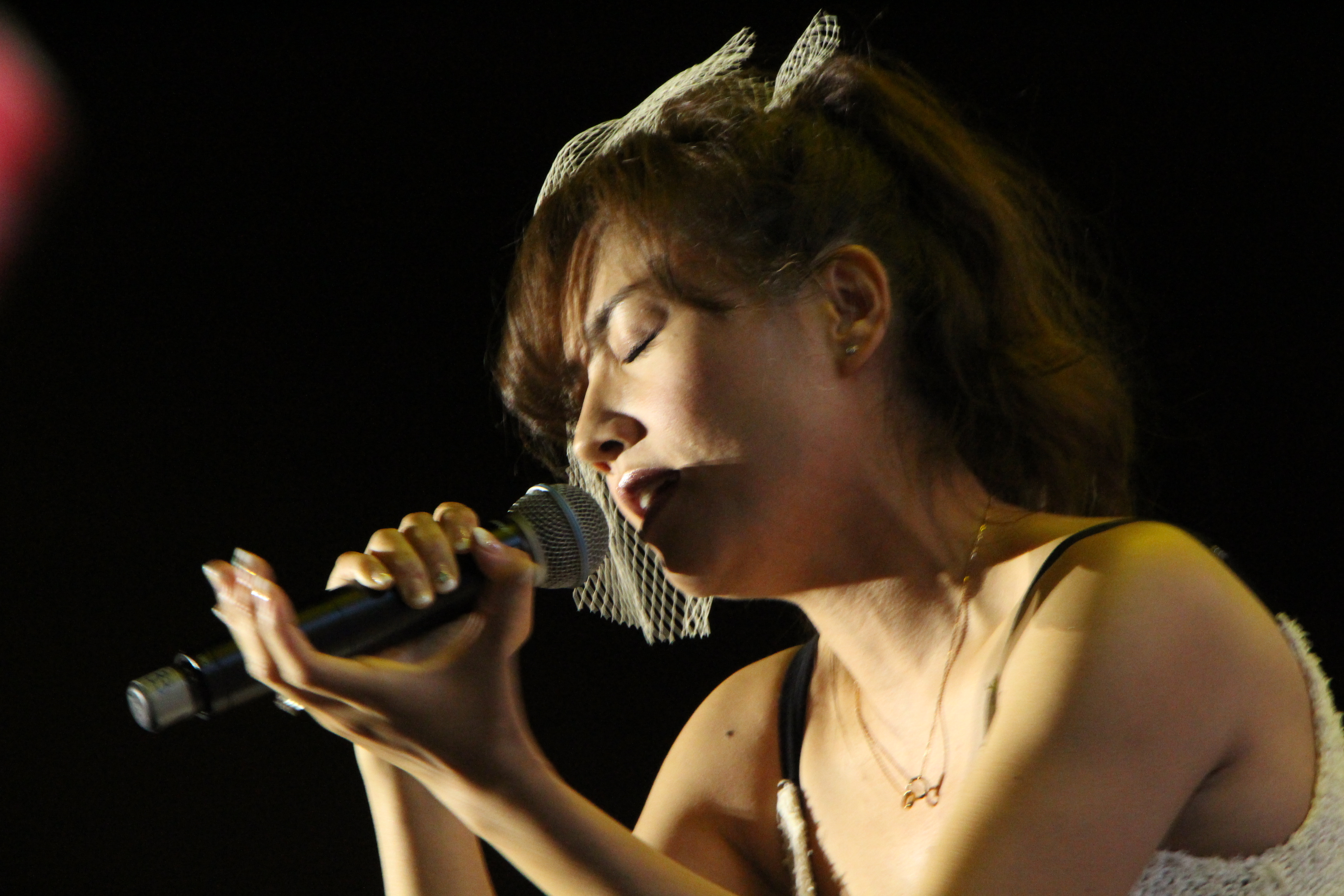
Kanako Itō (top) and Yumi Matsuzawa (bottom) performed the ending themes.

Robotics;Notes DaSH was developed by Mages, and was written by Toru Yasumoto and Chiyomaru Shikura and produced by Tatsuya Matsubara. The characters were designed by Tomonori Fukuda, the mechanical designs were handled by Makoto Ishiwata from Polygon Bangcho and Yukihiro Matsuo, and the music was composed by Takeshi Abo. The game's opening theme, "Avant Story", was written by Shikura and performed by Zwei; one of the ending themes, "Konna Boku Demo" (こんな僕でも), was performed by Kanako Itō, and the other, "Trust", was performed by Yumi Matsuzawa. The game also features the songs "Tu Ru Tu Ru Dance" by Enako, and "Anubis", which was written by Shikura and performed by Konomi Suzuki.

The game was announced at the Chiyo-ST Live 2017 Genesis event in Tokyo in May 2017, and a trailer was shown at Tokyo Game Show 2017. The game was published by 5pb. in Japan for PlayStation 4 and Nintendo Switch on January 31, 2019, following two delays from early 2018 and November 22, 2018.

In Japan, the game was in addition to the standard release also made available in a bundle with Robotics;Notes Elite HD, an updated version of the original Robotics;Notes game. An English localization by Spike Chunsoft, announced at Anime Expo 2019, is planned to be published bundled with Elite HD on PlayStation 4 and Nintendo Switch on October 13, 2020, in North America and on October 16 in Europe, and as a stand-alone, world-wide release for Windows on October 13, 2020.

A single containing "Avant Story" and an audio drama monologue featuring Yoshino Nanjō as Akiho Senomiya was released on December 26, 2018, and the complete Robotics;Notes DaSH Original Soundtrack album on February 13, 2019.

== Reception ==
Reception

Review scores
Publication	Score
Famitsu	31/40
Anime News Network	B−

During its debut week in Japan, Media Create's and Famitsu's weekly sales charts respectively reported 3,943 (19th rank) and 4,360 (17th rank) physical copies sold for PlayStation 4; the Nintendo Switch version sold 2,834 physical copies and ranked 24th according to Famitsu, but did not appear on Media Create's top 20 chart. Famitsu also reported a sell-through rate of about 60% for both versions. Neither Famitsu nor Media Create revealed sales numbers for the DaSH and Elite HD bundles for PlayStation 4 and Nintendo Switch, although Media Create listed both as ranking higher than the Nintendo Switch stand-alone version of DaSH.

Famitsu's writers enjoyed the game, saying that they liked the comedic writing, the characters' growth, and the focus on each robotics club member, as well as the depiction of Tanegashiman culture. The graphics and visuals were also well received, with praise given to the 3D characters' animations and the background artwork. They considered the game appealing to fans of Steins;Gate and of the Science Adventure series in general, due to things like Daru's heavy involvement in the story.
