= Steins;Gate: Linear Bounded Phenogram =

Japanese visual novel game

- English cover art
- Developer: 5pb.
- Publishers: JP: 5pb.; WW: Spike Chunsoft
- Producer: Tatsuya Matsubara
- Artist: Huke
- Writer: Naotaka Hayashi
- Composer: Takeshi Abo
- Series: Science Adventure
- Platforms: PlayStation 3, Xbox 360, PlayStation Vita, iOS, PlayStation 4, Microsoft Windows, Nintendo Switch
- Release: April 25, 2013: PlayStation 3, Xbox 360; JP: April 25, 2013 PlayStation Vita; JP: November 28, 2013 iOS; JP: August 19, 2014 PlayStation 4; JP: September 20, 2018; WW: February 19, 2019 Microsoft Windows; WW: February 19, 2019 Nintendo Switch; JP: March 20, 2019
- Genre: Visual novel
- Mode: Single-player

Steins;Gate: Linear Bounded Phenogram (Note: Steins;Gate: Senkei Kōsoku no Phenogram (Japanese: シュタインズ・ゲート 線形拘束のフェノグラム, Hepburn: Shutainzu Gēto: Senkei Kōsoku no Fenoguramu)) is a visual novel video game developed and published by 5pb. for PlayStation 3, Xbox 360, and PlayStation Vita in 2013, and later ported to iOS, Nintendo Switch, PlayStation 4, and Microsoft Windows; the PlayStation 4 and Windows versions were released internationally by Spike Chunsoft in 2019. The game is part of the Science Adventure series, and a spin-off from the 2009 game Steins;Gate. It consists of ten side stories set in different realities, and follow different Steins;Gate characters. Unlike previous entries in the Steins;Gate series, the game is nearly devoid of interactive narrative.

The game was produced by Tatsuya Matsubara, with character design by Huke. As 5pb.'s Chiyomaru Shikura felt that the Steins;Gate world had been fully conceived, he allowed a group of other writers to create the game's story to bring new ideas to the series. Among these were Naotaka Hayashi, who had worked on previous Science Adventure titles and supervised the story, and Kotaro Uchikoshi, whose writing for the game was influenced by the anime series Code Geass.

== Gameplay ==
Linear Bounded Phenogram is a visual novel in which the player advances through text and dialogue to read through several short stories; unlike previous entries in the Steins;Gate series, which let the player affect the flow of the story by sending specific messages from the protagonist's phone, the plot of the individual chapters in Steins;Gate: Linear Bounded Phenogram is not influenced by player input, barring the exchange of different e-mail messages with other characters. In the iPhone version of the game, the player picks up and puts down the in-game phone by holding the phone they are playing on vertically or horizontally, respectively.

== Synopsis ==
Linear Bounded Phenogram is a spin-off from Steins;Gate, consisting of ten side stories set in different realities, some of which are similar to the one in the original game, and some which are very different. Two of the stories follow Rintaro Okabe – the player character in the original Steins;Gate – while the rest follow other characters.

== Production ==
=== Development ===
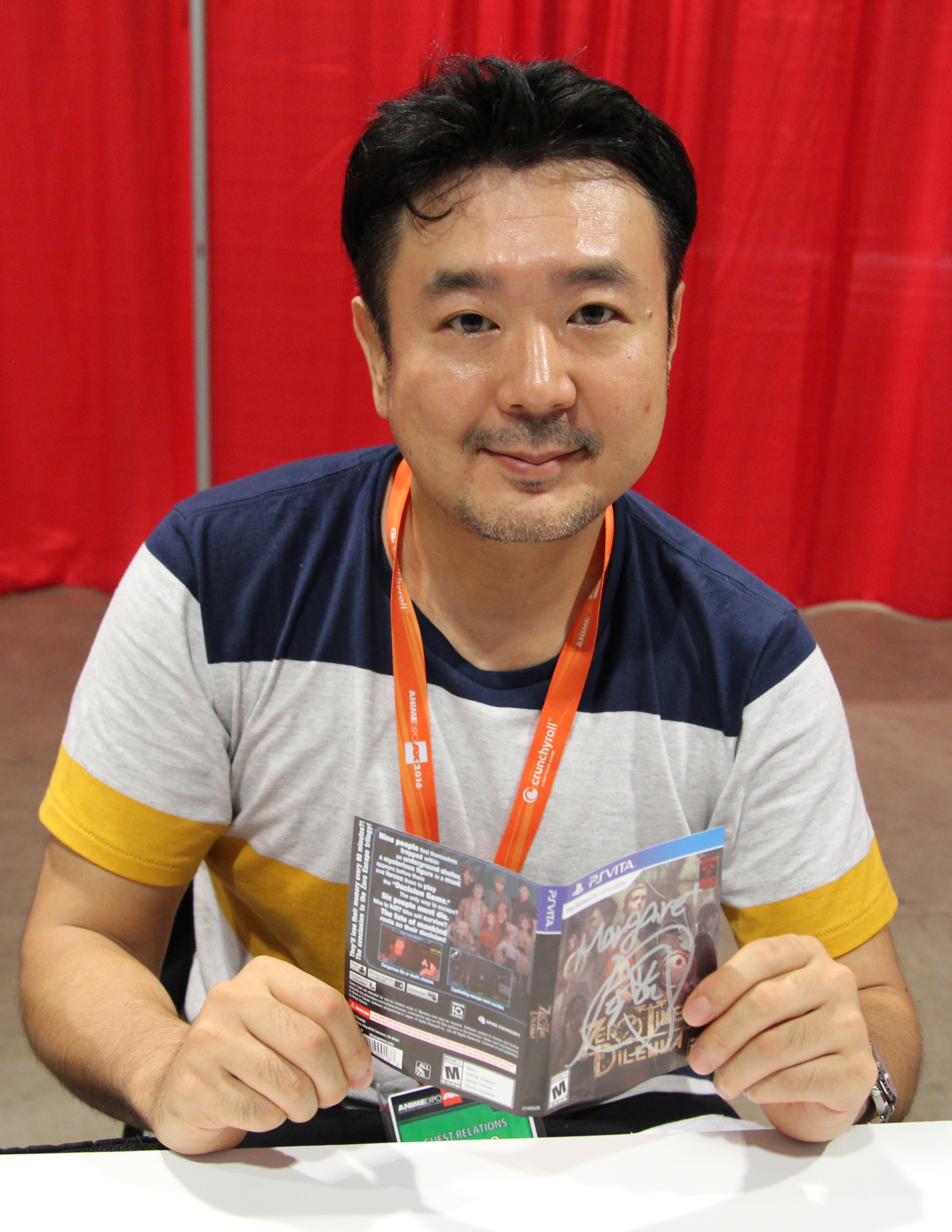
Kotaro Uchikoshi wrote the scenario "Abduction Across Three Worlds".

Linear Bounded Phenogram was developed by 5pb., and was produced by Tatsuya Matsubara, with character designs by Huke. 5pb.'s CEO Chiyomaru Shikura wrote the game's theme song, "Phenogram", which was performed by Ayane. The project started with the concept of a Steins;Gate spin-off focusing on each character individually, with a more serious tone than the earlier spin-off Steins;Gate: My Darling's Embrace. Unlike the original Steins;Gate, where Shikura came up with the story himself, the story of Linear Bounded Phenogram was crafted by a group of writers: The script was written and supervised by Science Adventure series regular Naotaka Hayashi together with guest writers Baio Shimokura, Masahiro Yokotani, Kiyomune Miwa, Teru Arai, Shogo Sakamoto, Masashi Kigasawa, Toru Yasumoto, Kougetsu Mikaduki, Keiji Akatsuki, and Kotaro Uchikoshi, who each wrote one scenario.

The decision to let new writers work on the game came from when Shikura was working on the anime adaptation of Steins;Gate, and he realized that the game's world was already fully conceived, which meant that he could let other writers who understand the world work on Steins;Gate projects, bringing new ideas into it. Matsubara contacted people who had been involved with different Steins;Gate media and were knowledgeable on the series, and the writers themselves picked which of the main characters they wanted to write about on a first-come-first-served basis. Matsubara said that this resulted in them getting to work on characters they liked and were good at portraying.

Uchikoshi did not work sequentially on his scenario, "Abduction Across Three Worlds", instead choosing to write in a disordered style, going back and forth, writing different parts in parallel. A large influence on his scenario was the anime series Code Geass (2006–2007), with the character Lelouch Lamperouge influencing Okabe's "wannabe bad guy" characterization.

=== Release ===
The game was first announced in November 2012 for an early 2013 release, and was released for the PlayStation 3 and the Xbox 360 on April 25, 2013. A PlayStation Vita version followed later in the same year, on November 28. While the story remains unchanged, some optimization of the game was done for the PlayStation Vita release. It was additionally released for iOS devices on August 19, 2014, and the Xbox 360 version became playable on Xbox One through backward compatibility on May 19, 2017, along with the original Steins;Gate and the spin-off Steins;Gate: My Darling's Embrace.

An HD remaster for the PlayStation 4 was released in a bundle with first-print copies of the Japanese PlayStation 4 and PlayStation Vita versions of the game Steins;Gate Elite on September 20, 2018; the HD remaster was also published internationally by Spike Chunsoft as part of their Microsoft Windows and PlayStation 4 releases of Steins;Gate Elite on February 19, 2019. The game was also released for the Nintendo Switch as part of the collection Steins;Gate: Divergencies Assort along with Steins;Gate 0 and Steins;Gate: My Darling's Embrace on March 20, 2019 in Japan.

In Japan, the game was made available in two limited editions: one for the PlayStation 3 and Xbox 360 versions, which includes a replica of Okabe's cell phone, and one for the PlayStation Vita version, which includes a DVD with a round-table discussion with the voice actors, and a set of Steins;Gate-themed bandages.

== Reception ==
Reception

Review score
Publication	Score
Famitsu	34/40

The game has received widespread critical acclaim from multiple publications, who and enjoyed the use of multiple viewpoints in the story. Richard Eisenbeis at Kotaku said that the game, like other Steins;Gate games, has excellent art. He found it interesting to follow characters other than Okabe and seeing their thoughts, and enjoyed how they received a lot of character development. Famitsu's writers also enjoyed the multiple viewpoints, particularly that of the character Mayuri Shiina, and gave the game their "Gold Hall of Fame" award. Patrick Gann of RPGFan enjoyed the game's opening themes, particularly "Phetaritette Encounter", the opening for the PlayStation Vita version, which he said was the most musically interesting piece by Ayane in the music album The Sound of Steins;Gate Complete. During the game's debut week, the PlayStation 3 and Xbox 360 versions were the fifth and sixteenth best selling games in Japan with 34,292 and 8,821 copies sold, respectively; the Xbox 360 version dropped off the top 20 chart the following week, while the PlayStation 3 version dropped to nineteenth place, selling an additional 5,144 copies for a grand total of 48,257 copies sold. In December 2013, Amazon.co.jp reported that the standard and limited editions of Steins;Gate Phenogram were their ninth and twentieth best selling Xbox 360 games of the year, respectively.
