= Anonymous;Code =

- Promotional art
- Developers: Mages; Chiyomaru Studio
- Publishers: JP: Mages; WW: Spike Chunsoft
- Director: Toshihiko Kajioka
- Producer: Tatsuya Matsubara
- Writers: Chiyomaru Shikura; Naotaka Hayashi; Ayano Suehiro; Tsukasa Tsuchiya
- Composer: Takeshi Abo
- Series: Science Adventure
- Platforms: Nintendo Switch; PlayStation 4; Windows
- Release: Nintendo Switch, PS4: JP: July 28, 2022; WW: September 8, 2023; Windows: WW: September 8, 2023
- Genres: Visual novel, Game of Life
- Mode: Single-player

Anonymous;Code is a 2022 visual novel video game developed by Mages and Chiyomaru Studio, and is the sixth mainline entry in the Science Adventure series. Along with being a visual novel, it also has a fully working implementation of Conway's Game of Life built in that can be accessed via the in-game menu. Following a series of delays, the game was released for PlayStation 4 and Nintendo Switch on July 28, 2022 in Japan. A western English release, published by Spike Chunsoft, was announced in July 2022 with a Windows port, and released on September 8, 2023.

== Plot ==
=== Setting ===
The game takes place in the year 2037, one year after the disastrous "Sad Morning" event which occurred on February 6, 2036. Due to date overflow errors caused by the Year 2036 Problem, a network of orbital laser satellites called SA4D (Strategic Attack For Defense) went out of control and attacked the capital cities of numerous countries around the world, causing significant chaos, destruction and death. Tokyo in particular suffered greatly, with the numerous satellite laser hits creating "Craters" all over the city. As a result, there are concerns that a similar disaster, the Year 2038 Problem, will occur.

Meanwhile, technology has progressed significantly, with wearable computers called BMIs allowing people to seamlessly connect to the internet. Quantum computing has also become commonplace, with international laws put in place to prevent the creation of Earth Simulators. However, that does not stop groups from researching them in secret. One such simulator is developed by child prodigy Asuma Soga at the Gai Institution, dubbed GAIA. GAIA can not only reconstruct or simulate events that happened in the past or present, but can also predict future events, allowing whoever controls it to influence the future.

The story follows Pollon Takaoka, a young 16-year-old hacker who lost his father during Sad Morning. He makes a living taking jobs with his friends in the hacker circle Nakano Symphonies. He also comes into possession of a mysterious power he dubs "Save & Load", which allows him to set "save points" in time and travel back to them by "loading" them like a game. However, any saves made after the save he loads are deleted and lost, and saves he loads too far back in time put too much strain on his brain, giving him an illness where he repeatedly goes comatose and is unable to stop tragic events from happening. So he has to use his new power very carefully and avoid overusing it, but when used properly, he has miraculous abilities to predict the future and alter future events, something someone with an Earth Simulator can also do, putting him in competition with those who have access to Earth Simulators in trying to predict and influence future events.

Pollon initially just has Cross and Wind as friends to help him out, but gradually makes more friends and allies such as Tengen Ozutani (a private detective and former astronaut), Nonoka Hosho (a young girl and child prodigy who invents many gadgets), Liddie Kumar (a brilliant mathematician and online influencer), Rosario Rossellini (a Vatican assassin and skilled fighter who is fiercely loyal to Momo), and the Cyber Force Dolls (a trio of young police officers who solve cybercrimes and are also an idol group).

=== Synopsis ===
One night, Pollon comes across a teenage girl called "Momo Aizaki" being abducted by soldiers from the mysterious Special Forces Group led by Graham Kingley. He attempts to intervene and save her, but fails, which is when a mysterious app is loaded by the player, who Pollon nicknames "Anon", onto his BMI, giving him the "Save & Load" power and allowing him to travel back in time and use his future knowledge to save Momo and evade her Special Forces Group pursuers, who the Japanese Ministry of Defense deployed under orders from The Vatican. Asuma takes a personal interest in the failed operation, as it contradicts GAIA's predictions.

After reaching safety, Momo reveals to Pollon that she traveled to Japan to search for a man named Kent Korihisa, who is the criminal hacker Cicada 3301 infamous for issuing "quests" to other hackers to stop his crimes. She explains that Kent was forced to help the Vatican develop their own Earth Simulator, Necro Pilgrimage, and accidentally uncovered the real Third Secret of Fátima, which predicted that the world will end on January 19, 2038. With this revelation, Pollon and his friends agree to help Momo search for Kent.

As they solve the various quests Cicada sets out, it comes to light that Momo is actually a clone of Fátima prophecy recipient Lúcia Santos. Meanwhile, Holy Office 513, an extremist doomsday cult within the Vatican that seeks to fulfill the Third Prophecy, attempts to recapture Momo. But Pollon is able to thwart them and their pyrokinetic agent Davide Iesue with help from Rosario Rosellini, a former Holy Office 513 agent who is actually on Momo's side and trying to help save the world. Another foe Pollon faces when trying to solve the quests is JUNO, Kent Korihisa's obsessive yandere sister who has the power of quantum teleportation.

Cicada's quests become increasingly difficult. The first one involves saving a hijacked airplane whose autopilot control systems were hacked, the second involves stopping a 51% attack using proof of stake on the blockchain of Tokyo Mitsubishi Bank, and the third involves rescuing a group of people whose BMIs were hacked who are standing on top of a tall building, about to jump off. After solving Cicada's third quest, Pollon is then contacted by Cicada himself, who is actually an AI version of Kent existing in the Amadeus System since the real Kent died during the Sad Morning. Kent warns Pollon to save Asuma's mother Miori, whose death will trigger him to end the world, and JUNO becomes a reluctant ally of Pollon because of her devotion to Kent. Meanwhile, the Holy Office 513 leader Felino Arcana is furious at Pollon for ruining her plans, and begins to accelerate her own, doing unspeakable acts such as bringing Davide Iesue back from the dead as a zombie, although thankfully Rosario is able to defeat Davide a second time.

A week later, the Holy Office 513 leaks the existence of GAIA to the public, creating a national scandal. Meanwhile, Pollon and Momo get help from JUNO to infiltrate the Gai Institution to secure Miori's safety, right as the Special Forces Group is sent to raid the facility by the Japanese government. Asuma reluctantly accepts Pollon's help, and Pollon learns that he was abused by both his parents, with his father committing suicide and Miori attempting to, resulting in a comatose state. Asuma put Miori in a secure location in the facility, but the Holy Office 513 had already made preparations to have her killed and trigger Asuma's desire to end the world. A 3-way conflict erupts at the Gai Institution between Pollon and his friends, the Special Forces Group, and the Holy Office 513, with the SFG trying to assassinate Asuma, the Holy Office 513 trying to assassinate Miori, and Pollon and his friends trying to avoid having either of them get killed. However, no matter how many times Pollon tries, Miori is killed, and Asuma manifests godlike powers, becoming an unstoppable force of mass destruction fueled by his nihilism. Kent explains the supernatural phenomena they are witnessing is due to their world being a simulation itself, existing within a GAIA of a higher "world layer" looking for a solution for the Year 2038 Problem. The reason Asuma has such powers is because he is synchronized with the Asuma in a higher world layer, giving him complete control over the current layer.

In his grief, Asuma sends an asteroid to collide with Earth, reasoning their world will be destroyed by the Year 2038 Problem anyway even if he doesn't destroy the Earth, and he wishes to force everyone to give up all hope and accept the end of the world. Asuma also deletes Kent for being a potential threat to him. Many people around the world give up hope and there are countless suicides and crimes as the world descends into chaos. Despite this, Pollon and his friends manage to destroy the asteroid using remnants of the SA4D system, but have no answer for the Year 2038 Problem. Momo decides to carry on Kent's idea to create a "world line collapse" by forcing a reset of their own world layer, which will result in all world layers synchronizing with the layers that already discovered a solution to the Year 2038 Problem. Pollon distracts Asuma while his friends smuggle Momo into the Vatican so she can directly connect to Necro Pilgrimage and force the world reset. Several of Pollon's allies are killed battling both Asuma and Holy Office 513, but they are ultimately victorious, allowing Momo to carry out her plan.

Game of Life pattern on Momo's face

Pollon doesn't accept the fact that Momo will have to sacrifice herself, since she doesn't exist in any other world layers and will be erased completely by the world reset. This is because Momo is an artificial lifeform with an artificial brain, analogous to those in the Game of Life, specifically created by the Earth Simulators in different world layers working together to try to solve the Year 2038 Problem. The miracle of Momo's incarnation into a living human body only happened in the one world layer where the Earth Simulators predicted the highest chance of success of solving the Year 2038 Problem, so resetting all the world layers would delete her existence.

Just before the world line collapse occurs, Pollon Loads the very first save Anon made for him before he met Momo. Pollon doesn't suffer any ill health effects from loading so far back due to the save being made by Anon and not himself. Using his future knowledge, Pollon solves the quests in record time and neutralizes the Holy Office 513 before they can enact their plans. Pollon then consults with Kent on ways to save Momo from the reset, and Kent suggests directly contacting Anon through the Black Knight satellite. The Amadeus System version of Kurisu Makise helps Pollon by creating a backup of Momo that can be activated after the reset. Pollon then goes to a hidden chamber in the completed Sagrada Família in Barcelona, Spain, where he sends Momo's backup data to Anon through the Black Knight so Anon can carry her data over to the new world.

Momo's data is stored using the "galaxy" from the Game of Life, the symbol that appears as a cyan-colored AR tattoo on the left cheek of her face when she is viewed through BMI. Anon has to do this by drawing the symbol into the in-game menu, as this symbol is used by the Black Knight satellite to identify Momo's data for the backup. After the world is reset, a restored Momo meets with Pollon, and while Momo remembers everything that happened, Pollon has no memory of her due to the reset. Despite this, Momo still reaches out to Pollon and asks to be his friend.

== Development ==
Anonymous;Code was developed by Chiyomaru Studio and Mages and was written by Naotaka Hayashi, Ayano Suehiro, and Tsukasa Tsuchiya. Alongside Occultic;Nine, it was initially announced as part of the Science Visual Novel series, intended to be separate from the developers' Science Adventure series. However, both games were later incorporated into the Science Adventure series, with Occultic;Nine and Anonymous;Code serving as the fifth and sixth main entries in the franchise respectively. In contrast with the concept of infinitely expanding horizontal "world lines" used in Chiyomaru Shikura's Science Adventure game Steins;Gate, Anonymous;Code uses the concept of infinitely expanding vertical "world layers", with the main character being able to manipulate layers below his, and is themed around hacking. According to Shikura, the game's role is in part resolving unanswered questions from the Science Adventure series.

Shikura stated that he initially wanted to increase the game's immersion by applying a unique artwork to every scene and using full animation during major events. However, he realised the game would need at least 3000 pieces of artwork (in contrast to the usual 100 found in visual novels), not counting the costs to produce the animations, and thus discarded this idea. His research on how to lower the costs of an immersive visual novel led him to consider reusing old animation, developing Steins;Gate Elite from this idea.

== Release ==
The game was released for the PlayStation 4 and Nintendo Switch in Japan on July 28, 2022, after numerous delays since 2016. A PlayStation Vita version was initially announced, but was cancelled due to the system's discontinuation. A PlayStation 5 version has been teased in the past. An official English language localization was announced on July 2, 2022 and released by Spike Chunsoft worldwide on September 8, 2023 for PlayStation 4, Nintendo Switch and Windows.

== Reception ==
George Yang of RPG Site noted that Anonymous;Code grabbed his attention in a way that he hasn't seen since Steins;Gate. Matthew Sainsbury of Digitally Downloaded called Anonymous;Code a perfect, thought provoking, intelligent “page turner” to end the series on, praising the thematic depth of the narrative, while Wes Playfair of NookGaming was positive about the game overall, but stated that it lacks the depth and maturity of earlier Science Adventure games. Oliver Shellding of WayTooManyGames was critical of the saving and loading mechanic, but lauded the game overall, noting: "If a visual novel can cause you to question existence, it's doing something right."
