= Science Adventure =

Japanese video game series and multimedia franchises

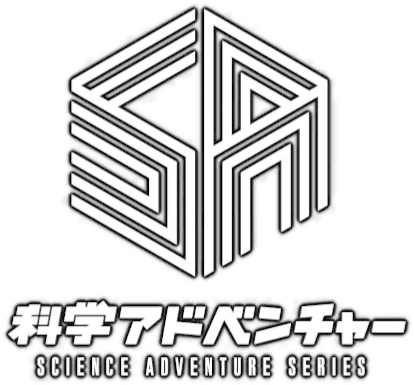
- Logo
- Genre: Visual novel
- Developers: Nitroplus; Mages
- Publishers: Nitroplus; Mages
- Creator: Chiyomaru Shikura
- Platforms: Windows, Xbox 360, PlayStation 3, PlayStation Portable, PlayStation Vita, iOS, Android, PlayStation 4, Nintendo Switch
- Original release: 2008–2010 (Nitroplus × Mages); 2011–present (Mages)
- First release: Chaos;Head; April 25, 2008
- Latest release: Anonymous;Code; July 28, 2022

Science Adventure, (Note: Japanese: 科学アドベンチャー, Hepburn: Kagaku Adobenchā) commonly shortened to SciADV, is a video game series and media franchise consisting of interconnected science fiction stories created by Mages, (Note: Went by "5pb." until 2011.) initially in collaboration with Nitroplus. The main entries mostly take the form of visual novel video games.

The series currently consists of six mainline entries: the first entry of the series, 2008's Chaos;Head, is followed by Steins;Gate, Robotics;Notes, Chaos;Child, Occultic;Nine, Anonymous;Code, as well as the upcoming Steins;???. The series also includes several spin-off games based on Chaos;Head, Steins;Gate, Robotics;Notes, and Chaos;Child, as well as spin-offs in other mediums including anime, manga, light novels, audio dramas, and stage plays. All main entries except Anonymous;Code have received anime adaptations.

The main entries and their spin-offs all take place in the same fictional universe, focusing on several different science fiction themes. Chaos;Head and Chaos;Child focus on perception, Steins;Gate focuses on time travel and science, Robotics;Notes focuses on robotics and augmented reality, and Anonymous;Code focuses on hacking, time leaping, simulated reality among concepts from other games in the franchise. The player can affect the course of the story by making certain choices: in Chaos;Head and Chaos;Child this is done by choosing what kind of delusions the player characters experience. The choices in the Steins;Gate games and Robotics;Notes are made via messages set by the player via an in-game cell phone and tablet computer, respectively. The choices in Anonymous;Code are made using the save/load ability.

The series is created and planned by Chiyomaru Shikura, founder of Mages and Chiyomaru Studio, composed by Takeshi Abo and Zizz Studio, written by Chiyomaru Shikura, Naotaka Hayashi along with other writers, and features character designs by artists including Mutsumi Sasaki, Huke, and Tomonori Fukuda. The developers aimed to make the series set within reality, as Shikura felt it made it more relatable and believable. The series has been commercially and critically successful both in Japan and internationally, far exceeding sales expectations for the genre and establishing Mages (previously 5pb.) as a game developer.

The series is published by Mages and Nitroplus in Japan, and by JAST USA, PQube, Mages, and Spike Chunsoft internationally.

== Main entries ==
Release timeline
2008	Chaos;Head
2009	Chaos;Head Noah
2009	Steins;Gate
2010	Chaos;Head Love Chu Chu!
2011	Steins;Gate: My Darling's Embrace
2011	Steins;Gate: Octet of Shifting Space
2012	Robotics;Notes
2013	Steins;Gate: Linear Bounded Phenogram
2014	Robotics;Notes Elite
2014	Occultic;Nine (light novel)
2014	Chaos;Child
2015	Steins;Gate 0
2016
2017	Chaos;Child Love Chu Chu!
2017	Occultic;Nine (visual novel)
2018	Steins;Gate Elite
2018	8-bit ADV Steins;Gate
2019	Robotics;Notes DaSH
2020
2021
2022	Anonymous;Code
2023
2024
2025
2026	Steins;Gate Re:Boot
TBA	Steins;???

The Science Adventure series consists of six core entries, along with a seventh in development. Some of the games have received updated editions with added content, and there are compilations collecting several games, such as Chaos;Head Dual (collecting both Chaos;Head games) and Steins;Gate: Divergencies Assort (collecting Steins;Gate 0, Darling of Loving Vows, and Linear Bounded Phenogram).

The main entries are as follows:

- Chaos;Head is the first entry in the series. It was originally released as a visual novel in 2008; a director's cut version of the game, Chaos;Head Noah, was released in 2009. The game follows Takumi, a shut-in otaku who unwillingly becomes caught up in a series of brutal murders dubbed the "New Generation Madness."
- Steins;Gate is the second entry in the series. It was originally released as a visual novel in 2009. A later release replacing the artwork with visuals from and inspired by the anime adaptation, Steins;Gate Elite, was released in 2018. The game follows Okabe, who accidentally invents time travel; he and his friends use this to send emails into the past, altering the present. A remake of the original visual novel, titled Re:Boot, has released in August 2026 with new artwork and story additions.
- Robotics;Notes is the third entry in the series. It was originally released as a visual novel in 2012; an updated version, Robotics;Notes Elite, was released in 2014. The game follows Kaito and Akiho, founding members of a high school robotics club who are trying to build a giant robot; meanwhile, they uncover a large-scale conspiracy.
- Chaos;Child is the fourth entry in the series. It was originally released as a visual novel in 2014. It is a thematic sequel to Chaos;Head, and follows Takuru, the president of the high school newspaper club, attempting to uncover the truth behind a new series of brutal deaths occurring in Shibuya.
- Occultic;Nine is the fifth entry in the series. Unlike the other main entries, it was originally a light novel series, initially made to be separate from Science Adventure. It started in 2014, but has been on an indefinite hiatus. It was adapted into a manga series, anime series, and visual novel, each with separate story additions. The story follows Yuta, who runs the occult blog Kirikiri Basara.
- Anonymous;Code is the sixth entry in the series. It was released as a visual novel in 2022. The game follows a young hacker named Pollon, who discovers he has a mysterious ability allowing him to "save and load."
- Steins;??? (name subject to change) is planned to be the seventh entry in the series. It will be a thematic sequel, described by Mages as being to Steins;Gate what Chaos;Child is to Chaos;Head.

== Side entries ==
The series contains eight spin-off games: one based on Chaos;Head, five based on Steins;Gate, one based on Robotics;Notes, and one based on Chaos;Child. It also contains several more side entries spanning several different mediums other than visual novels, such as manga, drama CDs, short stories, and novels.

=== Chaos;Head ===
- Chaos;Head -Blue Complex- is a two-volume manga series that serialized from 2008 to 2009. It is an adaptation of the events from the original Chaos;Head visual novel, shown from the perspective of the original game's character Aoi Sena.
- The Parallel Bootleg is a drama CD released by Nitroplus in December 2008. It is a spin-off about an ominous creature that appears in Shibuya, whose powers and intentions are unknown.
- Chaos;Head H is a single-volume manga that was released in March 2009. It is a romantic comedy retelling of Chaos;Head's story.
- Delusion of Zero is a short story that came exclusively with the Chaos;Head Audio Series Complete Box, which released in August 2009. It is a prologue to the main Chaos;Head visual novel, set in another character's perspective. It is meant to be read after finishing the main Chaos;Head story.
- Chaos;Head Love Chu Chu! was originally released for the Xbox 360 in 2010, and later ported to PlayStation Portable, PlayStation 3, and PlayStation Vita. It is a romantic comedy spin-off and direct sequel to Chaos;Head Noah. A three-volume manga adaptation was released from 2011 to 2012.

=== Steins;Gate ===
- Steins;Gate: My Darling's Embrace was originally released for Xbox 360 in 2011, and later ported to PlayStation Portable, PlayStation 3, PlayStation Vita, iOS, Nintendo Switch, PlayStation 4, and Microsoft Windows. It is a romance-themed "what if?" type of game, where Okabe builds a relationship with Steins;Gate characters.
- Steins;Gate: Octet of Shifting Space (Note: Also known as Steins;Gate 8bit) was released for Microsoft Windows in 2011. It is a sequel to Steins;Gate, presented as a text-based adventure game with 8-bit art, where the player types commands to perform actions.
- Steins;Gate: Linear Bounded Phenogram was originally released for Xbox 360 and PlayStation 3 in 2013, and later ported to PlayStation Vita iOS, PlayStation 4, Microsoft Windows, and Nintendo Switch. It is a collection of eleven side stories set in different world lines, written by several different authors. Two of the stories follow Okabe, while the rest focus on other characters.
- Steins;Gate 0 was originally released for PlayStation 3, PlayStation 4 and PlayStation Vita in 2015, and later ported to Microsoft Windows, Xbox One, and Nintendo Switch. An updated version, Steins;Gate 0 Elite, is in development. It is centered around the events that Okabe experienced in an alternate timeline prior to sending a video D-mail which appears near the conclusion of the original Steins;Gate. An anime series also titled Steins;Gate 0 aired in 2018, which serves as a continuation and finale to the visual novel's story.
- 8-bit ADV Steins;Gate (Note: Known in Japan as Famicolle ADV Steins;Gate) was released for Nintendo Switch in 2018. It is a retelling of Steins;Gate's story in the style of 1980s adventure games for the Famicom. It is actually a real Famicom game, and is run on the Switch with a built-in emulator.

=== Robotics;Notes ===
- The Unpublished Memoirs of Senomiya Misaki is a manga spin-off published in November 2012. It details the past of Misaki Senomiya.
- Robotics;Notes DaSH was released for PlayStation 4 and Nintendo Switch in 2019. The game is a direct sequel to Robotics;Notes and a side entry in the Science Adventure series. It follows the former members of the robotics club several months after the end of the original game. Robotics;Notes DaSH also features Daru from Steins;Gate as its main protagonist, alongside Kaito from Robotics;Notes. Due to this fact, Robotics;Notes DaSH contains many story relevant links to Steins;Gate.

=== Chaos;Child ===
- Far Too Late - Slumbering Fools is a drama CD that came with the PlayStation Limited Edition release of Chaos;Child in June 2015. It focuses on the past of Mio Kunosato.
- Memoirs of a Certain Wrong-Sider is a light novel spin-off that released in December 2015. It presents The Return of the New Generation Madness from the original visual novel from a different character's perspective.
- Chaos;Child ~Children's Collapse~ is a spin-off manga series, made up of three volumes that were released from 2017 to 2019. It serves as a prequel to Chaos;Child, following the life of Mio Kunosato before the events of the main story.
- Chaos;Child Love Chu Chu!! was released for PlayStation 4 and PlayStation Vita in 2017. It is a spin-off from Chaos;Child while being a direct sequel to its events, in which Takuru does not have any interest in the strange events going on around him, and instead spends time with the game's female characters.
- Chaos;Child -Children's Revive- is a light novel that serves as an epilogue for the story of Chaos;Child. It released in March 2017, a day after Chaos;Child Love Chu Chu.

=== Other ===
- Chaos;Gate is a short story crossover between Chaos;Head and Steins;Gate, released in the Nitroplus Complete magazine in September 2009, two weeks before the release of the Steins;Gate visual novel. It takes place during the events of Chaos;Head, and depicts an encounter between Chaos;Head heroine Sena Aoi and Steins;Gate protagonist Rintaro Okabe at Shibuya Station.
- Triptych of an Abrupt Chain is a drama CD for the series that was released in December 2013. It has three tracks, titled Manatsu no Hiru no Caprice, Guuzou Kaimu no Stage, and enigmatic ward, which are drama CDs for Robotics;Notes, Steins;Gate, and Chaos;Head, respectively.
- Tomorrow In The Box is a short story from SCIENCE ADV SERIES 5 Years Jubilee, a book celebrating the series' fifth anniversary, which released in January 2014. It is a crossover between the first three entries in the series, Chaos;Head, Steins;Gate, and Robotics;Notes.

== Common elements ==
In the Steins;Gate games, the player affects the outcome of the story by using the player character's cell phone.

The Science Adventure entries all feature stories in the science fiction genre. They make use of real scientific concepts and theories, but also cross over into fictional territory, using fringe science and urban legends. Chaos;Head and Chaos;Child focus on individuals with the power to alter reality, and discuss topics such as perception, reality, and antimatter, while Steins;Gate focuses on time travel. Robotics;Notes focuses on several technologies such as robotics and augmented reality, as well as borrowing some concepts from the previous two entries. Occultic;Nine focuses on the paranormal. Anonymous;Code has a heavy focus on futuristic computer technology, such as brain-computer interfaces, blockchains, internet of things, and world-simulating supercomputers, as well as reusing and re-contextualizing existing series concepts.

The entries are all set in the same universe, and although presented as self-contained stories, they all make significant use of previously established concepts in the series. They all contain frequent callbacks to previous entries as well, ranging from minor references to major revelations. There is also a higher antagonist shared throughout the entire series, the Committee of 300. The committee, based on the real conspiracy theory, seeks world domination, and is portrayed as very powerful, having control over corporations, politicians, and religions, and being seemingly impossible to beat even with time travel and control over reality.

Most of the main entries are visual novels, in which the player can affect the outcome of the story through choices. In the Chaos;Head games and Chaos;Child, the player does this by controlling what types of delusions the player characters experience: the player can make them experience positive or negative delusions, or alternatively choose to let them stay in reality. Chaos;Child Love Chu Chu!! additionally uses a "yes/no" questionnaire the player character takes in in-game magazines to determine the plot's direction. In Steins;Gate and Steins;Gate 0, the player affects the outcome by using the player character's cell phone: in Steins;Gate, it is done by choosing to respond to certain messages, make phone calls, or taking out the phone at specific times, as this affects what information the player character learns and how he interacts with other characters; and in Steins;Gate 0, it is done by deciding whether or not to answer the phone at certain times. Robotics;Notes works similarly to Steins;Gate, but with the player using a tablet computer and its apps instead of a cell phone. Anonymous;Code has a "Hacking Trigger" where the player can interact with the game at any point to urge the protagonist to use his ability.

== Development ==
Mages cooperated with JAXA to increase the realism; Shikura felt that aiming for reality makes stories more relatable and believable.

The series is planned by Mages's CEO Chiyomaru Shikura, and is developed by Mages, Nitroplus, and Shikura's multimedia concept studio Chiyomaru Studio, the latter of which owns the copyright to the series. Naotaka Hayashi has worked on the series writing, both in the role as a scenario writer and as a scenario supervisor. Recurring character designers include Mutsumi Sasaki (Chaos;Head and Chaos;Child games), Huke (Steins;Gate games), and Tomonori Fukuda (Robotics;Notes games). The games' soundtracks are composed by Takeshi Abo and Zizz Studio.

Shikura aimed for the series to be set in reality, feeling that it made the stories more relatable and believable; he said that he personally found it difficult to "buy into" fantasy, and that he was not convinced that people could get excited for "exaggerated fantasy stories". Throughout the series, the development team aimed for a rate of "99% science and 1% fantasy". Shikura called the 1989 film Back to the Future Part II a direct influence on Steins;Gate, citing how it is just believable enough to feel real. For Robotics;Notes, Mages cooperated with JAXA, the Japan Aerospace Exploration Agency, to bring further realism to the story. Due to the series' use of worldlines – alternative worlds – the developers make use of a correlation chart to track the events in the games' stories, which is updated whenever they create new entries in the series.

Abo noted that while all the games are part of one series, their sound have different images; comparing them to weather, he called Chaos;Head rainy, Steins;Gate cloudy, Robotics;Notes clear weather, and Chaos;Child stormy. He used the same process for all of them when composing the music: he started by reading the story, to understand the setting and characters as well as possible, and writing down notes about the games' emotional flow and the situations that occur throughout the stories. Using these notes, he constructed musical worldviews for the games, with a lot of weight on his first impressions. This approach, while slower than just designating songs to different areas of a game, allowed him to compose higher-quality songs with a better relationship to the games' worldviews. He was given a lot of freedom when working on the series, and was able to make the music he wanted to make for it, something he enjoyed greatly. Abo also got to compose each game's theme song, and was especially happy with Steins;Gate's theme song, "Gate of Steiner", which he aimed to represent the entirety of the game with.

Originally, Occultic;Nine and Anonymous;Code were intended to be part of a separate series from Science Adventure. The former's original light novels were labeled as a separate Paranormal Science NVL series. Its visual novel adaptation and Anonymous;Code were referred to internally as part of the Science Visual Novel series, which was originally announced to be separate from Science Adventure, but has since been incorporated into the series. Occultic;Nine was planned to be updated with new story content tying it more closely with Science Adventure with an expanded release titled New World, but those plans were ultimately scrapped.

The Science Adventure series is partly the child of Infinity, a visual novel series primarily developed by the now-defunct company KID. It contains several references and similar themes, as well as a similar focus on science fiction elements. Some of the staff who worked with KID and the Infinity series, such as Naotaka Hayashi, Chiyomaru Shikura, and Takeshi Abo, came together to work on Chaos;Head, and later, the rest of the Science Adventure series.

== Reception ==
Japanese and Western review scores As of October 8, 2020.
Game	Famitsu	Metacritic
Chaos;Head	32/40	–
Steins;Gate	34/40	87/100
Chaos;Head Love Chu Chu!	26/40	–
Steins;Gate: My Darling's Embrace	30/40	73/100
Robotics;Notes	30/40	80/100
Steins;Gate: Linear Bounded Phenogram	34/40	–
Chaos;Child	31/40	76/100
Steins;Gate 0	35/40	81/100
Occultic;Nine	33/40	–
Robotics;Notes DaSH	31/40	–

The games have also received generally positive reviews, both in Japan and the West. Critics have enjoyed the story, the music and visuals, and the implementation of the gameplay elements within the visual novel presentation, although some have noted how it is complicated and difficult to unlock certain routes. Anime News Network wrote that the series has well-paced mysteries and uses creative concepts, but that the conclusions often are not as good as the set-ups.

In 2009, Steins;Gate won Famitsu's annual Game of Excellence award. RPGFan included Steins;Gate on a list over the 30 essential role-playing games of 2010–2015, calling it one of the best visual novels on the market. It was also nominated for the Golden Joystick Awards, for best handheld/mobile game of 2015.

In the West, while reviews for the series are generally positive, many of the official English releases for the games have been criticized for their subpar release quality, including mistranslations, inconsistent terminology, and technical issues, among other things. Because of the lacking quality of official releases, a large fan group called the Committee of Zero has worked on patches for most of the games, including massive translation fixes, content restoration, technical fixes, and other miscellaneous additions to improve the player experience. Anonymous;Code's English release received more praise on this front, being translated by the experienced, long-time Science Adventure fan Andrew Hodgson, along with a full English dub. However, the price was criticized, as many considered it to be too high for the game's length.

=== Sales ===
The Science Adventure series has been a commercial success for Mages, with the release of Chaos;Head and Steins;Gate helping establishing them as a game developer. In June 2011, Steins;Gate sales passed 300,000 copies sold, something Shikura noted as an achievement for its genre. A year later, he revealed that there had been more than 80,000 preorders for Robotics;Notes, which was a large improvement compared to Steins;Gate's original release. Steins;Gate 0 similarly did well commercially, selling 100,000 copies during its first day, bringing the combined sales of all Steins;Gate games past one million copies. Chaos;Child's original release, however, failed to chart on Media Create's weekly top 50 sales list in Japan, selling an estimated 1,415 copies.

The English console releases of Steins;Gate performed "phenomenally" well, with a large majority of the sold copies being of the PlayStation Vita version; according to PQube's head of marketing, Geraint Evans, it was the game that made PQube break through and get noticed as a publisher. Steins;Gate Elite's international PC release was among the best-selling new releases of the month on Steam. (Note: Based on total revenue for the first two weeks on sale)

== Related media and other appearances ==
In addition to the games, the series has seen adaptations and spin-offs in several types of media, such as audio dramas, stage plays, light novels, and manga. There are also anime adaptations of all four of the main series games – Chaos;Head (2008), Steins;Gate (2011), Robotics;Notes (2012–13), and Chaos;Child (2017) – and of Occultic;Nine (2016), as well as Steins;Gate 0 (2018), a "final route" to the story of Steins;Gate 0. The Steins;Gate anime series was followed by the anime film Load Region of Déjà Vu in 2013. A live action Steins;Gate television series is also in production by Skydance Television. There are several music albums featuring the games' original soundtracks, as well as albums featuring new arrangements.

The Steins;Gate characters Kurisu Makise and Mayuri Shiina appear in the 2012 role-playing video game Nendoroid Generation. Kurisu also appears as a playable character along with the Chaos;Head character Rimi Sakihata in the 2011 fighting game Phantom Breaker, and along with the Robotics;Notes character Frau Koujiro in the 2013 game Phantom Breaker: Battle Grounds. Multiple Steins;Gate characters also appear as bosses in the 2013 role-playing game Divine Gate.

Our World is Ended is a Japanese science fiction visual novel developed by Red Entertainment and published by PQube in North America and Europe for the Nintendo Switch, PlayStation 4, and Microsoft Windows in 2019. But, this updated version, dubbed Judgement 7 - Our World is Ended was published by Mages in Japan for the Nintendo Switch, PlayStation 4 in 2019. Mages advertises this game as a "Masterpiece for Science Adventure fans".
