= Committee of 300 =

Conspiracy theory

The Committee of 300 is a conspiracy theory that claims a powerful group was founded by the British aristocracy in 1727 and rules the world. Proponents of the theory alleging the Committee's existence believe it to be an international council that organizes politics, commerce, banking, media, and the military for centralized global efforts.

== Background ==
The theory dates to a statement made by German politician Walther Rathenau in a 1909 article, "Geschäftlicher Nachwuchs", in Neue Freie Presse:

Three hundred men, all of whom know one another, guide the economic destinies of the Continent and seek their successors from their own milieu.

In context, Rathenau was actually deploring the oligarchic implications of this statement, and did not suggest that the "three hundred" were Jewish. However, by 1912, Theodor Fritsch had seized upon the sentence as an "open confession of indubitable Jewish hegemony" and as proof that Rathenau was the "secret Kaiser of Germany". The idea became more popular after World War I, and the spread of The Protocols of the Elders of Zion. Rathenau addressed the issue in a 1921 letter, stating that the three hundred referred to were leaders in the business world, rather than Jews.

After Rathenau's assassination in June 1922, one of his assassins explicitly cited Rathenau's membership in the "three hundred Elders of Zion" as justification for the killing.

== Later theory ==
Arthur Cherep-Spiridovich wrote that the group may also be known as the "Hidden Hand", which is headed by the Rothschild family of international financiers and based loosely around many of the top national banking institutions and royal families of the world. This version of the conspiracy theory claims that the Rothschild family are merely a part of the club and not the leaders.

== In popular culture ==
The Committee of 300 is the main antagonist of the Science Adventure multimedia series.
