= Chiyomaru Shikura =

Japanese composer and writer (born 1970)

- 志倉千代丸
- Born: July 3, 1970 (age 56); Saitama Prefecture, Japan
- Occupations: Video game writer; lyricist; composer
- Years active: 2005–present
- Notable work: Science Adventure series
- Title: Executive producer of Mages

Chiyomaru Shikura (志倉千代丸, Shikura Chiyomaru; born July 3, 1970) is a Japanese video game writer, lyricist and composer. He is the executive producer and former chairman of Mages. He planned and wrote the 2008 visual novel Chaos;Head, and subsequently other works in the Science Adventure series including Steins;Gate. He has also been credited with composing the opening and ending songs of the Science Adventure series.

== Career ==
During the 1990s and early 2000s, he composed music for various visual novel games. He has also collaborated with Yūko Miyamura, composing music for the band loose@rouse.

In April 2005, he founded 5pb. Inc. (Note: Later renamed to Mages.) after stepping down as director of Scitron. He later became the chairman of Mages with the merging of the company with AG-ONE.

In January 2023, he stepped down as chairman of Mages but remained as executive producer.

== Science Adventure series ==
Shikura has created and worked on all 6 main entries in the Science Adventure series.

- Chaos;Head, Steins;Gate, Robotics;Notes, Chaos;Child, Anonymous;Code, Steins;???: Creator, writer, lyricist.
- Occultic;Nine: Creator, writer.
