= Our World Is Ended =

2017 video game

- Developer: Red Entertainment
- Publishers: JP: 5pb.; WW: PQube
- Director: Naoki Morita
- Artist: Eiri Shirai
- Writer: Taro Achi
- Composers: Shun Narita; Yuichiro Tsukagoshi
- Platforms: PlayStation Vita; Nintendo Switch; PlayStation 4; Microsoft Windows
- Release: PlayStation Vita: JP: November 9, 2017; Nintendo Switch, PS4: NA/EU: April 18, 2019; Judgement 7: Our World Is Ended: JP: February 28, 2019; Microsoft Windows: WW: May 29, 2019
- Genre: Visual Novel
- Mode: Single-player

Our World Is Ended (Note: Our World Is Ended (Japanese: 俺達の世界わ終っている。, Hepburn: Oretachi No Sekai Wa Owatteiru.)) is a Japanese science fiction visual novel developed by Red Entertainment and published by 5pb. for the PlayStation Vita in November 2017. Originally only released in Japan, the game was later released by PQube in North America and Europe for the Nintendo Switch, PlayStation 4, and Microsoft Windows in 2019. An extended, Japanese-only version was also released earlier that same year for consoles.

== Gameplay ==
The game plays as a traditional visual novel, largely entailing reading with limited player interaction. Player choice primarily comes in the form of the game's SOS (Selection of Soul) system; when at a branching point, the game flow will pause, and a number of dialogue choices will quickly scroll across the screen. The player must quickly choose an option, which will change the course of the conversation. Not answering is an option as well, though it generally incurs a negative outcome from associated characters.

== Story ==
=== Characters ===
The game's story revolves around the seven members of the fictional small indie video game developer "Judgement 7". The team is generally portrayed as dysfunctional. The player assume the role of Reiji Gozen, a relative new part time assistant to the company, who is described as "exceeding average" and generally has not yet received the respect of the rest of the team. Sekai Owari is the team's founder, leader, who is incredible at computer programming, but is frequently lazy, off-topic, or unprofessional to others. "Iruka No. 2" is the team's story and scenario planner, though his chunibyo (delusions of grandeur) traits often lead people to be confused as to what he's attempting to convey, with him often giving long, context-less monologues with screaming involved. Asano Hayase is the team's sound composer, despite being tone deaf, but was generally quickly pushed to berating and physically attacking others. Natsumi Yuuki is the team's illustrator; she is generally good at it, but is exceedingly cold and secluded from the rest of the team. Tatiana Alexandrovna Sharapova is the team's second programmer - she is a child prodigy at it, but as a child, throws tantrums very often. Rounding out the team is Yuuno Hayase - Asano's younger sister and assistant to the team; she exudes positivity, but is extremely airheaded.

=== Premise and setting ===
Owari, in his efforts to create an interactive augmented reality headset, errors out and creates a virtual reality world that looks like the real world. However, in exploring the world, the team come' to realize they have limited ability to "hack" the world in the same way that they code and develop video games. The group faces adversity from multiple sources; fictional characters in the game that create obstacles for the team to overcome, signs that the world will self-destruct, and a mysterious organization sending men in black to kill them - all of which are indicated to kill them in real life if it kills them in the simulation.

== Development ==
The game was first announced in May 2017, exclusively for the PlayStation Vita platform. The game was developed by Red Entertainment, and was directed by Naoki Morita, who was previously responsible for the story planning for the entries of the Sakura Wars series developed by Red Entertainment.

The games initial release in Japan was only on the Vita in late 2017. The game's publisher, 5pb., noted that the release was well-received, and was motivating them release version for the Nintendo Switch, PlayStation 4, and Microsoft Windows. In October 2018, versions for the Switch, PS4, and Windows were all announced for a 2019 release in the West.

== Reception ==
The game generally received mixed reception from critics, though critics generally agreed on what worked and what did not. Multiple reviewers felt the game was similar, but inferior, to the Japanese visual novel Steins;Gate. The game's graphics and art style were generally praised. Many reviewers complained about sophomoric and crass jokes, and characters generally acting like perverts, stating that it marred the overall narrative. PlayStation Lifestyle compared it to a fusion of common anime tropes and It's Always Sunny in Philadelphia, arguing that players' assessments of the game would vary depending on the extent to which they found this combination of influences appealing.

== Alternate versions and potential sequel ==
While Our World Is Ended on the Vita was not translated into English, the version of the game that English speaking regions received on Switch, PS4 and Windows, is actually a port of the base Vita version. The Switch and PS4 versions in Japan feature extended content. This updated version, dubbed Judgement 7 - Our World Is Ended contains approximately a 30% extension of the game's story, adding another 2 million Japanese text characters to the main story. The story also has two new characters not present in the original, intermixed into the game's story (similar to Persona 4 Golden and Persona 5 Royal character additions to their respective base games). Jellyfish Number 3 is the little sister of Iruka Number 2, who speaks in the same confusing manner, but often gets exasperated and drops the act, and Mamori Mimori, a delusional stalker in love with Reiji. Its development timeframe conflicted with the original's work-in-progress localization, and to date, the extended version remains Japan-only. This version was published by 5pb., who advertised it as a "Masterpiece for Science Adventure fans".

In June 2018, the original game's director, Naoki Morita, announced that planning on a sequel had begun, and that the full-scale work on the project was about to begin. While still in early stages, he outlined a number of ideas about the title; it will be a completely new title with a new cast of characters and setting, but will generally retain the originals style of being a visual novel that follows a cast of seven youths who are experiencing issues related to their worldview. The game is targeting the Switch and PS4 platforms, though no updates about the project have been given since 2018.
