= Steins;Gate Elite =

Japanese visual novel game

- Cover art, featuring (top to bottom) Makise Kurisu, Rintaro Okabe, and Shiina Mayuri
- Developer: 5pb.
- Publishers: JP: 5pb.; WW: Spike Chunsoft
- Producer: Tatsuya Matsubara
- Series: Science Adventure
- Platforms: PlayStation 4, PlayStation Vita, Nintendo Switch, Microsoft Windows, iOS
- Release: PS4, NS: JP: September 20, 2018; WW: February 19, 2019; PlayStation Vita: JP: September 20, 2018; Microsoft Windows: WW: February 19, 2019; iOS: JP: October 15, 2019
- Genres: Visual novel; Interactive movie
- Mode: Single-player

Steins;Gate Elite (Note: Steins;Gate Elite (Japanese: シュタインズ・ゲート エリート, Hepburn: Shutainzu Gēto Erīto)) is a science fiction visual novel and interactive movie video game, part of the Science Adventure series. It was developed by 5pb. for PlayStation 4, PlayStation Vita, Nintendo Switch, Microsoft Windows and iOS, and was released in September 2018 in Japan and in February 2019 internationally. It is an updated, fully animated remake of the 2009 game Steins;Gate, using footage from the anime adaptation of the original game along with newly produced animation by White Fox.

The game has received generally positive reviews, with critics praising its story, footage of the anime adaptation of the original game, and visuals.

== Overview ==
Steins;Gate Elite is a science fiction visual novel and interactive movie game, an updated version of the 2009 game Steins;Gate. Unlike previous games in the Science Adventure series, it is fully animated, using all the footage from the Steins;Gate anime series along with newly produced animation for story routes not adapted in the anime; the animation is played together with the script and voiced dialogue from the original game. The player reads the on-screen text and presses a button to advance the animation and text, and thereby progresses through the story. At certain points, the player makes choices which cause the story to branch, leading to different endings.

== Production ==
=== Development ===
Steins;Gate Elite was developed by 5pb., and was planned by Chiyomaru Shikura and produced by Tatsuya Matsubara. The new animation was produced by White Fox, the studio that produced the Steins;Gate anime series. Shikura had for a long time thought about how to evolve the visual novel genre, as he felt it had been largely stagnant. He was influenced by the Yarudora series of games, which are fully animated and voice acted, liking how fully animated visual novels would have the advantage of both containing prose describing characters' internal feelings, and showing movements and expressions that are not as easily conveyed through character sprites and prose only. He did however note that making a full-length visual novel in that style would be difficult due to production costs and how long the development would take. Realizing that a project like it would have to reuse old animation to be feasible, it was decided to create a game using material from the anime adaptation of Steins;Gate, as it already contained a large portion of the story from the original game.

There were still difficulties involved in incorporating the anime footage in Steins;Gate Elite: In a typical visual novel, each character only talks and acts when the player pushes a button, while multiple characters can move and talk at the same time in an anime. This resulted in the anime footage having to be deconstructed, with each character's movements in a scene separated into its own individually playable animations. Because the player character uses his cell phone at several points in the game, they also had to add new animations of him taking it out. Other difficulties involved discrepancies between the original game and the anime adaptation, such as characters being in different locations for certain scenes in the anime compared to the original game; taking care of these situations alone took six months. The user interface was also redesigned to be subtle and blend in with the animation.

=== Release ===
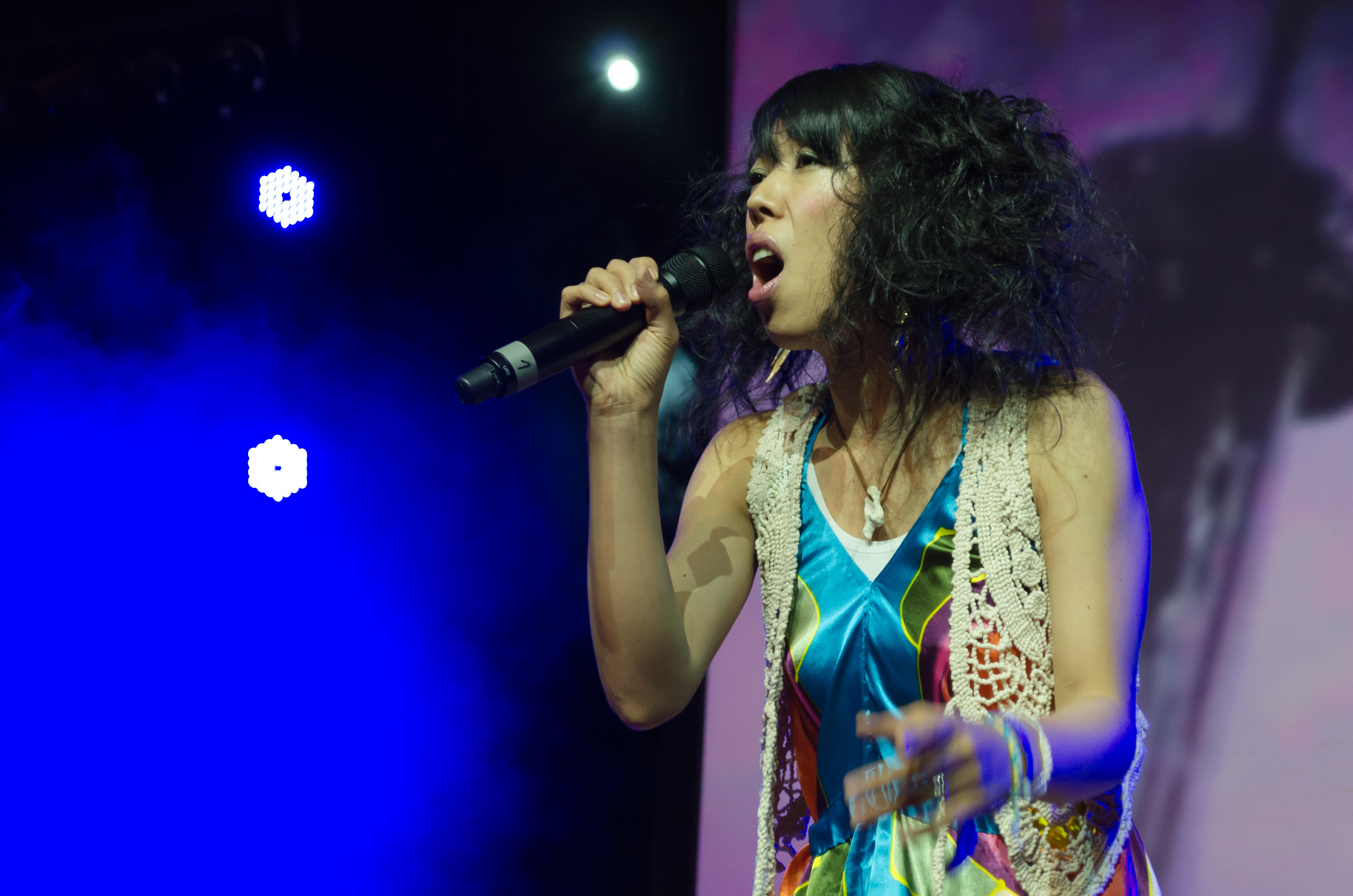
Kanako Itō performed the game's opening theme, "Cosmic Looper".

The game was announced at the Chiyo-ST Live 2017 Genesis event in Tokyo in May 2017, and was showcased at Sega's booth at Tokyo Game Show 2017, with a seven-minute demo available for the public to play. The full game, which is branded as a "Full Animation Adventure", was released on September 20, 2018, in Japan for PlayStation 4, PlayStation Vita and Nintendo Switch, with no differences between the three platforms. Although it had originally been announced for release on March 15, 2018, it was delayed as further improvements to the quality were deemed necessary. In March 2018, Spike Chunsoft's newly established American subsidiary announced that they would publish the game in North America and Europe for PlayStation 4, Nintendo Switch and Microsoft Windows: they were released on February 19, 2019. The English versions use the script from the English release of the original Steins;Gate, along with Japanese audio. An iOS version was later released in Japan on October 15, 2019.

The PlayStation 4, PlayStation Vita and Microsoft Windows versions include an HD remaster of the 2013 game Steins;Gate: Linear Bounded Phenogram, while the Nintendo Switch version includes the newly developed 8-bit ADV Steins;Gate, (Note: Titled Famicolle ADV Steins;Gate in Japanese; not to be confused with the similarly-titled 2011 game Steins;Gate 8bit.) a Steins;Gate game in the style of 1980s adventure games for the Famicom console. 8-bit ADV Steins;Gate was developed to be as true to Famicom games of the time as possible, and so the development team made use of older tools to produce it, such as using the 6502CPU to assemble assets and the 2A03 sound chip to compose the sound.

== Reception ==
Reception

Aggregate scores
Aggregator	Score
Metacritic	NS: 85/100; PS4: 86/100
OpenCritic	91 %

Review scores
Publication	Score
Destructoid	9/10
Eurogamer	7/10
Famitsu	33/40
Hardcore Gamer	4.5/5
IGN	9/10
Nintendo World Report	8/10
PlayStation Official Magazine – UK	9/10
Push Square	9/10
Gameblog	9/10
Gaming Age	A
PlayStation LifeStyle	9/10
RPGFan	95%
Vandal	9.2/10

=== Pre-release ===
Reviewing the game's Tokyo Game Show demo, Famitsu wrote that they thought the game felt fresh despite how they had already played the original game and watched the anime. Because of the added animations, they thought the game gave a greater feeling of urgency than the original Steins;Gate, and described it as feeling like they were moving the animation due to how it waits for the player to press a button before moving. Dengeki PlayStation were initially negative towards the idea of remaking Steins;Gate using material from the anime, but were positively surprised when they played the demo. IGN was positive to the demo, and thought the anime footage prevented the monotony one can feel when playing visual novels with static background images and character sprites.

=== Post-release ===
The PlayStation 4, Nintendo Switch and PlayStation Vita versions of the game were the second, fourth and twentieth best-selling physical video games in Japan during their debut week, selling a combined total of 30,442 copies. The PC version was among the best-selling new releases of the month on Steam. (Note: Based on total revenue for the first two weeks on sale)

Steins;Gate Elite was well received by critics according to the review aggregator platform Metacritic, and was the 10th best reviewed PlayStation 4 game and 22nd best reviewed Nintendo Switch game of the year. Famitsu enjoyed the combination of reading the visual novel script and watching the animation, and liked the newly produced animated sequences.

== Related media ==
The game's opening theme, "Cosmic Looper", the insert songs "Technovision", "Sky Clad Observer" and "A.R." as well as the first ending theme "Another Heaven" are performed by Kanako Itō. The second ending theme, "Annie no Yubiwa" (アニーの指輪, Anī no Yubiwa; "Annie's Ring"), as well as the insert song "Masquerade" are performed by Yui Sakakibara. Both the opening and second ending themes were released on singles on September 19, 2018. The full Steins;Gate Elite Original Soundtrack album was released by Mages on March 18, 2020. Steins;Gate 0 Elite, a follow-up which updates the sequel Steins;Gate 0 in the same manner as Steins;Gate Elite did with Steins;Gate, was announced at the annual Science Adventure Live event in January 2020, and is in development by Mages.
