= Steins;Gate 0 =

Japanese visual novel game

- Cover art, featuring (clockwise from top left) Maho, Rintaro, Kurisu, and Kagari
- Developer: 5pb.
- Publishers: JP: 5pb.; NA/EU: PQube (PS4, Vita); WW: Spike Chunsoft (Win, Switch)
- Directors: Takuya Nishimura; Toshihiko Kajioka; Yusuke Matsumoto; Eriko Mizuno
- Producer: Tatsuya Matsubara
- Artist: Huke
- Writers: Chiyomaru Shikura; Naotaka Hayashi; Toru Yasumoto; Masaki Takimoto; Tsukasa Tsuchiya
- Composer: Takeshi Abo
- Series: Science Adventure
- Platforms: PlayStation 3; PlayStation 4; PlayStation Vita; Microsoft Windows; Xbox One; Nintendo Switch
- Release: December 10, 2015: PlayStation 3; JP: December 10, 2015 PlayStation 4, PS Vita; JP: December 10, 2015; EU: November 25, 2016; NA: November 29, 2016 Microsoft Windows; JP: August 26, 2016; WW: May 8, 2018 Xbox One; JP: February 22, 2017 Nintendo Switch; JP: March 20, 2019; WW: December 10, 2019
- Genre: Visual novel
- Mode: Single-player

Steins;Gate 0 (Note: Steins;Gate 0 (Japanese: シュタインズ・ゲート ゼロ, Hepburn: Shutainzu Gēto Zero)) is a 2015 visual novel video game developed by 5pb. It is part of the Science Adventure series, and is set in the period of the 2009 game Steins;Gate. It was released by 5pb. in Japan for the PlayStation 3, PlayStation 4 and PlayStation Vita in December 2015, Microsoft Windows in August 2016, Xbox One in February 2017, and Nintendo Switch in March 2019.

It was also released by PQube in North America and Europe for the PlayStation 4 and PlayStation Vita in 2016, and by Spike Chunsoft internationally for Microsoft Windows in 2018 and Nintendo Switch in 2019. A manga adaptation premiered in 2017, and an anime adaptation of the game premiered in 2018. The story is seen from several characters' viewpoints, mainly the protagonist of the original game Rintaro Okabe, Amane Suzuha, and the neuroscientist Hiyajo Maho. After meeting Maho and her co-worker Alexis Leskinen, Okabe becomes a tester for the artificial intelligence (AI) system Amadeus. The player reads the text and dialogue that comprise the story, and affects the direction of the plot by choosing whether to answer phone calls from the Amadeus; early in the game, the story splits into two main branches, which in turn branch into different endings.

The game was planned by Chiyomaru Shikura, using Steins;Gate audio dramas and light novels as a base for one of the routes; it is not a direct adaptation of them, however, and features a new scenario. The music was composed by Takeshi Abo, who made notes of his first impressions of the emotional flow while reading the story, using these to create music with a good relation to the game's worldview. The English localization was a large project, taking place over the course of five months; it was done with the intention to avoid Westernizing the game too much due to the importance the Japanese setting and culture hold in the game, while still striving to keep it accessible for Western players. Steins;Gate 0 was well-received by critics, who praised the story, characters, gameplay, visuals and audio.

== Gameplay ==
The player reads the narrative in the text box, and can interact with characters by replying to messages on their in-game phone with text or stickers.

Steins;Gate 0 is a visual novel, where the player reads through the story in the form of passages of text and dialogue, accompanied by character sprites and background art. The story consists of multiple branches, which lead to different endings. As opposed to the original Steins;Gate's single route that runs from start to finish with multiple branch points throughout, Steins;Gate 0 features one branch point near the beginning of the game, where the story splits into two major story branches, which in turn branch again into the different endings; there are in total two main story paths, along with four side stories. The direction of the story is determined based on whether or not the player chooses to answer calls from the artificial intelligence Amadeus, which the player character Okabe Rintaro can communicate with through his cell phone. In addition to Okabe, the player also takes the roles of other characters, mostly Amane Suzuha and Hiyajo Maho. The player can also use Okabe's phone to interact with his friends through the messaging app RINE: at some points, the game shows a notification indicating that Okabe has received a message, and the player can choose between different messages to send back – either text messages or stickers – temporarily locking the game into a conversation with the other character that changes depending on the player's reply. Unlike the Amadeus calls, the RINE messages do not affect the branching of the story.

== Synopsis ==
=== Setting ===
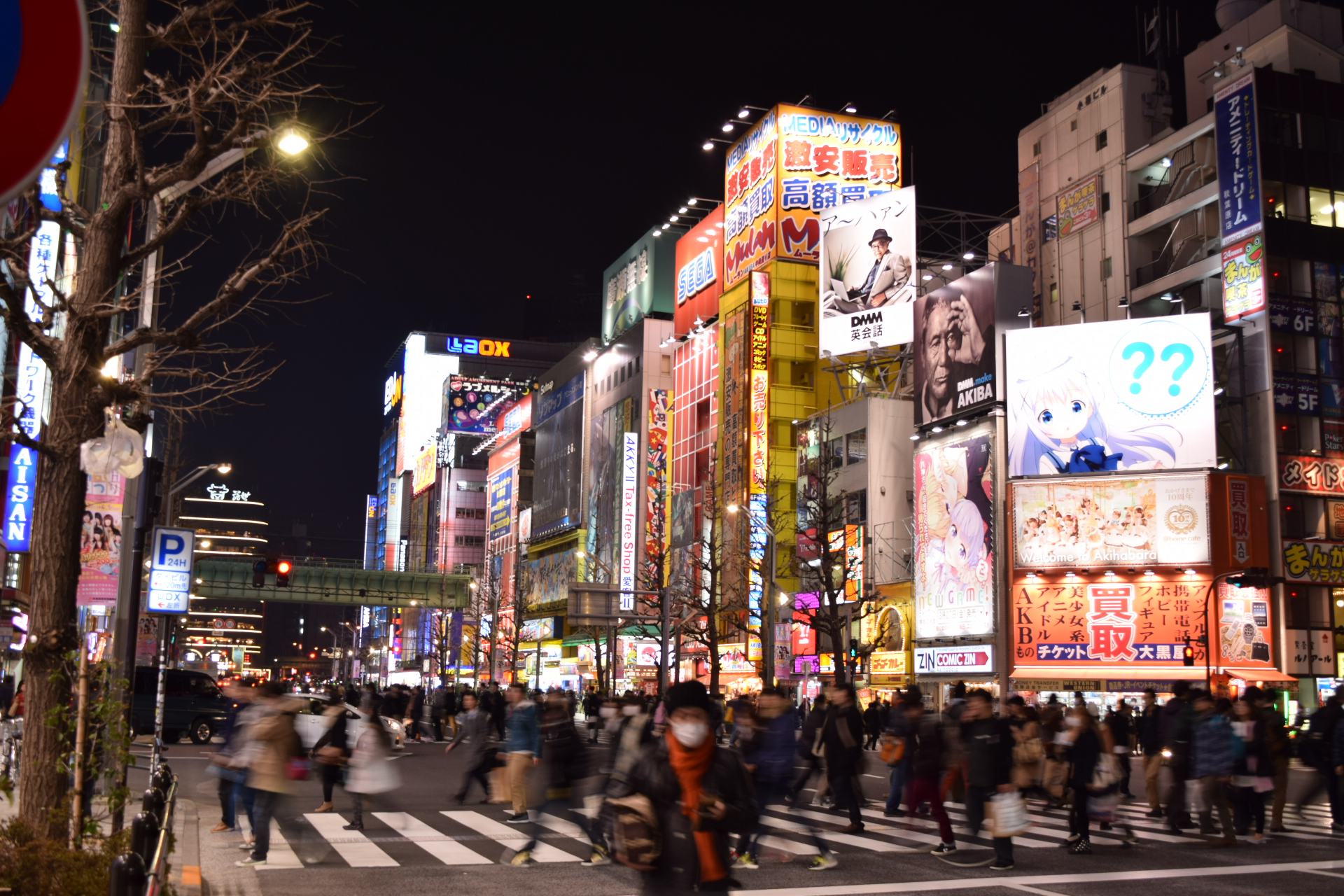
The game is set in Akihabara, Tokyo.

Steins;Gate set in Akihabara, Tokyo. It follows several characters, including the university student Okabe "Okarin" Rintaro, who, together with his friends Shiina "Mayushii" Mayuri, the neuroscientist Makise Kurisu and the hacker Hashida "Daru" Itaru, accidentally have discovered time travel through the use of a microwave oven and a phone – the PhoneWave – which they used to send text messages and digitized memory data back in time. The latter, referred to as "time leaping", essentially creates a copy of memories from a person's mind and is intended to send this "knowledge/digitalized data" back in time and into the same user's mind, at an earlier point. This has drawn the attention of SERN (clearly referring to the real CERN), an organization that secretly researches time travel, who sent their team of "Rounders" to confiscate the time machine, including the journalist Kiryu Moeka, killing Mayuri in the process.

Within the setting, time does not consist only of alternative time lines. Each time line is different, and the "unit measure" that defines this difference is called divergence. The detector to measure this is called a divergence meter which was set to 0% when it was created . When it travels into another time line, it measures the divergence (difference) of this new time line from its original. Time lines that are minor variations on a greater "reality/history course" are minor branches on what is called a world line, basically a whole series of connected time lines. This means certain events are fixed points, destined to happen in all branch time lines, unless divergence is enough to lead to another world line. On a greater scale is the idea of an attractor field, a larger scale version of a world line. One important fixed point in the story is Mayuri's death in 2010, which must happen in any time line belonging to the Alpha attractor field. To prevent Mayuri's death, Okabe needs to make a significant enough change to cause a shift from the Alpha attractor field to Beta, where instead Kurisu destined to die in 2010 and in which time travel is not discovered. Between the Alpha and Beta attractor fields lies the Steins Gate world line, unaffected by their convergence points. Some people can retain memories from the previous time lines after a shift, Okabe in particular possessing a very strong effect. He calls it Reading Steiner.

Steins;Gate 0 is a prequel to Steins;Gate. Among other characters are Daru's future daughter, the time traveler Amane Suzuha; Mayuri's future adoptive daughter Shiina Kagari; Kurisu's co-workers Hiyajo Maho, Alexis Leskinen and Judy Reyes from Viktor Chondria University; Okabe's friends Urushibara Luka and Akiha "Faris NyanNyan" Rumiho; and Mayuri's friends Amane Yuki, Nakase "Fubuki" Katsumi and Kurushima Kaede.

=== Plot ===
The game begins with a scene similar to Steins;Gate's ending, where Suzuha traveled to August 21, 2010, using her time machine to get Okabe to prevent a time-travel arms race leading to World War III; to do this, he needs to stop Kurisu's father, Doctor Nakabachi, from killing Kurisu and bringing her time travel theories to Russia. Suzuha brings Okabe to the moment of the murder, July 28, 2010, but he accidentally kills Kurisu himself, seemingly due to world-line convergence. Upon returning to the present, Okabe refuses Suzuha's requests to try again, and develops post-traumatic stress disorder. Nearly five months later, Okabe attends Kurisu's coworkers Maho and Leskinen's presentation of their Amadeus system, which uses digitized memories as artificial intelligence avatars; one avatar has been made based on Kurisu. Speaking with them, Okabe becomes a tester for Amadeus, allowing him to communicate with Amadeus Kurisu through his phone. While trying to change Okabe's mind, Suzuha looks for Kagari, who got separated when traveling to 1998. Maho, who has Kurisu's hard drive, wants to access her theories, hoping to be able to save Kurisu; Russia, other countries, and groups including SERN are also after the theories, and the world line shifts as they monitor activities surrounding Kurisu's theories and memories.

The story splits into two major branches: In the one leading to the ending "Promised Rinascimento", Okabe rebuilds the PhoneWave to help an amnesiac woman identified as Kagari, who has had Kurisu's memories implanted by someone, which gradually overwrites her personality; this inadvertently transports him to 2036 during World War III. Although Okabe had been predetermined to die sometime in 2025, Daru circumvented it by implanting 2011 memory data, as Okabe's body was still alive. Inspired by this and determined to avert this future, Okabe returns to 2010, destroys the hard drive, erases Amadeus, and sends a D-RINE message to the past of this branch, telling himself to "deceive the world and tie the possibilities". The resulting world line is not shown.

The first major branch has two side branches: In "Recursive Mother Goose", Okabe and Mayuri trace the origin of Kagari's only memory, a song they learn Okabe originally sung as a child after Mayuri's grandmother's death. After nearly being hit by a truck, Kagari regains memories, including having escaped a facility she was held at in 2005. Mayuri intends to time travel with Suzuha to reach Steins Gate, but Kagari takes Mayuri's place as she fears not meeting her in Steins Gate.

In "Twin Automata", Maho hides in Faris's apartment after a kidnapping attempt, and befriends Moeka. Noticing that somebody is trying to steal Amadeus, Leskinen and Maho go to lock down the data, but they are ambushed by Reyes, who shoots Leskinen and tries to make Maho give her the Amadeus access codes. Maho decides to erase Amadeus rather than give it up, and she is saved when Moeka shoots Reyes. While Amadeus Kurisu is being deleted, a Kurisu apparently from another worldline takes her perspective. She calls for help, and tells Maho that Steins Gate is real, and tells Maho her laptop password is related to Piano Sonata No. 10, a piece by Mozart that had been the theme for this ending branch. Returning home, Maho figures out Kurisu's password from this hint and finds her research.

In the second major branch, leading to "Vega and Altair", Okabe stops testing Amadeus. If the "Promised Rinascimento" ending was completed first, a D-RINE message will appear early into the branch with its cryptic message: "deceive the world and tie the possibilities", but its origin is unknown. He and Maho are followed by groups who want Kurisu's theories, and Kurisu's hard drive is destroyed in a skirmish. Daru and Maho secretly rebuild the PhoneWave in an effort to save Kurisu, but is unable to complete the test due to missing components; Okabe tells them that saving Kurisu means sacrificing Mayuri, which Mayuri overhears. She decides to travel back in time with Suzuha to convince Okabe in 2010 to save Kurisu after failing in his prior attempt. However, Leskinen appears, revealing that he works for the intelligence agency Strategic Focus and intends to steal the time machine. Mayuri and Suzuha attempt to flee in the time machine, but it is hit by a rocket and destroyed. In the aftermath, Okabe discloses the missing components to Daru and Maho to complete the PhoneWave, thus allowing him to time leap to an earlier part of the day, and works to ensure Mayuri and Suzuha's successful time travel. Surrounded by Leskinen's men, he declares that he will find a way to Steins Gate.

The second major branch has the side branch "Gehenna's Stigma", where Maho is caught eavesdropping on Reyes and Leskinen, hearing that Leskinen thinks Okabe hides information. Leskinen uses Maho: She meets Okabe, who tells her about time travel provided that she does not try to save Kurisu. After he reveals where Suzuha's time machine is, Maho suffocates him; when waking up, he is tortured for information by Leskinen. Wracked with guilt for betraying Okabe, Maho makes an unsuccessful attempt to save Kurisu in her own way. World War III begins, Daru flees Akihabara to develop the time machine, and Okabe gives up on reaching Steins Gate.

The final ending, "Milky-way Crossing", only appears after completing the "Promised Rinascimento" and "Vega and Altair" endings. It is set in 2025 on a world line similar to, but not the same as, the one from "Vega and Altair". Okabe sends a D-Mail video to his 2010 counterpart, instructing himself how to save Kurisu and cause the world line divergence into Steins Gate, thus setting the events that would play out as the True End route in the previous game. He then leaves in the time machine to find Suzuha and Mayuri, and bring them safely back to 2025.

== Production ==
=== Development ===
Steins;Gate 0 was developed by 5pb., and was planned by Chiyomaru Shikura and produced by Tatsuya Matsubara, and features character designs by Huke. The scenario was worked on by Naotaka Hayashi, Toru Yasumoto, Masaki Takimoto, and Tsukasa Tsuchiya, and makes use of the Epigraph Trilogy (Note: The Epigraph Trilogy includes the titles Steins;Gate: Epigraph of the Closed Curve, Steins;Gate: Pandora of Eternal Return, and Steins;Gate: Altair of the Point at Infinity.) series of light novels and Steins;Gate audio dramas as a base for Vega and Altair route, which is the main route. It is however not a direct adaptation: it also features new scenarios, and the developers describe it as a "legitimate numbered sequel".

The music was composed by Takeshi Abo. His process for composing the music consisted of him reading the game's story, to get an as full as possible understanding of the setting and the character personalities. He considered his first impressions of the game's emotional flow and events to be very important: he would write them down together with the kind of music he would want to use for each scene, and keep them in mind when composing the music. He said that this approach, while taking longer than if he had just designated songs to various places in the game, made for higher quality music with a better relation to the game's worldview.

The game was announced in March 2015. It was originally scheduled to be released in Japan on November 19, 2015, but was delayed and released on December 10, 2015, for the PlayStation 3, PlayStation 4 and PlayStation Vita. Japanese first-print copies of the PlayStation 4 version included a digital PlayStation 4 copy of the first Steins;Gate. The PlayStation 4 and PlayStation Vita versions of Steins;Gate 0 were released by PQube in Europe on November 25, 2016, and in North America on November 29. They were made available in an "Amadeus Edition" that includes a soundtrack disc, an artbook, a pin badge, and a plush toy, and in a limited edition that includes just the game and the artbook. A Microsoft Windows version was released by 5pb. in Japan on August 26, 2016, after being delayed from its planned release date of June 24, and was published internationally by Spike Chunsoft on May 8, 2018, in both English and Japanese. An Xbox One version was released digitally in Japan on February 22, 2017. The game was also released for the Nintendo Switch as part of the collection Steins;Gate: Divergencies Assort along with Steins;Gate: My Darling's Embrace and Steins;Gate: Linear Bounded Phenogram on March 20, 2019, in Japan; internationally, the Nintendo Switch version was released by Spike Chunsoft on December 10, 2019, as a stand-alone game.

=== Localization ===
The English localization was led by Adam Lensenmayer, who was the sole translator for the project; this was to ensure consistency in the feeling of the story and in the characters' voices. The localization was done over the course of five months, something Lensenmayer noted as a big project. It was also a challenging one: its use of real-world science meant that the localization team had to research subjects like artificial intelligence, cognitive science and time travel theories to ensure that everything was phrased correctly. Another challenge was that Steins;Gate 0 was written specifically for a Japanese audience, who might understand certain things that Western players would not, although Lensenmayer said that this was a smaller problem than it had been with the first Steins;Gate, due to Steins;Gate 0's more serious tone and lesser focus on otaku and internet culture, and its built-in dictionary which explains obscure concepts.

Lensenmayer wrote the localized text with a general audience in mind, intending for it to be accessible regardless of the player's knowledge of the game's setting, while working towards creating something that people who have played the first Steins;Gate would enjoy. The localization team wanted to avoid overt Westernization of the game, because of the importance the Japanese setting and culture held in the story, and strived to achieve a level of Westernization similar to the first Steins;Gate's localization. Lensenmayer said that some parts were difficult to localize, tempting the team to replace them with other, similar content, but that they tried to avoid this whenever they could. Aspects of Japanese culture that were deemed too obscure to Western players were handled the same way as in Steins;Gate: for example, the Japanese term senpai was left intact, with short explanatory dialogue added. One thing that took up a lot of time was localizing the character Mayuri's dialogue due to her way of speaking: Lensenmayer described her as acting "spacey", but not "stupid or ditzy", and said that there is a nuance of caring and awareness to her speech that does not come across in a direct translation. She was seen as a very important character, so conveying her personality accurately was given high priority.

== Reception ==
Reception

Aggregate scores
| Aggregator | Score |
|---|---|
| Metacritic | PS4: 81/100; VITA: 84/100; NS: 79/100 |
| OpenCritic | 84 % |

Review scores
| Publication | Score |
|---|---|
| Destructoid | 8.5/10 |
| Famitsu | 35/40 (10, 8, 9, 8) |
| Hardcore Gamer | 3.5/5 |
| RPGFan | VITA: 85% PS4: 69% |

Steins;Gate 0 was well received by critics, and was the best-reviewed PlayStation Vita game of 2016 on Metacritic. Kotaku considered it among the best Japan-only video games of 2015; it was the runner-up for RPGFan's Best Adventure/Visual Novel of 2016 award, behind Firewatch, with the publication saying that it rivals the first Steins;Gate; and in 2020, Nintendo Life called it one of the best visual novels available on the Nintendo Switch. Critics called it a worthy follow-up to Steins;Gate, but thought that players should experience the original game or its anime adaptation beforehand.

Critics generally liked the story. Famitsu's reviewers particularly liked its atmosphere, and Dennis Carden of Destructoid thought the way it continues the story of Steins;Gate makes it nearly "mandatory" for people who liked the original Steins;Gate. RPGFan's Rob Rogan liked the overall story, calling it "exciting, somber, heart-wrenching, and thought-provoking", and said that it felt "artificially lengthened" through scenes that do not serve a clear purpose in the plot; Robert Fenner, also writing for the same website, said that Okabe's dilemma of wanting to speak to the Amadeus Kurisu but finding it painful is a good premise. Jordan Helm at Hardcore Gamer similarly noted that Okabe's conversations with Amadeus Kurisu were among the highlights of the game, and that character-focused scenes often felt like "padding". Carden enjoyed how the game, despite its generally darker tone than Steins;Gate's, still included moments of levity, saying that it made him "laugh just as much as it made [him] want to cry".

Carden thought most new characters were good additions and felt fully realized. Rogan said that Okabe's character development since the original game made him a more interesting character, and Fenner thought that Okabe's characterization was the high point of the game, calling his self-hatred and impostor syndrome a believable depiction of high-functioning depression. Both Carden and Rogan enjoyed the use of multiple viewpoints in the story, saying that they give characters more depth and believability, and give the player a greater understanding of them.

Critics were positive in their opinions on the gameplay, some considering it too complex. Carden described the difficulty in reaching the different endings without following a guide, and how it sometimes is unclear what the effects of some player choices will be; Fenner did find it fun and compelling to use knowledge from one playthrough to go back and make different choices while aiming for another ending. Rogan mentioned how the player choice system was simpler than the one in Steins;Gate, and Helm thought that the player choices had the tension and regret of the original game's. Fenner appreciated how the RINE system improved upon the text messages from the previous game, allowing the player to see what exact message they would send prior to sending it while simultaneously automatically saving the game. Carden, Rogan and Helm appreciated the Tips system, considering it a helpful way to make sure that players understand concepts and terms discussed in the game.

The art direction, presentation and audio was well received, with Carden calling the visuals "utterly impressive", Rogan describing the character art as "sharp and charming" despite its limited amount of frames per character, and Helm saying that the series' aesthetic breathes life into the scenes. Rogan praised the background art, saying that the large amount of detail adds personality to the scenes without being distracting, and the music, which he said is perfectly matched to each scene's tone. Helm liked how the game uses several contextual sprites for characters rather than just a few static ones, and praised the attention to detail in Okabe's sprites, with their visual signs of mental fatigue.

=== Sales ===
The game sold 100,000 combined physical and digital copies on its first day of release in Japan, bringing total sales for the Steins;Gate games above one million copies sold. By the end of its debut week, 85,547 physical copies had been sold; the PlayStation Vita, PlayStation 4 and PlayStation 3 versions were the sixth, seventh and nineteenth best selling games of the week in Japan with 38,746, 38,156 and 8,645 copies sold, respectively. The PlayStation 4 version re-entered the Japanese sales charts again on the week of the Steins;Gate 0 anime adaptation's premiere, selling an additional 4,087 copies and bringing physical Japanese sales of the PlayStation 4 version to 60,990 copies sold. According to Shikura, the Xbox One version was not expected to sell very many copies.

The PlayStation Vita version was the best selling game for the platform in the United Kingdom during its European debut week, and still appeared on Chart-Track's weekly PlayStation Vita top-twenty charts until June 2017; the PlayStation 4 version did not chart at all in the United Kingdom during its debut, however. The Steam release had an estimated total of 16,300 players by July 2018.

== Related media ==
As part of the "Steins;Gate World Line 2017–2018 Project", several pieces of media based on Steins;Gate 0 were produced, including a manga adaptation by Taka Himeno, which was serialized by Kadokawa Shoten in Young Ace from August 4, 2017, to February 4, 2020, and is collected in tankōbon volumes since April 4, 2018, the manga was localized into English by Udon Entertainment and the first of three volumes was released on September 7, 2021; an anime adaptation of the game by White Fox that premiered on April 11, 2018; and a novelization of the game by Tatsuya Hamazaki, Steins;Gate 0: Solitude of the Mournful Flow, which was published by Kadokawa Sneaker Bunko on August 1, 2018. A conversation partner application based on Amadeus Kurisu was revealed to be in development in September 2019. Steins;Gate 0 Elite, an updated version of the game which adds full animation, like Steins;Gate Elite did with Steins;Gate, was announced at the Science Adventure Live event in January 2020. It was announced to be scheduled for release before Anonymous;Code, which at the time was planned for Q3/Q4 2021 but was delayed until 2022.

Steins;Gate 0-themed merchandise has also been released, including shoes, business card cases, watches, T-shirts, hoodies, and laptop bags. The Steins;Gate 0 Sound Tracks album was released in 2016 by 5pb. and Media Factory.
