= Steins;Gate =

Japanese visual novel video game

- Windows cover, featuring (left to right) Rintaro Okabe, Kurisu Makise, and Mayuri Shiina
- Developers: 5pb.; Nitroplus
- Publishers: 5pb.: JP: Nitroplus (Win); JP: Kadokawa Shoten (PSP); NA: JAST USA (Win); NA/EU: PQube (PS3, PSV); WW: Mages (Win); WW: Spike Chunsoft (Win)
- Director: Tatsuya Matsubara
- Producers: Chiyomaru Shikura; Digitarou; Tatsuya Matsubara
- Artist: Huke
- Writers: Chiyomaru Shikura; Naotaka Hayashi; Shimokura Vio; Tanizaki Ouka
- Composer: Takeshi Abo
- Series: Science Adventure
- Platforms: Xbox 360; Microsoft Windows; PlayStation Portable; iOS; PlayStation 3; PlayStation Vita; Android; PlayStation 4
- Release: October 15, 2009: Xbox 360; JP: October 15, 2009 Microsoft Windows; JP: August 26, 2010; WW: March 31, 2014 PlayStation Portable; JP: June 23, 2011 iOS; JP: August 25, 2011; WW: September 9, 2016 PS3, PS Vita; JP: May 24, 2012 (PS3); JP: March 14, 2013 (Vita); EU: June 5, 2015; NA: August 25, 2015 Android; JP: June 27, 2013 PlayStation 4; JP: December 10, 2015
- Genre: Visual novel
- Mode: Single-player

Steins;Gate is a 2009 science fiction visual novel game developed by 5pb. and Nitroplus. It is the second game in the Science Adventure series, following Chaos;Head. The story follows 18-year old Rintaro Okabe and his friends as they accidentally invent a form of time travel via text messages that can be sent to the past. The gameplay in Steins;Gate includes branching scenarios with courses of interaction.

Steins;Gate was released in Japan for the Xbox 360 in October 2009. The game was ported to Windows in August 2010, PlayStation Portable in June 2011, iOS in August 2011, PlayStation 3 in May 2012, PlayStation Vita in March 2013, and Android in June 2013. JAST USA released the PC version in North America in March 2014, both digitally and as a physical collector's edition, while PQube released the PS3 and Vita versions in North America and Europe in 2015. Additionally, the iOS version was released in English in September 2016. The game is described by the development team as a speculative science ADV.

A manga adaptation of the game, written by Yomi Sarachi, was serialized from 2009 to 2013, and later published in North America from 2015 to 2016. A second manga series, illustrated by Kenji Mizuta, began serialization in Mag Garden's Monthly Comic Blade in December 2009. An anime series adaptation by White Fox aired in Japan from April to September 2011, and has been licensed in North America by Funimation. An animated sequel film premiered in Japanese theaters in April 2013. A fan disc of the game, titled Steins;Gate: My Darling's Embrace, was released in June 2011. A non-canon 8-bit sequel to the game, titled Steins;Gate: Hen'i Kuukan no Octet (also known as Steins;Gate: Variant Space Octet and officially localized as Steins;Gate: Octet of Shifting Space), was released in October 2011. Another game, Steins;Gate: Linear Bounded Phenogram, was released in April 2013.

A follow-up game, Steins;Gate 0, was released in December 2015 for the PlayStation 3, PlayStation 4 and Vita; it received an anime adaptation in 2018. A remake of the original visual novel titled Steins;Gate Elite, which presents fully animated cutscenes from the Steins;Gate anime, was released for the PlayStation 4, PlayStation Vita, Nintendo Switch and Steam in 2019. Included as a bonus for the Nintendo Switch version, an entirely new game called 8-bit ADV Steins;Gate, in the style of Famicom adventure games from the 1980s, was released. Another remake, titled Steins;Gate RE:BOOT, was released on Steam in August 2026; console versions followed in October that year.

== Gameplay ==
A scene in Steins;Gate depicting the phone trigger system. The player can select a blue hyperlink to reply to the message.

Steins;Gate's gameplay requires little interaction from the player as most of the duration of the game is spent reading the text that appears on the screen, which represents either the dialogue between the various characters or the thoughts of the protagonist. Like many other visual novels, there are specific points in Steins;Gate where the user is given a choice to affect the direction of the game. For these decision points, Steins;Gate presents the user with the "phone trigger" (フォーントリガー, fōn torigā) system. When the player receives a phone call, the player can choose to answer or ignore the call. Incoming text messages have specific words underlined and highlighted in blue, much like a hyperlink on a browser, which the player can select to reply to the text message. Most phone calls or text messages do not require a response, though there are certain points in the game where the player is required to take action. Depending on the player's choices of how to respond to these phone calls and text messages, the plot will progress in a specific direction.

== Synopsis ==
=== Setting and themes ===
Steins;Gate is set in the summer of 2010, approximately one year after the events that took place in Chaos;Head, in Akihabara. Physical locales of Akihabara like the Radio Kaikan building can be spotted in the game. According to Chiyomaru Shikura, who headed the planning of Steins;Gate, Akihabara was chosen because it is an easy place for acquiring hardware parts, which makes it the ideal place for people interested in inventing and tinkering with things. The notion of time and time traveling are the main themes of the game. The concept of cause and effect is featured prominently in the game as the protagonist travels back in time numerous times to perform different actions in an attempt to alter what has happened in the future. Steins;Gate also features hard science fiction elements.

=== Characters ===
Rintaro "Okarin" Okabe (岡部 倫太郎, Okabe Rintarō)
The player assumes the role of Rintaro Okabe, the protagonist of Steins;Gate. Okabe is an eccentric individual, a self-proclaimed mad scientist who often goes by the pseudonym Kyouma Hououin (鳳凰院 凶真, Hōōin Kyōma). Mayuri and Daru call him "Okarin" (オカリン), a portmanteau of his surname and given name. He is 18 years old and a first-year student at Tokyo Denki University, alongside being the founder of what he calls the "Future Gadget Laboratory" (未来ガジェット研究所, Mirai Gajetto Kenkyūjo) in Akihabara, where he spends most of his time and has dubbed himself Lab Member No. 001 (as he is the first person to join). Okabe gives off the appearance of being delusional and paranoid, frequently referring to the "Organization" that is after him, talking to himself on his phone, and engaging in fits of maniacal laughter. He is frequently mocked for this behavior, mostly by Kurisu and Itaru, and referred to as a chunibyou, although as the story progresses, he mellows out and shows that deep down he is a kind-hearted and loyal friend, only playing up the Hououin Kyouma personality as both a form of entertainment and a way to guise his insecurities. As he experiments with time travel, he learns that he is the only one who possesses the ability to determine changes between different timelines, which he dubs "Reading Steiner"; the reasoning behind this is never explained in-universe, although it is implied that a fever he had as a child during the Y2K crisis had something to do with it.
Kurisu Makise (牧瀬 紅莉栖, Makise Kurisu)
Kurisu is the main heroine of the game and Lab Member No. 004. She is an 18-year-old neuroscience researcher at an American university who can speak and read English well. Having had her research published in the academic journal Science at this age, Kurisu is extremely talented. She had skipped a grade in the American school system. Okabe simply tends to call her assistant (助手, joshu) or one of the several nicknames he comes up with, such as "Christina" (クリスティーナ, Kurisutīna), "the Zombie", and "Celeb Sev", which bugs her to varying degrees. She is something of a mild tsundere, although she will object to it whenever someone (usually Itaru) calls her that. She does not get along with her father and has not spoken to him in many years. She posts on @chan (the game's in-universe version of 2channel) under the name "KuriGohan and Kamehameha"; the alias also makes a cameo on Kaito Yashio's PokeCom tablet in episode 9 of Robotics;Notes.
Mayuri "Mayushii" Shiina (椎名 まゆり, Shiina Mayuri)
Mayuri is a long-time childhood best friend of Okabe and is a bit of an airhead, as well as Lab Member No. 002. Mayuri enjoys creating cosplay costumes and has a part-time job at a maid café called "MayQueen NyanNyan". She often calls herself Mayushii (まゆしぃ), a portmanteau of her given name and surname, which is also what Itaru calls her. She has a distinctive sing-song way of speaking, and she typically sings tutturū (トゥットゥルー) when she arrives or introduces herself. Several years prior she lost her grandmother under unknown circumstances, and to prevent her from succumbing to grief, Okabe declared her his "hostage", his entire eccentric persona being for her sake. She is 16 years old and she is a second-year at a private university preparatory school.
Itaru "Daru" Hashida (橋田 至, Hashida Itaru)
Itaru is an experienced hacker who has known Okabe since high school and is Lab Member No. 003. He is very skilled in computer programming and with old and new computer hardware. He is also well-versed in things on otaku culture. Okabe and Mayuri refer to him by the nickname "Daru" (ダル), a portmanteau of his given name and surname. Okabe sometimes also calls him Super Hacka (スーパーハカー, Sūpā Hakā), mispronouncing the word "hacker" (ハッカー, hakkā) to his chagrin. He is 19 years old and, like Okabe, is a first-year student at Tokyo Denki University. He appears in Robotics;Notes as DaSH, and as a main character in its sequel, Robotics;Notes DaSH.
Moeka Kiryu (桐生 萌郁, Kiryu Moeka)
Moeka is a tech journalist searching for the IBN 5100 "retro PC", and is Lab Member No. 005. Moeka is extremely protective of her mobile phone and becomes agitated if someone tries to take it from her hands. She is very shy and prefers to talk to someone by sending them a text message instead of speaking, even if they are right in front of her. Okabe calls her "Shining Finger" (閃光の指圧師（シャイニング・フィンガー）, Shainingu Fingā). She is 20 years old.
Luka "Lukako" Urushibara (漆原 るか, Urushibara Luka)
Luka is a friend of Okabe and Lab Member No. 006. His appearance and mannerisms are quite feminine as a result of his upbringing. He is also a close friend and classmate of Mayuri, who often asks him to try on her cosplay costumes, but as he is quite shy, he generally refuses. Okabe calls him by a feminine nickname: Lukako (ルカ子), and thinks of Luka as his pupil. He is 16 years old.
Faris NyanNyan (フェイリス・ニャンニャン, Feirisu NyanNyan) / Rumiho Akiha (秋葉 留未穂, Akiha Rumiho)
Faris NyanNyan works at the maid cafe "MayQueen+Nyan²" (pronounced "Mayqueen Nyan Nyan"), the same maid cafe that Mayuri works at, and is the most popular waitress there, as well as Lab Member No. 007. Her real name is Akiha Rumiho. Her family owns Akihabara, and she was the driving force behind it becoming the city of moe and anime. She tends to add "meow" (ニャン, nyan) to her sentences. She is 17 years old.
Suzuha Amane (阿万音 鈴羽, Amane Suzuha)
Suzuha works part-time for the landlord of Okabe's apartment and is on a search for her father in Akihabara, and is Lab Member No. 008. She enjoys riding her bicycle and appears to be at odds with Kurisu for some reason. Later it is discovered that she is actually the time traveler known as John Titor, and the future daughter of Itaru, her real name being Suzu Hashida (橋田 鈴, Hashida Suzu). She is 18 years old. She is the main protagonist of the side-story manga, Steins;Gate: Bōkan no Rebellion.
Yugo Tennouji (天王寺 裕吾, Tennōji Yugo)
Yugo is Okabe's landlord, who owns a TV repair store beneath his apartment, living with his daughter, Nae. Okabe gives him the nickname "Mr. Braun" due to his passion for CRT TVs (known in Japan as "Braun-tube TVs"). He is usually rough and impatient, especially when interacting with Okabe, but acts dotingly over his daughter and his TVs. He is the protagonist of the side-story manga, Steins;Gate: Onshū no Braunian Motion.
Nae Tennouji (天王寺 綯, Tennōji Nae)
Yugo's daughter who lives with him in the TV repair store and gets along well with Mayuri and Suzuha, but is afraid of Okabe. She later appears in Robotics;Notes as a member of JAXA.
Doctor Nakabachi (ドクター中鉢, Dokutā Nakabachi)
Kurisu's father and the overarching antagonist of the series. His obsession to outshine his daughter in the field of science ends up leading into World War III. His real name is Shouichi Makise (牧瀬 章一, Makise Shouichi).

=== Plot ===
==== True End route ====
The following summary is based upon the True End route.

Steins;Gate takes place in the Akihabara district of Tokyo. On July 28, 2010, Okabe Rintaro and his friend Shiina Mayuri head towards the Radio Kaikan building for a conference, where Okabe finds a girl named Makise Kurisu lying in a pool of blood. As Okabe sends a text message about the incident to his friend, Hashida "Daru" Itaru, he experiences a strange phenomenon and the people around him disappear, with no one else noticing anything had changed. After later running into Kurisu, who is strangely alive and well, and discovering the message he had sent to Itaru had arrived a week before he sent it, Okabe soon deduces that the 'PhoneWave' he and his friends had been developing is, in fact, a time machine capable of sending text messages to the past. He and his friends soon learn that SERN (based on the real-life CERN), an organization that has been researching time travel for some time, has actually succeeded in sending humans into the past, although they seem to have all resulted in the test subjects' deaths. Okabe begins experimenting with "D-Mails" (Dメール, D mēru; short for DeLorean mail), which begin to cause major differences in the timeline. Kurisu also manages to create a device to send a person's memories through the microwave, allowing that person to effectively leap into the past.

However, SERN learns of the time machine and sends a group led by Moeka to retrieve it and killing Mayuri in the process. Using Kurisu's time leap machine, Okabe travels back in time numerous times to try to save Mayuri, but to no avail. As Okabe reaches wit's end, he is approached by Amane Suzuha, a girl from a future ruled by SERN due to their possession of a time machine, who tells him that he needs to return to a Beta worldline in which Mayuri won't die. By undoing the effects of the D-Mails that caused shifts in the timeline, Okabe regains possession of an IBN 5100 PC that they lost earlier, allowing them to crack into SERN's systems and delete the evidence of Okabe's original D-Mail. However, Okabe realizes that by doing so, he would have to return to a world line in which Kurisu is dead. After realizing their feelings for each other, Kurisu tells Okabe to save Mayuri. Reluctantly, Okabe agrees and deletes the evidence of his D-Mail from SERN's database, returning him to the Beta world line, where Kurisu died as she did at the start of the story, and the rest of the cast, sans Okabe, do not remember that anything had happened.

A couple days later, an alternate world line variant of Suzuha appears before Okabe, having arrived in a time machine from the future. She tells Okabe that the only way to prevent World War III in the future is to prevent Kurisu's death at the hands of her father, Dr. Nakabachi, who stole her time travel theory to publish it under his own name. However, this operation ends in a disaster as Okabe ends up killing Kurisu himself by mistake. After this failure, Okabe receives a message from his future self, telling him that the way to save Kurisu without altering the events that led to him developing a time machine is to fool his past self into believing Kurisu had been killed and thus achieving the final divergence value of 1.048596%, which he dubs 'Steins Gate'. Returning to the past again, Okabe puts his own life in danger in order to save Kurisu's life, prevent Nakabachi from successfully escaping with the time travel theory, and fool his past self, setting him on his journey through time. After this, Okabe returns to the Steins Gate world line, safe from the threat of a third world war. Later, Okabe and Kurisu manage to reunite by chance (or by fate) in the streets of Akihabara, with Kurisu appearing to possess some lingering memories of their history together.

==== Alternate endings ====
The player's choices throughout the game results in alternate endings.

- In the Amane Suzuha Ending, Okabe decides to not send the D-Mail that would prevent him from pursuing Suzuha. To prevent Mayuri's death, he re-lives the final two days before her murder through constant time-leaping. After countless leaps, Okabe loses all emotion and personality due to re-living the same two days for all eternity. Eventually, Suzuha notices Okabe's behavior. She tells him that he will slowly "die" on the inside, and the world's set divergence will continue as planned. Both of them decide to travel to the past together and vow to stop SERN's dystopian future, despite the possibility of both losing their memories on arrival.
- In the Faris NyanNyan Ending, Okabe decides to not send the D-Mail that results in the death of Faris's father to try to stop the loss of the IBN 5100 computer. He instead sends a different D-Mail in an attempt to convince Faris's father to not part with the IBN computer. Beyond 1% divergence is achieved, but the divergence meter gives a strange output and none of Okabe's friends have any memories of him. In this worldline, Okabe and Faris are a couple and live together, participating in RaiNet Access Battlers card game tournaments. Although disappointed that none of his friends remember him, Okabe is still satisfied that he was able to prevent Mayuri's death. He decides to build a new life with Faris at his side.
- In the Urushibara Luka Ending, Okabe decides to not send the D-Mail that reverts Luka to a guy. He fully accepts Mayuri's expected death and makes no more attempts to save her and they spend the last two days together before she dies of a heart attack. Okabe and Luka decide to spend the rest of their lives together, both of them sharing a pang of guilt and sadness that only they would understand. In a post-credit scene they are revealed to now have a child together.
- In the Shiina Mayuri Ending, Okabe must choose between saving Mayuri or Kurisu. Realizing that he harbors romantic feelings for Mayuri, Okabe and Kurisu decide to return to the Beta worldline in which Kurisu's murder continues as planned. After hacking into SERN's database with the IBN computer, a 1% divergence is achieved. Okabe vows to remember his memories of Kurisu and spends his time with Mayuri as lovers.
- The Makise Kurisu Ending follows a similar route to the True End. To achieve this ending, one must have had several conversations with Kurisu throughout the game. Doing so allows Okabe and Kurisu to realize their inner feelings for each other. Unlike the True End, Kurisu's death is not prevented after the credits; Suzuha never returns and it is implied that this world will eventually meet the fate of World War III.

== Production ==
=== Development ===
Steins;Gate is the second collaborative work between 5pb. and Nitroplus after Chaos;Head. The game was created with the concept of "99% science and 1% fantasy" in mind. The planning for Steins;Gate was headed by Chiyomaru Shikura of 5pb. The characters were designed by Ryohei Fuke, also known as 'Huke' (one of the illustrators of the Metal Gear series, and the creator of the Black Rock Shooter franchise) whereas the gadgets were designed by Sh@rp. Naotaka Hayashi of 5pb. wrote the scenario with assistance from Vio Shimokura of Nitroplus. Tatsuya Matsuhara from 5pb. was the producer and Tosō Pehara from Nitroplus was the art director. The music was composed by Takeshi Abo of 5pb. and Toshimichi Isoe of Zizz Studio. Shikura, Hayashi, Matsuhara, Abo, and Isoe had all previously worked on Chaos;Head. The title "Steins;Gate" had no specific meaning, being coined from the German word "Stein" meaning stone, and tying in with famous physicist Albert Einstein. Matsuhara, who came up with the concept of the phone trigger system, stated that he initially wanted to incorporate the player's own mobile phone into the system. However, the idea was abandoned due to concerns that it might clash with Japan's privacy laws. When asked if the phone trigger system would be used in a possible sequel to the game, Hayashi stated that he hoped this would not be the case and recalled saying "who thought of this system!" while writing the contents of the text messages. While Shikura did not directly contribute to the script itself, Hayashi stated that Shikura helped with the overall plot and provided assistance with the second half of the story. In particular, Shikura helped a lot with the time-traveling aspects of the story. Hayashi stated that while he did not want the script to repeat the same text over and over again, it was ultimately unavoidable due to the player having to travel back in time so he tried to emphasize the overall tempo of the plot's development and how the plot unfolded. With regards to the theme of time traveling, Hayashi had felt that it seemed like an overdone topic and expressed concern over it when he first heard the idea from Shikura.

Prior to the game's announcement, a teaser site was featured on 5pb.'s website that simply referred to the game as Project S;G and stating that it was going to be a collaboration between 5pb. and Nitroplus. Nitroplus's website had also hinted at this on its 10th anniversary website. Matsuhara, who was also the producer for Chaos;Head, had previously stated that the game would be centred on Akihabara and that the project with Nitroplus would be the second part in a series around the theme "Science Novels (科学ノベル, Kagaku Noberu)". On June 12, 2009, the countdown expired and the name Steins;Gate was revealed. Kana Hanazawa stated that she was happy to have been selected to be in Steins;Gate as she felt that it was not common to be able to play a part in a serious game. She also thought that the game gives the player more of a thrilling sensation rather than a frightening one and it entices the player to continue reading.

=== Inspiration ===
Steins;Gate was inspired by earlier visual novels written by Hiroyuki Kanno. These include Eve Burst Error (1995), and most notably the time-travel adventure YU-NO: A Girl Who Chants Love at the Bound of this World (1996).

== Release history ==
Steins;Gate was first declared gold on September 18, 2009; with a demo of the game being made available a few weeks later on the Xbox Live Marketplace on October 7, 2009; for Xbox Live Gold members and then publicly on October 14, 2009. The demo allows the player to play through the prologue and the game's first chapter. Steins;Gate was released in both limited and regular editions on October 15, 2009. The limited edition contained the game itself, a toy named "Future Gadget #3 Lie Detector" from the game and a small hardcover art book that includes various illustrations and background information about the game's universe as well as comments from the staff members. A Windows port of the game was released on August 26, 2010, and included additional CGs. A PlayStation Portable port of the game was released on June 23, 2011. The game includes elements from the downloadable contents of the Xbox 360 version as well as a new opening movie, a new opening theme and a new ending theme. The game was also released for Apple iOS devices on August 25, 2011. The ports of the game for PlayStation 3 and PlayStation Vita, that shared a new opening movie, were released alongside the spin-off Steins;Gate: Darling of Loving Vows on May 24, 2012, and March 14, 2013, respectively. The Limited Edition of the Vita port came with a costume for the character Urushibara Luka. All copies came with a free movie ticket for the upcoming film. The PlayStation 4 version featuring higher quality assets then the previous releases, titled Steins;Gate HD was included with the first-print copies of Steins;Gate 0 in Japan. The Xbox 360 version became playable on Xbox One through backward compatibility on May 19, 2017, along with the spin-offs Steins;Gate: Darling of Loving Vows and Steins;Gate: Linear Bounded Phenogram.

At Anime Expo 2013, JAST USA announced that they would be licensing the PC version of the game in North America. The game was released on March 31, 2014, in a Limited Edition, as well as digitally. The Limited Edition contained a deluxe collector's box, a fan book with artwork, a set of replica Future Gadget Laboratory pins, the manual, and game disc. A physical Standard Edition later followed. On December 16, 2014, PQube announced they would release the PlayStation 3 and PlayStation Vita versions of the game in North America and Europe in 2015. Physical versions were exclusive to Amazon.com in the United States, while in Canada, they were only available at VideoGamesPlus.ca. The PC version was made available on Steam on September 9, 2016. The iOS version was released in English on September 9, 2016. On May 1, 2018, Spike Chunsoft took over publishing of the Steam version of the game from Mages/5pb.

== Reception ==
Reception

Aggregate scores
Aggregator	Score
Metacritic	PC: 87/100; PS3: 83/100; VITA: 83/100
OpenCritic	100 %

Review scores
Publication	Score
Destructoid	8/10
Edge	7/10
Eurogamer	5/5
Famitsu	34/40 (9, 9, 7, 9)
G4	10/10
GamesMaster	86%
GamesTM	8/10
Hardcore Gamer	4/5
IGN	6.9/10
PlayStation Official Magazine – UK	9/10
The Guardian	4/5
TouchArcade	iOS: 4.5/5
Dealspwn	10/10
Digitally Downloaded	5/5
GAMERamble	9/10
Kotaku	9.75/10
RPGFan	91%
The Vita Lounge	5/5
Vandal	9.2/10

Awards
Publication	Award
Famitsu Award	Game of Excellence
Famitsu	Best Adventure Game of All Time, 6th Most Tear-Inducing Game of All Time
Golden Joystick Award	Best Handheld / Mobile Game (Nomination)

=== Reviews ===
In 2009, the Famitsu Awards gave Steins;Gate visual novel an annual Game of Excellence award. In 2011, it was voted #6 in Famitsu's poll of "most tear-inducing games" of all time. Steins;Gate was nominated for the 2015 Golden Joystick Award in the "Best Handheld / Mobile Game" category. In 2017, Famitsu readers voted it the best adventure game of all time.

Senji Ishii of Famitsu Xbox 360 praised the scenario for its detail and noted that events that were overlooked as insignificant later returned to affect events of the future. Due to the way the plot ties the many different events of the game together, Ishii believes it must have been a lot of work to write the scenarios. 4Gamer.net commented that Steins;Gate is comparable to 428: Shibuya Scramble and felt that it is a gem that has not been seen in recent years. ITmedia Gamez noted that players should be attentive to all the details in the story as the twists will surprise the player in many different ways. It was also suggested to the player that the characters' voices be left turned on as the voice acting is very good. The review did caution that players who have played through the demo and who did not enjoy the atmosphere of the game were not likely to find the rest of the game interesting. Steins;Gate has also been praised by Square Enix producer Tomoya Asano, who described it as having "appealing and likable characters and a scenario that surprised players"; this led to Steins;Gate writer Naotaka Hayashi writing the plot and characters for the role-playing video game Bravely Default: Flying Fairy.

The later English release of the Steins;Gate visual novel has also been well-received. On Metacritic, it is the seventh highest-rated PC game of 2014, and the highest-rated PS Vita game of 2015. USgamer also gave it a perfect 5 out of 5 stars, concluding that it makes "excellent use of the visual novel medium to tell its story" and "is a beautifully crafted piece of interactive fiction that blends character drama, sci-fi and critique of popular culture into a compelling and memorable whole." GameFan praised the plot as "outstanding", "well written" and "the best storyline in a game released this year, period." They stated the "twists and turns, branching plot points, multiple endings and plot development is amazing" and "an interesting phone-based choice system makes the game feel far more engaging than similar games in the genre". Dealspwn praised the plot, characters, artwork, "excellent" writing and localisation, and the phone trigger system for giving "real choices with huge consequences", and mentioned its technical jargon. GamesMaster said it was smart, "with an unforgettable protagonist", and is one "of the great visual novels." Syfy called it one "of the best Visual Novels of all time," stating that, while "bad guys exist," "by trying to save the future, you become one yourself", making "choices whose devastating consequences you couldn't predict." Official PlayStation Magazine said "it's a story you'll want to see through." Meghan Sullivan of IGN gave it a generally favorable review, praising the story, characters, choices, and endings.

=== Sales ===
Steins;Gate placed 13th in sales during its first week of release with 16,434 copies sold, 28th on its second week with 4,253 copies, and 26th on its third week with 6,095 copies, totaling 26,782 copies by October 29, 2009. Steins;Gate placed fourth in overall Xbox 360 game sales on Amazon Japan on the year starting on December 1, 2008, and ending November 30, 2009. The PSP version of Steins;Gate debuted at 2nd place on the Japanese game charts, selling 63,558 units in its first week. As of June 2011, 300,000 copies have been shipped across the PC, Xbox 360 and PSP platforms. As of 2014, Steins;Gate sold over 500,000 copies. On the UK charts, as of June 8, 2015, Steins;Gate topped the PlayStation Vita chart, came third place on the PlayStation 3 chart, and entered at #18 on the All-Format chart. The Android version has sold between 50,000 and 100,000 downloads, as of 2015. As of December 2015, the Steins Gate visual novel series has sold more than one million copies, including 100,000 copies of Steins;Gate 0. The Steam release had an estimated total of 160,000 players by July 2018.

== Related media ==
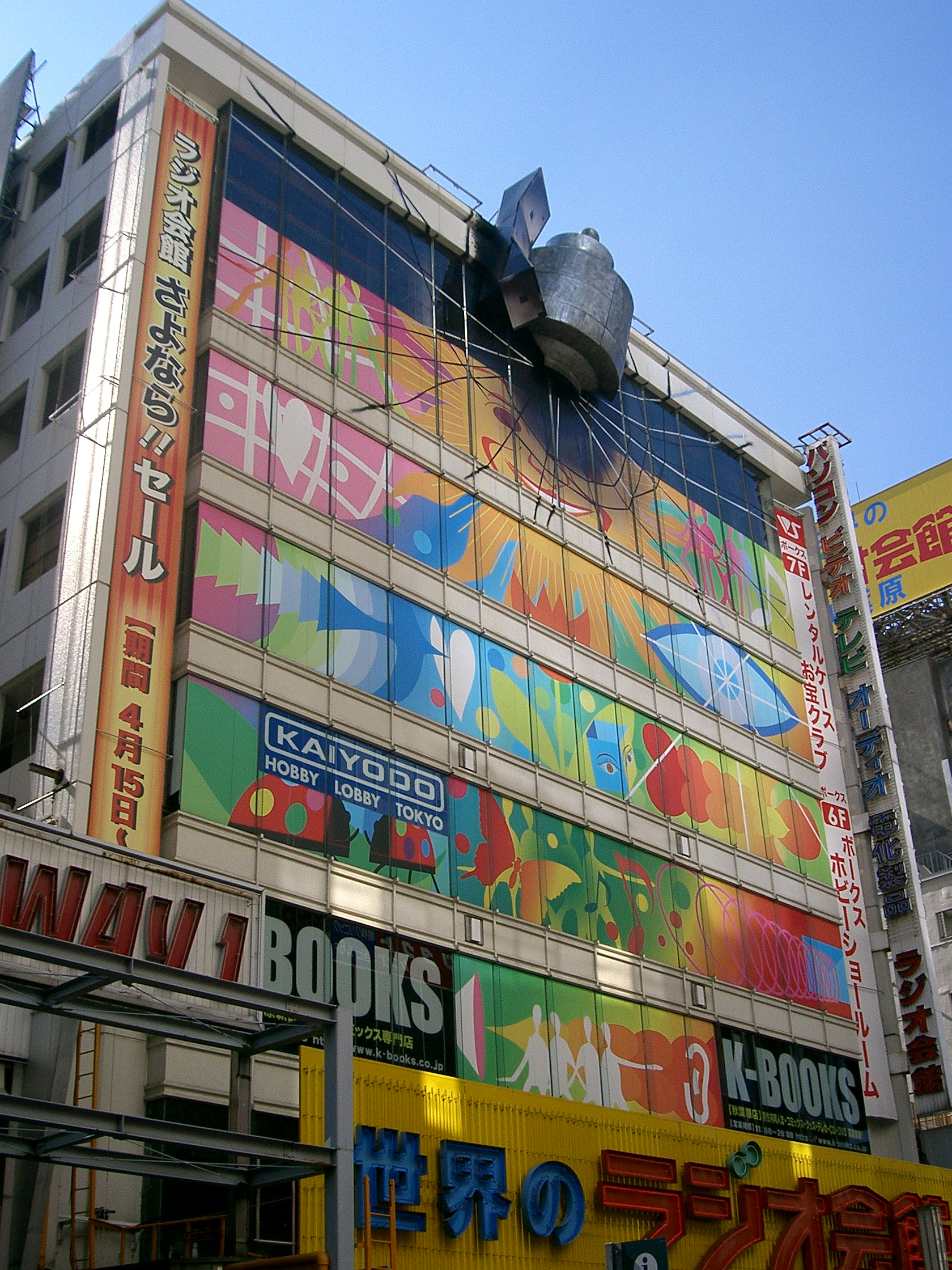
A promotional model of the crashed time machine on the real life Radio Kaikan building in Akihabara in October 2011

=== Video games ===
The success of Steins;Gate spawned additional sequels. Steins;Gate: Hiyoku Renri no Darling was released on June 6, 2011, and is similar to Chaos;Head Love Chu Chu! in terms of style. The story for this sequel is unrelated and non-canon to the original game, and is more comedic in tone. It was originally an Xbox 360 exclusive, though ports later followed for PS3, PSP, and PlayStation Vita. A version for iOS was later released on October 3, 2013, as well. Another game, Steins;Gate: Linear Bounded Phenogram, was released on April 25, 2013.

Steins;Gate: Octet of Shifting Space is a non-canon extension of the True End of the original game. Unlike the modern visual novel format of the original game, this retro game mimics the style of graphical text adventure games from the 8-bit PC era (e.g. PC-88), with the player typing short commands to interact with and explore the game world. It features all backgrounds and characters drawn in a low-color pixelated style with emulated scanlines, and chiptune music played through an emulated FM chip with no voice acting. The premise of the game features Okabe Rintaro receiving a D-Mail from himself in 2025 that states that he must save the future by reclaiming an IBN 5100 from a person under the alias "Neidhardt". This person is Takumi Nishijō, the protagonist of Chaos;Head, as he runs under the same player name in his favorite MMORPG, and the D-Mail stating that "Neidhardt" lives in Shibuya and has "inherent, supernatural abilities", a reference to his power as a megalomaniac. Although non-canon, the game contains many easter eggs and references that connect Chaos;Head and Steins;Gate together. The game was released on October 28, 2011, as a PC exclusive. A game demo is currently available. An official manga adaptation of the game's story has also been released. The game will be released in the west on PC, Nintendo Switch, Nintendo Switch 2 and Playstation 5 at an unspecified date.

A third spin-off game titled Steins;Gate Senkei Kōsoku no Phenogram, was released on April 25, 2013, in Japan for Xbox 360 and PlayStation 3. The game offers alternative stories that vary in terms of canon, some from the viewpoint of other lab members besides Okabe. A PlayStation Vita port of the game was released on November 28, 2013.

A sequel, Steins;Gate 0, was announced in March 2015. The game was released on PlayStation 3, PlayStation 4 and PlayStation Vita. It was originally scheduled to be released in Japan on November 19, 2015, but the release date was moved to December 10, 2015. Another sequel, tentatively referred to as Steins;???, was announced in October 2020.

An updated version of Steins;Gate, titled Steins;Gate Elite, was released in 2018 in Japan for PlayStation 4, PlayStation Vita and Nintendo Switch. Unlike previous Science Adventure games, it is fully animated, using all the footage from the Steins;Gate anime series along with newly produced animation for most story routes not included in the anime series; the animation is played together with the script and voiced dialogue from the original game. The new animation is produced by White Fox, the studio that produced the anime series.

Another updated version of Steins;Gate, titled Steins;Gate RE:BOOT, was released on Steam in August 2026; releases for Nintendo Switch, Nintendo Switch 2, PlayStation 5, and Xbox Series X|S consoles followed in October that year. The game features re-recorded voice acting, updated art and visuals, newly-animated character sprites, and a new ending/route focused around one of the characters, Kiryuu Moeka.

=== Internet radio show ===
An Internet radio show to promote Steins;Gate named "Steins;Gate Radio Future Gadget Radio Show (Steins;Gate ラジオ 未来ガジェット電波局, Steins;Gate Rajio Mirai Gajetto Denpakyoku)" began broadcasting on September 11, 2009. The show was streamed online on every Friday, and was produced by HiBiKi Radio Station. The show was hosted by Asami Imai, the voice actress of Makise Kurisu, and Kana Hanazawa, the voice actress of Shiina Mayuri. Guests that appeared on the show included Yū Kobayashi, the voice actress of Urushibara Luka, and Ayano Yamamoto, the voice actress of Tennouji Nae (天王寺綯). The last show was aired on October 30, 2009. A CD containing a special Comiket show with Haruko Momoi, the voice actress of Faris NyanNyan, as the guest was released on December 29, 2009. A collection of all eight broadcast Internet radio shows, the Comiket show, and one new show was released on February 3, 2010, in a bundle together with the soundtrack of the game. The Internet radio shows are recorded in MP3 format.

=== Manga ===
A manga adaptation of the game, titled Steins;Gate, was created by Yomi Sarachi and serialized by Media Factory in their Monthly Comic Alive from 2009 to 2013, and later published in North America by Udon Entertainment from 2015 to 2016.

Four side-story manga series are currently being serialized. Steins;Gate: Bōkan no Rebellion (STEINS;GATE 亡環のリベリオン, Shutainzu Gēto Bōkan no Reberion; "Steins;Gate: Death Ring Rebellion"), illustrated by Kenji Mizuta, began serialization in Mag Garden's Monthly Comic Blade's February 2010 issue. The manga focuses on Amane Suzuha as it tells the events of the story from her point of view. Steins;Gate: Onshū no Braunian Motion (STEINS;GATE 恩讐のブラウニアンモーション, Shutainzu Gēto Onshū no Buraunian Mōshon; "Steins;Gate: Love/Hate Braunian Motion), illustrated by Takeshi Mizoguchi, began serialization in Famitsu's Comic Clear web magazine and it takes the point of view of Tennouji Yugo. Steins;Gate: Shijō Saikyō no Slight Fever (STEINS;GATE 史上最強のスライトフィーバー, Shutainzu Gēto Shijō Saikyō no Suraito Fībā; "Steins;Gate: The World's Strongest Slight Fever"), illustrated by Yuzuhana Morita, began serialization in Kadokawa Shoten's Comptiq's February 2011 issue and was transferred to Monthly Shōnen Ace in its October 2011 issue. The manga focuses on the main heroine Makise Kurisu as the events are told from her point of view. Another manga, titled Steins;Gate: Hiyoku Renri no Sweets Honey (STEINS;GATE 比翼恋理のスイーツはにー, Shutainzu Gēto Hiyoku Renri no Suītsu Hanī) started serializing on Comic Blade in its August 2011 issue. It follows the events told in the fan disc. A manga adaptation of the drama CD, Steins;Gate: Aishin Meizu no Babel (STEINS;GATE 哀心迷図のバベル, Shutainzu Gēto Aishin Meizu no Baberu), also told from Kurisu's perspective, is being illustrated by Shinichirou Nariie and was serialized in Shueisha's Ultra Jump magazine from May 15, 2012, to January 19, 2014.

A spinoff comedy manga, titled Steins;Gate! (しゅたいんず・げーと), was illustrated by Nini and serialized in Media Factory's Monthly Comic Alive's March 2011 issue.

A book containing information and designs of Steins;Gate was published by Enterbrain on February 26, 2010.

=== Light novel ===
A light novel sequel, set 6 years after the events of the original game and titled Steins;Gate: The Committee of Antimatter, was to ship on January 16, 2015. However, due to "various circumstances", it was announced on December 22, 2014, that its release was cancelled.

=== Drama CDs ===
Three drama CDs were released on March 31, 2010, April 28, 2010, and June 2, 2010, respectively. The first drama CD takes place in the tenth chapter of Kurisu's route.

=== Anime series ===
On July 25, 2010, Chiyomaru Shikura announced on his Twitter account that Steins;Gate would be adapted into an anime television series. Further details about the adaptation were revealed in the September 2010 issues of Newtype and Comptiq. The adaptation was produced by White Fox; and aired in Japan between April 6 and September 14, 2011. The entire series was released in Japan on nine DVD/Blu-ray combo packs. Each set features 2–3 episodes, an art book, and a bonus disc containing music and radio dramas by the Japanese voice cast. An OVA episode was released with the final DVD/BD volume on February 22, 2012. The adaptation was directed by Hiroshi Hamasaki and Takuya Satō, with series composition by Jukki Hanada and music by Takeshi Abo and Murakami Jun. Funimation has licensed the series in North America and released the series in two Blu-ray/DVD combo sets, on September 25, 2012, and December 18, 2012, respectively. Both box sets were compiled into a complete series Blu-ray/DVD box set as part of Funimation's "Anime Classics" line of releases. It was released on September 30, 2014. Manga Entertainment have licensed the series in the United Kingdom and released it in two parts on July 15, 2013, and September 30, 2013, respectively. A series of original net animation shorts, titled Steins;Gate - Sōmei Eichi no Cognitive Computing (シュタインズゲート 聡明叡智のコグニティブ・コンピューティング, Steins;Gate Cognitive Computing of Intelligent Wisdom), were released between October 14, 2014, and November 11, 2014, as part of a collaboration with IBM to promote cognitive computing.

An anime adaptation of Steins;Gate 0 has been released. To celebrate its release, an alternate version of episode 23 of the first season aired on December 2, 2015, as part of a rebroadcast of the series, depicting an alternate ending which leads into the events of Steins;Gate 0.

=== Theatrical film ===
A film, titled Steins;Gate: The Movie − Load Region of Déjà Vu, was announced at the end of the series. The movie, featuring an original storyline taking place after the events of the series, was released in Japanese theaters on April 20, 2013; and later on Blu-ray Disc and DVD on December 13, 2013.

=== Music ===
Steins;Gate has five main theme songs, the opening theme "Sky Clad Observer" (スカイクラッドの観測者, Sukai Kuraddo no Kansokusha), the first ending theme "Another Heaven", used for the true ending, the second ending theme "Unmei no Farfalla" (運命のファルファッラ, Unmei no Farufarra), used for the alternative endings, and the insert songs "Technovision" and "Masquerade". The third and fifth songs are sung by Yui Sakakibara while the other ones are sung by Kanako Itō. Itō's "Technovision" was included in her "Stargate" album which was released on August 26, 2009. "Sky Clad Observer" was composed by Chiyomaru Shikura and "Another Heaven" was composed by Yoshihiro Suda. The "Sky Clad Observer" single was released on October 28, 2009. Sakakibara's "Unmei no Farufarra" was composed by Tatsuhi Hayashi and the single was released on November 25, 2009. The PC version received a brand new opening song, "AR" sung by Kanako Itō. Similarly, the PSP and PS3 versions featured new songs as well, all sung by Itō. The opening songs were "Space Engineer" (宇宙エンジニア, Uchuu Engineer) and "Hisenkei Jeniakku" (非線形ジェニアック, Hisenkei Jeniakku), respectively. The PSP version received a new ending theme titled "In the Moonlit Night of Preghiera" (プレギエーラの月夜に, Preghiera no Tsukiyo Ni) sung by Yui Sakakibara. All these songs were released as separate singles, then eventually as a vocal collection on June 26, 2013. The composers for the background music consisted of Chiyomaru Shikura, AKIRASTAR, Takeshi Abo, Tatsushi Hayashi, and Yoshihiro Suda; all of whom had previously worked with 5pb on other titles. A soundtrack of the game was released on February 3, 2010, across two discs in a bundle of three that includes recorded episodes of the Internet radio show. All the background music of the game was included as well as shortened versions of the original Xbox 360 vocal tracks. The piano score for one of the tracks, "Gate of Steiner", was also included in the soundtrack. In episode 4, the song "Watashi☆LOVE na☆Otome!" by Afilia Saga East, who also sings the opening to the sequel game of Steins;Gate, can be heard. The PS3 Double Pack Collector's Edition, which contained the original Steins;Gate and Hiyoku Renri no Darling, shipped with a special bonus soundtrack entitled "Steins;Gate Symphonic Material." It collects ten arranged tracks from the game performed by a studio orchestra and was released on May 24, 2012. This release was later expanded upon and released commercially on a 2-disc set, as "Steins;Gate Symphonic Reunion" on September 25, 2013.

The anime features four pieces of theme music; the opening theme is "Hacking to the Gate" by Kanako Ito, the main ending theme is "Tokitsukasadoru Jūni no Meiyaku" (刻司ル十二ノ盟約) by Yui Sakakibara (in ending credits she is mentioned as FES from Chaos;Head "Phantasm" (ファンタズム) band), the ending themes of episode 23 and 24 are "Sukai Kuraddo no Kansokusha" (スカイクラッドの観測者) and "Another Heaven" both by Kanako Ito. The first two are original (created for anime series), and the ending themes for episodes 23 and 24 are adopted from the visual novel. The background music of the anime was composed by Takeshi Abo, Jun Murakami, and Yoshihiro Suda. It utilizes some themes that were taken directly from the game but also features original music performed by a studio orchestra. A soundtrack of the anime is not available commercially but was instead released across two discs that were included with the Japanese Blu-rays. The first album "Butterfly Effect" was released alongside Volume 2 on June 27, 2011 while the second album "Event Horizon" was released with Volume 8 on January 25, 2012.

=== Board game ===
A real-life version of the in-universe boardgame, RaiNet Access Battlers (雷ネットアクセスバトラーズ, Rainetto Akusesu Batorāzu), was made by GigasDrop and was released in Japan on December 28, 2011.

=== Live-action play ===
A live-action Steins;Gate play Living ADV: Steins;Gate finished its eight-day run in Tokyo's Zepp Diver City Theater on October 20, 2013.

=== Live-action TV series ===
A live-action television series based on Steins;Gate, produced by Skydance Television, was announced in January 2020 at the annual Science Adventure Live event, and is planned to be available worldwide.

== See also ==
- CERN
- Dystopia
- IBM 5100
- John Titor
