= List of Re:Zero volumes =

Re:Zero is a Japanese light novel series written by Tappei Nagatsuki and illustrated by Shinichirou Otsuka. The series has received three manga adaptations and a number of other spinoffs.

Re:Zero was originally a web novel serialized on the Shōsetsuka ni Narō website from April 2012, before being acquired for print publication by Media Factory, who published the first volume under their MF Bunko J imprint on January 24, 2014. Forty-six volumes have been published to date, as well as six side story novels and fourteen short story collections.

The series' first three arcs have been adapted into separate manga series. The first, by Daichi Matsue, was published by Media Factory between June 2014 and March 2015. The second, by Makoto Fugetsu, has been published by Square Enix since October 2014. Matsue launched the third adaptation, also published by Media Factory, in May 2015. Additionally, Media Factory published a manga anthology from June 2016 to March 2018.

Both the novels and the manga adaptations are published in North America by Yen Press, who announced the licenses on December 2, 2015.

== Light novels ==
=== Volumes ===
| No. | Original release date | Original ISBN | English release date | English ISBN |
|---|---|---|---|---|
Arc 1
| 1 | January 24, 2014 | 978-4-04-066208-4 | July 19, 2016 | 978-0-316-31530-2 |
Prologue: "The Waste Heat of the Beginning" (始まりの余熱, Hajimari no Yonetsu): 1. "The End of the Beginning" (始まりの終わり, Hajimari no Owari); 2. "A Struggle Too Late" (遅すぎる抗い, Oso Sugiru Aragai); 3. "Ending and Beginning" (終わりと始まり, Owari to Hajimari); 4. "Fourth Time's the Charm" (四度目の正直, Shi-dome no Shōjiki); 5. "Starting Life in Another World" (ゼロから始まる異世界生活, Zero kara Hajimaru Isekai Seikatsu); Epilogue: "The Moon Is Watching" (お月さまが見てる, O-tsuki-sama ga Miteru)
Arc 2
| 2 | February 25, 2014 | 978-4-04-066309-8 | November 15, 2016 | 978-0-316-39837-4 |
Prologue: "The Road to Redemption Begins" (贖いの始まり, Aganai no Hajimari): 1. "Self-Conscious Feelings" (自覚する感情, Jikaku Suru Kanjō); 2. "The Promised Morn Grows Distant" (約束した朝は遠く, Yakusoku Shita Asa wa Tōku); 3. "The Sound of the Chain" (鎖の音, Kusari no Oto); 4. "A Deadly Game of Tag" (逢魔時の鬼ごっこ, Ōmagatoki no Onigokko); 5. "The Morning He Yearned For" (待ち望んだ朝, Machi Nozonda Asa)
| 3 | March 25, 2014 | 978-4-04-066334-0 | March 21, 2017 | 978-0-316-39840-4 |
1. "Subaru Natsuki's Restart" (ナツキ・スバルのリスタート, Natsuki Subaru no Risutāto); 2. "I Cried and Screamed and Will Cry No More" (泣いて泣き喚いて泣き止んだから, Naite Naki Wameite Naki Yanda kara); 3. "The Meaning of Courage" (勇気の意味, Yūki no Imi); 4. "The Demonic Method" (鬼がかったやり方, Oni Gakatta Yarikata); Interlude: "Rem" (レム, Remu): 5. "All In" (オールイン, Ōru In); Epilogue: "Talking About the Future" (未来の話, Mirai no Hanashi) Interlude: "A Private Chat Under the Moon" (月下の密談, Gekka no Mitsudan)
Arc 3
| 4 | June 25, 2014 | 978-4-04-066780-5 | June 20, 2017 | 978-0-316-39842-8 |
Prologue: "A Fool and His Stubbornness" (愚か者の意地, Orokamono no Iji): 1. "Return to the Royal Capital" (再来の王都, Sairai no Ōto); 2. "Blessings, Reunions, and Promises" (加護と再会と約束と, Kago to Saikai to Yakusoku to); 3. "On the Very Worst of Terms" (仲の悪すぎる面子, Naka no Waru Sugiru Mentsu); 4. "The Candidates for the Throne and Their Knights" (王の候補者と、その騎士たち, Ō no Kōho-sha to Sono Kishi-tachi); 5. "Subaru Natsuki, the Self-Declared Knight" (自称騎士、ナツキ・スバル, Jishō Kishi Natsuki Subaru); Epilogue: "Knightly Expectations" (騎士たちの思惑, Kishi-tachi no Omowaku)
| 5 | October 24, 2014 | 978-4-04-067122-2 | October 31, 2017 | 978-0-316-39845-9 |
Prologue: "And His Name Is—" (その名は—, Sono Na wa—): 1. "A Decaying Mind" (腐敗する精神, Fuhai Suru Seishin); 2. "Events in Motion, and Rem's Decision" (動き出す事態とレムの意思, Ugokidasu Jitai to Remu no Ishi); 3. "A Disease Called Despair" (絶望という病, Zetsubō to Iu Yamai); 4. "On the Periphery of Madness" (狂気の外側, Kyōki no Sotogawa); 5. "Acedia" (怠惰, Taida)
| 6 | March 25, 2015 | 978-4-04-067468-1 | February 27, 2018 | 978-0-316-39847-3 |
1. "Immature Negotiations" (幼い交渉, Osanai Kōshō); 2. "A Pig's Greed" (豚の欲望, Buta no Yokubō); 3. "The Maw of the White Whale" (白鯨の顎, Hakugei no Ago); 4. "Won't Let Me Say the Words" (言葉にはさせない, Kotoba ni wa Sasenai); 5. "From Zero" (ゼロから, Zero kara); 6. "The Card That's Been Dealt" (配られたカード, Kubarareta Kādo)
| 7 | September 25, 2015 | 978-4-04-067780-4 | June 26, 2018 | 978-0-316-39849-7 |
1. "The Dealt Card" (配られたカード, Kubarareta Kādo); 2. "Eve of the Decisive Battle" (決戦前夜, Kessen Zen'ya); 3. "The Battle of the White Whale" (白鯨攻略戦, Hakugei Kōryaku-sen); 4. "A Gamble to Resist Despair" (絶望に抗う賭け, Zetsubō ni Aragau Kake); 5. "Wilhelm van Astrea" (ヴィルヘルム・ヴォン・アストレア, Viruherumu Von Asutorea); 6. "The Road to the Mathers Domain" (メイザース領への道, Meizāsu-ryō e no Michi)
| 8 | March 25, 2016 | 978-4-04-068177-1 | October 30, 2018 | 978-1-9753-0193-4 |
1. "A Beeline Toward Sloth" (怠惰一閃, Taida Issen); 2. "— Fight" (— 戦え, — Tatakae); 3. "The Meaning of Having Returned" (帰ってきた意味, Kaettekita Imi); 4. "A Crafty Sloth" (悪辣なる怠惰, Akuratsu Naru Taida); 5. "A Pact Fulfilled" (契約の履行, Keiyaku no Rikō)
| 9 | September 23, 2016 | 978-4-04-068627-1 | February 19, 2019 | 978-1-9753-5629-3 |
Prologue: "Re:Start" (Re：スタート, Re: Sutāto): 1. "The Gospel Known as Warmth" (温もりという福音, Nukumori to Iu Fukuin); 2. "Setting the Stage" (お膳立ての舞台裏, Ozendate no Butaiura); 3. "The Self-Declared Knight and 'The Finest of Knights'" (自称騎士と最優の騎士, Jishō Kishi to Saiyū no Kishi); 4. "The End of Sloth" (怠惰の終焉, Taida no Shūen); 5. "— A Tale About That, and Nothing More" (— ただそれだけの物語, — Tada Soredake no Monogatari); Interlude: "A Brief Moment in a Dragon Carriage" (竜車でのひと時, Ryūsha de no Hitotoki) Fragments: "Rem Natsuki" (ナツキ・レム, Natsuki Remu) Interlude: "Let Us Feast" (イタダキマス, Itadakimasu): 6. "To Each Their Vows" (それぞれの、誓い, Sorezore no Chikai)
Arc 4
| 10 | October 25, 2016 | 978-4-04-068676-9 | June 18, 2019 | 978-1-9753-8316-9 |
Prologue: "Tomb" (墓所, Bosho): 1. "At the Place of Return" (帰り着いた場所へ, Kaeritsuita Basho e); 2. "The Road to the Sanctuary" (聖域への道中, Seiiki e no Douchū); 3. "A Long-Awaited Reunion" (待ちかねた再会, Machikaneta Saikai); 4. "Parent and Child" (親子, Oyako); 5. "The First Step Forward" (踏み出した一歩, Fumidashita Ippo)
| 11 | December 23, 2016 | 978-4-04-068770-4 | December 3, 2019 | 978-1-9753-8318-3 |
1. "Maid, Maid, Maid" (メイド・メイド・メイド, Meido Meido Meido); 2. "Girl's Gospel" (少女の福音, Shōjo no Fukuin); 3. "Friend" (ユージン, Yūjin); 4. "The Value of a Life" (命の価値, Inochi no Kachi); 5. "The Witches' Tea Party" (魔女達の茶会, Majo-tachi no Chakai); 6. "Loveloveloveloveloveloveyou" (らぶらぶらぶらぶらぶらぶゆー, Rabu Rabu Rabu Rabu Rabu Rabu Yū)
| 12 | March 25, 2017 | 978-4-04-069143-5 | February 25, 2020 | 978-1-9753-8320-6 |
1. "Loveloveloveloveloveloveloveloveloveloveloveloveme" (らぶらぶらぶらぶらぶらぶらぶらぶらぶらぶらぶらぶらぶらぶみー, Rabu Rabu Rabu Rabu Rabu Rabu Rabu Rabu Rabu Rabu Rabu Rabu Rabu Rabu Mī); 2. "I've Already Seen Hell" (地獄なら知っている, Jigoku Nara Shitteiru); 3. "A Four-Hundred-Year-Old Cry" (四百年前からの叫び, Yonhyakunen Mae kara no Sakebi); 4. "The Taste of Death" (死の味, Shi no Aji); 5. "Ending List" (えんでぃんぐりすと, Endingu Risuto); 6. "The Witches' Tea Party" (魔女の茶会, Majo no Chakai)
| 13 | June 24, 2017 | 978-4-0406-9285-2 | July 21, 2020 | 978-1-9753-8322-0 |
1. "The Sounds That Make You Want to Cry" (泣きたくなる音, Nakitaku Naru Oto); 2. "Ignoring the Odds" (勝算度外視, Shōsan Dogaishi); 3. "Straight Bet" (STRAIGHT BET); 4. "Lies, Liars, and Con Artists" (嘘と、嘘つきと、大法螺吹きと, Uso to Usotsuki to Ōborafuki to); 5. "Otto Suwen" (オットー・スーウェン, Ottō Sūwen); 6. "The Reason I Trust You" (信じる理由, Shinjiru Riyū); 7. "None Can Lift the Quain Stone Alone" (クウェインの石は一人じゃ上がらない, Kuwein no Ishi wa Hitori ja Agaranai); 8. "Love Letter" (らぶれたー, Rabu Retā)
| 14 | September 25, 2017 | 978-4-0406-9459-7 | October 20, 2020 | 978-1-9753-8324-4 |
1. "Journey of Memories" (— 記憶の旅路, — Kioku no Tabiji); 2. "The Beginning of the Sanctuary and of Ruin" (聖域の始まりと、崩壊の始まり, Seiiki no Hajimari to, Hōkai no Hajimari); 3. "The Day Alpha Orionis Laughed" (平家星の笑った日, Heikeboshi no Waratta Hi); 4. "The Eternal Freezing of the Great Elior Forest" (エリオール大森林の永久凍土, Eriōru Daishinrin no Eikyūtōdo); 5. "The Red Drained from Their Lips" (唇には紅を引いて, Kuchibiru ni wa Beni o Hiite); 6. "Lies to Hope" (嘘を願いに, Uso o Negai ni); 7. "A Howling Reunion" (咆哮の再会, Hōkō no Saikai)
| 15 | December 25, 2017 | 978-4-04-069611-9 | March 2, 2021 | 978-1-9753-8326-8 |
1. "The Final Day of Roswaal Manor" (ロズワール邸、最後の日, Rozuwāru-tei, Saigo no Hi); 2. "Happiness Reflected upon the Water's Surface" (水面に映る幸せ, Minamo ni Utsuru Shiawase); 3. "— Guiltylowe, Black King of the Forest, Strikes!!" (— 森の漆黒の王、ギルティラウの襲撃, — Mori no Shikkoku no Ō, Girutirau no Shūgeki); 4. "Next Time, I'm Sure We'll Have Tea" (次はきっとお茶会を, Tsugi wa Kitto Ochakai o); 5. "I Love You Down to Your Blood and Guts" (血と臓物まで愛して, Chi to Zōmotsu Made Aishite); 6. "It Started with Revenge" (復讐から始まり, Fukushū kara Hajimari); 7. "— Choose Me" (— 俺を選べ, — Ore o Erabe); 8. "Faces Fashioned from Snow" (雪の顔型, Yuki no Kao-gata); Closing Chapter: "Meeting Each Other Halfway" (それぞれの歩み寄り, Sorezore no Ayumiyori) Ending Chapter: "Offbeat Steps Under the Moonlight" (月下、出鱈目なステップ, Gekka, Detaramena Suteppu) Addendum: "— The Return" (— 再臨, — Sairin)
Arc 5
| 16 | March 24, 2018 | 978-4-04-069816-8 | June 22, 2021 | 978-1-9753-8328-2 |
1. "It Always Begins with a Visitor" (始まりはいつも来訪者から, Hajimari wa Itsumo Raihō-sha kara); 2. "The Water Gate City of Pristella" (水門都市プリステラ, Suimon Toshi Purisutera); 3. "An Unexpected, Unplanned Reunion Long in Coming" (意外な再会、来るべき再会、意図せぬ再会, Igaina Saikai, Kitarubeki Saikai, Ito Senu Saikai); 4. "Noisy Tranquility" (うるさい静寂, Urusai Shijima); 5. "Theatrical Malice" (劇場型悪意, Gekijō-gata Akui)
| 17 | September 25, 2018 | 978-4-04-065158-3 | November 9, 2021 | 978-1-9753-3525-0 |
1. "Casually Comparing Answers" (安易さの答え合わせ, An'i-sa no Kotae Awase); 2. "A Showdown of Fire and Ice" (氷炎の結末, Hyōen no Ketsumatsu); 3. "Witch Cult Disaster Response HQ" (魔女教災害対策本部, Majo Kyō Saigai Taisaku Honbu); 4. "Gorgeous Tiger" (ゴージャス・タイガー, Gōjasu Taigā); 5. "The Operation to Retake City Hall" (都市庁舎奪還作戦, Toshi Chōsha Dakkan Sakusen)
| 18 | December 25, 2018 | 978-4-04-065380-8 | February 22, 2022 | 978-1-9753-3527-4 |
Prologue: "A Dark Torrent" (濁流, Dakuryū): 1. "Picking Up the Pieces" (敗戦処理, Haisen Shori); 2. "What It Takes to Be a Knight" (騎士の条件, Kishi no Jōken); 3. "The Newest Hero and the Oldest Hero" (最も新しい英雄と最も古い英雄, Mottomo Atarashī Eiyū to Mottomo Furui Eiyū); 4. "The Stars Etched into History" (歴史刻む星々, Rekishi Kizamu Hoshiboshi); 5. "The Person I One Day Fall in Love With" (いつか好きになる人, Itsuka Sukininaru Hito)
| 19 | March 27, 2019 | 978-4-04-065628-1 | July 26, 2022 | 978-1-9753-3529-8 |
Prologue: "City Scramble" (混戦都市, Konsen Toshi): 1. "The Battle with Greed Begins" (強欲攻略戦開幕, Gōyoku Kōryaku-sen Kaimaku); 2. "Paean to a City in Flames" (炎上都市賛歌, Enjō Toshi Sanka); 3. "Sign the Divorce Papers" (絶縁状にサインを, Zetsuen-jō ni Sain o); 4. "Liliana Masquerade" (リリアナ・マスカレード, Ririana Masukarēdo); 5. "Believing" (— 信じてる, — Shinji Teru); 6. "Regulus Corneas" (レグルス・コルニアス, Regurusu Koruniasu)
| 20 | June 25, 2019 | 978-4-04-065795-0 | November 22, 2022 | 978-1-9753-3531-1 |
Prologue: "Moonlit Capriccio": 1. "A Hideous Banquet" (醜悪なる晩餐会, Shūakunaru Bansan-kai); 2. "The Territory Victim" (領域の被害者, Ryōiki no Higaisha); 3. "A Warrior's Acclaim" (戦士の称賛, Senshi no Shōsan); 4. "The Love Song of the Sword Devil — Fragment" (剣鬼恋歌 — 断章, Ken Oni Renka — Danshō); 5. "Theresia van Astrea" (テレシア・ヴァン・アストレア, Tereshia Van Asutorea); 6. "The Results of the Battle for Pristella" (プリステラ攻防戦リザルト, Purisutera Kōbō-sen Rizaruto); 7. "Ripples on the Surface" (水面に波紋を残して, Minamo ni Hamon o Nokoshite)
Arc 6
| 21 | September 25, 2019 | 978-4-04-064006-8 | March 21, 2023 | 978-1-9753-3533-5 |
Prologue: "On the Road" (旅の道中, Tabi no Dōchū): 1. "A Reason to Bring You" (君を連れ出す理由, Kimi o Tsuredasu Riyū); 2. "Overcome Sand Time!" (砂時間を越えろ!, Suna Jikan o Koero!); 3. "The Watchtower Baptism" (監視塔の洗礼, Kanshi-tō no Senrei); 4. "Trust on the Sands" (砂上の信頼, Sajō no Shinrai); 5. "The Watchtower Guardian" (監視塔の番人, Kanshi-tō no Ban'nin); Interlude: "Gorgeous Tiger Reloaded" (ゴージャス・タイガー・リローデッド, Gōjasu Taigā Rirōdeddo)
| 22 | March 25, 2020 | 978-4-04-064553-7 | June 20, 2023 | 978-1-9753-3535-9 |
1. "The Great Pleiades Library" (大図書館プレイアデス, Dai Toshokan Pureiadesu); 2. "A White Sky Asterism" (白い星空のアステリズム, Shiroi Hoshizora no Asuterizumu); 3. "The Taygeta Archive" (タイゲタの書庫, Taigeta no Shoko); 4. "Stick Swinger" (棒振り, Bōburi); 5. "Julius Juukulius" (ユリウス・ユークリウス, Yuriusu Yūkuriusu); 6. "Recommendations for Living Together in a Tower" (塔共同生活のすゝめ, Tō Kyōdō Seikatsu no Susume); 7. "■■■■■■" (■■■·■■■, ■■■·■■■); Interlude: "Old Memories" (— 古い記憶, — Furui Kioku)
| 23 | June 25, 2020 | 978-4-04-064730-2 | October 24, 2023 | 978-1-9753-3537-3 |
1. "Walking out of a Convenience Store and into a Mysterious World" (コンビニを出ると、 そこは不思議の世界でした, Konbini o Deru to, Soko wa Fushigi no Sekaideshita); 2. "Who Are You?" (オマエハダレダ, Omae wa Dareda); 3. "Hollow Shell" (残骸, Zangai); 4. "The Tower of the Living" (生者たちの塔, Seija-tachi no Tō); Interlude: "Meili Portroute" (メィリィ・ポートルート, Meirī Pōtorūto): 5. "Murder Is a Habit" (殺人は、癖になる, Satsujin wa, Kuse ni Naru); 6. "Re:Zero -Life Starts in Another World-" (Re:ゼロから始まる異世界生活, Ri:Zero kara Hajimaru Isekai Seikatsu)
| 24 | September 25, 2020 | 978-4-04-064945-0 | March 19, 2024 | 978-1-9753-3539-7 |
1. "Waiting for the Ice to Thaw" (雪解けを待つあなた, Yukidoke o Matsu Anata); 2. "In the Future" (これからの話, Korekara no Hanashi); 3. "— Stand Up" (— 立ちなさい, — Tachi Nasai); 4. "Five Obstacles" (五つの障害, Itsutsu no Shōgai); 5. "An Unreasonable Sword's Judgement" (理不尽な剣の鉄槌, Rifujin'na Ken no Tettsui); 6. "A Single-Minded Star" (一途な星, Ichizuna Hoshi)
| 25 | December 25, 2020 | 978-4-04-680080-0 | July 23, 2024 | 978-1-9753-7842-4 |
1. "■■■■■■ ■■■■■■■" (■■·■, ■■·■); 2. "Subaru Natsuki" (ナツキ・スバル); 3. "Louis Arneb" (ルイ・アルネブ, Rui Arunebu); 4. "Ready, Steady, Go" (Ready Steady Go); 5. "Mental Death" (精神の死, Seishin no Shi); 6. "Good Loser" (グッドルーザー, Guddo Rūzā); 7. "Ram" (ラム, Ramu); 8. "— I Ask Thy Will" (志を問わん, Kokorozashi o Towan); 9. "Shaula" (シャウラ, Shaura); 10. "Hero" (英雄, Eiyū)
Arc 7
| 26 | March 25, 2021 | 978-4-04-680330-6 | November 26, 2024 | 978-1-9753-7844-8 |
Prologue: "The People at the Watchtower" (監視塔の人々, Kanshi-tō no Hitobito): 1. "Baptism" (洗礼, Senrei); 2. "A Brave Choice" (勇気ある選択, Yūki aru Sentaku); 3. "It's Rough Being a Man" (男はつらかったよ, Otoko wa Tsurakatta yo); 4. "The Imperial Way" (帝国の流儀, Teikoku no Ryūgi); 5. "The Empire of Volakia" (ヴォラキア帝国, Vorakia Teikoku)
| 27 | June 25, 2021 | 978-4-04-680510-2 | June 3, 2025 | 978-1-9753-7846-2 |
1. "Something I Want to Protect" (守りたいモノ, Mamoritai Mono); 2. "Creeping Malignancy" (忍び寄る狂気, Shinobiyoru Kyōki); 3. "The Battle of Fortress City Guaral" (城郭都市グァラル攻防戦, Jōkaku Toshi Guararu Kōbō-sen); 4. "Emperor / Merchant / Subaru Natsuki " (皇帝 / 商人 / ナツキ・スバル, Kōtei / Shōnin / Natsuki Subaru); Interlude: "Zikr Osman" (ズィクル・オスマン, Zikuru Osuman): 5. "The Musician Natsumi Schwartz" (楽士ナツミ・シュバルツ, Gakushi Natsumi Shubarutsu); 6. "A Haughty Crimson" (傲岸不遜な紅, Gōgan Fuson'na Kurenai)
| 28 | December 24, 2021 | 978-4-04-680998-8 | December 16, 2025 | 978-1-9753-7848-6 |
1. "A Reunion Like a Boiling Pool of Blood" (再会は燃える血潮の如く, Saikai wa Moeru Chishio Nogotoku); Interlude: "Haves and Have-Nots" (持つものと持たざるモノ, Motsu-mono to Motazaru-mono): 2. "Self-Proclaimed Hero Subaru Natsuki " (自称英雄ナツキ・スバル, Jishō Eiyū Natsuki Subaru); 3. "The Path That Must Be Taken" (進むべき道筋, Susumubeki Michisuji); 4. "The Chaotic Demon City" (混沌たる魔都, Kontontaru Mazu); 5. "A Reward Eight Years in the Making" (八年越しの褒美, Hachi Toshikoshi no Hōbi)
| 29 | March 25, 2022 | 978-4-04-681286-5 | July 14, 2026 | 978-1-9753-7850-9 |
1. "A Beast of Ambition" (野心の獣, Yashin no Kemono); 2. "Behind Your Eyelids" (瞼の裏側, Mabuta no Uragawa); 3. "Soul Marriage" (コンコン, Konkon); 4. "A XXXXXXXX That Does Not Fade" (消えぬ■■, Kienu ■■); 5. "Stars Aligning" (星の巡り合わせ, Hoshinomeguri Awase); 6. "An Unyielding Love" (恋心は譲れない, Koigokoro wa Yuzurenai); 7. "Beyond the Eleventh Second" (十一秒のその先, Jūichi-byō no Sono-saki); 8. "Utopia Chaosflame" (理想郷カオスフレーム, Risōkyō Kaosufurēmu); Interlude: "Filling the Blue Sky" (蒼穹を覆う, Sōkyū o ōu)
| 30 | June 24, 2022 | 978-4-04-681476-0 | December 8, 2026 | 978-1-9753-7856-1 |
1. "The Cacophony of the Demon City" (魔都狂騒曲, Mazu Kyōsō Kyoku); 2. "I Can't Live Wiser" (賢くは生きられない, Kashikoku wa Iki Rarenai); 3. "Taritta Shudrak" (タリッタ・シュドラク, Taritta Shudoraku); 4. "The Cacophony of the Fortress City" (城郭都市狂騒曲, Jōkaku Toshi Kyōsō Kyoku); 5. "I Don't Mind Being Called a Moron" (大馬鹿と呼ばれて構わない, Dai Baka to Yoba Rete Kamawanai); 6. "Flop O'Connell" (フロップ・オコーネル, Furoppu O'Kōneru); Interlude: "The Frenzied Overture of the Empire" (帝国狂騒序曲, Teikoku Kyōsō Jokyoku)
| 31 | September 22, 2022 | 978-4-04-681748-8 | — | — |
1. "Sparka" (スパルカ, Suparuka); 2. "Magic Words" (魔法の言葉, Mahō no Kotoba); 3. "Hiain Yatz" (ヒアイン・ヤッツ, Hiain Yattsu); 4. "Arriving from the Imperial Capital" (帝都より来たる, Teito Yori Kitaru); 5. "Weitz Rogen" (ヴァイツ・ログン, Vuaitsu Rogun); 6. "Idra Missanga" (イドラ・ミサンガ, Idora Misanga); 7. "I Know" (I know)
| 32 | December 23, 2022 | 978-4-04-682041-9 | — | — |
Prologue: "Chance Meeting at the Imperial Capital" (帝都にて邂逅す, Teito nite Kaigō Su): 1. "Twist of Fate" (運命の悪戯, Unmei no Itazura); 2. "Iris and the King of Thorns" (アイリスと茨の王, Airisu to Ibara no Ō); Interlude: "The Fierce Lady and the Clown" (女傑と道化, Joketsu to Dōke): 3. "Fhrend" (ユージン, Yūjin); 4. "The Five Bastions" (五つの頂点, Itsutsu no Chōten); 5. "New Wind" (風穴, Kazaana); 6. "Kafma Irulux" (カフマ・イルルクス, Kafuma Irurukusu); 7. "Decisive Battle at the Bastion" (頂点決戦, Chōten Kessen); 8. "Enemies on All Bastions" (頂点楚歌, Chōten Soka); 9. "Painting with Deep Love" (深愛で描く, Shin'ai de Kaku)
| 33 | March 29, 2023 | 978-4-04-682331-1 | — | — |
1. "The Pleiades Battalion" (プレアデス戦団, Pureadesu Sen-dan); 2. "A Myriad of Changes at the Bastions" (壁点万化, Kabeten Banka); 3. "Bastions in Chaos" (壁点乱麻, Kabeten Ranma); 4. "Chisha Gold" (チシャ・ゴールド, Chisha Gōrudo); 5. "Sword Wolf of the Empire" (帝国の剣狼, Teikoku no Ken Ōkami); Interlude: "Congratulatory Words" (言祝ぎ, Kotohogi)
Arc 8
| 34 | June 23, 2023 | 978-4-04-682567-4 | — | — |
| 35 | September 25, 2023 | 978-4-04-682863-7 | — | — |
| 36 | December 25, 2023 | 978-4-04-683156-9 | — | — |
| 37 | March 25, 2024 | 978-4-04-683470-6 | — | — |
| 38 | June 25, 2024 | 978-4-04-683704-2 | — | — |
Arc 9
| 39 | September 25, 2024 | 978-4-04-684004-2 | — | — |
| 40 | March 24, 2025 | 978-4-04-684634-1 | — | — |
| 41 | June 25, 2025 | 978-4-04-684890-1 | — | — |
| 42 | September 25, 2025 | 978-4-04-685184-0 | — | — |
| 43 | December 25, 2025 | 978-4-04-685502-2 | — | — |
Arc 10
| 44 | March 25, 2026 | 978-4-04-685820-7 | — | — |
| 45 | June 25, 2026 | 978-4-04-660214-5 | — | — |
| 46 | September 25, 2026 | 978-4-04-660526-9 | — | — |
| 47 | December 25, 2026 | 978-4-04-660868-0 | — | — |

=== Ex ===
| No. | Title | Original release date | English release date |
|---|---|---|---|
| Ex | The Dream of the Lion King; Shishiō no Mita Yume (獅子王の見た夢) | June 25, 2015; 978-4-04-067685-2 | November 21, 2017; 978-0-316-41290-2 |
"A Dream's Beginning" (夢の始まり, Yume no Hajimari) "Felix Argyle Is a Pretty Boy" (フェリックス・アーガイルは男の娘である, Ferikkusu Āgairu wa Otokonoko Dearu) "The Valkyrie of Duke Karsten's Lands" (カルステン公爵領の戦乙女, Karusuten Koushaku-Ryō no Ikusa Otome) "Felix Argle's Curse" (フェリックス・アーガイルの呪縛, Ferikkusu Āgairu no Jubaku) "The Dream of the Lion King" (獅子王の見た夢, Shishiō no Mita Yume)
| Ex2 | The Love Song of the Sword Devil; Kenki Renka (剣鬼恋歌) | December 25, 2015; 978-4-04-068009-5 | March 27, 2018; 978-0-316-47909-7 |
"The Love Song of the Sword Devil: First Stanza" (剣鬼恋歌––一幕, Kenki Renka——Ichi-Maku) "The Love Song of the Sword Devil: Second Stanza" (剣鬼恋歌––二幕, Kenki Renka——Ni-Maku) "The Love Song of the Sword Devil: Third Stanza" (剣鬼恋歌––三幕, Kenki Renka——San-Maku) "The Love Song of the Sword Devil: Fourth Stanza" (剣鬼恋歌––四幕, Kenki Renka——Shi-Maku) "The Love Song of the Sword Devil: Fifth Stanza" (剣鬼恋歌––五幕, Kenki Renka——Go-Maku) "The Love Song of the Sword Devil: Sixth Stanza" (剣鬼恋歌––六幕, Kenki Renka——Roku-Maku) "The Love Song of the Sword Devil: Seventh Stanza" (剣鬼恋歌––七幕, Kenki Renka——Shichi-Maku) "The Love Song of the Sword Devil: Interlude" (剣鬼恋歌––幕間, Kenki Renka——Maku-Ai) "The Love Song of the Sword Devil: Final Stanza" (剣鬼恋歌––終幕, Kenki Renka——Shū-Maku)
| Ex3 | The Love Ballad of the Sword Devil; Kenki Rentan (剣鬼恋譚) | June 25, 2018; 978-4-04-069953-0 | April 23, 2019; 978-1-9753-0426-3 |
"The Love Ballad of the Sword Devil: What Became of Them" (剣鬼恋譚——その後の二人, Kenki Rentan——Sonogo no Futari) "The Love Ballad of the Sword Devil: The Wedding Day" (剣鬼恋譚——婚礼の日, Kenki Rentan——Konrei no Hi) "The Love Ballad of the Sword Devil: The Silver Flower Dance of Pictat" (剣鬼恋譚——ピックタットの銀華乱舞, Kenki Rentan——Pikkutatto no Ginka-Rambu) "The Love Ballad of the Sword Devil: Lovers' Interlude" (剣鬼恋譚——幕間の恋人たち, Kenki Rentan——Maku-Ai no Koibito Tachi)
| Ex4 | The Great Journeys; Saiyū Kikō (最優紀行) | December 25, 2019; 978-4-0406-4265-9 | September 22, 2020; 978-1-9753-1601-3 |
"Record of the Days Before the Royal Selection: Diplomacy by Bloodshed" (王選前日譚 流血の帝国外交, Ousen Zenjitsu-tan Ryūketsu no Teikoku Gaikou) "Record of the Days Before the Royal Selection: The Silver Flower Dance of the Sword Saint and the Lightning" (王選前日譚 剣聖と雷光の銀華乱舞, Ousen Zenjitsu-tan Kensei to Raikou no Ginka-Rambu)
| Ex5 | The Tale of the Scarlet Princess; Hiiro Himetan (緋色姫譚) | September 25, 2021; 978-4-04-680768-7 | November 8, 2022; 978-1-9753-4854-0 |
"Crimson Shadow" (紅蓮の残影, Guren no Zanei) "Vermilion Swordwolf" (赫炎の剣狼, Kakuen no Kenrou) "Scarlet Parting" (緋色の別離, Hiiro no Wakare)
| Ex6 | The Battle Hymn of the Sword Devil; Kenki Senka (剣鬼戦歌) | December 25, 2024; 978-4-04-684340-1 | March 10, 2026; 979-8-8554-2449-2 |
Prologue: "Prelude: Sparks of War" (序幕/戦火, Jo-Maku/Senka): 1. "Act I: First of Fruits" (一幕/先果, Hito-Maku/Senka); 2. "Act II: Harbinger of Disaster" (二幕/宣禍, Ni-Maku/Senka); 3. "Act III: Hiding of Flowers" (三幕/潜花, San-Maku/Senka); 4. "Act IV: Colors of Mist" (四幕/染霞, Shi-Maku/Senka); 5. "Act V: Thousands of Fires" (五幕/千火, Go-Maku/Senka); 6. "Act VI: Flash of Splendor" (六幕/閃華, Roku-Maku/Senka); 7. "Final Act: Hymn of Battle" (終章/戦歌, Shūshō/Ikusauta)

=== Short story collections ===
| No. | Original release date | Original ISBN | English release date | English ISBN |
|---|---|---|---|---|
| 1 | December 25, 2014 | 978-4-04-067197-0 | August 20, 2024 | 978-1-9753-9251-2 |
"A Heroic Epic Starting from Zero" (ゼロから始まる英雄譚, Zero Kara Hajimaru Eiyūtan) "The Head Maid's Restless Day of Rest" (メイド長の心休まらない休日, Meido-chō no Kokoro Yasumaranai Kyūjitsu) "The Day I Stopped Being the Aldebaran Star" (後追い星をやめた日, Atooi Hoshi o Yameta hi) "Emilia in Wonderland" (エミリア・イン・ワンダーランド, Emiria in Wandārando)
| 2 | June 24, 2016 | 978-4-04-068414-7 | January 7, 2025 | 978-1-9753-9253-6 |
"A Love Song for E M T" (E・M・Tにラブソングを, E M T ni Rabusongu o) "Ram's Order" (ラムイズオーダー, Ramuizuōdā) "Operation KOKKURI" (オペレーション KOKKURI, Operēshon KOKKURI) "Librarian Beatrice's Reluctant Promise" (司書ベアトリスの不本意な約束, Shisho Beatorisu no Fuhon'ina Yakusoku) "Some Like It Cold" (冷たいのがお好き, Tsumetai no ga o Suki) "Alcohol Panic" (アルコール・パニック, Arukōru Panikku)
| 3 | December 25, 2017 | 978-4-04-069609-6 | May 27, 2025 | 978-1-9753-9326-7 |
"My Fair Bad Lady" (マイ・フェア・バッドレディ, Mai Fea Baddoreddi) "The World Through Petra's Eyes" (――ペトラの見た世界, Petora no Mita Sekai) "Rem's Ultra-Ordinary and Cozy Day" (レムの極々平凡で幸せな一日, Remu no Gokugoku Heibon de Shiawase na Ichinichi) "Kararagi Girl Meets Cats" (カララギガール・ミーツ・キャッツ, Kararagi Gāru Mītsu Kyattsu) "Sunlight on the Water's Surface" (陽光、水面照らして――, Youkou, Suimen Terashite)
| 4 | March 27, 2019 | 978-4-04-065629-8 | February 10, 2026 | 978-1-9753-9328-1 |
"Felt, Starting the Royal Selection from Zero" (フェルトちゃん、ゼロから始める王選生活, Feruto-chan, zero kara hajimeru ō-sen seikatsu) "The Golden Lion and the Sword Saint, Starting the Royal Selection from Zero" (ゼロから始める王選生活 金獅子と剣聖, Zero kara hajimeru ō-sen seikatsu Kinjishi to Kensei) "Pride, Prejudice, and Zombies" (高慢と偏屈とゾンビ, Kouman to Henkutsu to Zonbi) "Otto's Bittersweet Merchant's Log" (オットーの悲喜交々行商録, Ottō no hiki komogomo gyōshō-roku)
| 5 | September 25, 2019 | 978-4-04-064126-3 | June 9, 2026 | 978-1-9753-9330-4 |
"Royal Selection Prequel: The Blue Successor" (王選前日譚 青の継承者, Ousen Zenjitsutan Ao no Keishousha) "Kararagi Girl & Cat's Eye" (カララギガール&キャッツアイ, Kararagi Gāru & Kyattsuai) "The Idiot Trio Goes Forth! Tale of the Dirt Spider" (三馬鹿が行く！ 土蜘蛛編, Sanbaka ga shuyaku! Tsuchigumo Hen)
| 6 | July 20, 2020 | 978-4-04-064585-8 | November 10, 2026 | 978-1-9753-9332-8 |
| 7 | June 24, 2022 | 978-4-04-681478-4 | — | — |
| 8 | December 23, 2022 | 978-4-04-682042-6 | — | — |
| 9 | September 25, 2023 | 978-4-04-682862-0 | — | — |
| 10 | March 25, 2024 | 978-4-04-683471-3 | — | — |
| 11 | October 25, 2024 | 978-4-04-684160-5 | — | — |
| 12 | April 25, 2025 | 978-4-04-684719-5 | — | — |
| 13 | October 24, 2025 | 978-4-04-685286-1 | — | — |
| 14 | July 24, 2026 | 978-4-04-660314-2 | — | — |

== Manga ==
=== Main arcs ===
==== A Day in the Capital ====
A manga adaptation by Daichi Matsue, titled Re:Zero −Starting Life in Another World- Chapter 1: A Day in the Capital (Re：ゼロから始める異世界生活 第一章 王都の一日編, Re: Zero Kara Hajimeru Isekai Seikatsu Dai-Ichi-Shō: Ōto no Ichinichi-hen), began serialization in the August 2014 issue of Media Factory's seinen manga magazine Monthly Comic Alive on June 27, 2014. The final volume was released on March 23, 2015.

On December 2, 2015, Yen Press announced that they had licensed the series.

| No. | Original release date | Original ISBN | English release date | English ISBN |
|---|---|---|---|---|
| 1 | October 23, 2014 | 978-4-04-066875-8 | July 26, 2016 | 978-0-316-31531-9 |
1. "And God Said, "Don't Get Ahead of Yourself"" (調子に乗るな、と神は言った, Chōshi ni Noru na, to Kami wa Itta); 2. "Returning the Lap Pillow's Favor" (膝枕の恩返し, Hizamakura no Ongaeshi); 3. "The End of the Beginning" (始まりの終わり, Hajimari no Owari); 4. "The Bitter Taste of Alcohol" (苦い酒の味, Nigai Sake no Aji); 5. "A Struggle Far Too Late" (遅すぎる抗い, Oso Sugiru Aragai)
| 2 | March 23, 2015 | 978-4-04-067280-9 | October 25, 2016 | 978-0-316-39854-1 |
6. "Ending and Beginning" (終わりと始まり, Owari to Hajimari); 7. "The "Master Swordsman"" (その男、剣聖につき, Sono Otoko, Kensei ni Tsuki); 8. "Negotiations in the Slums" (貧民街の交渉, Hinmingai no Kōshō); 9. "Battle in the Loot Cellar" (盗品蔵の攻防, Touhingura no Kōbō); 10. "The Power of the Master Swordsman" (剣聖の威力, Kensei no Iryoku); 11. "Starting Life in Another World" (ゼロから始める異世界生活, Zero kara Hajimeru Isekai Seikatsu)

==== A Week at the Mansion ====
A second manga, titled Re:Zero -Starting Life in Another World-, Chapter 2: A Week at the Mansion (Re：ゼロから始める異世界生活 第二章 屋敷の一週間編, Re: Zero Kara Hajimeru Isekai Seikatsu Dai-Ni-Shō: Yashiki no Ishūkan-hen), with art by Makoto Fugetsu, began serialization in Square Enix's seinen magazine Monthly Big Gangan on October 25, 2014.

The second adaptation has also been licensed by Yen Press.

| No. | Original release date | Original ISBN | English release date | English ISBN |
|---|---|---|---|---|
| 1 | March 23, 2015 | 978-4-7575-4591-5 | May 23, 2017 | 978-0-316-47188-6 |
1. "A So-called Summoning to Another World" (いわゆるひとつの異世界召喚もの, Iwayuru Hitotsu no Isekai Shoukan Mono); 2. "The Next Day" (続きの明日, Tsuzuki no Asu); 3. "A Debt That Cannot Be Repaid" (返せない恩義, Kaesenai Ongi); 4. "Starting Working Life from Zero" (ゼロから始める勤労生活, Zero kara Hajimeru Kinrou Seikatsu); 5. "The Promised Morn Grows Distant" (約束した朝は遠く, Yakusoku Shita Asa ha Tōku); "Subaru Natsuki's Elegant Domestic Lifestyle" (ナツキ・スバルの華麗なる家令生活, Natsuki Subaru no Kareinaru karei Seikatsu)
| 2 | December 22, 2015 | 978-4-7575-4747-6 | August 22, 2017 | 978-0-316-47238-8 |
5. "The Lost Four Days" (失われた四日間, Ushinawareta Yokkakan); 6. "The "Second" Week" (二度目の一週間, Nidome no Isshūkan); 7. "The Sound of Chains" (鎖の音, Kusari no Oto); 8. "A Deadly Game of Tag" (逢魔時の鬼ごっこ, Oomagatoki no Onigokko); 9. "Hands" (手, Te); "The Roswaal Manor Girls' Meet (Hot Bath Edition)" (ロズワール邸女子会 (お風呂場編), Rozuwāru tei Joshikai (Ofuro Ba-hen))
| 3 | June 22, 2016 | 978-4-7575-5025-4 | October 31, 2017 | 978-0-316-47316-3 |
10. "The Morning He Yearned For" (待ち望んだ朝, Machinozonda Asa); 11. "A Happy Nightmare" (幸せな悪夢, Shiawasena Akumu); 12. "Subaru Natsuki's Restart" (ナツキ・スバルのリスタート, Natsuki Subaru no Risutāto); 13. "I Cried and Screamed and Will Cry No More" (泣いて泣き喚いて泣き止んだから, Naite Nakiwameite Nakiyanda kara); 14. "Earlham Village, for the Third Time" (三度目のア—ラム村, Sandome no Āramu-Mura); 15. "The Meaning of Courage" (勇気の意味, Yūki no Imi); "The Roswaal Manor Girls' Meet (Changing Room Edition)" (ロズワール邸女子会 (衣裳部屋編), Rozuwāru tei Joshikai (Ishō Heya-hen))
| 4 | March 22, 2017 | 978-4-7575-5256-2 | December 19, 2017 | 978-0-316-41411-1 |
16. "Demon Beasts" (魔獣, Majuu); 17. "The Way of the Demonic ①" (鬼がかったやり方 1, Onigakatta Yarikata 1); 18. "The Way of the Demonic ②" (鬼がかったやり方 2, Onigakatta Yarikata 2); 19. "Rem" (レム, Remu); 20. "Speaking About the Future" (未来の話, Mirai no Hanashi); "The Roswaal Manor Girls' Meet (Hot Bath Edition)" (ロズワール邸女子会 (お風呂場編), Rozuwāru tei Joshikai (Ofuro Ba-hen)) "The First Mayonnaise Insurrection" (第一次マヨネーズ騒動, Daiichiji Mayonēzu Sōdō)
| 5 | December 21, 2017 | 978-4-7575-5567-9 | September 18, 2018 | 978-1-9753-0179-8 |
EX 01. "The World Through Petra's Eyes" (——ペトラの見た世界, Petora no Mita Sekai) EX 02. "Rem's Exceedingly Average, Happy Day" (レムの極々平凡で幸せな一日, Remu no Gokugoku Heibon de Shiawase na Ichinichi) EX 03. "My Fair, Bad Lady" (マイ・フェア・バッドレディ, Mai Fea Baddo Reddi) EX 04. "The False Court Magician (Part 1)" (偽りの宮廷魔導師 前編, Itsuwari no Kyūtei Madōshi Zenpen) EX 05. "The False Court Magician (Part 2)" (偽りの宮廷魔導師 後編, Itsuwari no Kyūtei Madōshi Kōhen)

==== Truth of Zero ====
Daichi Matsue serialized a third manga, Re:ZERO -Starting Life in Another World-, Chapter 3: Truth of Zero (Re:ゼロから始める異世界生活 第三章 Truth of Zero, Re: Zero Kara Hajimeru Isekai Seikatsu Dai-San-Shō: Truth of Zero) in Comic Alive from July 2015 issue released on May 27, 2015, to February 21, 2020. It was compiled in eleven volumes.

The third manga has also been licensed for publication by Yen Press.

| No. | Original release date | Original ISBN | English release date | English ISBN |
|---|---|---|---|---|
| 1 | December 22, 2015 | 978-4-04-067828-3 | October 31, 2017 | 978-0-316-55946-1 |
1. "A Gentle, Early Morning" (穏やかな早朝, Odayakana Sōchō); 2. "The Orange Girl" (橙色の少女, Daidaiiro no Shōjo); 3. "Shared Homeland" (同郷, Dōkyōu); 4. "The Royal Selection Begins" (王選の始まり, Ōsen no Hajimari); 5. "Statement of Conviction" (所信表明, Shoshin Hyōmei)
| 2 | March 23, 2016 | 978-4-04-068220-4 | January 30, 2018 | 978-0-316-55950-8 |
6. "The Silver-Haired Witch's Request" (銀色の魔女の願い, Giniro no Majo no Negai); 7. "Subaru Natsuki, the Self-Proclaimed Knight" (自称騎士ナツキ・スバル, Jishou Kishi Natsuki Subaru); 8. "The Self-Declared Knight and the Knight Proper" (自称騎士と騎士, Jishou Kishi to Kishi); 9. "Alone" (ひとり, Hitori); 10. "A Decaying Mind" (腐敗する精神, Fuhai suru Seishin)
| 3 | July 23, 2016 | 978-4-04-068279-2 | April 24, 2018 | 978-0-316-55952-2 |
11. "A Situation in Motion" (動き出す事態, Ugokidasu Jitai); 12. "The Illness Called Despair" (絶望という病, Zetsubō toiu Yamai); 13. "On the Verge of Madness" (狂気の外側, Kyouki no Sotogawa); 14. "Sloth" (怠惰, Taida)
| 4 | December 23, 2016 | 978-4-04-068815-2 | August 21, 2018 | 978-1-9753-0068-5 |
15. "The Return Toward the Truth" (現実への回帰, Genjitsu he ni Kaiki); 16. "Immature Negotiating" (幼い交渉, Osanai Kōshō); 17. "Encounter" (遭遇, Sōgū); 18. "At the Edge of Humiliation" (醜態の果てに, Shūtai no Hate ni)
| 5 | March 23, 2017 | 978-4-04-069166-4 | November 13, 2018 | 978-1-9753-0071-5 |
19. "Won't Let Me Say the Words" (言葉にはさせない, Kotoba ni ha Sasenai); 20. "The Beast of the End" (終焉の獣, Shūen no Kemono); 21. "Entreaty" (懇願, Kongan); 22. "From Zero" (ゼロから, Zero kara)
| 6 | August 23, 2017 | 978-4-04-069372-9 | March 26, 2019 | 978-1-9753-0373-0 |
23. "The Unplayed Card" (配られたカード, Kubarareta Kādo); 24. "Prelude" (前哨, Zenshō); 25. "The Decisive Battle Begins" (決戦の火蓋, Kessen no Hibuta); 26. "The Battle of the White Whale" (白鯨攻略戦, Hakugei Kōryaku-sen); 27. "Menace of the Mist" (霧の脅威, Kiri no Kyōi)
| 7 | January 23, 2018 | 978-4-04-069629-4 | May 21, 2019 | 978-1-9753-0401-0 |
28. "A Gamble to Defy Despair" (絶望に抗う賭け, Zetsubō ni Aragau Kake); 29. "The Truth Behind the Rampage" (暴かれる正体, Abakareru Shōtai); 30. "The Giant Beast Falls" (墜ちる巨獣, Ochiru Kyojū); 31. "Wilhelm van Astrea" (ヴィルヘルム・ヴァン・アストレア, Viruherumu van Asutorea); 32. "The Road to the Mathers Domain" (メイザース領への道, Meizāsu Ryō e no Michi)
| 8 | June 23, 2018 | 978-4-04-069913-4 | August 20, 2019 | 978-1-9753-0403-4 |
33. "Squaring Past & Present" (過去と未来の清算, Kako to Mirai no Seisan); 34. "A Beeline Toward Sloth" (怠惰一閃, Taida Issen); 35. "Complications in Hunting the Cult" (魔女教狩りの顛末, Majokyō Kari no Tenmatsu); 36. "Flight—" (戦え——, Tatakae); 37. "Spirit Knight" (精霊騎士, Seirei Kishi); "On the Eve of Battle, Thinking of You" (君想う決戦前夜, Kimi Omou Kessen Zen'ya)
| 9 | November 21, 2018 | 978-4-04-065248-1 | December 10, 2019 | 978-1-9753-5878-5 |
38. "A Crafty "Sloth"" (悪辣なる怠惰, Akuratsu Naru Taida); 39. "Fulfilling a Promise" (契約の履行, Keiyaku no Rikō); 40. "Reunion x Send-off x Turnabout" (再会 x 先送り x 逆転の目, Saikai x Sakiokuri x Gyakuten no Me); 41. "The Gospel Call "Warmth"" (温もりという福音, Nukumori Toiu Fukuin); 42. "The Madman and the Supporting Actor" (狂人と狂言回し, Kyōjin to Kyōgenmawashi)
| 10 | June 22, 2019 | 978-4-04-065709-7 | February 18, 2020 | 978-1-9753-0809-4 |
43. "The Self-Proclaimed Knight & the Finest of Knights" (自称騎士と最優の騎士, Jishō Kishi to Saiyū no Kishi); 44. "Synchronized Vision" (同調する視覚, Dōchō Suru Shikaku); 45. "The End of Sloth" (怠惰の終焉, Taida no Shūen); 46. "Pursuit" (追跡, Tsuiseki); 47. "The Gospel Called "Love"" (愛という福音, Ai to iu Fukuin); 48. "The Meaning of My Life Here" (ここに生きる意味, Koko ni Ikiru Imi); 49. "It Was That Simple a Story" (ただそれだけの物語, Tada Sore Dake no Monogatari)
| 11 | February 21, 2020 | 978-4-04-064380-9 | December 15, 2020 | 978-1-9753-1913-7 |
50. "A Little Time in a Dragon Carriage" (竜車での一幕, Ryūsha de no Hitomaku); 51. "Lost Chapter: Rem Natsuki" (断章 ナツキ・レム, Danshō Natsuki Remu); 52. "Let Us Feast" (イタダキマス, Itadakimasu); 53. "To Each, Their Vows..." (それぞれ、誓い, Sorezore, Chikai); "On the Eve of Battle, Thinking of You" (君想う決戦前夜, Kimi Omou Kessen Zen'ya)

==== The Sanctuary and the Witch of Greed ====
A fourth manga is being serialized with art from Haruna Atori.

The fourth manga has also been licensed for publication by Yen Press.

| No. | Original release date | Original ISBN | English release date | English ISBN |
|---|---|---|---|---|
| 1 | February 21, 2020 | 978-4-04-064376-2 | January 26, 2021 | 978-1-9753-2028-7 |
1. "The Place He Went Home To" (帰り着いた場所で, Kaeritsuita Basho de); 2. "Reunions and Missed Connections" (再会とすれ違い, Saikai to Surechigai); 3. "Inquisitiveness Evolved" (知識欲の権化, Chishikiyoku no Gonge); 4. "A Long-Awaited Reunion" (待ちかねた再会, Machikaneta Saikai)
| 2 | June 23, 2020 | 978-4-04-064743-2 | December 28, 2021 | 978-1-9753-2311-0 |
5. "Qualifications and the Trial" (資格と試練, Shikaku to Shiren); 6. "Morning in the Natsuki Household" (菜月家の朝, Natsuki-ke no Asa); 7. "A Long Good-Bye" (長いお別れ, Nagai Owakare); 8. "Test Results" (試験結果, Shikenkekka)
| 3 | December 23, 2020 | 978-4-04-680034-3 | March 8, 2022 | 978-1-9753-3993-7 |
9. "A Questionable Q&A" (質疑応答, Shitsugi Ōtō); 10. "A New Loop" (新たなループ, Aratana Rūpu); 11. "Trial Substitute" (試練の代行, Shiren no Daikō); 12. "A Card Played in Advance" (先んじた一手, Sakinjita Itte); 13. "Intention and Vow" (真意と誓約, Shini to Seiyaku)
| 4 | June 23, 2021 | 978-4-04-680471-6 | July 5, 2022 | 978-1-9753-4208-1 |
14. "The Return of Madness" (狂気の帰還, Kyōki no Kikan); 15. "A Doomed World" (結び目録, Musubi Mokuroku); 16. "The Girl's Gospel" (少女の福音, Shōjo no Fukuin); 17. "The Barrier's Conditions" (結界の条件, Kekkai no Jōken); 18. "Friend" (ユージン, Yūjin)
| 5 | December 23, 2021 | 978-4-04-680948-3 | February 21, 2023 | 978-1-9753-4940-0 |
19. "Collaborators" (協力者, Kyōryoku-sha); 19.5. "Harbored Doubts" (抱えた疑念, Kakaeta Ginen): 20. "Tiger" (虎, Tora); 21. "Taboo" (禁忌, Kinki); 22. "The Witch of Gluttony" (暴食の魔女, Bōshoku no Majo); 23. "Creator of Demon Beasts" (魔獣の創造主, Majū no Sōzōnushi)
| 6 | June 22, 2022 | 978-4-04-681434-0 | June 27, 2023 | 978-1-9753-6933-0 |
24. "Love Love Love Love Love Love You" (らぶらぶらぶらぶらぶらぶゆー, Rabu Rabu Rabu Rabu Rabu Rabu Yu); 25. "Minute Changes" (些細な変化, Sasaina Henka); 26. "The Girl in the Crystal" (クリスタルの少女, Kurisutaru no Shōjo); 27. "Apostle of Greed" (強欲の使徒, Gōyoku no Shito); 28. "I Know Hell, All Right" (地獄なら知っている, Jigoku nara Shitte iru); 29. "A Tale of the End of the End" (終わりの終わりのお話, Owari no Owari no Ohanashi)
| 7 | January 23, 2023 | 978-4-04-682062-4 | December 12, 2023 | 978-1-9753-7563-8 |
30. "The Tragedy at Roswaal Manor" (ロズワール邸の惨劇, Rozuwāru Tei no Sangeki); 30.5. "The Meaning of Living" (生きる意味, Ikiru Imi): 31. "Passion Amid the Snow" (雪中の熱情, Setchū no Netsujō); 32. "Crimson Snowscape" (赤い雪景色, Akai Yukigeshiki); 33. "Beyond Hell" (地獄のその先, Jigoku no Sono-saki); 34. "Ending List" (えんでぃんぐりすと, Endingu Risuto); 35. "Whence Weakness" (弱さの在処, Yowasa no Arika)
| 8 | August 22, 2023 | 978-4-04-682689-3 | September 17, 2024 | 979-8-8554-0187-5 |
36. "The Witch's Scheme and Proposal" (魔女の企みと提案, Majo no Takurami to Teian); 37. "That Person" (その人, Sono Hito); 38. "Not-Satella" (≠サテラ, ≠ Satera); 39. "End of the Dream" (夢の終わり, Yume no Owari); 40. "The Remaining Option" (残された選択肢, Nokosa Reta Sentakushi); 41. "My Hope" (私の欲望, Watashi no Yokubō)
| 9 | March 23, 2024 | 978-4-04-683388-4 | April 22, 2025 | 979-8-8554-1492-9 |
42. "Wicked Schemes" (悪巧み, Warudakumi); 42.5. "Shima" (シーマ, Shīma): 43. "Left Behind" (おいてけぼり, Oitekebori); 44. "The Peddler's Trap" (行商人の罠, Gyōshōnin no Wana); 45. "Otto Suwen" (オットー・スーウェン, Ottō Sūen); 46. "A Man with Good Timing" (タイミングのいいだけの男, Taimingu no ī Dake no Otoko); 47. "Reason to Believe" (信じる理由, Shinjiru Riyū)
| 10 | October 22, 2024 | 978-4-04-684285-5 | March 24, 2026 | 979-8-8554-2685-4 |
48. "Garfiel's Barrier" (ガーフィールの結界, Gāfīru no Kekkai); 48.5. "None Can Lift the Quain Stone Alone" (クウェインの石は一人じゃ上がらない, Kuein no Ishi wa Hitori ja Agaranai): 49. "Grandmother, Mother, Sister—Grandson, Son, Brother" (祖母と、母と、姉と、孫で、息子で、弟で, Sobo to, Haha to, Ane to, Mago de, Musuko de, Otōto de); 50. "Love Letter" (らぶれたー, Rabu Reta); 51. "Smiling Days in Hearth and Home ①" (平家星の笑った日①, Heikeboshi no Waratta hi ①); 52. "Smiling Days in Hearth and Home ②" (平家星の笑った日②, Heikeboshi no Waratta hi ②); 53. "The Beginning, and Ruin, of the Sanctuary" (聖域の始まりと、崩壊の始まり, Seiiki no Hajimari to, Hōkai no Hajimari)
| 11 | April 23, 2025 | 978-4-04-684845-1 | August 25, 2026 | 979-8-8554-3456-9 |
54. "Giving Meaning to My Life" (私の生きた意味, Watashi no Ikita imi); 55. "The Devil of Melancholy" (憂鬱の魔人, Yūutsu no Majin); 56. "Good-Bye, Betty" (さようならベティー, Sayōnara Betī); 57. "Regulus Corneas" (レグルス・コル二アス, Regurusu Koruniasu); 58. "Love Worth Coughing Up Blood For" (愛のため血を吐く, Ai no Tame Chiwohaku); 59. "Past or Present, an Unchanging Love" (今も、過去も、変わらぬ愛, Ima mo, Kako mo, Kawaranu ai)
| 12 | October 23, 2025 | 978-4-04-685268-7 | — | — |
60. Eriōru dai Shinrin no Towa Tōdo 1 (エリオール大森林の永久凍土 1); 60.5. Eriōru Dai Shinrin no Towa Tōdo 2 (エリオール大森林の永久凍土 2): 61. Eriōru Dai Shinrin no Towa Tōdo 3 (エリオール大森林の永久凍土 3); 62. Eriōru Dai Shinrin no Towa Tōdo 4 (エリオール大森林の永久凍土 4); 63. Eriōru Dai Shinrin no Towa Tōdo 5 (エリオール大森林の永久凍土 5); 64. Watashi no Yonhyaku nen (私の四百年)
| 13 | April 23, 2026 | 978-4-04-660014-1 | — | — |
65. Shukuji (祝辞); 66. Fukushū Kara no Hajimari (復讐からの始まり); 67. Hōkō no Saikai 1 (咆哮の再開 1); 68. Hōkō no Saikai 2 (咆哮の再開 2); 69. Dohade na Uijin (ド派手な初陣)
| 14 | October 22, 2026 | 978-4-04-660686-0 | — | — |
70. Kūhaku no Sei (空白の生); 71. Majū Hōimō (魔獣包囲綱); 72. Kimi no Risō no Ima (君の理想の今); 73. Anata no Sono Yūki (あなたのその勇気); 74. Gendai Chishiki Musō (現代知識無双)

==== The City of Water and the Ode on Heroes ====
A fifth manga is being serialized with art from Wakaya Takase.

The fifth manga has also been licensed for publication by Yen Press.

| No. | Original release date | Original ISBN | English release date | English ISBN |
|---|---|---|---|---|
| 1 | September 28, 2024 | 978-4-04-811337-3 | September 29, 2026 | 979-8-8554-3135-3 |
1. "To the Water Gate City of Pristella" (水門都市プリステラへ, Suimon Toshi Purisutera e); 2. "The Water Raiment Inn" (水の羽衣亭, Mizu no Hagoromo-tei); 3. "An Odd Man" (妙な男, Myōna Otoko); 4. "Veranda" (緣側, Engawa); 5. "Discord" (確執, Kakushitsu); 6. "Wrath" (憤怒, Fundo)
| 2 | March 28, 2025 | 978-4-04-811429-5 | February 23, 2027 | 979-8-8554-4824-5 |
7. Ai (愛); 8. Kyōfu (恐怖); 9. Tsuyokya-ra (強キャラ); 10. Okan (惡寒); 11. Honshō (本性); 12. Kōen no Ketsumatsu Sono 1 (氷炎の結末 その 1)
| 3 | March 27, 2026 | 978-4-04-811714-2 | — | — |
13. Kōen no Ketsumatsu Sono 2 (氷炎の結末 その 2); 14. Kōen no Ketsumatsu Sono 3 (氷炎の結末 その 3); 15. Majo-kyō Taisaku Honbu Sono 1 (魔女教対策本部 その 1); 16. Majo-kyō Taisaku Honbu Sono 2 (魔女教対策本部 その 2); 17. Gōjasu Taigā Sono 1 (ゴージャス・タイガー その 1); 18. Gōjasu Taigā Sono 2 (ゴージャス・タイガー その 2)

=== Side stories ===
==== Anthology ====
Media Factory began publishing a manga anthology, titled Re:Zero − Starting Life in Another World − Official Anthology Comic (Re:ゼロから始める異世界生活 公式アンソロジーコミック, Re:Zero kara Hajimeru Isekai Seikatsu Kōshiki Ansorojī Komikku), in three volumes from June 2016 to March 2018.

| No. | Japanese release date | Japanese ISBN |
|---|---|---|
| 1 | June 23, 2016 | 978-4-04-068506-9 |
| 2 | September 23, 2017 | 978-4-04-069438-2 |
| 3 | March 23, 2018 | 978-40-4069751-2 |

==== Shinmeitan ====
A manga adaption of the second spinoff light novel The Love Song of the Sword Devil, illustrated by Tsubata Nozaki, was released from 2019 to 2021.

| No. | Japanese release date | Japanese ISBN |
|---|---|---|
| 1 | June 22, 2019 | 978-4-04-065762-2 |
| 2 | February 21, 2020 | 978-4-04-064364-9 |
| 3 | September 23, 2020 | 978-4-04-064834-7 |
| 4 | July 21, 2021 | 978-4-04-680467-9 |

==== The Frozen Bond ====
A manga adaptation of the novel Re:Zero Prequel: The Frozen Bond (Re：ゼロから始める前日譚 氷結の絆), released with the Season 1 Blu-rays, was illustrated by Minori Tsukahara and released from 2020 to 2021. It was licensed by Yen Press.

| No. | Original release date | Original ISBN | English release date | English ISBN |
|---|---|---|---|---|
| 1 | September 25, 2020 | 978-4-7575-6854-9 | May 31, 2022 | 978-1-9753-4255-5 |
1. "Beginning Everyday"; 2. "Omens of Woe"; 3. "The Witch of Jealousy"; 4. "Unfading Memory"
| 2 | February 5, 2021 | 978-4-7575-7077-1 | September 27, 2022 | 978-1-9753-4387-3 |
5. "Plea"; 6. "Separation and Punishment"; 7. "Payback"; 8. "Envoy of the Conciliation"; 9. "Skirmishes and Schemes"
| 3 | August 6, 2021 | 978-4-7575-7405-2 | March 21, 2023 | 978-1-9753-4555-6 |
10. "Bottomless Malice"; 11. "Where the Sin Belongs"; 12. "Fate"; 13. "Fire of Days Long Gone"; 14. "Assured Bonds"; 15. "The Meaning of Happiness"
