= Kiss and White Lily for My Dearest Girl =

Japanese manga series

- Cover of the first Japanese volume

あの娘にキスと白百合を (Ano Ko ni Kisu to Shirayuri o)
- Genre: Romance, yuri
- Manga
- Written by: Canno
- Published by: Media Factory
- English publisher: NA: Yen Press
- Magazine: Comic Alive
- Original run: November 27, 2013 – February 27, 2019
- Volumes: 10

Kiss and White Lily for My Dearest Girl (Japanese: あの娘にキスと白百合を, Hepburn: Ano Ko ni Kisu to Shirayuri o; lit., "A Kiss and White Lily for Her"), is a Japanese manga written and illustrated by Canno which was first serialized in Media Factory's seinen manga magazine Monthly Comic Alive on November 27, 2013, and has been compiled into ten tankōbon volumes.

== Synopsis ==
In middle school, Ayaka Shiramine was the perfect student: hard-working, with excellent grades and a great personality to match. As Ayaka enters high school she expects to still be on top, but one thing she didn't account for is her new classmate, the lazy yet genuine genius Yurine Kurosawa. While Ayaka despises Yurine from the start, Yurine doesn't seem to share her animosity. Slowly their relationship evolves into something more than just academic rivals.

== Media ==
=== Manga ===
Kiss and White Lily for My Dearest Girl has been serialized by Media Factory's seinen manga magazine Monthly Comic Alive since November 27, 2013. The series has been compiled into ten tankōbon volumes. The manga is licensed in North America by Yen Press.

=== Drama CD ===
A drama CD adaptation was released by Edge Records on 25 September 2015.

== Reception ==
Anime News Network gave the first volume a mixed review; noting, "Yuri doesn't have to always be sweeter than sugar, but it does still need characters you can get behind and want to see happy together – and that's not quite happening yet for our main couple." However, its review was generally more positive for volumes 2 and 3, stating that "this is a romance series that succeeds in showing how varied love can be depending on the couple."
