= Steins;Gate (manga) =

Japanese manga series

- First tankōbon volume cover, featuring Kurisu Makise

シュタインズ・ゲート (Shutainzu Gēto)
- Genre: Mystery; Science fiction; Thriller
- Manga
- Written by: Yomi Sarachi
- Published by: Media Factory
- English publisher: Udon Entertainment
- Magazine: Monthly Comic Alive
- Original run: September 26, 2009 – July 27, 2013
- Volumes: 3

Steins;Gate (Japanese: シュタインズゲート, Hepburn: Shutainzu Gēto) is a Japanese manga series created by Yomi Sarachi. It is based on 5pb. and Nitroplus' video game of the same name, and is part of the Science Adventure franchise. It was serialized by Media Factory in Monthly Comic Alive from September 2009 to July 2013, and was later released as three collected volumes; these were published by Udon Entertainment in North America in 2015 and 2016, and re-release in 2022 as one volume as:"Steins;Gate: The Complete Manga". The story follows Rintaro Okabe, who together with his friends use a microwave oven and a cell phone to send text messages back in time, altering the present.

The series performed well commercially and became one of Udon Entertainment's best selling manga. The series was well received by critics, calling it a complement to the original work.

== Synopsis ==
Steins;Gate is set in 2010 in Akihabara, Tokyo, and follows Rintaro Okabe, a self-proclaimed "mad scientist", who along with his friends discovers time travel through the use of a microwave oven and cell phone, allowing them to send text messages back in time to change the present. The text messages end up drawing the attention of SERN, an organization researching time travel, and have unforeseen changes that Okabe needs to try to undo.

== Production and release ==
Steins;Gate was written and drawn by Yomi Sarachi, and was serialized by Media Factory in their magazine Monthly Comic Alive, from its November 2009 issue on September 26, 2009, until its September 2013 issue on July 27, 2013. It is based on 5pb. and Nitroplus's video game of the same name, and is the main manga adaptation of it, adapting the main route through its story.

The manga was later collected as three tankōbon volumes, and released by Media Factory from June 2010 to September 2013. The first Japanese volume was also released in a limited edition that included a Steins;Gate audio drama written by Naotaka Hayashi, the scenario writer for the Steins;Gate game. The North American publisher Udon Entertainment announced during San Diego Comic-Con in July 2015 that they had licensed the manga, and planned to release the first volume in August of the same year. It eventually began publication in North America in November 2015, and ran until late April 2016; the last volume was made available earlier in the month in comic book stores. The Argentine publisher Editorial Ivrea published the three volumes in Spanish on a monthly schedule, from February to April 2015.

An omnibus edition collecting all volumes is planned to be released by Udon Entertainment with a revised English translation, as a hardcover book on October 21, 2021, and as a softcover in early 2022. The hardcover edition has an alternative cover art, and includes a fold-out poster depicting Kurisu.

=== Volumes ===
No.	Original release date	Original ISBN	English release date	English ISBN
1	June 23, 2010	978-4-84-013328-9	November 12, 2015	978-1-92-792550-8
2	September 21, 2013	978-4-84-015320-1	November 17, 2015	978-1-92-792555-3
3	September 21, 2013	978-4-84-015321-8	April 27, 2016	978-1-92-792571-3

== Reception ==
=== Reviews ===
Critics were positive in their opinions on the series. American publications ICv2 and Otaku USA both liked the manga, with the former calling it a solid story for fans of the genre, and the latter saying that it had fun characters and demonstrated why the franchise is popular. Both ICv2 and the Spanish publication Ramen Para Dos found it inferior to the original Steins;Gate game, however, mostly working as a complement to the game or its anime adaptation. Critics enjoyed the time travel and science fiction elements and how the story makes the subjects accessible to the average person without overwhelming them with jargon, furthermore, Ramen Para Dos enjoyed the sensation of time travel as well as they had hoped. The pacing was praised by ICv2 and Otaku USA, and they both enjoyed the ending to volume 1, calling it an exciting cliffhanger. The artwork was described by Ramen Para Dos as competently drawn, but looking very standard and not standing out, while ICv2 described it for trying to add comedy through cuteness despite the darker tone of the story.

=== Sales ===
The North American edition of Steins;Gate performed well commercially, and became one of Udon Entertainment's best selling manga series; the first volume sold past the publisher's expectations, and was issued a reprint in February 2016 after selling out completely. Volume 2 was estimated to be the 206th best selling graphic novel in American comic book stores of December 2015, and volume 3 the 260th best selling of April 2016.
