= The Other Side of Secret =

Japanese manga series

- The cover of the first volume.

シークレットの向こう側 (Shīkuretto no Mukōgawa)
- Genre: Fantasy, Action
- Manga
- Written by: Hideaki Yoshikawa
- Published by: Media Factory
- English publisher: NA: Seven Seas Entertainment
- Magazine: Monthly Comic Alive
- Original run: 27 September 2014 – 27 October 2015
- Volumes: 4

The Other Side of Secret (Japanese: シークレットの向こう側, Hepburn: Shīkuretto no Mukōgawa) is a Japanese manga series written and illustrated by Hideaki Yoshikawa. The series is published by Media Factory in Japan and by Seven Seas Entertainment in the United States.

== Release ==
Hideaki Yoshikawa began serializing the manga in the November issue of Media Factory's seinen manga magazine Monthly Comic Alive on 27 September 2014. The series concluded in the magazine's December 2015 issue on 27 October 2015, and has been collected into four volumes.

North American publisher Seven Seas Entertainment announced its license to the series on 14 July 2015.

=== Volumes ===
No.	Original release date	Original ISBN	English release date	English ISBN
1	22 November 2014	978-4-04-066897-0	9 June 2016	978-1-626923-1-64
1. "Overture"; 2. "Tragedy"; 3. "Determine"
2	23 March 2015	978-4-04-067287-8	13 September 2016	978-1-626923-30-0
4. "The other side" 5. "Intruders"; 6. "YU-TO"; 7. "Return"
3	23 July 2015	978-4-04-067571-8	6 December 2016	978-1-626923-70-6
8. "Who are you?" 9. "Wound & Relief"; 10. "YO-TO 2 ~Where did he come from...?~" 11. "KA-YO ~Who is the person?~
4	21 November 2015	978-4-04-067841-2	28 March 2017	978-1-626924-41-3
12. "Go to the bottom" 13. "Memory"; 14. "Truth"; 15. "And They're going on"; Ex. "Epilogue"

== Reception ==
Rebecca Silverman of Anime News Network gave the first volume a grade of B−. She felt that the story was interesting, but that the volume suffered from being mostly setup. She also felt that the series' fanservice was out of place, writing that it seemed "as if Yoshikawa felt the need to stop and give us a show before moving the plot along." She was positive toward the sibling relationships portrayed in the story, enjoying the fact that they were platonic as opposed to "distracting us with a forbidden love angle." She called the manga's art "serviceable without being particularly good", noting the lack of visible motion during action scenes, and commented that the series monsters were better drawn than its people.
