= Dungeon Friends Forever =

Japanese manga series

- Dungeon Childhood Friends
- First tankōbon volume cover

ダンジョンの幼なじみ (Danjon no Osananajimi)
- Genre: Fantasy; Romantic comedy
- Manga
- Written by: Yasuhisa Kuma
- Published by: Media Factory
- English publisher: NA: Seven Seas Entertainment
- Imprint: MF Comics Alive Series
- Magazine: Monthly Comic Alive
- Original run: January 27, 2022 – October 11, 2026
- Volumes: 8

Dungeon's Childhood Friends (ダンジョンの幼なじみ, Danjon no Osananajimi) is a Japanese manga series written and illustrated by Yasuhisa Kuma. It was originally published as a webcomic on the Nico Nico Seiga website in September 2021. It was later serialized in Media Factory's seinen manga magazine Monthly Comic Alive from January 2022 to October 2026.

== Plot ==
Van is a young man who regularly fights his way through the Wyrm Hole dungeon to meet up with its boss, a dragon named Ryuka who is actually his childhood friend. Ryuka can transform into a more humanoid form, in which she and Van hang out for his monthly visits. Although most of the subordinate monsters of the dungeon see Van as just an uncommonly skilled warrior, Ryuka's four highest-ranking lieutenants—a harpy, a minotaur, an orc and a wolfman—are aware of Van and Ryuka's long friendship and are eager to help it become something more romantic.

== Characters ==
Ryuka Obsidian (リューカ・オブシディアン, Ryūka Obushidian)
Voiced by: Ayane Sakura (voice comic)
Ryuka was saved by Van as a child and became fast friends with him. She does truly wish to win his heart, but Van is a bit too dense to understand her tsundere tendencies.
Van Sirius (ヴァン, Ban Shiriusu)
Voiced by: Yoshitsugu Matsuoka (voice comic)
Ryuka's childhood friend. He is the strongest class of adventurer due to getting "regular exercise" attacking Ryuka's subordinates on a monthly basis. He moved to the nearest village to get closer to Ryuka.
Harpy-san (ハッピーさん, Happī-san)
Voiced by: Larissa Tago Takeda (voice comic)
A harpy and one of the dungeon's four administrators. She's constantly trying to get Van and Ryuka's relationship to progress to something sexual. For a while, she had herself confused with a siren and insisted she had a beautiful singing voice.
Mino-san (ミノっさん)
Voiced by: Yuto Ishida (voice comic)
A minotaur and one of the dungeon's four administrators. Despite his manliness, he's obsessed with pure relationships and becomes violently angry whenever the subject of cheating or promiscuity comes up.
Orc-kun (オッくん, Okkun)
Voiced by: Hideyoshi Nozawa (voice comic)
An orc and one of the dungeon's four administrators. Even though he looks dumb, he's actually a genius tinkerer who often comes up with inventions that are either incredibly useful or completely useless. Sometimes they blow up, though.
Uru-kun (ウルくん)
Voiced by: Shun Kamimoto (voice comic)
A kobold and one of the dungeon's four administrators. He's responsible for personnel placement, and despite looking wimpy, he can transform into a werewolf-like creature when he's in trouble.

== Media ==
=== Manga ===
Written and illustrated by Yasuhisa Kuma, Dungeon Friends Forever was initially published as a webcomic on the Nico Nico Seiga website on September 3, 2021. It was later acquired by Media Factory who began serializing it in its seinen manga magazine Monthly Comic Alive on January 27, 2022. It ended serialization on October 11, 2026. Its chapters were compiled into eight tankōbon volumes released from June 22, 2022 to November 20, 2026. The series is licensed in English by Seven Seas Entertainment.

No.	Original release date	Original ISBN	North American release date	North American ISBN
1	June 22, 2022	978-4-04-681436-4	October 17, 2023	979-8-88843-024-8
1. "Childhood Friends in a Dungeon"; 2. "Childhood Friends from an Early Age"; 3. "Childhood Friends Stay Wholesome"; 4. "Childhood Friends Get Worried"; 5. "Childhood Friends Don't Get Charmed?"; 6. "Childhood Friends Go Exploring"; 7. "Childhood Friends Are as Close as Can Be"; 8. "Childhood Friends Are Safe with Us"; 9. "Childhood Friends Get Mad"
2	January 23, 2023	978-4-04-682063-1	March 5, 2024	979-8-88843-351-5
10. "There Can Never Be Enough Childhood Friends"; 11. "Minotaurs Make Great Bosses"; 12. "The Four Idiots in a Tight Spot"; 13. "A Terrifying Maid"; 14. "Happie Goes Fishing"; 15. "Childhood Friends Become New Monsters"; 16. "Childhood Friends Get Split in Half"; 17. "Childhood Friends Have Strong Mothers"; 18. "Childhood Friends Attract Stans"; Bonus: "Childhood Friends, Year Two"; Recording Session Report
3	August 22, 2023	978-4-04-682690-9	October 1, 2024	979-8-89160-177-2
19. "Happie Dies"; 20. "Childhood Friends Show Them Up"; 21. "Childhood Friends Are in Love?!"; 22. "Happy Childhood Friends Make Up Happy"; 23. "Childhood Friends Work Well Together"; 24. "Orc Tries Training Childhood Friends"; 25. "Exiling Childhood Friends Is a No-Go"; 26. "Another Day of Childhood Friends"; 27. "Childhood Friends Show Up Suddenly"; Bonus: "Childhood Friends Meet a Fluffy Pal"
4	March 23, 2024	978-4-04-683391-4	March 25, 2025	979-8-89373-133-0
28. "My Childhood Friend, the Great Hero"; 29. "Childhood Friends Show Pity"; 30. "Childhood Friends in a Dungeon, Again"; 31. "Do Childhood Friends Count as a Kink?"; 32. "Childhood Friends are Utter Monsters"; 33. "Childhood Friends Relive Old Memories"; 34. "Heroes Are Benevolent"; 35. "Childhood Friends Slip Undetected"; Bonus: "Popularity Poll Results"
5	October 22, 2024	978-4-04-683929-9	September 9, 2025	979-8-89373-938-1
36. "Childhood Friends Get Caught"; 37. "The Four Idiots Show Their Strength"; 38. "Childhood Friends Are Obvious at a Glance"; 39. "Dragons Tend to Be Introverts"; 40. "Childhood Friends Are Meat Eaters"; 41. "Childhood Friends Are Fiery and Pure of Heart"; 42. "There Should Always Be One Reliable Childhood Friend"; 43. "Kobolds Prefer One-Pieces"; 44. "High Hopes for Childhood Friends"; Bonus
6	March 22, 2025	978-4-04-684481-1	March 10, 2026	979-8-89765-115-3
45. "Childhood Friends Live It Up"; 46. "Childhood Friends Go Beast Mode"; 47. "Childhood Friends Drop a Bombshell"; 48. "Childhood Friends Finally Admit It"; 49. "Childhood Friends Are Scum"; 50. "Childhood Friends Better Not Have Relationship Woes"; 51. "Childhood Friends Become Ultimate Goblins"; Side Story: "Childhood Friends Shouldn't Be Discussed"; Bonus
7	November 21, 2025	978-4-04-685319-6	October 27, 2026	979-8-89863-177-2
52. "A Human and Dragon Lord Are Childhood Friends"; 53. "Childhood Friends Never Change"; 54. "Childhood Friends Proudly Brag"; 55. "Childhood Friends Never Lose (in Battle)"; 56. "Looking Up to Childhood Friends"; 57. "Bringing Childhood Friends to Tears"; 58. "Childhood Friends Are Sensitive to Flags"; 59. "I'll Protect Childhood Friends"; 60. "Childhood Friends Are Our Last Hope"; Side Story: "Before the Press Conference..."; Bonus
8	November 20, 2026	978-4-04-660695-2	—	—

=== Other ===
In commemoration of the release of the first volume, a voice comic adaptation was uploaded to the Kadokawa YouTube channel on the same day. The voice comic featured the voices of Ayane Sakura and Yoshitsugu Matsuoka.

== Reception ==
The series was nominated for the eighth Next Manga Awards in 2022 in the web category. The series was also nominated for the tenth edition in 2024 in the print category.
