= Monthly Comic Alive =

Comics manga magazine in Japan

- Cover of the first issue of Monthly Comic Alive featuring Louise from The Familiar of Zero. Illustration by Eiji Usatsuka.
- Categories: Seinen manga
- Frequency: Monthly
- Publisher: Media Factory
- First issue: June 27, 2006
- Country: Japan
- Language: Japanese
- Website: Monthly Comic Alive

Monthly Comic Alive (月刊コミックアライブ, Gekkan Komikku Araibu) is a Japanese seinen manga magazine published by Media Factory. The first issue was released on June 27, 2006.

== Serialized titles ==
- Absolute Duo
- Alice or Alice (until 2015, part of the supplement magazine Comic Cune)
- Ano Ko ni Kiss to Shirayuri wo
- Asobi ni Ikuyo!
- Boku wa Tomodachi ga Sukunai
- Bone Crusher
- Chaos;Head -Blue Complex-
- Classroom Crisis
- Classroom of the Elite
- Combatants Will Be Dispatched!
- D-Frag! (ongoing)
- Dungeon Friends Forever (ongoing)
- Gakuen 86
- Gods' Games We Play
- Hai-Furi
- Hanna of the Z
- Happiness!
- Happy Days Academy
- Hentai Ouji to Warawanai Neko.
- Hinako Note (until 2015, part of the supplement magazine Comic Cune)
- Honey Cosmos
- Hortensia Saga
- Iris Zero (ongoing)
- Infinite Stratos
- Jishou F-Rank no Oniisama ga Game de Hyouka sareru Gakuen no Chouten ni Kunrin suru Sou desu yo? (ongoing)
- Kage Kara Mamoru!
- Kaiju Girl Caramelise (ongoing)
- Kamiburo
- Kandachime
- Kanokon
- Kantai Collection
- Kämpfer
- Kono Naka ni Hitori, Imōto ga Iru!
- Kono Subarashii Sekai ni Bakuen wo!
- Kunon the Sorcerer Can See (ongoing)
- Kūsen Madōshi Kōhosei no Kyōkan
- Liar Liar (ongoing)
- Magician's Academy
- Maria Holic
- Magika no Kenshi to Shoukan Maou
- Mayo Chiki
- MM!
- Ms. Vampire Who Lives in My Neighborhood (until 2015, part of the supplement magazine Comic Cune)
- No Game No Life
- Non Non Biyori
- Oniichan dakedo Ai sae Areba Kankeinai yo ne!
- Osamake
- The Other Side of Secret
- -OZ-
- Ramen Tenshi Pretty Menma
- Re:BIRTH -The Lunatic Taker-
- Re:Zero kara Hajimeru Isekai Seikatsu: Daiisshō - Ōto no Ichinichi-hen
- Re:Zero kara Hajimeru Isekai Seikatsu: Daisanshō - Truth of Zero
- Re:Zero kara Hajimeru Isekai Seikatsu: Daiyonshō - The Sanctuary and the Witch of Greed
- Seiken no Blacksmith
- Senran Kagura (ongoing)
- Spirits & Cat Ears (until 2017, moved to Comic Cune)
- Steins;Gate
- Taboo Tattoo
- Tantei wa Mō, Shindeiru
- Tai-Madō Gakuen 35 Shiken Shōtai
- Tears to Tiara: Kakan no Daichi
- The Severing Crime Edge
- There's a Demon Lord on the Floor
- Tsuki Tsuki!
- Unbreakable Machine Doll
- Union!
- Whispered Words
- Why Does Nobody Remember Me in This World?
- Yumekuri
- Yururizumi
- Zero no Tsukaima

== See also ==
- List of manga magazines
