= Blue Drop (disambiguation) =

Blue Drop

- Blue Drop, a Japanese manga
- Blue Drops, a Japanese pop duo consisting of Hitomi Yoshida and Saori Hayami, organized for Japanese anime series Heaven's Lost Property
