= Ballet Pixelle =

General information
- Name: Ballet Pixelle
- Previous names: Second Life Ballet
- Year founded: 2006
- Founder: Inarra Saarinen
- Principal venue: Ballet Pixelle Theatre; Second Life, Quat
- Website: www.balletpixelle.org

Artistic staff
- Artistic Director: Inarra Saarinen

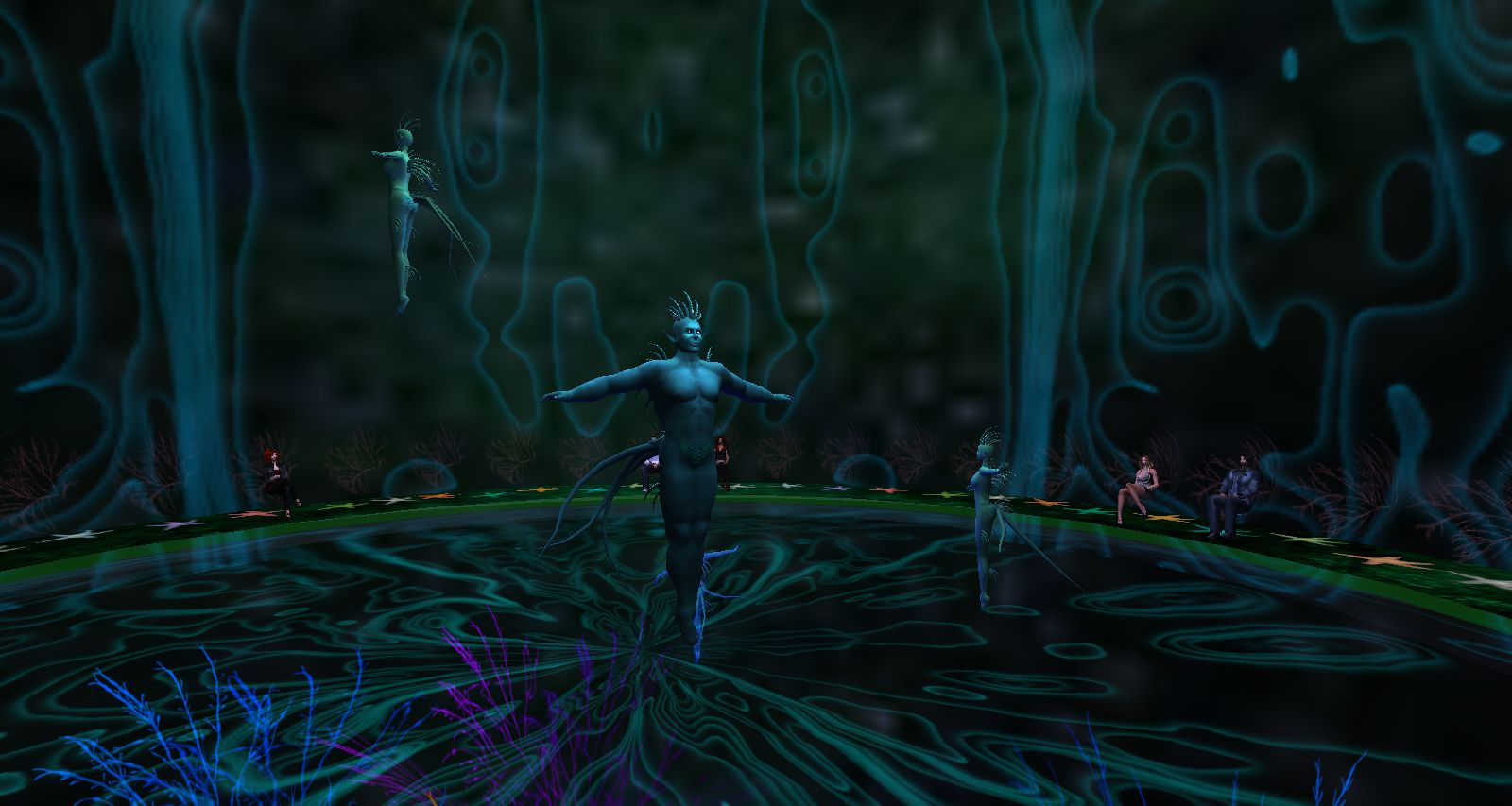
Chimera (2015)

Ballet Pixelle (previously known as Second Life Ballet) is a ballet company founded in 2006 by choreographer Inarra Saarinen. Saarinen still serves as artistic director and choreographer. Ballet Pixelle is the first dance company to perform completely in virtual reality. Its goal is to explore and extend physical and virtual dance and movement and to blend those realities.

The company presents neoclassical, contemporary ballet, and eclectic works with all original animations, choreography, and musical scores. The works are presented in real time with virtual dancers from all over the world. The dancers (from such places as Canada, Estonia, Germany, Japan, Portugal, Spain, United Kingdom and the USA) log in at the same time and, using avatars, perform choreography rehearsed previously. They are not automated, but actually dance in real time with the other dancers and the music. Mixed media arts are also used including historical video footage, photographs, machinima, paintings, and text. Anyone can watch the performances simply by accessing the Internet and logging into the global virtual reality called Second Life. There are no ticket fees.

== History ==
Ballet Pixelle was founded in 2006 by Inarra Saarinen.

The original goal was to move the art of dance into a virtual environment, a mission which still continues. Inarra Saarinen has said "Our goal is to explore physical and virtual dance and movement and blended realities." There was, early on, an emphasis on the avatars, or virtual representations of dancers, being controlled by real people, rather than being moved by pre-arranged programming or artificial synchronizing devices of any kind.

Some of the differences between virtual dance and physical possibility were obvious from the start: in the first production, Olmannen (2007), dancers flew, morphed into non-human shapes, and performed other feats impossible in the physical world. At first, the productions more closely resembled physical dance than later, as the artists explored the possibilities and limitations of the virtual format. For instance, there are no restrictions on the height or duration of leaps, physical body joint limits, the number of turns, or gravity such as hovering or flying. The restrictions which can occur are usually due to "lag" or latency—timing difficulties stemming from the host computer interacting with the viewers' computers. But in Phylogeny (2009), which examined the reverse development of the species from humans to dragons, the lag was actually utilized in the choreography to allow differences in every performance where exciting interactions between the dancers could happen.

The basic elements of dance: telling a story via movement and music, or exploring movement itself, are the same as in physical dance. The stories are all original and were generally things that audience members accustomed to watching physical ballet would easily understand, while in some later works dancers have portrayed less recognizable things such as geometric shapes that move about the virtual stage in Avatara (2010).

As happens with ballet in the physical world, live music is sometimes performed for the dance. In 2008, the ballet Shuzenji was performed occasionally with Solary Clary (Sora Izumikawa in physical life) singing and playing the music live in real-time while the virtual performers danced.

One possibility involves using a machinima, a pre-recorded video of virtual dancers, with which the live performers could interact. This was first done in 2009 in Degas Dances.

Another of the ways in which virtual dance can expand more than physical dance is in the use of photographs. In traditional, physical dance, photos may be projected on a screen above a stage, but in a virtual world, the photo can become the stage, and the dancers can interact with it in a way not possible physically. This was first done in 2010 in one nine four two, a memorial to the true fate of the Czech town of Lidice in World War II which was destroyed by Nazis.

Ballet Pixelle has performed in non-virtual venues as well. The company has performed live in Berlin, Bhutan, Los Angeles, Melbourne, New York City, Tokyo, Vancouver, Yokohama, and Washington DC among others. Live dancers have also performed along with their virtual counterparts in several live presentations over the years.

Ballet Pixelle is considered one of the important pioneering companies in the arts in Second Life.

In addition, Ballet Pixelle has been used to extend and explore set design.

== Programming ==
Ballet Pixelle performs repertory from September through June at the Ballet Pixelle Theatre in Second Life. In addition, the company presents Saarinen's version of the Nutcracker, The Nut, or the essence of The Nutcracker, every December also in Second Life.

A secondary company, Ballet Pixelle Too (created in 2016), performs more experimental, eclectic works during the Summer season.

Ballet Pixelle sometimes tours to other locations in the virtual world, such as the Royal Opera, the Rose Theatre, and so on.

Ballet Pixelle also often performs in the real, physical world during the year as well in such cities as Berlin, Bhutan, Los Angeles, Melbourne, New York City, Tokyo, Vancouver, Washington DC, Yokohama.

== Technology ==
Ballet Pixelle is performed using the Second Life global virtual reality platform and blends in various real life (non virtual) performances. The animations are developed using motion capture, Poser, Avimator, etc. Motion capture is accomplished via both motion capture suits as well as the Kinect hardware system.

== Gallery ==
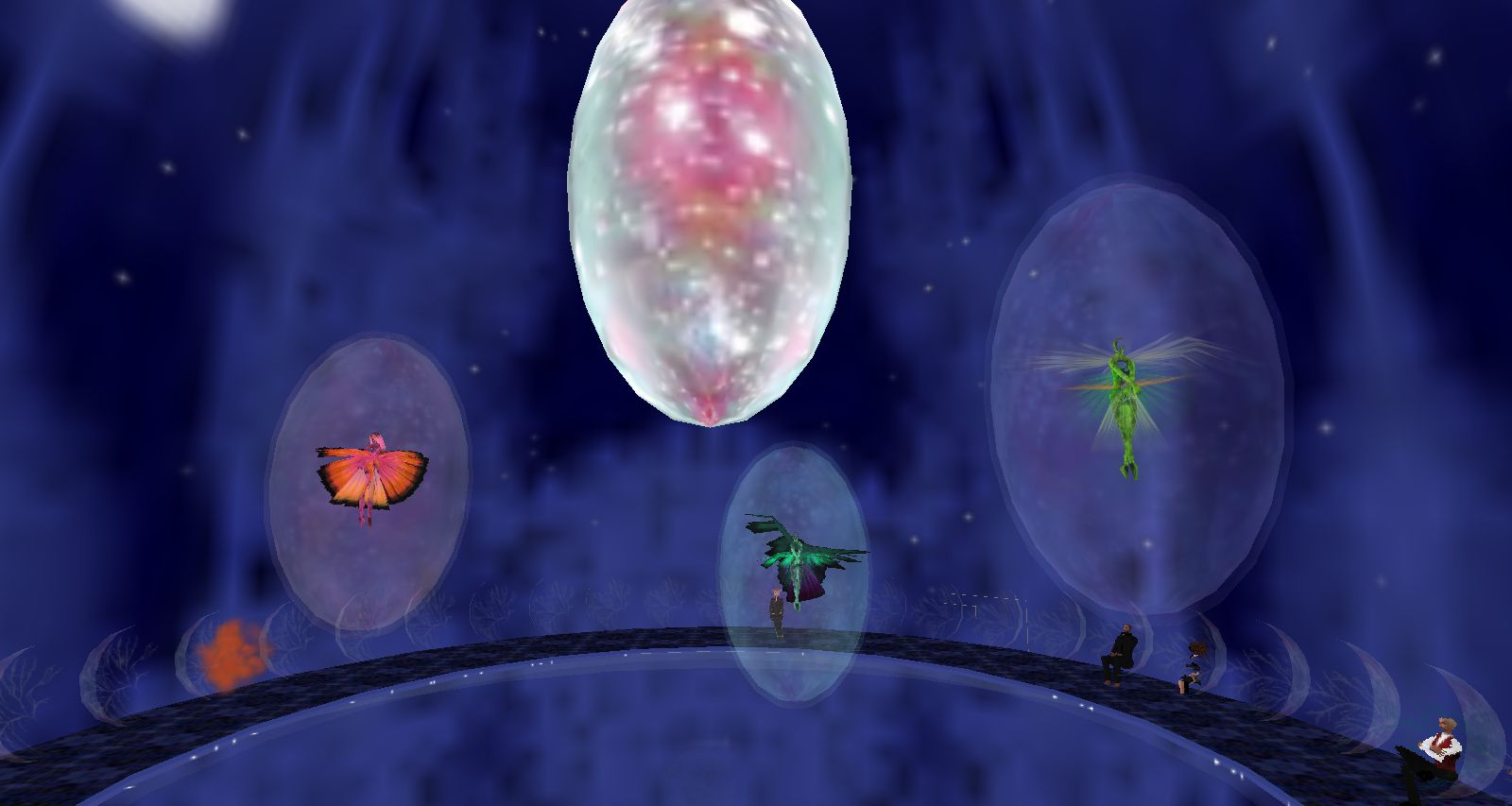
Chimera, 2015

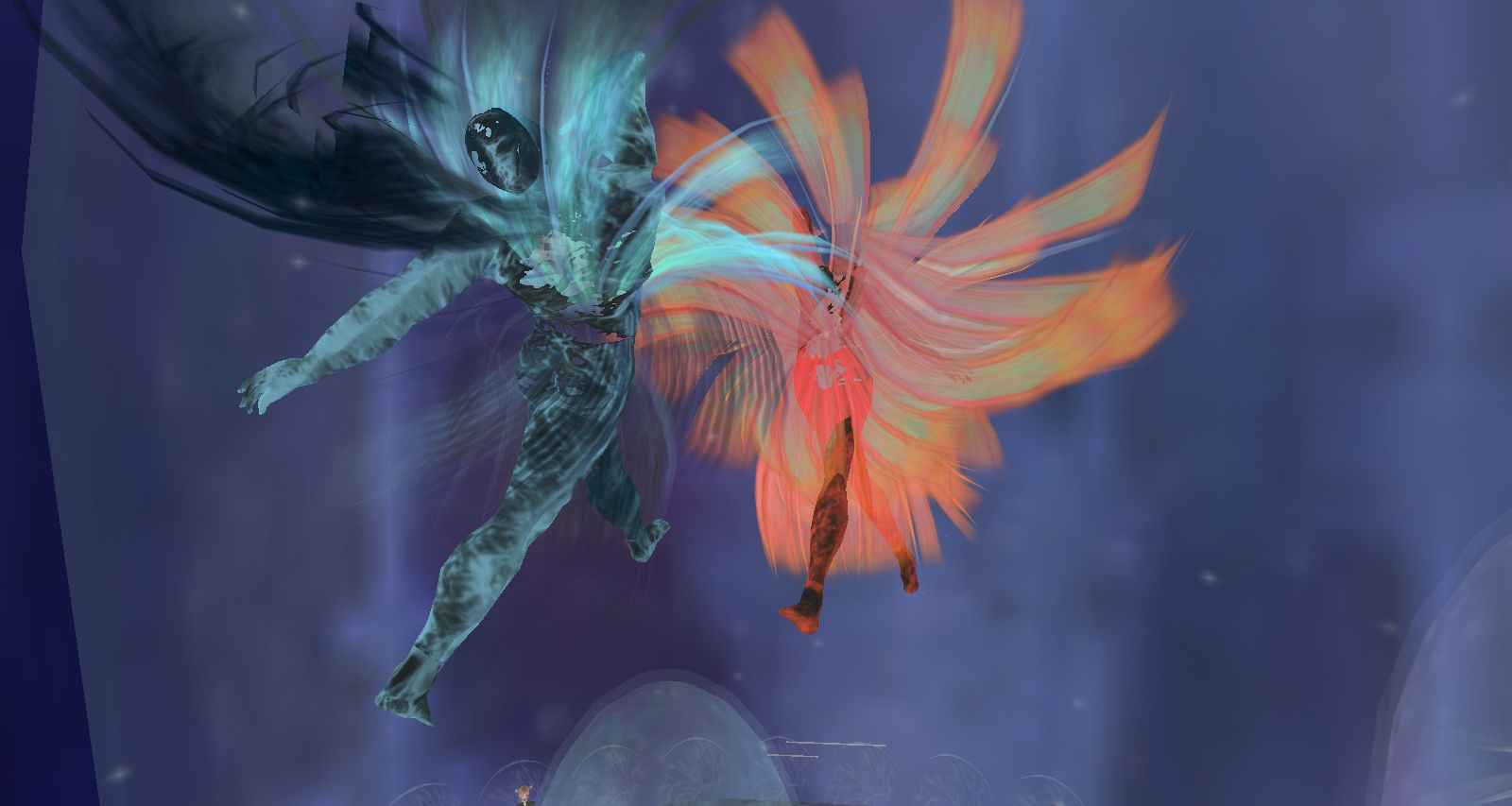
Chimera, 2015

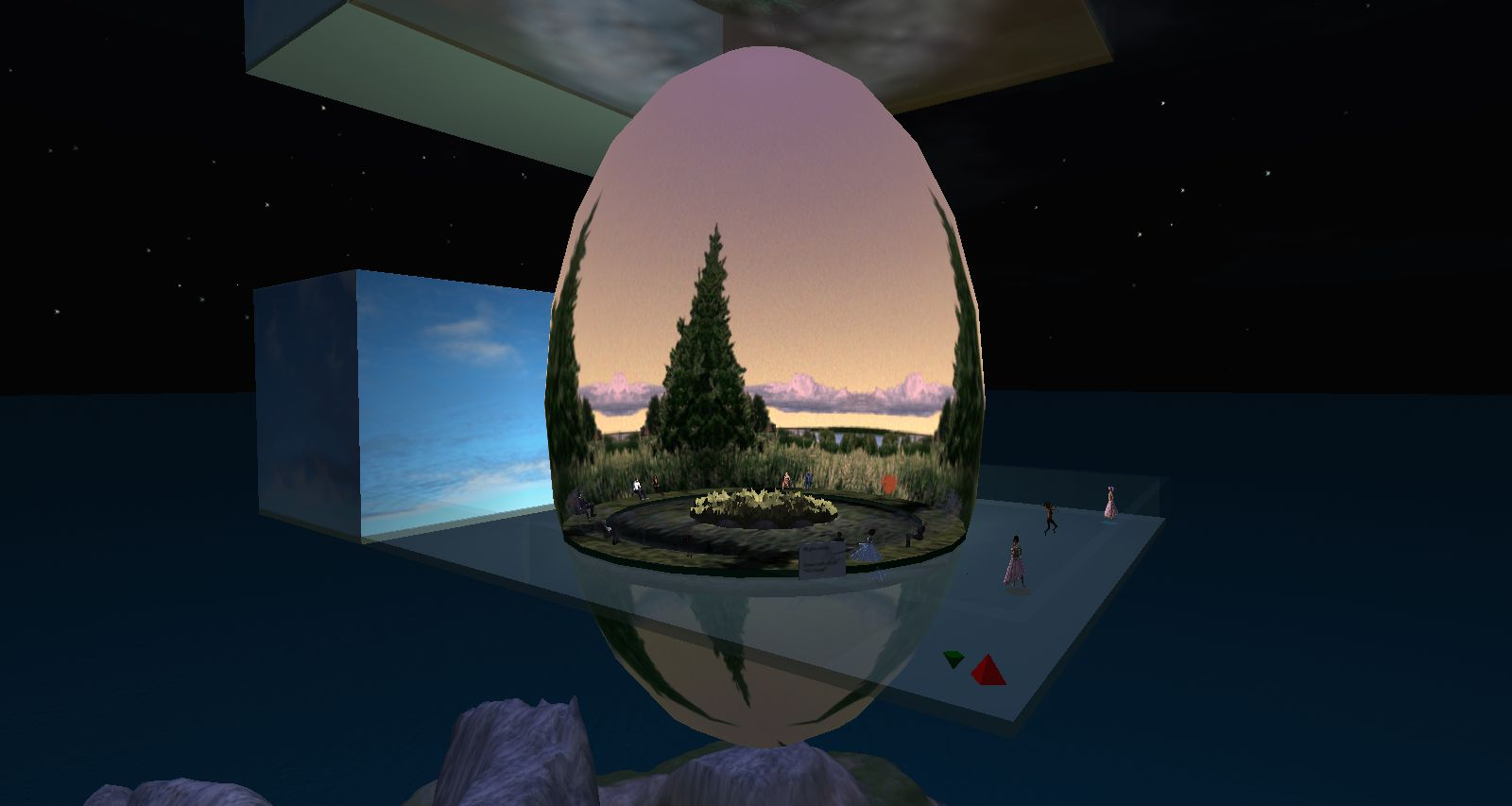
Chimera, 2015
