= Arts in Second Life =

Arts in Second Life is an artistic area of a 3D social network (called Second Life) that has served, since 2003, as a platform for various artistic pursuits and exhibitions.

== Art exhibits ==
Second Life has created an environment where artists can display their works to an audience across the world. This has created an entire artistic culture where many residents display art in the museums, galleries and homes they can buy or build using Second Life's tools. Gallery openings even allow art patrons to "meet" and socialize with exhibiting artists and has even led to many real life sales.

Numerous art gallery simulations (called "sims") abound in Second Life. Among the more popular galleries are the Sisse Singhs Art Gallery, the Windlight art Gallery and the Horus Art Gallery. Among the most notable of these was the art gallery sim Cetus Gallery District, the world's first virtual online urban arts district. Cetus was modeled on real world analogs such as New York's Chelsea gallery district as a mixed-use arts community of virtual galleries, offices, loft apartments, and coffee houses. Its many tenant-run businesses featured weekly live music performances, gallery openings, and literary events such as the virtual book launch for "Coming of Age in Second Life: An Anthropologist Explores the Virtually Human," by Tom Boellstorf (Princeton University Press; 2008). Cetus was chosen Best Cultural Site in Second Life in 2007, and its creator avatar Xander Ruttan (real world arts professional Aaron Collins of California), was among the most influential art world avatars in SL. Cetus resulted in many ongoing collaborative efforts among the SL community of artists, designers, writers, and virtual builders from across the real and virtual worlds. (Cetus was later bought by virtual artist DB Bailey and converted into a personal art project).

The modeling tools from Second Life allow the artists also to create new forms of art that in many ways are not possible in real life due to physical constraints or high associated costs. The virtual arts are visible in over 2050 "museums" (according to SL's own search engine).

In 2008, Haydn Shaughnessy, real life gallerist, along with his wife Roos Demol hired a real life architect, New York based, Benn Dunkley to design a gallery in Second Life. Dunkleys goal was to design an interactive gallery with art in mind in a virtual world. "Ten Cubed" is a radical departure in art exhibition, a futuristically designed gallery showcasing art in a unique setting. On January 31, 2008, "Ten Cubed" was launched. For its inaugural exhibition, Crossing the Void II, owner and curator Shaughnessy selected five artists working in and with modern technologies. These artists included Chris Ashley based in Oakland, California, Jon Coffelt based in New York, New York, Claire Keating based in Cork, Ireland, Scott Kildall based in San Francisco, California and Nathaniel Stern originally based in New York, New York now in Dublin, Ireland. Real life as well as Second Life editions are available from the gallery.

The virtual creations from the metaverse are disclosed in real life by initiatives such as Fabjectory (statuettes) and Secondlife-Art.com (oil paintings).

In April 2007, the huge gallery called crossworlds gallery opened its doors in Secondlife; therefore, the aim was to create an open space for art in virtual worlds. Also in 2007, artists Adam Nash, Christopher Dodds and Justin Clemens won a A$20,000 Second Life Artists in Residence grant from the Australia Council for the Arts. Their Babelswarm installation was launched in Second Life and The Lismore Regional Gallery in NSW, Australia on April 11, 2008, by Australia Council Chairman James Strong. In 2008, the French Artist Fred Forest had entered the virtual world of Second Life to show his art project for the first time in his country. He inaugurated his "Experimental Center of the Territory of M2" ("Centre expérimental du terrioire du M2"), where he invited politicians to discuss about sustainable development and digital identity card (Capucine.net). In another art project, he discussed about art institutions in France in his action called "l'art de la corrida".

== Live music ==
Live music performances in Second Life takes place in three distinctly different ways;

- With in-world voice chat, where the user dons a headset and microphone then enables a Second Life browse to "broadcast" his voice to other users, much like a telephone conference call.
- With streaming, where vocal and instrumental music by Second Life residents can be provided with the aid of Internet broadcast software, such as Shoutcast. This is input, via microphones, instruments or other audio sources, into computer audio interfaces and streamed live to audio servers. Similar to webcast radio, the audio stream from the live performance can be received in Second Life for the enjoyment of other Residents on their computer speakers. This started with performances by Astrin Few in May 2004 and began to gain popularity mid-2005. For example, the UK band Passenger performed on the Menorca Island in mid-2006. Another UK band, Redzone, toured in Second Life in February 2007.
- With inworld samples, where sounds samples are uploaded and an inworld user interface – instruments – is made to trigger those. Unlike streaming, performing with inworld samples make use of the Second Life environment and creates a three-dimensional sound experience to the audience. The Avatar Orchestra Metaverse is the most prolific representative with this approach.

Linden Lab added an Event Category "Live Music" in March 2006 to accommodate the increasing number of scheduled events. By the beginning of 2008, scheduled live music performance events in Second Life spanned every musical genre, and included hundreds of live musicians and DJs who perform on a regular basis. A typical day in Second Life will feature dozens of live music performances.

In 2008, the UK act Redzone announced they would release their new live album only via Second Life.

Redzone also began choreographing and synchronising their performances via MIDI in October 2008.

Many amateur performers start their music careers in Second Life by performing at virtual karaoke bars or Open Mic, then progress to performing for "pay", or Linden dollars, in-world.

== Filming with machinima ==
Film made in Second Life using machinima.

Second Life is popular for filming with machinima. Virtual worlds can contain all aspects of real world filming techniques as well as many more not possible in the real world. It is far easier to create 3D objects in Second Life and film them than create them from 'scratch' using traditional CGI software. There are many machinima and performing arts groups that are active in Second Life and which participate in creative events such as the annual 48 Hour Film Project. There are also several machinima groups that actively promote the works of Second Life artists such as Machinima Mondays, Rezzed TV, MAGE Magazine and the Machinima Artist's guild.

== Theater ==
Live theater is presented in Second Life. The SL Shakespeare Company performed an act from Hamlet live in February 2008. In 2009, the company produced scenes from Twelfth Night.

In 2007, Johannes von Matuschka and Daniel Michelis developed Wunderland, an interactive SL theatre play at Schaubühne am Lehniner Platz in Berlin, Germany.

In 2007, HBO hosted a comedy festival in Second Life, using live streaming audio. In March 2009, SL residents staged a two-day Virtually Funny Comedy Festival to "help build awareness for Comic Relief, Red Nose Day 2009 and of course, comedy in Second Life."

In December 2008, The Learning Experience, a not-for-profit virtual education campus in Second Life, staged its first live theater events with the production of two short plays, A Matter of Husbands by Ferenc Molnár and Porcelain and Pink by F. Scott Fitzgerald. In 2009, the TLE theater company began producing full-length plays in Second Life, starting with The Importance of Being Earnest by Oscar Wilde in February, and followed by Candida by George Bernard Shaw in April.

In 2008, The Avatar Repertory Theater company was set up. This is another Theatre company that works within SL.

In 2009, the Department of Drama at the University of Calgary mounted four short productions in the New Media Consortium theater as part of a class in performance in non-traditional spaces. These plays were (a) Guppies (by Clem Martini) in March (b) The Chocolate Affair (by Stephanie Alison Walker); (c) Kingdom of the Spider (by Nick Zagone); (d) The Boy Who Cried Genie (by D. M. Bocaz-Larson).

In 2011/12, an all-furry performing arts troupe, Ravenswood Theatricals, was launched at their own venue with successful, non-commercial virtual renditions of Andrew Lloyd Webber's The Wizard of Oz and The Phantom of the Opera, the latter of which was received with glowing reviews. A number of further productions of established real-life pieces such as Les Misérables, Tanz der Vampire, Sunset Boulevard, and Into the Woods are reportedly planned, as well as a gala presentation of various musical numbers from upcoming productions.

== Books ==
There have been several books written about experiences in Second Life. Second Life Love is example of such a book. It is a dialog between Per Olsen en Li Gang Qin about their partnership in Second Life. The authors have never seen each other in real life.
Other books include Second Life For Dummies by Sarah Robbins and Mark Bell, which was published in 2008 and provides assistance for new users of the virtual world, including basics, how to meet people, ideas for activities and places to visit, including how to access real life education in Second Life.

Additionally there are many poetry volumes available on Lulu and in SL, including the "Blue Angel Landing" volumes 1 and 2 with 3 due in 2019 which are compilations of poems written and read by poets in Second Life. Contributing editors include Persephone Phoenix, Huckleberry Hax, Hypatia Pickens and Grail Arnica. To find a generous collection of SL poetry books, visit Klannex Northmead's poetry library.

== Second Life artists ==
=== Annabeth Robinson ===
Annabeth Robinson, or AngryBeth Shortbread, creates online performances or installations using Second Life. For example, Robinson contributed to the 'Kritical Works in SL' project in 2008 to create a sound installation called Ping Space. This was a piece of work that involved two cubes reverberating sound from each other which would only happen when one cube was 300 ft above the other. Other such work can be found at the Annabeth Robinson page.

=== Garrett Lynch ===
Garrett Lynch is an Irish new media artist working with networked technologies in a variety of forms including online art, installation, performance, and writing. Since 2008, he has created a series of installation and performance works dealing with ideas of identity and place as they relate to networked spaces. In these works, Lynch explores the "real" and the "virtual" through the transposing of his own identity to virtual worlds such as Second Life without any attempt to masquerade or imagine a new identity. This process involves the use of his real name for his "representation" or avatar, word play that references his names origins as both real and Irish and the use of a sandwich board prop stating this that is worn continuously.

In 2010/2011, he was artist in residence at HUMlab, Yoshikaze Up-in-the-Air Residency. Outcomes of the residence have since been published as an artists book and an article in Metaverse Creativity (Volume 2, Number 2). Currently, Lynch has and is currently performing with a custom-built scale reproduction of his Second Life "representations" sandwich board. This has been worn at a number of exhibitions and performances.

=== Gleman Jun ===
Gleman Jun is an Italian artist in Second Life. In the dynamic effects of colors, lights and transparencies, he expresses his creativity in a constantly evolving and transforming himself. In his case, a work of art is composed of two different elements: vision and technique. "Vision" is the image that passes through his mind suddenly. "Technique" is the experience that allows the memory to translate the vision into a "real" and shareable object.

=== Patrick Moya ===
Patrick Moya (born 1955 in Troyes, France), is a Southern French artist, living in Nice on the French Riviera. He is a part of the artistic movement "Ecole de Nice". Moya has been at the forefront since the 1970s of straddling the latest forms of media and technology to benefit art rather than rendering it extinct. He is an early pioneer of video art.

=== Second Front ===
Second Front is the first performance art group of Second Life. Founded in 2006, its current seven-member troupe includes Gazira Babeli (Italy), Yael Gilks (London), Bibbe Hansen (New York), Doug Jarvis (Victoria), Scott Kildall (San Francisco), Patrick Lichty (Chicago) and Liz Solo (St. Johns).

Second Front members collaborate remotely and their performances have been shown live in New York, Los Angeles, Moscow, Brussels, Berlin, Vancouver and many other cities. The group has been written about in publications including Artforum, Art in America, RealTime Arts (Australia), Exibart (Italy) and Digital Art, (Second Edition) by Christiane Paul (curator).

== Second Life Art group ==
SL Art is one of the most popular art groups in Second Life. Its goal is to recognize the art in virtual worlds at the same level of visual art in real life. There are several second Life publications that work to promote Second Life Art, including Windlight Magazine, the SL Newser, and the SL Enquirer.
