= Bottle Fairy =

2005 video game

- Binzume Yōsei

瓶詰妖精 (Bottle Fairy)
- Genre: Comedy, Magical girl
- Created by: Yuiko Tokumi
- Anime television series
- Directed by: Yoshiaki Iwasaki
- Produced by: Atsushi Moriyama; Yukinao Shimoji; Nobuhiro Osawa
- Written by: Hideki Shirane
- Music by: Sora Izumikawa; Yo Yamazaki; Hiro Takahashi
- Studio: Xebec
- Licensed by: NA: Geneon
- Original network: TV Kanagawa
- Original run: 3 October 2003 – 26 December 2003
- Episodes: 13

Bottle Fairy (瓶詰妖精, Binzume Yōsei) is an anime series about four fairies who discover the secrets of the world from inside their little house. The show originally aired from October to December 2003 on UHF syndication in Japan, and each episode has a run time of only 12 minutes. It has been licensed in North America by Geneon and was released on two DVDs during 2005 and 2006.

== Synopsis ==
Bottle Fairy is a comedy series. The show follows a simple pattern, consisting of the Bottle Fairies misinterpreting the world around them. The fairies learn about Japanese culture and traditions with each episode taking place in a different month.

== Plot ==
The Bottle Fairies, who have come from another world, are attempting to learn many things about the world so they can gain knowledge and turn into humans - a feat they finally achieve in episode 12, set in the twelfth month, thus making the series span a whole year. However, as their wish to stay together is stronger than their wish to become human, they merge into one human, while retaining their several personalities. The thirteenth episode shows the fairies attempting to function as a single human girl, before eventually splitting into four fairies again. This extra episode makes Bottle Fairy the typical length of a small anime series.

== Characters ==
=== The Bottle Fairies ===
The Bottle Fairies are identified by their eye color, their individual quirks, and their association with the seasons (represented by season songs). They sleep in appropriately colored jars.

- Kururu is the blue Bottle Fairy; she has pink hair and blue eyes. She is associated with spring. Kururu is hyperactive, and what she imagines is often very extreme.

Voiced by: Nana Mizuki (Japanese); Sandy Fox (English)

- Chiriri is the yellow Bottle Fairy; she has blonde hair and yellow eyes. She is associated with summer. She is friendly and slightly reserved, with a surreal imagination. She is obsessed with soap opera and hats. She can also turn wishes into reality.

Voiced by: Kaori Nazuka (Japanese); Karen Strassman (English)

- Sarara is the red Bottle Fairy; she has grey hair and red eyes. She is associated with autumn. She is quiet, but what she imagines tends to be tomboyish.

Voiced by: Yui Horie (Japanese); Philece Sampler (English)

- Hororo is the green Bottle Fairy; she has black hair and green eyes. She is associated with winter. She is a somewhat distant character, with a slow, rambling personality. Hororo is always thinking about something and is usually shy meeting new people. She is often caught thinking about food.

Voiced by: Ai Nonaka (Japanese); Stephanie Sheh (English)

- Kusachiho, Her name is a contraction of the fairies' names by using the first Japanese character of each. She has what may be classified as dissociative identity disorder, and has the personality traits of all the Bottle Fairies. Which fairy is in control is indicated by the color of her eyes and her voice. Her color is orange. She only appears in the final two episodes.
- Rere is the purple Bottle Fairy; she appears in illustration book Bottle Fairy Funbook illustrated by Tokumi Yuiko (ISBN 4-7577-3099-3). She is not associated with the seasons. She has an energetic, serious character and almost always repeat her phrases twice with another different way of talking. Although Rere is serious-type and tried to push other fairies to work in order to become human, she always swayed or distracted by other fairies' happy-go-lucky and ended up running gags with them.

=== Other characters ===
- Oboro is a small feline toy with wings that was enchanted by the Bottle Fairies. Oboro is white. It floats gently up and down when it is not being held or played with (usually it plays with Hororo). He is a silent character, and has only one facial expression, the one that it was made with (generally suggested to be bored or exacerbated).
- Sensei-san, Bottle Faries' Papa, who is never given a real name, looks after the bottle fairies. He is represented by the colors brown and green. It is given that his character teaches them things about the world, but his appearances in the series are rarely significant. However, a love letter is a crucial plot point to the third episode. Though his job is never stated, the last episode shows that he is a teaching assistant at a university. Kururu, Chiriri, Sarara, and Hororo also develops a crush on him by the end of the series.

Voiced by: Kishō Taniyama (Japanese); Yuri Lowenthal (English)

- Tama-chan is the (approximately 5-year-old) next door neighbor of the Bottle Fairies and Sensei-san. In the 12th episode, March, she graduates from first grade. She is represented by the color purple and wears crayons in her hair with a large white ribbon down the back. She is happy to help the Bottle Fairies, who trust her (usually misleading) advice since she seems so self-assured. She occasionally expresses surprise at how childlike the fairies are even though they are supposed to be older than she is. Additionally, she was the mascot of the magazine Magi-Cu.

Voiced by: Haruko Momoi (Japanese); Rebecca Forstadt (English)

- Hanana is a plant that appeared in only one episode, and was cared for by the Bottle Fairies. It was enchanted to be immortal and stay in bloom forever, but they removed the spell when they realized Hanana would want to have children and spread around other flowers. Hanana does not have a color.

== Episode list ==
1. April: The fairies try to picture a school entrance ceremony, then animate Oboro-chan. They then try out Hanami.
2. May: Tama-chan explains several May things: the Golden Week, Kodomo no hi sekku, koinobori, kashiwa mochi, gogatsubyou.
3. June: Because of a letter sensei received, the fairies explore the highlights of love: confession, marriage, adultery.
4. July: The gang enjoys summer adventures in the jungle, in the mountain and a pyramid.
5. August: Swimsuits, the beach, pools, torrent, Matsuri, fireworks.
6. September: The fairies imagine their school life, with Japanese class, home economics, PE, medical check-up, school trips and graduation.
7. October: The fairies undertake an autumn themed poetic contest (dead leaves, typhoon, nabe), then a sports contest.
8. November: The fairies help a flower bloom, then use magic to prevent it from withering.
9. December: The fairies perform New Year's Eve activities: cleaning and cooking become a drama, Kōhaku Uta Gassen a historical.
10. January: First day of the new year, a time for Karuta, Onsen and aerobics.
11. February: The fairies make chocolate and give it to sensei-san.
12. March: For Hinamatsuri, the fairies receive a magic star that can turn them into humans.
13. And then: Merged as one human being, the fairies go to school to bring sensei his bento, joining the excavation, baseball and idol clubs on the occasion.

== Music ==
The series has one OP, "Oshiete Sensei-san", composed by Sora Izumikawa, and five variations of the ED composed by Hiro Takahashi. The ED has the same music and melody, but different lyrics for each version. The first four versions are named after the four seasons and are sung by a different Bottle Fairy according to her season. The final version, "Four Seasons Song", features all four of the Bottle Fairies. All five EDs are used in the anime, the first four playing three episodes each to roughly correspond with the progression of seasons and months and the final song playing in episode 13. Each episode of the anime also features a different ED animation corresponding to the month shown in the episode. Episode 13 shows multiple images to feature not only the fairies but also Sensei-san and Tama.

An OST, Bottle Fairy ~Four Seasons~, was released in both Japan and North America. It features image songs, the OP and the EDs, and instrumental music for the entire series.

Opening Themes
#	Transcription/Translation	Performed by	Episodes
	Oshiete Sensei-san 教えてせんせいさん (Teach me, Sensei-san)	Main cast	1-13

Ending themes
#	Transcription/Translation	Performed by	Episodes
1	Haru Uta ~Kururu~ (Spring Song ~Kururu~)	Nana Mizuki	1-3
2	Natsu Uta ~Chiriri~(Summer Song ~Chiriri~)	Kaori Nazuka	4-6
3	Aki Uta ~Sarara~ (Autumn Song ~Sarara~)	Yui Horie	7-9
4	Fuyu Uta ~Hororo~ (Winter Song ~Hororo~)	Ai Nonaka	10-12
5	Shiki Uta ~Binzume Yousei~ (Four Seasons Song ~Bottle Fairies~)	Main cast	13
