= Occultic;Nine =

Japanese light novel series

- The cover of the first light novel volume

オカルティック・ナイン (Okarutikku Nain)
- Genre: Paranormal science, suspense
- Light novel
- Written by: Chiyomaru Shikura
- Illustrated by: Pako
- Published by: Overlap
- English publisher: J-Novel Club (digital); Seven Seas Entertainment
- Imprint: Overlap Bunko
- Original run: 25 August 2014 – 25 September 2017
- Volumes: 3
- Manga
- Illustrated by: Ganjii
- Published by: Kodansha
- Magazine: good! Afternoon
- Original run: 7 October 2015 – 6 May 2017
- Volumes: 4
- Anime television series
- Directed by: Kyōhei Ishiguro
- Produced by: Shuko Yokoyama; Takashi Saiki
- Written by: Morita to Jumpei
- Music by: Masaru Yokoyama
- Studio: A-1 Pictures
- Licensed by: AUS: Madman Entertainment; NA: Aniplex of America
- Original network: Tokyo MX, GTV, GYT, BS11, ABC, AT-X, CBC
- Original run: 9 October 2016 – 25 December 2016
- Episodes: 12
- Video game
- Developer: Mages
- Publisher: Mages
- Genre: Visual novel
- Platform: PlayStation 4, PlayStation Vita, Xbox One
- Released: JP: 9 November 2017
- icon

Occultic;Nine (Japanese: オカルティック・ナイン, Hepburn: Okarutikku Nain) is a Japanese light novel series written by Chiyomaru Shikura, and is a part of the Science Adventure franchise. It was later adapted into a visual novel and published by Mages in November 2017. The light novel series is licensed in English by J-Novel Club. A manga, illustrated by Ganjii, was serialized in Kodansha's good! Afternoon from October 2015 to May 2017. An anime television series adaptation by A-1 Pictures aired between October and December 2016.

== Plot ==
Yuta Gamon, a second-year high school student at Seimei High who refers to himself as the “NEET God,” operates an occult aggregation blog called “Kirikiri Basara,” through which he attempts to generate income via affiliate links while personally dismissing paranormal claims as fraudulent. On February 24, he visits Seimei University to interview Professor Isayuki Hashigami, a physicist whose research into electromagnetic soul theory had generated both media attention and criticism from the mainstream scientific community. Hashigami's work proposed that human consciousness and memory function as electromagnetic data patterns—a theory dismissed by skeptics as pseudoscience but which carried implications regarding the existence of the soul. Upon arrival, Yuta discovers Hashigami's murdered body. The professor had been tortured prior to death, with his scalp removed and evidence of violent struggle present throughout the laboratory. Written on the floor in the victim's blood is the word “CODE.” While Yuta remains at the scene, a female voice emanates from his late father's antique “Skysensor” radio, instructing him to remove a gold tooth from Hashigami's jaw and leave the premises. Yuta complies, securing a key piece of evidence. Shortly afterward, Sarai Hashigami, the professor's son, arrives and finds Yuta standing over the body with blood on his hands, leading him to suspect Yuta's involvement in the murder.

The murder serves as the catalyst for the convergence of nine individuals in the Kichijoji district, each connected to the unfolding events through different circumstances. Yuta receives ongoing guidance from “Zonko,” his name for the voice communicating through his Skysensor—a vintage radio inherited from his deceased father, Koresuke Gamon, who had operated a small FM radio station called FM-KCZ in Kichijoji before dying from illness seven years earlier. Ryoka “Ryo-tas” Narusawa, Yuta's friend, demonstrates an unexplained ability to perceive supernatural phenomena and carries a toy gun called the “Poyagun.” Sarai Hashigami, a university student who shares the rationalist worldview of his father's critics, initially suspects Yuta but eventually becomes his ally after discovering his father's hidden research notes and an encoded list of names concealed in the professor's study. Miyuu Aikawa, a high school fortune-teller with a television following, had contacted Sarai several days before the murder during a trance state, urging him to visit his father immediately; her clairvoyant abilities prove accurate. Toko Sumikaze, an editor at the occult magazine Mumuu, receives Hashigami's research manuscript via a woman who claims to be his mother despite that woman having died years prior; her subsequent investigation reveals connections between her editor-in-chief, Kouhei Izumi, and a secretive religious organization. Ririka Nishizono, a reclusive doujin manga author, produces BL works containing occult themes that appear to predict actual events; her recent publication, At the Bottom of Dark Water, depicts scenes resembling both Hashigami's murder and a mass drowning, despite having been published months before either event occurred. Aria Kurenaino, who operates a curse-casting business, discovers that she was unknowingly involved in Hashigami's murder after a client commissioned a curse using the professor's hair, which had been delivered to her as a scalp prior to the killing. She is accompanied by Kiryu Kusakabe, a young man with an eyepatch whom she refers to as her “devil”; Kusakabe bears a resemblance to her deceased brother Takaharu and claims to have died and returned multiple times—he is an astral projection practitioner who gained these abilities following accidental exposure to a scandium isotope in an industrial accident. Shun Moritsuka, a 26-year-old detective with a childlike appearance and demeanor, has been investigating occult occurrences throughout Kichijoji and identifies Ririka's manga as containing warnings about an approaching disaster.

The investigation shifts following the “256 Incident,” in which 256 people are found drowned in Inokashira Park's lake on the night of February 25. The Musashino Police Department closes the case without pursuing criminal charges, despite the circumstances of 256 simultaneous drownings. Public speculation attributes the deaths to various causes including mass hypnosis, while official sources discourage further investigation. Through collaborative effort, Yuta, Sarai, and the other individuals decode a list contained within Hashigami's research, which consists of 256 names matching the drowning victims exactly. The list represents Hashigami's attempt to document evidence of a conspiracy conducted by the Society of the Eight Gods of Fortune, a religious organization functioning as a front for the Musashino Medical Group (MMG), a medical corporation with connections to Japanese political figures. The MMG has been conducting experiments combining physics research with occult practices, utilizing suppressed research attributed to Nikola Tesla. Their methods involve scandium, a rare-earth element administered via microscopic injections that passes through the blood-brain barrier and integrates with the corpus callosum permanently. Once present in the body, scandium causes subjects to respond to specific electromagnetic frequencies, enabling the MMG to influence their thoughts and behavior through transmitted signals. Additionally, when an individual with scandium implantation dies, the element enables the capture and preservation of their electromagnetic consciousness as an astral body. The MMG's objective is the “New World System,” a technological framework intended to provide immortality as a commercial product, marketed to wealthy clients who would receive continued existence as electromagnetic consciousness. The 256 victims constituted the first generation of test subjects, induced to commit suicide through electromagnetic signals transmitted from “Odd Eye,” a large antenna array located at an abandoned air force base near Kichijoji. The mass death represented a successful demonstration that the system could capture and maintain multiple souls simultaneously.

The group's examination of the complete victim list reveals that their own names appear among the 256: Yuta Gamon, Sarai Hashigami, Miyuu Aikawa, Toko Sumikaze, Ririka Nishizono, and Shun Moritsuka are all listed as deceased.

Yuta initially rejects this conclusion, noting that he can breathe, his heart functions, and he can interact with objects and other people. However, evidence accumulates. The individuals he has encountered since the incident, such as Saeko Kitaya, are also among the victims. Living people pass through them without recognition. Their phones connect only to each other. The café owner and other ordinary individuals have been absent from their interactions. The group determines that they are dead, existing as astral bodies—electromagnetic constructs containing their memories and personalities, sustained by the Odd Eye transmission. They drowned in Inokashira Lake on February 25, and their subsequent experiences have occurred in a ghost state. One finding provides a potential solution: the astral plane operates under significant temporal dissonance, with approximately one day of ghost experience corresponding to one minute of physical world time. The group's post-death investigation, which has subjectively lasted weeks, has occurred within minutes in real time. Their physical bodies remain in the lake, still within the medical window for possible resuscitation.

As the group prepares to oppose the MMG, the connections between their resources and two paternal legacies become apparent: those of Nikola Tesla and Koresuke Gamon. Yuta learns that his father's Skysensor had been modified beyond its original function. Koresuke, who had indirect connections to the Society through his radio counseling work that eventually evolved into the religious corporation known as the Hachifukushin Circle, had installed internal Tesla coils capable of generating high frequencies through resonance. This modification enables the Skysensor to receive astral transmissions and to channel substantial electromagnetic energy as a transmitter. The identity of Zonko is also revealed. The voice guiding Yuta is Aveline Tesla, the illegitimate daughter of Nikola Tesla. Aveline died during the Great Tokyo Air Raid of 1943, but her astral form persisted and eventually came to inhabit Ryoka Narusawa, whose family—the Narusawa medical clan—has historical connections to the Tesla legacy. Ryoka functions as Aveline's vessel; her outwardly frivolous personality conceals a spirit guide possessing detailed knowledge of Tesla's technology and the MMG's misuse of it. Aveline can communicate through the Skysensor as “Zonko” or speak directly using Ryoka's body.

Ryoka's toy, the Poyagun, is identified as a miniaturized Wardenclyffe Gun—a portable version of Tesla's tower designed to interact with powerful electromagnetic frequencies. It serves as the focusing mechanism through which Odd Eye can be destroyed. However, the Poyagun's capabilities are restricted by a “boot key,” which is not a physical object but a frequency pattern that Professor Hashigami encoded and concealed within his gold tooth to prevent the MMG from obtaining it. Yuta's role is explained by his possession of a rare biological characteristic termed an “Orphan Receptor,” which allows him to receive, store, and discharge electrical charges at levels exceeding normal human capacity. His vocalizations can generate electromagnetic waves, and when directed appropriately, he can produce substantial energy bursts. This characteristic makes him the sole individual capable of operating the Skysensor-Poyagun combination with sufficient output to overload Odd Eye.

With the MMG's plan approaching completion and limited time remaining before their physical bodies expire, the group attacks the Odd Eye facility. The operation requires four components functioning together: the modified Skysensor, Yuta's Orphan Receptor capabilities, the Wardenclyffe Gun, and the boot key. The boot key presents the final difficulty, as it cannot be activated physically but requires “mutual recognition”—a moment of shared belief and emotional connection sufficient to manifest its function. During the confrontation, as Yuta directs energy through the combined devices, the ghost of his father Koresuke appears through the Skysensor. Seven years after his death from illness, Koresuke's spirit manifests due to his son's emotional state and the deteriorating boundaries between planes. Father and son achieve mutual recognition, activating the boot key and enabling the Wardenclyffe Gun's full capability.

Yuta directs a large electromagnetic surge through the devices, causing the Odd Eye antenna to overload and fail. The resulting disruption terminates the broadcast maintaining the artificial spirit world, and the 256 captured souls return to their physical locations—their bodies in Inokashira Lake. Due to temporal dissonance, approximately nine minutes have elapsed in the physical world since the mass drowning. The group members regain consciousness in their submerged bodies while resuscitation remains possible. They surface and are recovered by emergency responders. The conspiracy is disrupted and the victims survive.

The outcome includes a significant loss. Yuta, having exhausted his astral energy powering the device and sustaining the connection until the others could return, does not revive. His body remains in the lake, his soul lacking the energy necessary to complete the return. Following these events, Yuta's ghost remains in the spirit realm, where he reunites with his father. The two observe the friends whose survival Yuta enabled—the former skeptic having sacrificed himself to demonstrate the reality of the phenomena he once dismissed.

== Characters ==
Yūta Gamon (我聞 悠太, Gamon Yūta)
Voiced by: Yuki Kaji (Japanese); Erik Kimerer (English)
A high school boy and self-described NEET living in Kichijoji who runs the blog "Kiri Kiri Basara," which aggregates news and discussion of the occult, with hopes of driving enough traffic to his site that he can live off the money from affiliate clickthroughs. He ends up attracting a strange crew of characters around him.
Ryouka Narusawa (成沢 稜歌, Narusawa Ryōka)
Voiced by: Ayane Sakura (Japanese); Faye Mata (English)
An energetic spirit guide with enormous breasts who is Yuta's best friend. Calls herself "Ryo-tas", and Yuta "Gamotan". She wields an electric stun-gun shaped like an old-fashioned raygun which is dubbed the "Poya-gun" according to Yuta.
Sarai Hashigami (橋上 サライ, Hashigami Sarai)
Voiced by: Kaito Ishikawa (Japanese); Robbie Daymond (English)
An ultra-realist first-year university student, in contrast to his father who is a widely-known professor who specializes in paranormal phenomena.
Miyū Aikawa (相川 実優羽, Aikawa Miyū)
Voiced by: Hitomi Yoshida (Japanese); Kayli Mills (English)
A popular fortune teller and first-year high school student with her own fanclub at school. She has recently decided to get close to Yuta, joining him and Ryoka to contribute to his blog. They all live in Kichijōji and go to the same school.
Tōko Sumikaze (澄風 桐子, Sumikaze Tōko)
Voiced by: Shizuka Itō (Japanese); Erica Lindbeck (English)
A reporter for the occult magazine Mumū.
Aria Kurenaino (紅ノ 亞里亞, Kurenaino Aria)
Voiced by: Miyuki Sawashiro (Japanese); Cristina Vee (English)
A black magic proxy who is said to place curses on others, provided she has a sample of the victim's hair and information. She runs her shop in Hamonika-Yokochō (harmonica alley) near Kichijōji Station. Her real name is Ria Minase. Her brother Takaharu died while donating a kidney for her. She was unable to accept the loss and stole her brother's corpse and lived with it for a year, believing that he was still alive with her.
Kiryū Kusakabe (日下部 吉柳, Kusakabe Kiryū)
Voiced by: Kishō Taniyama (Japanese); Greg Chun (English)
A mysterious individual. Aria thinks he is her ‘devil.’ Claims to have died many times, and appears to be a ghost currently.
Ririka Nishizono (西園 梨々花, Nishizono Ririka)
Voiced by: Mamiko Noto (Japanese); Michelle Ruff (English)
A dōjin manga creator with the ability to predict the future. She goes to the same university as Sarai's.
Shun Moritsuka (森塚 駿, Moritsuka Shun)
Voiced by: Tetsuya Kakihara (Japanese); Max Mittelman (English)
A cosplayer and otaku detective. He is small and looks like a child, but he is 26 years old.
Asuna Kisaki (鬼崎 あすな, Kisaki Asuna)
Voiced by: Satomi Akesaka (Japanese); Erika Harlacher (English)
She is an FBI agent who investigates the deaths of case 256. She specializes in psychometry (Touching the dead or the belongings of the dead and seeing their memories). She seems to have an appreciation for Moritsuka, in the anime they do not tell why, but it seems that something has happened between them so that she has so much appreciation for him.

== Media ==
=== Light novel ===
The light novels are written by Chiyomaru Shikura and illustrated by Pako. Overlap Bunko published the first volume in August 2014. The series was one of four titles originally offered by J-Novel Club, an online English light novel publisher, when the service first launched.

Three volumes have been released, and there was a planned fourth volume.

==== Volumes ====
| No. | Japanese release date | Japanese ISBN |
|---|---|---|
| 1 | 25 August 2014 | 978-4-90686-621-2 |
| 2 | 25 April 2015 | 978-4-86554-020-8 |
| 3 | 25 September 2017 | 978-4-86554-112-0 |

=== Video game ===
A video game adaptation of the novels was announced in March 2015. The game was developed by Mages and originally released for PlayStation 4, PlayStation Vita and Xbox One on 9 November 2017; it had originally been planned for 28 September as a digital-only release, but was delayed due to the addition of a physical release following complaints by fans. The physical PlayStation 4 and PlayStation Vita versions were additionally made available in a limited edition that includes a drama CD and a 64-page materials collection. Shikura has said that he is considering releasing the game in the West.

A Nintendo Switch port was announced in September 2018. It was set to include additional story content set after the main story, which would have further connected the entry to the rest of Mages's Science Adventure series. The story content was also planned to be added to the previously released versions as a free update. However, following an extended period of no additional information, it was confirmed to be cancelled during a livestream in August 2022. Shikura also stated that, if they were to revisit Occultic;Nine one day, it would be with a remake similar to Robotics;Notes Elite.

=== Manga ===
A manga adaptation, illustrated by Ganjii, was serialized in Kodansha's seinen manga magazine good! Afternoon from 7 October 2015 to 6 May 2017. Kodansha collected its chapters in four tankōbon volumes, released from 7 April 2016 to 7 July 2017.

| No. | Japanese release date | Japanese ISBN |
|---|---|---|
| 1 | 7 April 2016 | 978-4-06-388133-2 |
| 2 | 7 September 2016 | 978-4-06-388182-0 |
| 3 | 6 January 2017 | 978-4-06-388230-8 |
| 4 | 7 July 2017 | 978-4-06-388276-6 |

=== Anime ===
An anime television series adaptation was announced in 2016, with the cast from the game reprising their roles for the series. The anime was produced by A-1 Pictures and directed by Kyōhei Ishiguro with assistant director Miyuki Kuroki, with To-Jumpei Morita handling series composition, Tomoaki Takase designing the characters, and Masaru Yokoyama composing the music. The opening theme song, titled "Seisū 3 no Nijō", was performed by Kanako Itō, while the ending theme song, titled "Open your eyes", was performed by Asaka. Both theme songs were written by Shikura and were released on 26 October 2016. It premiered on 9 October 2016 on Tokyo MX, ABC, CBC, GTV, GYT and BS11. The series was released across six Blu-ray and DVD volumes containing two episodes each, totalling 12 episodes. Aniplex of America licensed the series for North America and released it dubbed in two Blu-ray sets (six episodes each) on 26 September and 26 December 2017. The dub was also made available through Crunchyroll on 5 February 2018.

List of Occultic;Nine episodes
| Title (Note: English titles based on Crunchyroll simulcasts) | Original release date (Note: The series is listed to premiere on Tokyo MX at 24:00 on 8 October 2016, which is effectively 9 October.) | |
|---|---|---|
| 1 | "Underwater"; Transliteration: "Takusan no Hito" (Japanese: たくさんの人) | 9 October 2016 |
Yuta Gamon, a high school student in Kichijōji, runs the occult blog "Kirikiri Basara" hoping to get rich quick. He and his friend Ryoka Narusawa recruit classmate Miyu Aikawa, a popular online fortune-teller. Elsewhere, Sarai Hashigami is urged to reconcile with his estranged father, Professor Isayuki Hashigami. Touko Sumikaze, an editor for the occult magazine Mumuu, discusses the Professor's work. Aria Kurenaino, a black magic medium, accepts a request to curse someone and later finds a bloody scalp in her mailbox. Yuta arrives at the Professor's office to find his brutally murdered and scalped corpse.
| 2 | "My Cold Dimension"; Transliteration: "Unmei o Kaeru Chikara Nante Nai kara" (Japanese: 運命を変える力なんて無いから) | 16 October 2016 |
A flashback reveals Miyu foresaw Professor Hashigami's death and desperately warned Sarai, lamenting her inability to change the future. In the present, Yuta finds "CODE" written in blood at the crime scene. A mysterious voice ("Zonko") on his Skysensor radio instructs him to retrieve a key hidden in the Professor's gold tooth. He succeeds just before detective Shun Moritsuka arrives. Moritsuka notes the crime scene mirrors a doujinshi by Ririka Nishizono; he secretly erases "CODE" and searches for a "list." Shun learns from Touko about the urban legend of Ria Minase (Aria's real name), who lived with her brother's mummified corpse for a year.
| 3 | "She Cracked"; Transliteration: "Mōsō Datta no Darou ka" (Japanese: 妄想だったのだろうか) | 23 October 2016 |
Miyu's producer friend Chizuru goes missing after encountering a strange albino boy. Shun interviews Ririka, who says the prophetic scenarios in her doujinshi come from dreams. A flashback details Aria's past: after being confronted with her brother's corpse, she attempted suicide and formed a contract with a disembodied "devil" (Kiryu Kusakabe). Paranoid about being framed, Yuta obsessively searches for a lock matching the key; he is attacked by an unseen entity (Kiryu) executing a curse placed on him earlier. Zonko then alerts Yuta to a breaking news report: a mass drowning at Inokashira Park.
| 4 | "Psycho Daisies"; Transliteration: "Hannin wa Gamon Yūta da" (Japanese: 犯人は我聞悠太だ) | 30 October 2016 |
News reports the "256 Incident": 256 bodies discovered drowned in Inokashira Park. Touko is assigned to cover the story. Yuta tries to capitalize on the tragedy for his blog. While researching Hashigami's death, Yuta finds a comment by Shun linking to Ririka's A Dark Water's Bottom, which eerily depicts recent events. Miyu seeks Touko's help regarding Chizuru, inadvertently connecting Touko to Yuta. Skeptical of occult theories, Sarai tracks down Yuta at Café Blue Moon and demands answers.
| 5 | "She's Lost Control"; Transliteration: "Koko ga Atarashii Sekai nano ne" (Japanese: ここが新しい世界なのね) | 6 November 2016 |
Sarai interrogates Yuta, who admits finding the body and taking the key. They realize the Professor's study was ransacked. Forming an uneasy alliance, they search the study; Yuta discovers a complex coded message hidden in the ceiling. Ririka has disturbing visions of drowning, realizing her drawings depict her own perspective. Shun tails Yuta to Café Blue Moon and pointedly questions him about molar extractions, revealing he knows Yuta has the key. Sarai begins decoding the message; it is a list of names matching the 256 Incident victims.
| 6 | "She Took a Long Cold Look"; Transliteration: "Anta no Hō dattan da ne" (Japanese: アンタの方だったんだね) | 13 November 2016 |
Aria informs the group about a kotoribako (cursed box) at Anmeiji Temple. Seeking clues about Chizuru, they rush there and encounter the albino boy holding a bloody box; he taunts them and flees. Miyu opens it and finds mutilated remains and Chizuru's hairpiece. Elsewhere, the shadowy "Society of the Eight Gods of Fortune" discusses experiments based on Nikola Tesla's research. Back at the station, Shun realizes no one can see or hear him—he is dead. Yuta finishes decoding the list and finds his own name, just as the news confirms him among the 256 victims. FBI agent Asuna Kisaki is mobilized.
| 7 | "The Dream's Dream"; Transliteration: "Jōei Kaishi" (Japanese: 上映開始) | 20 November 2016 |
Asuna Kisaki, an FBI agent with psychometry skills, arrives to investigate. Yuta, in denial, tries to prove he is alive. Returning a pass case to Saeko Kitaya, he learns she is also a victim—he can only interact with the dead. Yuta, Sarai, and Touko realize they are ghosts, invisible to the living. Touko suggests they are astral bodies—electromagnetic entities containing memories. Urged by Zonko, Yuta visits the morgue. As Asuna examines bodies, sensing the victims walked willingly into the lake, Yuta finds his own corpse; when she touches it, she briefly perceives Yuta's astral form.
| 8 | "Happiness Is a Warm Gun"; Transliteration: "Wareware no Tadoritsuita Kyūkyoku no Iryō na no da" (Japanese: 我々のたどり着いた究極の医療なのだ) | 27 November 2016 |
The group reels from confirmation of their deaths. The albino boy (Ryōzō) confronts Ririka, claiming the Society granted him immortality via "Scandium" injections, allowing his astral body to persist. Yuta visits his father's old radio station, where Asuna—having temporarily induced her own death to enter the astral plane—confronts him. She reveals Yuta's father was a high-ranking member of the Society (Musashino Medical Group, MMG). The Society discusses plans to use Scandium for global control. Touko discovers her editor-in-chief is involved and steals data on their experiments. Miyu receives a cryptic text from Chizuru's phone.
| 9 | "Future Days"; Transliteration: "Kitto Sekai wa Owaru ne" (Japanese: きっと世界は終わるね) | 4 December 2016 |
Lured by the text, Miyu returns to Anmeiji Temple and finds further evidence of Chizuru's fate. The group convenes as Touko reveals stolen data: MMG is using Scandium and electromagnetic waves to separate souls from bodies. They discover time dilation—one minute in the real world equals roughly one day in the astral plane—meaning revival is possible if they act quickly. Ririka confronts Ryōzō again; revealing he is the manipulated spirit of her aborted fetus, she visualizes his destruction as an astral being, defeating him.
| 10 | "Another Girl, Another Planet"; Transliteration: "Hontō no Watashi" (Japanese: 本当のワタシ) | 11 December 2016 |
Ryoka's behavior turns erratic and cold. Yuta confronts her; she reveals her true identity: Aveline Tesla, a descendant of Nikola Tesla, acting as a spirit guide inhabiting Ryoka's body. She admits she is "Zonko" (via the Skysensor). Aveline exposes the Society's plan to activate the "World System" via the Odd Eye antenna array, merging astral and physical realms, and confirms Yuta's Poya-Gun is the Wardenclyffe Gun capable of disrupting Odd Eye. Having grown attached to Yuta, Aveline betrays the Society to help the group.
| 11 | "We Want the Airwaves"; Transliteration: "Ōinaru Mokuteki no Tame yo" (Japanese: 大いなる目的のためよ) | 18 December 2016 |
Aveline details the Society's plan: Odd Eye will use the synchronized astral bodies of the 256 victims to boost World System activation, making their deaths permanent. The group finalizes a strategy to use the Wardenclyffe Gun and the Skysensor to overload Odd Eye before the time limit for revival expires. The Society, aware their plans are compromised, accelerates activation. The group begins infiltrating the heavily guarded Odd Eye facility, racing against time.
| 12 | "We're Gonna Have a Real Good Time Together"; Transliteration: "Okarutikku Nain" (Japanese: オカルティック・ナイン) | 25 December 2016 |
The group reaches Odd Eye's core as the World System activates. Yuta, supported by his friends and Aveline/Ryoka, uses the Wardenclyffe Gun and Skysensor to attack the antenna. He sacrifices his astral existence to overload and destroy Odd Eye. The energy blast severs the realms and propels the victims' souls back in time; due to time dilation, only nine minutes have passed in the physical world. The group awakens in Inokashira Lake and survives. The conspiracy is thwarted, but Yuta remains an astral being. His friends mourn his loss while embracing their second chance; Yuta reunites with his father in the astral realm.
