= Lovely Muco =

Japanese manga series

- First tankōbon volume cover, featuring Muco (front) and Komatsu-san (back)

いとしのムーコ (Itoshi no Mūko)
- Genre: Comedy; Slice of life
- Manga
- Written by: Takayuki Mizushina
- Published by: Kodansha
- English publisher: NA: Kodansha USA
- Imprint: Evening KC
- Magazine: Evening
- Original run: 12 April 2011 – 23 September 2020
- Volumes: 17
- Anime television series

Lovely Movie: Lovely Muuuuuuuco!
- Directed by: Takenori Mihara
- Studio: Doga Kobo
- Original network: Fuji TV
- Original run: 29 July 2013 – 23 December 2013
- Episodes: 21
- Anime television series

Lovely Movie: Lovely Muuuuuuuco! Season 2
- Directed by: Takenori Mihara
- Studio: Doga Kobo
- Original network: BS Fuji
- Original run: 27 April 2014 – 5 October 2014
- Episodes: 22
- Anime television series
- Directed by: Romanov Higa
- Studio: DLE
- Original network: TV Tokyo
- Original run: 3 October 2015 – 26 March 2016
- Episodes: 25
- Manga

Daisuki! Itoshi no Muco
- Written by: Takayuki Mizushina
- Published by: Kodansha
- Imprint: Evening KC
- Magazine: Comic Days
- Original run: 10 September 2023 – present
- Volumes: 1
- icon

Lovely Muco (Japanese: いとしのムーコ, Hepburn: Itoshi no Mūko) is a Japanese manga series written and illustrated by Takayuki Mizushina. It was serialized in Kodansha's seinen manga magazine Evening from April 2011 to September 2020, with its chapters collected in 17 tankōbon volumes. It tells the story of Muco, the Shiba Inu of glassblower Komatsu-san.

== Characters ==
Muco (ムーコ, Mūko)
Voiced by: Hitomi Yoshida
The shiba-inu pet of Komatsu.
Komatsu-san (こまつさん)
Voiced by: Shinichi Tanioka (Lovely Movie) / Satoshi Hino (TV anime)
A glassblower.
Ushikou-san (うしこうさん)
Voiced by: Mizuki Sano (Lovely Movie) / Junji Majima (TV anime)
A bar patron and friend of Komatsu.
Bōda-san (棒田さん)
Voiced by: Taisei Kurata (Lovely Movie) / Keiji Fujiwara (TV anime)
A local barkeep.
Rena-chan (玲奈ちゃん)
Voiced by: Sumire Uesaka
Bouda's daughter.
Shinohara-san (篠原さん)
Voiced by: Kaori Nazuka
Love interest.
Dr. Mutō (Veterinary) (むとう先生（獣医さん）, Mutō-sensei (Jūui-san))
Voiced by: Kazuhiro Watanabe (Lovely Movie) / Hiroki Takahashi (TV anime)
Tamaki-kun (タマキくん)
Voiced by: Yū Kobayashi (TV anime)

== Media ==
=== Manga ===
Written and illustrated by Takayuki Mizushina, Lovely Muco was serialized in Kodansha's seinen manga magazine Evening from 12 April 2011 to 23 September 2020. Kodansha collected its chapters in 17 tankōbon volumes, released from 23 April 2012 to 23 November 2020.

At Anime Expo 2022, Kodansha USA announced that they licensed the series for English publication.

A sequel manga, titled Daisuki! Itoshi no Muco, began serialization on Kodansha's Comic Days website began serialization on 10 September 2023. The first volume was released on 12 June 2024.

==== Volumes ====
No.	Original release date	Original ISBN	English release date	English ISBN
01	23 April 2012	978-4-06-352415-4	2 May 2023	978-1-64-729239-3
02	21 September 2012	978-4-06-352431-4	4 July 2023	978-1-64-729240-9
03	22 March 2013	978-4-06-352455-0	7 November 2023	978-1-64-729251-5
04	20 September 2013	978-4-06-352483-3	20 February 2024	978-1-64-729252-2
05	20 March 2014	978-4-06-354506-7; 978-4-06-358702-9 (SE)	—	—
06	21 November 2014	978-4-06-354538-8; 978-4-06-358749-4 (SE)	—	—
07	23 April 2015	978-4-06-354569-2	—	—
08	20 November 2015	978-4-06-354601-9	—	—
09	22 April 2016	978-4-06-354618-7; 978-4-06-358805-7 (SE)	—	—
10	22 November 2016	978-4-06-354642-2; 978-4-06-362345-1 (SE)	—	—
11	23 June 2017	978-4-06-354673-6; 978-4-06-358851-4 (SE)	—	—
12	22 December 2017	978-4-06-510577-1; 978-4-06-511017-1 (SE)	—	—
13	23 July 2018	978-4-06-512076-7; 978-4-06-512951-7 (SE)	—	—
14	23 April 2019	978-4-06-515222-5; 978-4-06-516235-4 (SE)	—	—
15	22 November 2019	978-4-06-517658-0; 978-4-06-518140-9 (SE)	—	—
16	23 June 2020	978-4-06-520005-6; 978-4-06-520004-9 (SE)	—	—
17	20 November 2020	978-4-06-521582-1; 978-4-06-521646-0 (SE)	—	—

=== Anime ===
In 2013 and 2014, a short anime based on the manga by Doga Kobo was used as interstitials on the Fuji TV programme Non-Stop!. A separate anime series started airing on 3 October 2015.

== Reception ==
Lovely Muco ranked sixth on the "Nationwide Bookstore Employees' Recommended Comics of 2013" poll by Honya Club online bookstore.
