= Sora Izumikawa =

Japanese singer-songwriter (born 1971)

- Born: Yumi Izumikawa (泉川 ゆみ); February 14, 1971 (age 55)
- Origin: Hiroshima, Japan
- Genres: Pop, Rock
- Occupations: Singer, songwriter, Producer, composer
- Instruments: Vocals, keyboards
- Years active: 1998–present
- Labels: Pioneer LDC, King Records, Pony Canyon, Meer Tracks, Columbia Music Entertainment, Vivid Sound, Dog-Rights
- Website: http://www.sorasora.com

Sora Izumikawa (イズミカワ ソラ, Izumikawa Sora; born February 14, 1971), is a Japanese artist, singer-songwriter, voice actress, composer and producer currently based on Japan. Also Ex-CEO for Dog-Rights Co., Ltd.

== Biography ==
Born in Hiroshima, Japan to a chorister father and mother who taught electronic organ, Sora started playing the piano at the age of two. She won a grand prix in the Hiroshima regional stage of the "Yamaha Popular Song Contest" (known as POPCON) when she was four, and went on to win a prize in the national competition. She was a prize winner in the "Yamaha Junior Original Concert" while still at her elementary school, where she discovered her interest in song writing. She is a graduate of Doshisha University.

She released her debut single 'Toushindai no Chikyugi' on February 14, 1998 and has produced various songs since. She formed DAUGHTER, a duo group with her real sister named marhy. She was a member of Spiral Spiders. The group toured in Japan and the U.S., and performed live concerts at Anime Central in Chicago. She is a well-known singer-songwriter for anime and manga and produces music for 'Binzume Yōsei' (Bottle Fairy). She uses the name Kumoko when writing theme songs for the anime and manga series 'Rave Master'. She is also a member of duo Hitomi Sora for 'Wagaya no Oinari-sama.', opening song. Sora (Avatar name: Solary Clary) also got called to compose a three series of ballet music for the fifth production "Shuzenji" for the world first virtual ballet group Ballet Pixelle (formerly Second Life Ballet) created by the director and founder Inarra Saarinen in Second Life(R). Also the ex-CEO of Dog-Rights Co., Ltd, by which publishing of free magazines called "Dog-Rights", to appeal better Japanese dogs' situations. Sora started a career as an Executive Producer by producing several music albums.

== Discography ==
=== Singles ===
- 1998: Toushindai no Chikyugi
- 1998: Yahoo!
- 1998: Time Capsule
- 1998: tu-la-la
- 1999: Zutto Motto
- 1999: Rocket de
- 2000: Futsu Densha ni Notte
- 2002: Higher and Higher for Rave(Rave Master) as Kumoko
- 2003: Cibimimi (for Ponkickies21 as Chibi Mimi)
- 2005: Scene Vol.1 CD and DVD
- 2007: Ubugoe (as a member of Spiral Spiders)
- 2008: Wagaya no Oinari-sama. (opening 'KI-ZU-NA' and c/w 'Kiseki' (lyrics/music-Sora Izumikawa)-singer as Hitomisora with Hitomi Yoshida)

=== Albums ===
- 1998: Sorae
- 1999: Hajimaruyo-1 sainari
- 2001: Ukare Beat Chika Ikkai
- 2002: Hagane Machine
- 2003: Tokyo Flamingo
- 2003: TRIBUTE TO FLIPPER'S GUITAR FRIENDS AGAIN
- 2004: DAUGHTER
- 2006: Sora Best-incl. New single Ningyohime
- 2007: 1981 PROJECT"THEME OF ROCKY"TOUR FINAL SHIBUYA AX (as a member of Spiral Spiders)
- 2007: SHANGHAI SWING – 1950 SWING COVER JAZZ (Compilation Album – Shanghai/Get Out and Get Under the Moon)
- 2008: aMERICAN SWING – Rock meets Jazz (sora&marhy=DAUGHTER feat. the fascinations)
- 2009: 11 ("juuichi" as eleven in Japanese)- debut 11th anniversary, concept album
- 2010: Smiles – concept album, for Label Dog-Rights, as Executive Producer, singer, composition, lyrics (arranger Masaki Narita)

=== Works for Others ===
- Bottle Fairy -Oshiete Sensei San (composition), Bottle Fairy (Nana Mizuki, Kaori Nazuka, Yui Horie, Ai Nonaka)
- Hitomi Mieno -Yahoo!
- Mariko Koda -Kokoro no Yajirushi, Sekaijuu no Post, Tomato (lyrics・composition) Ta・ra・ra (composition) etc.
- Megumi Hayashibara-Rumba Rumba (lyrics・composition) Kirameku Kakera (lyrics)
- Mayumi Iizuka -Itsumo no Kaerimichi, Soyokaze to café au lait, Duet de La La La, Drive Shiyou yo! (composition) in SMILE×SMILE, Mini Album 23degrees (composition), Akai kutsu no Cowboy in 10Love, Baby, dance with me♪ in Crystal Days, Stories, Fight!! and Kimi e... etc.
- Yui Horie -Happy happy * rice shower-type yui- (composition) etc.
- YeLLOW Generation -Lost Generation (composition) etc.
- K Matsumura (Kunihiro Matsumura) -Sorede Iinoda, Tomodachi to Shite (Producing for a project for Nippon Broadcasting System)
- Masaki Toriyama -Kawaita Mune (composition) etc.
- Sanpei -Sanpei no Everyday (composition)
- Miwako Okuda -Utau Riyu, Nichiyoubi no Asa (composition)
- Yui Ichikawa -Pure (lyrics・composition)
- Otoha-Hatsukoi -Koi no Hane (lyrics) etc.
- Mayuko Omimura -Shiawasena Takusan Juice no Shigeki (composition)
- Seiko Ishii -Ima mo Itsumo (composition)
- Tomoe Shinohara -Sutekina Nichiyoubi (lyrics・composition)
- KEN-JIN BAND -Rocket (composition)
- Ballet Pixelle (formerly Second Life Ballet) -Shuzenji (Ballet music 3 Acts), Living Goddess (Ballet music 3 Acts)
- Emiri Kato -Shiroi Kumo Oikakete (lyrics・composition),migite to hidarite (1st Single update) (lyrics・composition)
- Yoshimoto Gravure Agency (YGA) -Chiisana Happy Agemasho (lyrics・composition)
- ROCO -Sayonara Darling (lyrics)

=== TV ===
- Songra Series (TV Tokyo)
- Ponkickies, Ponkickies21 (Fuji Television) CG Character voice as "Chibi Mimi"
- Tokyo Kids Club (Fuji Satellite Broadcasting) CG Character voice as "Chibi Mimi"

=== Radio ===
- Izumikawa Sora no Doremifa Sorajio (RCC Broadcasting Company)
- Doremifa Sorando (FM Ehime)
- Izumikawa Sora no Ya-hoo! Station (FM Ehime)
- MIDNIGHT KISS Part2- Izumikawa Sora no Hochi-Kiss (Kiss-FM KOBE)
