= Hitomi Yoshida =

Japanese singer and actress

- 吉田 仁美
- Born: 13 July 1984 (age 42)
- Occupations: Singer; actress
- Years active: 2000–present
- Notable work: Reborn! as Haru Miura; Lovely Muco as Muco; Digimon Adventure tri. as Mimi Tachikawa; Occultic;Nine as Miyū Aikawa
- Musical career
- Genres: J-pop; anime song
- Instrument: Vocals
- Years active: 2008–present
- Label: Nippon Columbia

Hitomi Yoshida (Japanese: 吉田 仁美, Hepburn: Yoshida Hitomi; born 13 July 1984) is a Japanese singer and actress previously affiliated with Amuleto. She is known for voicing Haru Miura in Reborn!, Muco in Lovely Muco, Mimi Tachikawa in Digimon Adventure tri., and Miyū Aikawa in Occultic;Nine. Her singing career include theme songs in Our Home's Fox Deity, Heaven's Lost Property, Pretty Cure, and Kaitou Sentai Lupinranger VS Keisatsu Sentai Patranger.

== Biography ==
Hitomi Yoshida, a native of Chiba Prefecture, was born on 13 July 1984. After living in Germany for a few years, she joined Gekidan Tohai and started working as a child actress in the early-1990s. She was a regular cast member of Utate Odoronpa! from 2000 until 2007.

In 2006, Yoshida debuted as a voice actress in the Japanese dub of the Pixar movie Cars, voicing the twin characters Mia and Tia. Later, she voiced Haru Miura in Reborn!, Yuku in Jewelpet Happiness, and Luciano in Yu-Gi-Oh! 5D's. In January 2014, she was cast as Win in Hyperdevotion Noire: Goddess Black Heart. In March 2015, she was cast as Miyū Aikawa in Occultic;Nine. In May 2015, she was cast as Mimi Tachikawa in Digimon Adventure tri., and she reprised her role in the 2020 film Digimon Adventure: Last Evolution Kizuna. In July 2015, she was cast as Muco, the titular character of Lovely Muco. In July 2020, she voiced Rui Ōkami, the werewolf character in the Nocturne Boogie anime shorts.

Yoshida was the singer of all four ending themes of Smile PreCure! and DokiDoki! PreCure, the ninth and tenth installments in Toei Animation's Pretty Cure franchise. She sang (alongside Mayu Kudō and Tomoyo Kurosawa) "Pretty Cure: Eien no Tomodachi (2013 Version)", the theme song of Pretty Cure All Stars New Stage 2: Friends of the Heart. She sang both ending themes of HappinessCharge PreCure!, the eleventh installment in Toei Animation's Pretty Cure franchise, and voices Ohana/Cure Sunset in the last series' 28th episode.

Yoshida and Sora Izumikawa formed the singing duo Hitomisora for the 2008 anime Our Home's Fox Deity. She was the singer of "Ring My Bell", the opening theme of the 2009 Heaven's Lost Property anime, and she later returned for its sequel Heaven's Lost Property: Forte's theme song "Heart no Kakuritsu" and Heaven's Lost Property the Movie: The Angeloid of Clockwork's theme song "Second". She also formed the unit Blue Drops with Saori Hayami for the Heaven's Lost Property franchise. She and Tatsuhiko Yoshida sang the opening theme song of Kaitou Sentai Lupinranger VS Keisatsu Sentai Patranger (the 2018 entry of the Super Sentai metaseries).

On 28 May 2014, Yoshida's album ".htm" was released from Nippon Columbia. A second album, "10rder", was released from Nippon Columbia on 27 June 2018.

She has also appeared in several stage productions, including as Chizuru Yukimura in the "Hajime Saito Edition" of the Hakuoki musicals, and she appeared in the live-action dramas Kōmyō ga Tsuji and The Embalmer. In 2016, she began voicing Choromy, one of the puppet characters in the "Garapico" segments in Okaasan to Issho.

Yoshida announced her marriage on 13 July 2016, her 32nd birthday.

On July 1, 2024, she became a freelancer.

== Discography ==
=== Albums ===
Title	Year	Album details	Peak chart positions		Sales
Title	Year	Album details	JPN	JPN Hot	Sales
".htm"	2014	Released: 28 May 2014; Label: Nippon Columbia	—	—	—
"10rder"	2018	Released: 27 June 2018; Label: Nippon Columbia	—	—	—
"—" denotes releases that did not chart or were not released in that region.

=== Singles ===
Title	Year	Single details	Peak chart positions		Sales
Title	Year	Single details	JPN	JPN Hot	Sales
"Yay! Yay! Yay!" (B-side)	2012	Released: 7 March 2012; Label: Marvelous AQL	15	—	—
"Mankai Smile!" (A-side)	2012	Released: 5 September 2012; Label: Marvelous AQL	24	—	—
"Kono Sora no Mukō" (B-side)	2013	Released: 6 March 2013; Label: Marvelous AQL	11	—	—
"Pretty Cure: Eien no Tomodachi (2013 Version)" (with Mayu Kudō and Tomoyo Kurosawa)	2013	Released: 13 March 2013; Label: Marvelous AQL	47	—	—
"Love Link/Kono Sora no Mukō: Dokidoki! PreCure to Issho"	2013	Released: 4 September 2013; Label: Marvelous AQL	19	—	—
"PreCure Memory" (B-side)	2014	Released: 5 March 2014; Label: Marvelous AQL	13	—	—
"PreCure Taisō" (A-side)	2015	Released: 19 August 2015; Label: Marvelous	—	—	—
"Kaitou Sentai Lupinranger VS Keisatsu Sentai Patranger: Theme Song" (with Tatsuhiko Yoshida)	2018	Released: 14 March 2018; Label: Nippon Columbia	30	—	—
"—" denotes releases that did not chart or were not released in that region.

== Filmography ==
=== Anime television ===
2006

- Reborn!, Haru Miura

2009

- Jewelpet, Yuku
- Shin Koihime Musō
- Yu-Gi-Oh! 5D's, Luciano

2014

- HappinessCharge PreCure!, Ohana/Cure Sunset
- Mysterious Joker, Kira

2015

- Anpanman, Enokidakeyo
- Lovely Muco, Muco
- Ojarumaru, Fake Ojarumaru, Himegimi, others
- Omakase! Miracle Cat-dan, Rinnosuke

2016

- Occultic;Nine, Miyū Aikawa
- Okaasan to Issho, Choromy

2019

- GeGeGe no Kitarō, Chiyo
- Grimms Notes, Queen of Poison Apples

=== Video games ===
2014

- Hyperdevotion Noire: Goddess Black Heart, Win

2015

- Occultic;Nine, Miyū Aikawa

=== Original net animation ===
2020

- Nocturne Boogie, Rui Ōkami

=== Animated film ===
2015

- Digimon Adventure tri., Mimi Tachikawa

2020

- Digimon Adventure: Last Evolution Kizuna, Mimi Tachikawa

=== Live-action television ===
2006

- Kōmyō ga Tsuji

2007

- The Embalmer
