= Our Home's Fox Deity =

Japanese manga series

- Cover of the first light novel volume, featuring Kūgen Tenko

我が家のお稲荷さま。 (Wagaya no Oinari-sama)
- Genre: Fantasy comedy
- Light novel
- Written by: Jin Shibamura
- Illustrated by: Eizō Hōden
- Published by: ASCII Media Works
- Imprint: Dengeki Bunko
- Original run: February 10, 2004 – October 1, 2007
- Volumes: 7
- Manga
- Written by: Jin Shibamura
- Illustrated by: Suiren Matsukaze
- Published by: ASCII Media Works
- Magazine: Dengeki Comic Gao! (former); Dengeki Daioh
- Original run: February 27, 2007 – May 27, 2013
- Volumes: 11
- Anime television series
- Directed by: Yoshiaki Iwasaki
- Written by: Reiko Yoshida
- Music by: Yasuharu Takanashi
- Studio: Zexcs
- Licensed by: NA: NIS America
- Original network: Chiba TV
- Original run: April 6, 2008 – September 14, 2008
- Episodes: 24

Our Home's Fox Deity (Japanese: 我が家のお稲荷さま。, Hepburn: Wagaya no Oinari-sama) is a Japanese light novel series written by Jin Shibamura and illustrated by Eizō Hōden. The first novel was released in February 2004, with a total of seven volumes that have been published by ASCII Media Works under their Dengeki Bunko imprint. A manga adaptation by Suiren Matsukaze started serialization in MediaWorks' Dengeki Comic Gao! magazine in February 2007; the manga transferred to ASCII Media Works Dengeki Daioh in April 2008 after the former was discontinued in February 2008. A 24-episode anime adaptation produced by Zexcs aired in Japan between April and September 2008.

== Plot ==
Tōru and Noburo are brothers of the Takagami family who have just returned to their late mother's hometown of Mitsukawa. Toru has Yin in his blood and is constantly targeted by the yōkai and other creatures lurking in Japan. When Tōru is targeted by one, his brother Noburo releases the fox deity Kūgen Tenko who protects Tōru from the monster. Kūgen now acts as the protector of Tōru and Noburo to keep them safe from any threats while simultaneously trying to adapt to the modern world.

== Characters ==
Kūgen Tenko (天狐 空幻, Tenko Kūgen)
Female Voiced by: Yukana
Male Voiced by: Yuichi Nakamura
The main protagonist of the series. Kūgen is a fox deity, and has been the Guardian of the Mizuchi family for centuries. Kūgen was sealed by one of their Water Priests because of their mischievous behavior, and was only let out when their services were needed. Kūgen was fully released by Noboru after Tōru was targeted by a demon and now serves as their guardian (they themself insisted on it, as them being fully released made them "out of a job"). Kūgen's powers are so great that they can defeat most opponents with just their own offensive techniques. They often demonstrates great knowledge, and is able to figure out ways to beat an opponent even while at a disadvantage. Kūgen's natural element is metal (which is attributed to furred animals in the five elements), though Kūgen often uses fire magic and has also shown control over water if it is present. Despite their knowledge, Kūgen is often amazed by many things due to being sealed for long periods of time; as such, Kūgen is excited or surprised by various technologies and their uses, particularly early in the series.
As a fox deity, Kūgen is capable of transformation, and often appears as either a human male or female in addition to their natural form, because they have forgotten their actual gender. When speaking, Kūgen uses the pronoun ore (俺) for self-reference, which is usually used by males in Japan. Kūgen attracts a fair bit of attention in either human form because of their blonde hair and blue eyes, often resulting in a crowd of people of whichever gender is opposite Kūgen's apparent gender (in an omake, they are in male form while at the beach since Kūgen does not want to be bothered by a bunch of guys; that did not work either, as a crowd of girls gathers instead). In human form, Kūgen often leaves their fox ears visible, choosing to either fully transform or simply wear a hat over them (the ears can involuntarily re-appear if Kūgen gets significantly distracted or excited). Kūgen loves food, and will happily do various things to get some, such as taking a part-time job thinking they will get free food for the work.
Kō (コウ)
Voiced by: Saori Hayami
Kō is the "sentinel" of the Mizuchi family. She is sent to keep an eye on the Takagami brothers and Kūgen, and therefore lives in Noboru's house. She tries to be helpful, is dedicated to her job, and does not want to be a bother. As her skills focus on being a sentinel, she initially deals with common household tasks poorly and is mainly proficient in combat. She is also socially inexperienced, among other things (such as her method of describing things, which is to try to mimic the action/sounds, with little comprehension resulting) which tends to lead her to be seen as a bit of an oddball despite her very serious manner.
Noboru Takagami (高上 昇, Takagami Noboru)
Voiced by: Takahiro Mizushima
Noboru is the eldest son of the Takagami family. He is sixteen years old and was made aware that he is the head of the Mizuchi family in the beginning of the series. He is in the badminton club with Misaki Sakura. He has no spiritual powers, but is very calm in many situations and can understand others well; he can often handle situations by talking it through. Despite his lack of spiritual power, he has become able to more easily recognize human-transformed beings.
Tōru Takagami (高上 透, Takagami Tōru)
Voiced by: Yu Shimamura
Tōru is the youngest son of the Takagami family. He is eleven years old and has strong Yin in his blood, which draws yōkai to him for various reasons. Because of this, he also has a weak sense for spirits, and is able to fully see and talk with his mother during her Soul Ascension.
Misaki Sakura (佐倉 美咲, Sakura Misaki)
Voiced by: Yui Kano
Misaki is a friend of Noboru's from school who wants to be more than friends with him. She has an overactive imagination and jumps to conclusions about other people's relationships to Noboru, especially Kūgen and Kō, as they live at his house. At one point, Kūgen uses a technique on Misaki that temporarily turns her into a temporarily powerful guardian for Noboru. She herself has no knowledge of this, as she is unconscious while in that state.

=== Supporting characters ===
Tsukuyomi (月読)
Voiced by: Rie Kugimiya
A kami from the Department of Custody's Group 1, an organization that finds and protects, controls, seals, or destroys objects and beings that are potentially dangerous to society. Tsukuyomi is usually seen with their companion Bekira. Tsukuyomi has some history with Kūgen. As in Japanese mythology, Tsukuyomi does not have a defined gender.
Bekira (汨羅)
Voiced by: Masumi Asano
Bekira is a bokor who is an employee of the Department of Custody's Group 1. She specializes in magic-based therapies against all spiritual and other diseases which she treats accordingly as well as treating Tsukuyomi's disease. In response to the question of what species she is, she answers with "I chose to stop being human". When she first appears, she is traveling with Tsukuyomi searching for Byakki (who had been stolen from their custody). She helps Kūgen stop Momiji Miyabe when she controls numerous people she had bitten.
Miyako Takagami (高上 美夜子, Takagami Miyako)
Voiced by: Yui Horie
Miyako is Tōru's and Noboru's mother, who died shortly after Tōru's birth. She had a friendship with Kūgen, and adores cute things, including animal mascots. Early in the series, Ebisu informs Kūgen that her spirit had not yet passed on, which leads her to do a Soul Ascension, both for Miyako to pass on, and for Tōru to meet her.
Haruki Takagami (高上 春樹, Takagami Haruki)
Voiced by: Mitsuru Miyamoto
Haruki is Tōru's and Noboru's father. He has been raising his sons since Miyako's death. He has an amazing tolerance for the mystical.
Ebisu (恵比寿)
Voiced by: Daisuke Ono
Ebisu is the local deity of the area where the Takagami brothers live. Ebisu is the "god of commerce". He runs a convenience store close to his shrine where he has two stone imperial guardian lions named Kōga and Eiga, which he can bring to life. He is a real god unlike a yōkai like Kūgen Tenko, so he is able to overpower Kūgen without trying too much especially by using kotodama, since he is the most powerful while in his territory. He appears jovial and friendly, but is extremely sharp, sly, and sometimes harsh. He keeps note of any new yōkai that enter his domain.
Enjyu (槐, Enju)
Voiced by: Yū Asakawa
Enjyu is an oni with orange hair, usually done up with two buns covering her horns. She is the leader of the local group of oni that runs a church. She desires Byakki as whoever is imprinted by her will be recognized as the king of the oni. She is very kind and cares about all of her people; she would not kill Tōru despite him being the one currently imprinted by Byakki. She and the other oni have a love for the internet and online shopping, having paid for Byakki's delivery and obtained various other powerful items that way.
Byakki "Shiro-chan" (シロ, Shiro)
Voiced by: Rie Kugimiya
Byakki is a White Oni (the only one of her kind). Unlike other oni, she does not have horns, and her entire appearance is white. Her skin and hair are both naturally white, and she only wears white (though she is not seen dressed in anything but wraps that seal her powers most of the time). The other non-white feature she has is her eyes, which are a deep red. Byakki has extreme offensive prowess at the cost of virtually no defensive capabilities. Along with her offensive abilities, she feeds off of the forces of other beings, absorbing from them with no more than a momentary contact with her hand or even her clothing; the amount she drains varies, usually just leaving the being affected weakened but can cause them to collapse for several days if she takes a large amount. She was given the name Shiro by Tōru when he first met her, since no one there knew her real name.
Gyokuyou Tenko (天狐玉曜)
Male Voiced by: Wataru Hatano
Female Voiced by: Mikako Takahashi
Gyokuyou is a silver fox deity who is the half-sibling of Kūgen. Unlike Kūgen, Gyokuyou does not prefer to live with humans, largely due to Kūgen's sealing. Gyokuyou was given the nickname "Tama" by Tōru when they first met.
Mubyou (六瓢)
Voiced by: Kaori Mizuhashi
Mubyou is the "God of Vagabonds" of a nearby land that protects the Sakasaen, as well as several other lands. She travels between each of them, residing in each for a year before moving on to the next. She wears a mask resembling an owl, but most people see it as that of a tanuki. Because she cannot watch one area constantly, she has a duplicate puppet of herself watch the lands she is not in.
Mubyou (duplicate puppet)
Voiced by: Kaori Mizuhashi
Mubyou has a puppet that appears like herself and fills in for her while she travels between the lands she watches. Her two sock puppets, which also act as her hands, take the form of a guardian wolf beast and a guardian sheep beast. After they were destroyed, as well as herself getting injured, Mubyou repaired her, as well as giving her new, human-style hands. Because of her desire to be complimented and cared for by Mubyou, she threatened Tōru and tried to get Mubyou and Kūgen to fight to the death. When her plans failed, resulting in herself being temporarily consumed in flames, she cries, telling Mubyou why she did it all, and apologizes. Afterwards, she continues to watch the land in Mubyou's absence and helps the other characters.
Momiji Miyabe (宮部 紅葉, Miyabe Momiji)
Voiced by: Shizuka Itō
Momiji Miyabe is a purple-haired student at Akagi High School (which Noboru goes to) where she is the school diva. Her family is the benefactors of the Department of Custody. She has been living alone since her parents are both gone as her father Jyuzou works away from home, which leads Momiji to eventually try to attack the Takagami brothers, hoping she could get her father worried and come home. Momiji has a tendency to flirt with Noboru after developing a liking for him. Momiji is actually a Golden Werewolf who can temporarily turn others into werewolves that she controls by biting them. Her victims can be cured by the effects by a specialized injection that is either the same or similar to the one that suppresses Momiji's own powers, which her back to her human form. When Kūgen defeats Momiji, Bekira arrives and throws a special injection needle at her. Noboru and Kiyomaro tell Momiji that her father still cares for her despite being away and not to be angry with him.

== Media ==
=== Light novels ===
Our Home's Fox Deity began as a series of light novels written by Jin Shibamura and drawn by Eizō Hōden. The novels are published by ASCII Media Works under their Dengeki Bunko publishing label. The first novel was released on February 10, 2004, with a total of seven volumes that been published since. Although the series has not been officially declared to be on hiatus, there have been no additional light novels published since the seventh volume's release on October 1, 2007. In 2003, the first novel in the series won the Gold Prize in the tenth Dengeki Novel Prize contest.

No.	Release date	ISBN
01	January 2, 2004	978-4840226110
02	January 7, 2004	978-4840227261
03	January 10, 2004	978-4840228312
04	January 4, 2005	978-4840230261
05	January 10, 2005	978-4840231756
06	January 11, 2006	978-4840236041
07	October 1, 2007	978-4840240314

=== Manga ===
A manga adaptation illustrated by Suiren Matsukaze started serialization in MediaWorks' Dengeki Comic Gao! magazine on February 27, 2007. On February 27, 2008, the manga ended serialization in Dengeki Comic Gao!, but continued serialization in ASCII Media Works' manga magazine Dengeki Daioh that began on April 21, 2008, and ended on May 27, 2013. Eleven tankōbon volumes have been released under ASCII Media Works' Dengeki Comics label.

=== Anime ===
A 24-episode anime adaptation produced by the animation studio Zexcs, directed by Yoshiaki Iwasaki, and written by Reiko Yoshida aired in Japan on the Chiba TV television network between April 6 and September 14, 2008. NIS America licensed the anime series and released it in North America. Three theme songs are used: one opening theme, and two ending themes. The opening theme, "Ki-Zu-Na: Haruka Naru Mono e (KI-ZU-NA 〜遥かなる者へ), is performed by Hitomisora (Yoshida Hitomi & Sora Izumikawa). The first ending theme, "Kaze ga Nanika o Iō to Shiteiru" (風がなにかを言おうとしている), is performed by Saori Hayami, and was used for the first eighteen episodes. The second ending theme, "Shiawase no Kotodama" (シアワセの言霊), is performed by Yukana, Saori Hayami, and Mikako Takahashi, who are the voice actresses for three female characters in the anime.
