= Redzone =

- Origin: London, England
- Genre: Electronica
- Years active: 1997–2020
- Label: Phasechange Recordings
- Members: Justin Gagen
- Past members: Ami Wilson
- Website: http://www.redzone.co.uk

Redzone was a multi-genre band from London, England. Founded by Ami Wilson (vocals, guitar, electric violin, synth, drums, effects, programming, production) and Justin Gagen (guitar, slide guitar, bass guitar, drums, effects, engineering, production), Redzone were early adopters, among UK bands, in the use of the Internet to distribute music and video.

After recording demos in 1997, they released two MP3 web singles in 1998, "Torrid" / "Crime of Passion" and "Layer6" / "Body Craves". Their debut CD Modified came out in 1999 on their own Phasechange Recordings label, and was followed by [Digital Flesh] in 2005, containing an interactive, multi-threaded CD-ROM video.

Redzone were credited by Wired UK and Reuters, as being the first band to tour in Second Life in February 2007. They co-promoted and performed at the Scorched Earth Festival, which took place on 1 May 2007.

The third Redzone studio album, Abstract Revolution was released on 20 June 2008, and a track was played on BBC Radio 4, on 15 March 2009.

The White Sun DVD was released on 12 December 2008. A single, "Film Noir" was released on 27 May 2010, and the White Sun DVD soundtrack album on 20 November 2010.

The first in a series of three download-only EPs, Ultrastructure volume I was released on 1 May 2011 at the Mayday Mayhem Festival in Second Life. The event was curated by Redzone. The second in the series, Ultrastructure volume II was released on 31 October 2011, and volume III on 30 September 2013.

Redzone have, since 2011, been largely concerned with improvisation in live shows and have released a series of albums based upon this practice. These include Gathering of The Tribes and Venus Smiles, and a series of performances recorded at their 'Atropine' venue in Second Life, collectively known as 'The Atropine Tapes'. The first of these, Eject and Survive was released in October 2011, the second, The Breeding Station in November 2012, and the third, Einfangen on 4 May 2013.

Redzone appeared on BBC Television on 21 June 2013, and were extensively featured in a chapter entitled 'Performing Live in Second Life' in The Oxford Handbook of Music and Virtuality, published in 2016.

The founders of Redzone created The Internet Audio Cyclotron (IAC) in 2015, and used this tool to produce two albums: Noise Ocean in 2015 and Cracked in 2016. Gagen and Wilson also produced Aurosion: Eroding Sonic Landscapes with the Internet Audio Cyclotron, using the IAC in 2016.

Wilson released her debut solo album I Hear You (as Kassia Flux) in 2018, and the follow-up Ergot in The Wine in 2019. She was named a BBC Radio 3 Late Junction `One to Watch' for 2019.

Wilson died following a long illness on 25 March 2020.

== Discography ==
- Redzone - Modified (album) (1999)
- Redzone - Digital Flesh (album) (2005)
- Redzone - Abstract Revolution (album) (2008)
- Redzone - White Sun (album) (2010)
- Redzone - "Film Noir" (single) (2010)
- Redzone - Gathering of The Tribes (album) (2011)
- Redzone - Venus Smiles (album) (2011)
- Redzone - Eject and Survive (album) (2011)
- Redzone - Ultrastructure vol.I (EP) (2011)
- Redzone - Ultrastructure vol.II (EP) (2011)
- Redzone - The Breeding Station (album) (2012)
- Redzone - Einfangen (album) (2013)
- Redzone - Ultrastructure vol.III (EP) (2013)
- Redzone - Carved in Stone (album) (2013)
- Redzone - The Proliferation of Hybrids (album) (2014)
- Redzone - Noise Ocean (album) (2015)
- Redzone - Cracked (album) (2016)
- Kassia Flux - I Hear You (2018)
- Kassia Flux - Ergot in The Wine (2019)
