= Metaverse Shakespeare Company =

Second Life theatrical company

- Company type: Private
- Genre: Theatrical company
- Key people: Ina Centaur (visual director)
- Website: www.slshakespeare.com

The Metaverse Shakespeare Company, (previously known as the SL Shakespeare Company) produces Shakespearean and other plays in the Second Life virtual world. Professional and amateur talent is used for productions in a replica of the Globe Theater. The actors are special purpose avatars, controlled by prerecorded and real time live input. The initial program audiences are residents of Second Life, however performances are available outside Second Life. The first abbreviated performance was of a scene from Hamlet in February 2008 under the guidance of Ina Centaur, the company’s Visual Director. The company is funded by donations.

== Theaters in Second Life ==
=== The Globe Theater ===
The Globe Theater in Second Life is life-size from the viewpoint of a Second Life user. The reconstruction includes the theater from the outer walls, to the inside seating galleries, to the stage. It is the most historically accurate 3D rendition of the theater on the Internet. All of the building components which are visible to the audience resemble the modern-day replica in London. To view a live production, a Second Life avatar stands on the floor or sits in a gallery seat. Similar to a non-virtual production, it is possible to talk with other audience members or to make public comments. This is in keeping with the goal to allow audience interaction with the players similar to that of Shakespeare's time. Audio dialog is augmented by subtitling, which has been available in French, German, Spanish, Italian and Portuguese. The audience is asked to observe other guidelines related to the virtual environment, as described in the SL Shakespeare Company Audience Guide.

=== The Blackfriars Theater ===
The Blackfriars Theater in Second Life is one of two working models in Second Life. However this reconstruction is just one interpretation of the interior of the building, this reconstruction does not take into account the exterior of the building itself. Lora Constantine quotes “Blackfriars, as the name implies, has quite a lot to do with friars. In fact, the original playhouse was ‘built’ inside a building in a centuries-old stone friary… Nowadays, we would consider [the playhouse] just interior decoration or remodeling.”

== Production history ==
The company's first production was Hamlet, Act 1, Scene 1 in February 2008, which was followed by Act 3, Scene 2 in April. In June 2008 the company took a break from Hamlet and started to work on a staged reading (not performance) of Twelfth Night. On September 12, 2008, the company opened their first modern play, One’s a Pawn of Time by Mike Dedrian. The company then returned to Twelfth Night and staged the first act of the play starting in November, 2008. No full-length Shakespearean play has been produced due to funding issues.

In December 2008 the company developed Shakespeare on Ice as part of the Second Life: On Winter Solstice 2008. Shakespeare on Ice was a 24-hour ongoing festival which revived characters and plots from previous SL Shakespeare Company productions, with the aim to entertain and educate. In February 2009 the company started work on Twelfth Night, Act 1: The Open Ended Run, which premiered on March 1 and ran every Sunday and every Tuesday until the companies closure on October 29. Ina Centaur closed with this statement "The Shakespeare Primtings sLiterary and Skin City sims will go down on Oct 29 or thereabouts. The process in which sims are deactivated is not usually punctual – we aren’t sure exactly when the executioners would finally pull the plug, but when they do, it will be the end of our Second Life."

== Technology ==
The technological aspects of the play rely mainly on bot technology which could be categorised in two main groups i.e. Infobots that are based on archived data and Avabots characterised by some AI which real-time live input by actors. The Avabots are synched with the actors' gestures and animations according to their lines.

== Animation ==
Avatars in Second Life move from place-to-place in real time under human control, however body poses and facial expressions are limited to pre-defined animations and scripts. Metaverse Shakespeare Company productions augments this, including two ways: by creating new animations, and with post-production lip sync. In the Second Life virtual world, one has the ability to either watch events from a static position, or to move the view to a place that is away from one’s avatar. Thus, while in Second Life, the viewer can zoom, or choose any angle from which to watch the animations. This requires the representations of the stage actors to be viewable even at a close distance.

== Actors' bodies and costumes ==
The avatar character bodies for Hamlet were created to suit each character, while a wardrobe resembling historically correct clothing was purpose-built, or assembled from Second Life vendors. In Twelfth Night the emphasis on period clothing was relaxed.

== Budget ==
Much of the design and production work is volunteer. Other expenses for 2009 are L$1,510,000 (approximately US$5830), which is largely to pay Second Life for land sufficient to support large audiences.

=== Financial problems ===
In May, 2011, Ina Centaur shared her fear in an emotional blog post that two sims from the 4-Sim SL Globe Theatre would be deleted later on in the year and hence the theatre itself would go down as well. Her account in Second Life was already locked and though Primting and Shakespeare managed to cover their tier costs through donations, it was unlikely that The Globe Theatre would be saved.

In an adieu post, the Metaverse Shakespeare company announced that Shakespeare, Primtings, sLiterary and Skin City sims which would go down at the end 2011 due to high tier costs and insufficient fundings. Although the company tried to raise enough profit through various sponsorship campaigns, season ticket deals and tickets for opening night. Increase in revenue in SL as there are only few who pay entry fees for an attraction. Further, the post depicts reasons for Ina Centaur's decision to quit.

== See also ==
- Second Life Culture
- Shakespeare's Globe (A modern reconstruction of the historical Globe upon which the Second Life Globe is based.)
- Simulated reality
- Virtual world
- Metaverse
