= Kenji Nojima =

Japanese voice actor

- 野島 健児
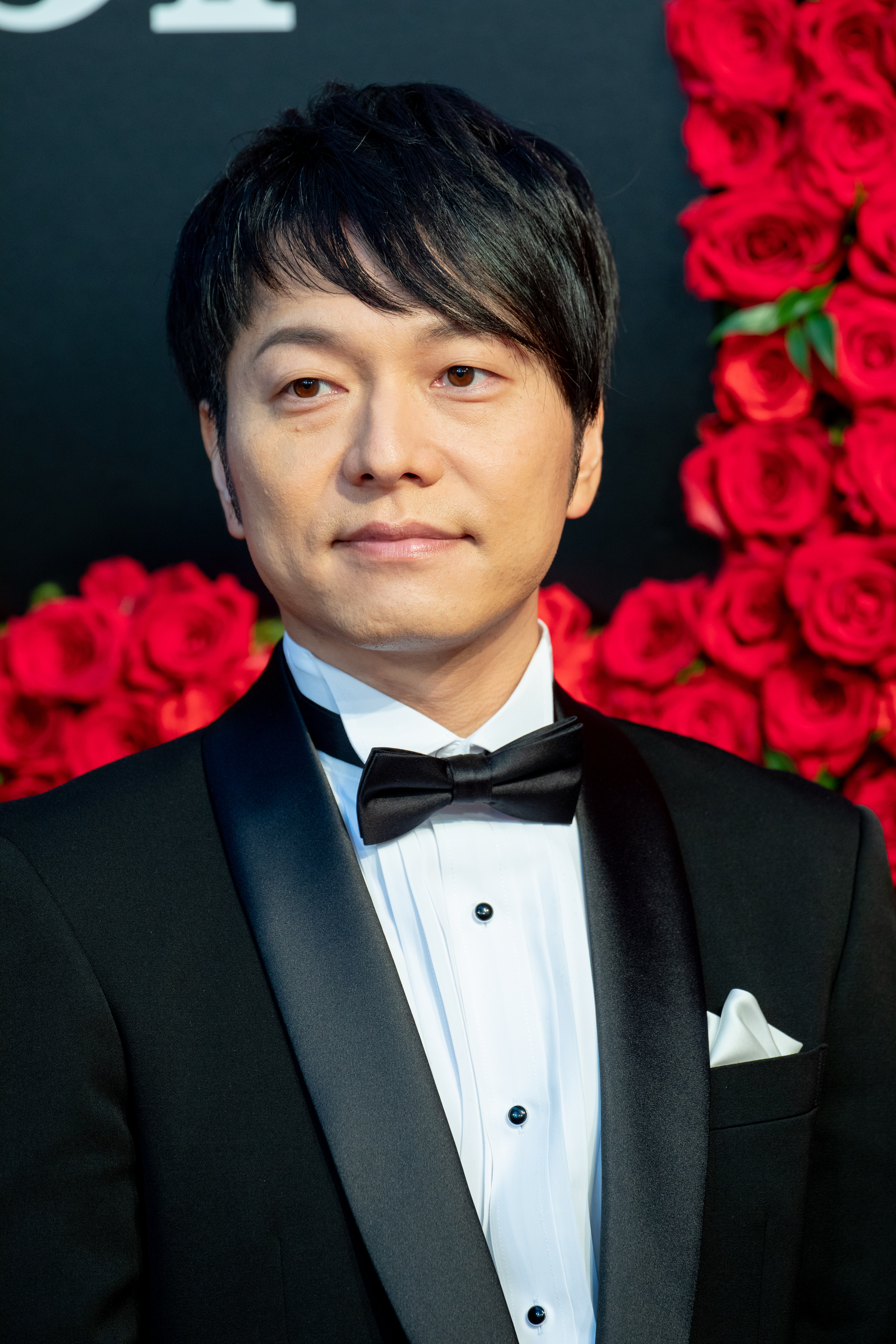
- Nojima at the 2018 Tokyo International Film Festival
- Born: March 16, 1976 (age 50); Tokyo, Japan
- Other name: Yuga Takane
- Occupations: Voice actor; singer
- Years active: 1996–present
- Agent: Aoni Production
- Notable work: Shakugan no Shana as Keisaku Satou; High School DxD as Yuto Kiba; Blood-C as Fumito Nanahara; Haikyuu!! To The Top as Shinsuke Kita; Yowamushi Pedal as Yukinari Kuroda; Sailor Moon Crystal as Mamoru Chiba/Tuxedo Mask; Dr. Stone: Science Future as Dr. Xeno Houston Wingfield
- Spouse: Chie Sawaguchi (m. 2004)
- Children: 2
- Father: Akio Nojima
- Relatives: Hirofumi Nojima (brother)

Kenji Nojima (野島 健児, Nojima Kenji; born March 16, 1976) is a Japanese voice actor and singer affiliated with the voice talent agency Aoni Production. His first major role in voice-over was Spark in the Record of Lodoss War: Chronicles of the Heroic Knight series. He voiced Hikaru Ichijyo in a number of Macross-related video games in the 2000s. Other major roles include Yuto Kiba in High School DxD, Jade in Ultimate Muscle, Nobuchika Ginoza in Psycho-Pass, Keisaku Sato in Shakugan no Shana, Taihei Doma in Himouto! Umaru-chan, Yuna Roma Seiran in Mobile Suit Gundam SEED Destiny, Hazard/Submarine Robo in Sortie! Machine Robo Rescue, Prince Cayenne in Lady Jewelpet, Mamoru Chiba/Tuxedo Mask in Sailor Moon Crystal, Fumito Nanahara in Blood-C, and Masaki in Time of Eve. He is the son of Akio Nojima and is the younger brother of Hirofumi Nojima. He married Chie Sawaguchi in 2004 and has two children. Their eldest son, Touya Nojima (野島透也, Nojima Tōya), started working as an actor and voice actor since 2020.

== Filmography ==
=== Anime ===
List of voice performances in anime
Year	Series	Role	Notes	Source
1997	Chūka Ichiban!	Guangzhou Dumpling Clerk	TV series	
1997	Chibi Maruko-chan	Hideaki Hiraoka	TV series	
1997	Vampire Princess Miyu	Phantom	TV series	
1998	Record of Lodoss War: Chronicles of the Heroic Knight	Spark	Debut role	
1998	Trigun	Richie		
1998	Fancy Lala	Emcee	Ep. 20	
1998	Sentimental Journey	Boy	Ep. 4, 6	
1998	Serial Experiments Lain	Boy		
1998	Sorcerous Stabber Orphen: Begins	Cox		
1998	Hanasaka Tenshi Tenten-kun ja:花さか天使テンテンくん	Torakichi Kikuzaki		
1998	Kindaichi Case Files	Junpei Ariyoshi	Ep. 69	
1999	Shin Hakkenden	Aniji		
1999	Jibaku-kun	Kazu		
1999	Blue Gender	Yuji Kaido		
1999	One Piece	Pell		
2000	Pilot Candidate	Erts Virny Cocteau		
2000	Gate Keepers	Commander (age 17)		
2000	Platinumhugen Ordian	Junya Namiki		
2000	Gear Fighter Dendoh	Susumu Kirakuni, Abzolute, Altair (young)		
2001	Sister Princess	Wataru Minakami		
2001	Galaxy Angel	Android Darling		
2001	Pachislo Kizoku Gin ja:パチスロ貴族 銀	Shunichi Oumi		
2001	Shingu: Secret of the Stellar Wars	Hajime Murata		
2001	Offside ja:オフサイド (漫画)	Wataru Arimoto		
2001	A Little Snow Fairy Sugar	Turmeric		
2001	Crush Gear Turbo	Yuuya Marino, Q		
2001	Rave Master	Sorashido Sharpener		
2002	Ultimate Muscle: The Kinnikuman Legacy	Jade		
2002	RahXephon	Torigai Mamoru		
2002	Genma Taisen	Loof		
2002	Tenchi Muyo! GXP	Kenneth Barr		
2002	The Twelve Kingdoms	Sekki 夕暉		
2002	Atashin'chi	Oyamada		
2002	Dragon Drive	Mahiru		
2002	Overman King Gainer	Gainer		
2002	Spiral	Kanone Hilbert		
2002	Pocket Monsters: Advanced Generation	Tetsuya		
2002	Weiß Kreuz Gluhen	Todou master		
2003	Machine Robo Rescue	Submarnine Robo, Colonel Hazard		
2003	Crush Gear Nitro	Yukihiko Asagi		
2003	Air Master	Kawahara		
2003	Di Gi Charat Nyo!	Yasushi Omocha		
2003	Croket!	Sherbet		
2003	Crayon Shin-chan	Kenta Musashino	TV series	
2003	Massugu ni iko ja:まっすぐにいこう。	Junichi Akiyoshi	TV series	
2003	F-Zero: GP Legend	Leon		
2003	Gilgamesh	Duo		
2003	Bobobo-bo Bo-bobo	Lieutenant		
2004	Sgt. Frog	Shigure		
2004	The Marshmallow Times	Lime		
2004	Phoenix	Takechi no Oji	Sun chapter	
2004	Ragnarok the Animation	Merchant		
2004	Ultimate Muscle	Jade		
2004	Rockman EXE Stream	Domon gai		
2004	Zoids: Fuzors	RD	broadcast in US first then Japan	
2004	BECK: Mongolian Chop Squad	Yoshiyuki Taira		
2004	Zipang	Kazuma Tsuda		
2004	Mobile Suit Gundam SEED Destiny	Yuna Roma Seiran, Bart Heim		
2004	Yakitate!! Japan	Takumi Tsubozuka		
2005	Sukisho!	Yoshihiro Hano		
2005	Milk Junkies / Boobalicious	Wataru	Adult OVA series, as Yuga Takane	
2005	Mushiking: King of the Beetles	Soma		
2005	Guyver: The Bioboosted Armor	Shō Fukamachi		
2005	Angel Heart	Qian De Li (teen)		
2005	Shakugan no Shana series	Keisaku Satou		
2005	Blood+	Karman		
2006	Ultimate Muscle 2	Jade		
2006	Crash B-Daman	Kinzou Ooguro, Teruma Kamioka		
2006	Madan Senki Ryukendo	Gekiryuuken		
2006	Futari wa Precure Splash Star	Kazuya Misho		
2006	Air Gear	Akira Udō		
2006	Shibawanko no Wa no Kokoro ja:しばわんこの和のこころ	Part-time job boy		
2006	Princess Princess	Shunkai Sakamoto		
2006	Ray the Animation	Takuma		
2006	Yume Tsukai	Keigo Sakaki		
2006	Honey and Clover II	Yūta Takemoto	Ep. 12	
2006	Otogi-Jūshi Akazukin	Hameln		
2006	Innocent Venus	Jō Katsuragi		
2006	Marginal Prince	Henri-Hugues de Saint Germain		
2006	La Corda d'Oro: Primo Passo	Student		
2006	Ghost Hunt	Akifumi Yoshimi		
2006	Kanon	Kuze		
2006	Underbar Summer	Osamu Funade	OVA	
2007	Tōka Gettan	Haruhiko Kamiazuma, Yafutsu king		
2007	Over Drive	Kôichi Terao		
2007	Kōtetsu Sangokushi	Lu Su		
2007	Bokurano	Kanji Yoshikawa		
2007	Zero Duel Masters	Ogre		
2007	Bamboo Blade	Ano Kiyomura		
2007	Duel Masters Zero	Ogre		
2008	Amatsuki	Heihachi		
2008	Kirarin Revolution Stage-3	Nanao-san		
2008	Monochrome Factor	Masaki Kiritachi		
2008	Scarecrowman the Animation ja:スケアクロウマン	Stein (young)		
2008	Ryoko's Case File	Akira Kishimoto		
2008	Zero no Tsukaima: Princesse no Rondo	Bidashal Vitartial		
2008	Sands of Destruction	Eoru		
2008	Battle Spirits: Shounen Toppa Bashin	J Modoki		
2008	Hell Girl: Three Vessels	Masato Shirota		
2009	Natsume's Book of Friends	Yasaka		
2009	Gokujō!! Mecha Mote Iinchō	Suzuki-sensei		
2009	Cross Game	Keitaro Mishima		
2009	Fullmetal Alchemist: Brotherhood	Slicer (Number 48, Younger Brother)		
2009	Tatakau Shisho: The Book of Bantorra	Winkeny Bizee		
2009	Anyamaru Tantei Kiruminzuu	Pulse Ryūdō		
2009	Kobato	Katsuragi		
2009	Psychiatrist Irabu series	Naoya		
2010	Maid Sama!	Kuuga Sakurai		
2010	Ring ni Kakero 1	Kuroyasha		
2010	Highschool of the Dead	Alice Maresato's father		
2010	Bakuman	Hayato		
2010	A Certain Magical Index II	GROUP Telephone Voice		
2011	Gosick	Ned		
2011	Cardfight!! Vanguard	Jun Mutsuki		
2011	Sket Dance	Michiru Shinba		
2011	Aria the Scarlet Ammo	Tohru "Vlad" Sayonaki		
2011	Nura: Rise of the Yokai Clan: Demon Capital	Mamiru Keikain		
2011	Blood-C	Fumito Nanahara		
2011	The Mystic Archives of Dantalian	Granville brother		
2012	High School DxD series	Yuto Kiba		
2012	The Familiar of Zero F	Bidashal Vitartial		
2012	Lagrange: The Flower of Rin-ne series	Kirius	2 TV series and OVA	
2012	Tanken Driland	Warence		
2012	Tamagotchi!	Wagashitechi		
2012	Psycho-Pass	Nobuchika Ginoza		
2013	Beast Saga	Oulumaiti		
2013	Tanken Driland: Sennen no Mahō	Warence, Magare Kisuikyo		
2013	Aikatsu!	Rei Kamishiro	TV 2nd series	
2013	Freezing Vibration	Louis el Bridget		
2014	Hamatora: The Animation	Shiuchi Hiiragi		
2014	Lady Jewelpet	Prince Cayenne		
2014	Yu-Gi-Oh! Arc-V	Isao Kachidoki		
2014	Hero Bank	Kasumi Jokan		
2014	Pretty Guardian Sailor Moon Crystal Season I	Mamoru Chiba/Tuxedo Mask	ONA, Dark Kingdom arc	
2014	Psycho-Pass 2	Nobuchika Ginoza		
2014	New Prince of Tennis	Jusaburō Mōri	OVA	
2015	Rin-ne	Kimura-senpai		
2015	Pretty Guardian Sailor Moon Crystal Season II	Mamoru Chiba/Tuxedo Mask		ONA, Black Moon arc
2015	Ghost in the Shell: Arise – Alternative Architecture	Tsumugi		
2015	Rakudai Kishi no Cavalry	Bishou		
2015	Triage X	Kyōji Tobishiro		
2015	Himouto! Umaru-chan	Taihei Doma		
2016	Osomatsu-san	Kamimatsu	Episode 21	
2016	Yuri!!! on Ice	Lee Seung-gil		
2016	Pretty Guardian Sailor Moon Crystal Season III	Mamoru Chiba/Tuxedo Mask	TV Anime, Death Busters arc	
2016	Saiki Kusuo no Psi-nan	Kūsuke Saiki		
2017	Scum's Wish	Narumi Kanai		
2017	Kekkai Sensen & Beyond	Liir		
2018	Banana Fish	Eiji Okumura		
2018	Free! Dive to the Future	Natsuya Kirishima		
2018	Food Wars! Shokugeki no Soma: The Third Plate	Charme		
2019	Kemurikusa	Wakaba		
2019	7 Seeds	Fubuki Samejima		
2019	Ensemble Stars!	Natsume Sakasaki		
2019	JoJo's Bizarre Adventure: Golden Wind	Scolippi		
2019	Actors: Songs Connection	Mitsuki Akika		
2020	Haikyuu!!: To The Top	Kita Shinsuke		
2021	Skate-Leading Stars	Susumu Ishikawa		
2021	Moriarty the Patriot	Charles Augustus Milverton		
2021	How a Realist Hero Rebuilt the Kingdom	Julius Amidonia		
2021	Kageki Shojo!!	Taichi Narata		
2021	Resident Evil: Infinite Darkness	Patrick	ONA	
2021	Baki Hanma	Jun Guevara	ONA	
2022	VazzRock the Animation	Kōdai Ejima		
2023	Technoroid Overmind	Nobel		
2024	Shangri-La Frontier	Sakai Tsukuyogi		
2024	That Time I Got Reincarnated as a Slime	Renard (Leonard)		
2024	The Grimm Variations	Wilhelm Grimm	ONA	
2024	Kinnikuman: Perfect Origin Arc	Turbomen		
2024	Mission: Yozakura Family	Mizuki		
2025	Dr. Stone: Science Future	Dr. Xeno Houston Wingfield		

=== Films ===
List of voice performances in anime feature films
Year	Series	Role	Notes	Source
2003	Pocket Monsters Advanced Generation the Movie – Wishing Star of the Seven Nights: Jirachi	Butler (young)		
2003	Atashin'chi	Tsukioka (young)		
2004	Pocket Monsters Advanced Generation the Movie – Sky-Splitting Visitor: Deoxys	Ryu, Deoxys B		
2007	One Piece Movie: The Desert Princess and the Pirates: Adventures in Alabasta	Pell		
2008	Major: Yūjō no Winning Shot	Masato Koga		
2009	Space Battleship Yamato: Resurrection	Yoichi Sakurai		
2010	Time of Eve: The Movie	Masakazu Masaki		
2012	Blood-C: The Last Dark	Fumito Nanahara		
2013	Ghost in the Shell: Arise	Tsumugi	Film series	
2014	Saint Seiya: Legend of Sanctuary	Phoenix Ikki		
2015	Psycho-Pass: The Movie	Nobuchika Ginoza		
2015	Doukyusei: Classmates	Rihito Sajou		
2015	Ghost in the Shell: The Movie	Tsumugi		
2015	High Speed! Free! Starting Days	Natsuya Kirishima		
2021	Pretty Guardian Sailor Moon Eternal The Movie	Mamoru Chiba/Tuxedo Mask	2-Part Film, Season 4 of Sailor Moon Crystal (Dead Moon arc)	
2023	Pretty Guardian Sailor Moon Cosmos The Movie	Mamoru Chiba/Tuxedo Mask	2-Part Film, Season 5 of Sailor Moon Crystal (Shadow Galactica arc)	

=== Video games ===
List of voice performances in video games
Year	Series	Role	Notes	Source
1996	Lup Salad: Lupupu Cube	Female Weather Reporter	PS	
1997	Dynasty Warriors series	Lu Xun		
1997	Dark Hunter: Jou Ijigen Gakuen	Tsubasa Mashita	PS1/PS2	
1997	ja:毛利元就 誓いの三矢	Takakage Kobayakawa, Shikanosuke Yamanaka	PC	
1997	Dark Hunter: Shita Youma no Mori	Tsubasa Mashita	PS1/PS2	
1997	Marica: Shinjitsu no Sekai	Third Shinjitsu no Hito		
1997	Langrisser IV	Admiral Wheeler	Sega Saturn	
1997	ja:桃太郎道中記	Kagoya, Okappiki	Sega Saturn	
1997	Hop Step Idol	Joji Iwasaki	Sega Saturn	
1997	Oh My Goddess!	Hercules		
1998	Kendo Rage Z	Masakka		
1998	Makeruna Makendou Z [PC-FX]	Masakker		
1998	Tokimeki Memorial Drama Series Vol. 2: Irodori no Love Song ja:ときめきメモリアルドラマシリーズ	Manager	PS1/PS2	
1998	Toshinden Card Quest	Abel	PS1/PS2	
1998	Baroque	Boy		
1998	Langrisser V: The End of Legend	Wheeler	Sega Saturn	
1998	Sotsugyou M: Male Graduation – Seitokai Naga no Kareinaru Inbou 卒業M～生徒会長の華麗なる陰謀～	Aoi Soryo	PS1/PS2	
1998	Nijiiro Twinkle: Guruguru Dai-sakusen	Sousei		
1998	Hoshi no Oka Gakuen Monogatari: Gakuensai ja:星の丘学園物語 学園祭	Naoki Hashimoto	PS1/PS2	
1999	Langrisser IV & V: Final Edition	Wheeler	PS1/PS2	
1999	Gakuen Sentai Solblast	Atsuya Kaidai	PS1/PS2	
1999	Tokimeki Memorial Drama Series Vol. 3: Tabidachi no Uta	Theater Director	PS1/PS2	
1999	Zeus II Carnage Heart	Tom Bombajiru	PS1/PS2	
1999	Growlanser I	Ralph	PS1/PS2	
1999	Tokimeki Memorial 2	Junichiro Hokari	PS1/PS2	
2000	Super Robot Wars Alpha	Hikaru Ichijyo	PS1/PS2	
2000	Tokimeki Memorial 2 Substories: Dancing Summer Vacation	Junichiro Hokari	PS1/PS2	
2000	Blood: The Last Vampire	Hero	PS1/PS2	
2001	Shadow Hearts	Keith Valentine	PC Adult game	
2001	Summon Night 2	Rocca	PS1/PS2	
2001	Digital Holmes	Al Watson	PS1/PS2	
2002	Yakitori Musume: Sugo Ude Hanjouki ja:やきとり娘〜スゴ腕繁盛記〜	Masaharu	PS1/PS2	
2002	Crush Gear Turbo	Yuya Shinrino	PS1/PS2	
2002	Groove Adventure Rave: Mikan No Hiseki	Solasido Sharpner	PS1/PS2	
2002	Innocent Tears	Kagura Haruaki	Xbox	
2002	Moeyo Ken	Shintaro Yuzuki	PS1/PS2	
2002	Melty Blood	Shiki Tohno, Shiki Nanaya	PC	
2003	Arc the Lad: Twilight of the Spirits	Kharg, Mereoru Nīderia	PS1/PS2	
2003	Maple Colors	Atsushi Kojima ghost, Noppo, Chibi, Theatre Staff A, 3 Grade A, Men's A	PC Adult game as Yuga Takane	
2003	Summon Night 3	Rocca	PS1/PS2	
2003	Zoids VS II	Shoma Subaru		
2003	The Super Dimension Fortress Macross	Hikaru Ichijyo	PS1/PS2	
2003	DreamMix TV World Fighters	Microman		
2004	好きなものは好きだからしょうがない！！ -FIRST LIMIT&TARGET†NIGHTS- Sukisyo！ Episode #01+#02	Yoshihiro Hano	PS1/PS2	
2004	Galactic Wrestling: Featuring Ultimate Muscle	Jade, Dazzle	PS1/PS2	
2004	Shinten Makai Generation of Chaos IV	Verres Faburoso	PS1/PS2	
2004	Juuni Kokuki: Kakukakutaru Oudou, Kouryoku no Uka ja:十二国記 -赫々たる王道 紅緑の羽化-	Yuki	PS1/PS2	
2004	Shin Megami Tensei: Digital Devil Saga	Serph	PS2	
2004	Rashiel no Hakoniwa: Shounen to Kaihou no Jumon	Takami Kujo	PC Adult game	
2004	Jackin	Kai	PC Adult game	
2004	Love Songs: ADV Futaba Riho 14-sai Natsu	Takashi Naruse	PS1/PS2	
2004	Zoids VS III	RD, Shoma Subaru		
2004	Ace Combat 5: The Unsung War	Hans Grimm	PS1/PS2	
2004	好きなものは好きだからしょうがない！！ -RAIN- Sukisyo！ Episode #03	Yoshihiro Hano	PS1/PS2	
2004	Shining Tears	Cupid	PS1/PS2	
2004	Love Songs: ADV Futaba Riho 19-sai Fuyu	Takashi	PS1/PS2	
2004	Korokke! Gurēto jikū no bōken-sha	Sherbet		
2005	Heartner Hearts	Reiichi Kagami	PC Adult game	
2005	Pure Pure Mimi to Shippo no Monogatari	Takuya Midou	PS1/PS2	
2005	Shin Megami Tensei: Digital Devil Saga 2	Serph, Serph Sheffield	PS2	
2005	Star Fox: Assault	Fox McCloud		
2005	Makai Kingdom: Chronicles of the Sacred Tome	Alexander the God of Destruction	PS1/PS2	
2005	Maple Colors: Kessen ha Gakuen Matsuri!	Atsushi Kojima ghost, Chibi, Noppo	As Yuga Takane	
2005	Soshite Bokura wa, and he said...	Ryo Akai	PS1/PS2	
2005	Stamp Out	Masa Enomoto	PC Adult game	
2005	Sudeki	Nash		
2005	Underbar Summer	Osamu Funade	As Yuga Takane	
2005	Shadow of the Colossus	Wander	PS1/PS2	
2005	Sakigake!! Otokojuku	Hakuotori	PS1/PS2	
2005	Korokke! DS Tenku no Yushatachi	Sherbet	DS	
2006	Otometeki Koi Kakumei Love Revo!!	Touru Kinomura	PS1/PS2	
2006	Shakugan no Shana	Keisaku Sato	PS1/PS2	
2006	Another Century's Episode 2	Hikaru Ichijyo	PS1/PS2	
2006	Tokimeki Memorial Girl's Side: 2nd Kiss	Kazuyuki Akagi	PS1/PS2	
2006	Melty Blood: Act Cadenza	Shiki Tohno		
2006	Simple 2000 Series Vol. 104: The Robot Tsukurouze! – Gekitou! Robot Fight	Jun Nishina	PS1/PS2	
2006	SpellDown	Masato Jojima	PC Adult game	
2006	Unlimited Mahjongg Works	Shiro	PC Adult game	
2006	Kaze no Satsui: It's a long way round 風の殺意- It's a long way round -	Kazuya Miyahara	PC Adult game	
2006	JoJo's Bizarre Adventure: Phantom Blood	Dio Brando (young)	PS1/PS2	
2006	Mobile Suit Gundam Seed Destiny: Rengou vs. Z.A.F.T. II	Yuna Roma Seiran	PS2	
2006	Himehibi: Princess Days	Yamato Takashiro	PS1/PS2	
2006	Yakuza 2	Kazuma Kiryu (Child）	PS2	
2007	Warriors Orochi series	Lu Xun		
2007	Panic Palette	Osamu Kikichuba (rīdi vu~oruparu 7-sei)	PS1/PS2	
2007	Hisui no Shizuku: Hiiro no Kakera 2	Akira Shigemori	PS1/PS2	
2007	Another Century's Episode 3: The Final	Hikaru Ichijyo	PS1/PS2	
2008	Super Smash Bros. Brawl	Fox McCloud	Wii	
2008	Last Escort 2: Shinya no Amai Toge	Makoto	PS2	
2008	Lux-Pain	Hibiki Kiryu	DS	
2008	Warriors Orochi 2	Lu Xun	PS1/PS2	
2008	Valkyria Chronicles	Kreis Czherny	PS3	
2008	Panic Palette Portable	Osamu Kikichuba (rīdi vu~oruparu 7-sei)	PSP	
2008	Zwei: The Ilvard Insurrection	Ragna Valentine	Windows	
2008	Macross Ace Frontier	Hikaru Ichijyo	PSP	
2008	The Last Remnant	Rush Sykes	Xbox 360	
2009	Tales of the World: Radiant Mythology 2	Guede	PSP	
2009	VitaminZ	Nachi Hojo	PS1/PS2	
2009	Growlanser I	Ralph	PSP Remake	
2009	Tales of Vesperia	Alexander von Cumoure	PS3	
2009	Macross Ultimate Frontier ja:マクロスアルティメットフロンティア	Hikaru Ichijyo	PSP	
2009	Shin Hisui no Shizuku: Hiiro no Kakera 2	Akira Shigemori	PS1/PS2	
2009	NadePro!! Kisama no Seiyuu Yatte Miro!	Kenta Nagumo	PS1/PS2	
2009	War Budokai	Touji Shindou	Wii	
2009	Bleach: The 3rd Phantom	Fujimaru Kudo		
2010	Otometeki Koi Kakumei★Love Revo!! Portable	Touru Kinomura	PSP	
2010	ja:Angelic Crest	Player character (male)	PC	
2010	Tokimeki Memorial Girl's Side: 3rd Story	Kazuyuki Akagi	DS	
2010	Shin Hisui no Shizuku: Hiiro no Kakera 2 Portable	Akira Shigemori	PSP	
2010	Nessa no Rakuen	Ashraf Rasudi	PC Adult game as Yuga Takane	
2010	Trinity: Souls of Zill O'll	Tsuerasheru	PS3	
2010	Ishin renge ryūma gaiden 維新恋華 龍馬外伝	Gensai Kawakami	PSP	
2011	Macross Triangle Frontier	Hikaru Ichijyo	PSP	
2011	Tales of the World: Radiant Mythology 3	Guede	PSP	
2011	Black Robinia	Tsukihiko Kagurazaka	PSP	
2011	Shin Hisui no Shizuku: Hiiro no Kakera 2 DS	Akira Shigemori	DS	
2012	Tales of Innocence R	Kongwai Tao		
2012	Kurohyou 2 ryūgagotoku ashura-hen クロヒョウ2 龍が如く 阿修羅編	Tamotsu Saito	PSP	
2012	Atelier Ayesha: The Alchemist of Dusk	Kyle Tarenbato	PS3	
2012	Rinne no Lagrange: Kamogawa Days	Kirisu	PS3	
2012	Unchained Blades Exiv	Zodiasu		
2012	School Wars	Masafumi Hisa	PSP	
2013	Otometeki Koi Kakumei★Love Revo!! 100kg Kara Hajimaru → Koi Monogatari -	Touru Kinomura	PSP	
2013	VitaminZ Graduation	Nachi Hojo	PSP	
2013	Shining Ark	Hiram	PSP	
2013	Geten no Hana	Mitsuhide Akechi	PSP	
2013	Detective Conan: Marionette Symphony	Tatsuya Kasukabe	DS	
2013	Toukiden: The Age of Demons	Ibuki		
2013	School Wars: Sotsugyou Sensen	Masafumi Hisa	PSP	
2013	High School DxD	Yuto Kiba	DS	
2014	Otomate	Yasuna Saeki	PSP	
2014	Geten no Hana: Yume Akari	Mitsuhide Akechi	PSP	
2014	Iza, shutsujin! Rensen dainimaku: Echigo-hen いざ、出陣！恋戦 第二幕 ～越後編～	Sadamitsu Usami	PSP	
2014	Mobile Suit Gundam Side Story: Missing Link	Fred Lieber		
2014	CV: Casting Voice	Daisuke Nakamikado	PS3	
2014	Black Code	Jiru Gabriela	PSP	
2014	Sailor Moon Crystal	Tuxedo Mask		
2014	Gakuen Heaven 2: Double Scramble	Arata Minase	PC	
2014	Toukiden:Kiwami	Ibuki		
2014	Kamisama to Unmei Kakumei no Cross Thesis 神様と運命覚醒のクロステーゼ	Shin Kamikaze	PS3, replaces Junichi Miyake	
2014	Nekketsu Inou Bukatsu: Trigger Kiss	Yamato Subaru		
2014	Mermaid Gothic	Gawain Rights	PSP	
2014	Granblue Fantasy	Lobelia	PC, Mobile	
2014	Super Smash Bros. for Nintendo 3DS and Wii U	Fox McCloud	Wii U	
2015	Sailor Moon Crystal: Black Moon Hen	Tuxedo Mask		
2015	Yowamushi Pedal: Ashita e no High Cadence	Yukinari Kuroda	DS	
2015	Otoko Yukaku	Kagero		
2015	Saint Seiya: Soul of Gold	Garumu no ūtogaruza		
2016	Ensemble Stars!	Natsume Sakasaki		
2017	Tales of the Rays	Kong-wei Tao		
2020	Genshin Impact	Albedo		
2021	Live A Hero	Monomasa Osato	Mobile	
2022	Eve: Ghost Enemies	Shuuji Toukairin	PS4/Switch	

=== Dubbing roles ===
List of dub performances of overseas productions
Series	Role	Voice dub for / Notes	Source
Agora Hills	Davus	Max Minghella	
Alexandria	Daosu		
Aliens vs. Predator: Requiem	Ricky Howard	Johnny Lewis	
Alpha Dog	Johnny Truelove	Emile Hirsch	
American Made	Monty Schafer	Domhnall Gleeson	
Diary of a Wimpy Kid	Rodrick Heffley	Devon Bostick	
Diary of a Wimpy Kid: Rodrick Rules	Rodrick Heffley	Devon Bostick	
Drop Dead Diva	Fred	Ben Feldman	
The Favourite	Robert Harley	Nicholas Hoult	
Fired Up!	Shawn Colfax	Nicholas D'Agosto	
The Haunting in Connecticut	Matthew Campbell	Kyle Gallner	
Initial D	Takumi Fujiwara	Jay Chou	
The Invisible	Nicholas "Nick" Powell	Justin Chatwin	
Journey to the West: The Demons Strike Back	Zhu Bajie	Yang Yiwei	
Kung Fu Dunk	Fang Shi-jie	Jay Chou	
Lords of Dogtown	Stacy Peralta	John Robinson	
Monsters: Dark Continent	Michael Parkes	Sam Keeley	
Moonlight Mile	Joe Nast	Jake Gyllenhaal	
My Little Pony: Equestria Girls	Flash Sentry	Vincent Tong	-->
My Little Pony: Equestria Girls – Rainbow Rocks	Flash Sentry	Vincent Tong	-->
Percy Jackson & the Olympians: The Lightning Thief	Luke Castellan	Jake Abel	
Percy Jackson: Sea of Monsters	Luke Castellan	Jake Abel	
Project Runway	Christian Siriano		
Rabbit Hole	Jason	Miles Teller	
Scott Pilgrim vs. the World	Wallace Wells	Kieran Culkin	
Smallville	Clark Kent	Tom Welling	
The Star	Bo	Steven Yeun / Animation	
Star Wars Rebels	Ezra Bridger	Taylor Gray / Animation	
The Thieves	Zanpano	Kim Soo-hyun	
Zentrix	Dark Alpha	Hong Kong produced series	

=== Audio drama ===
List of voice performances in audio dramas
Series	Role	Notes	Source
Maid Sama! series	Kuuga	Drama and talk CDs	
Persona3 Character Drama CD vol 2	Kenji Tomochika	Talk CD	
Clannad series	Tomoya Okazaki	Drama CD	
Di Gi Charat Nyo!		Drama CD	
Aoyama Nichoume Gekijou	Enomoto Kouichi	Radio	
Cobalt Tokimeki Drama CD Remix	?	Drama CD	
D-Xhird	Lucifer	Drama CD	
Dark Hunter: Ijigen Gakuen	?	Drama CD	
Dear Gentle Papa	Haruhiko Oka	Drama CD	
No Touching At All どうしても触れたくない	Toshiaki Shima	Drama CD	
Escort エスコート	Yukari Asou	Drama CD	
Gaya Gaya Party -Mobile Animate, 2000.04-	personality	radio	
Hanageki	Hiroshi Uitani	Drama CD	
Hisoya ka na binetsu ひそやかな微熱	Kei Mizuhashi	Drama CD	
Infantaria	Lankard	Drama CD	
Ishi no kimochi 石のキモチ	Tetsuya Morishita	Radio	
Kachō no koi 課長の恋	Ryu Harada	Drama CD	
Kazegatsuyokufuiteiru 風が強く吹いている	Haiji Kiyose	Radio	
Kioku kanran-sha 記憶観覧者	Koichi Enomoto	Radio	
Kodakara Chitose no Wedding Fairu 子宝千歳のウエディングファイル	Takejiro Ichikawa	Radio	
Koi! Koko zo to iu toki こい！ここぞというとき	Tama Gyaku	Radio	
Kono tsumibukaki yoru ni この罪深き夜に	Kazutaka Seikanji	Drama CD	
Mahou Gakuen Lunar		Talk CD	
Majima-kun Suttobasu		Talk CD	
Manga no Genba	Narrator	narration	
Mr. Perfect Lady	Yuta	Radio	
My Angel		Talk CD	
Nejireta eddji ねじれたEDGE	Akihiko Sakisaka	Drama CD	
Night on the Galactic Railroad	Narrator	Drama CD	
One: kagayakukisetsuhe: nagamori mizuka sutōrī `anata no kokoro o watashi no naka e' ONE～輝く季節へ～ 長森瑞佳ストーリー「あなたのこころを わたしのなかへ」	Kohei Orihara	Drama CD	
One: Kagayakukisetsuhe: kawana misaki sutōrī `aka reta tobira One: 輝く季節へ～ 川名みさきストーリー「開かれた扉」	Kohei Orihara	Drama CD	
One: Kagayakukisetsuhe: satomura akane sutōrī `tai setsunaba sho' ONE～輝く季節へ～ 里村茜ストーリー「たいせつなばしょ」	Kohei Orihara	Drama CD	
Reunion (2009 edition)	Satofumi	Radio	
Seigi no "mi" hō 正義の『見』方	Masayoshi	Radio	
Sentimental Graffiti: Ano Hi no Mama no Kimi de Ite	Matsuoka Shingo	Drama CD	
Shinshi dōmei† 紳士同盟†	Makuri Tsujimiya	Drama CD	
Sotsugyou M+ (Male Graduation Plus) Final Drama CD: Oretachi no Sotsugyou	?	Drama CD	
Splendide Shana Vol 1		Talk CD	
Splendide Shana Vol 2		Talk CD	
Suzunooto ga kikoeru 鈴の音がきこえる	Jun Kirishima	Drama CD	
Unmei to iu yatsu 運命というやつ	Koji	Radio	
Voice Theater Series 3 Niji wo Wataru Neko		Talk CD	
W (Double) Juliet HCD		Talk CD	
W (Double) Juliet HCD Stage II		Talk CD	
Wagamamadakedoitoshikute ワガママだけど愛しくて	Adachi Yuki Osamu	Drama CD	
Yasha	Nagae Toichi	Talk CD	

=== Live-action film ===
Year	Series	Role	Notes	Source
2026	Bayside Shakedown N.E.W.	Director-General of the Commissioner-General's Secretariat		
