= Tokimeki Memorial Online =

2006 video game

- Developer(s): Konami
- Publisher(s): Konami
- Series: Tokimeki Memorial
- Platform(s): Windows
- Release: JP: March 2006
- Genre(s): MMO dating sim
- Mode(s): Multiplayer

Screenshot of the communication area of Tokimeki Memorial Online.

Tokimeki Memorial Online (ときめきメモリアルONLINE)^{[a]} was a massively multiplayer online (MMO) video game in the Tokimeki Memorial series.

No game in the series has ever been translated or officially released in the West, though they were purchased from import game stores. In the case of Tokimeki Memorial Online (TMO), the basic version was a free download.

To play TMO, one could set up a free Konami ID and buy an account key from Konami with Japan-issued credit card or WebMoney; it was possible for people outside Japan to buy WebMoney via e-currency exchange between e-currencies such as PayPal, e-Gold, and WebMoney.

The PC servers for the game were shut down on July 31, 2007.

The anime Tokimeki Memorial Only Love is based on Tokimeki Memorial Online.

== Development ==
Production of the game was first announced with the official site's opening in February 2005. The first beta testers were acquired during August of the same year.

== Marketing ==
To help market the game, Konami built a Tokimeki Internet cafe in the Harajuku area of Tokyo, Japan made to look like a classroom from the game.

== Characters ==
- Sayuri Amamiya (天宮 小百合) Voiced by: Yuki Makishima
- Haru Sakurai (桜井 晴) Voiced by: Ryohei Nakao
- Tsukasa Kasuga (春日 つかさ) Voiced by: Yukako Yoshikawa
- Mina Yayoi (弥生 水奈) Voiced by: Saki Fujita
- Kōya Inukai (犬飼 洸也) Voiced by: Hiroki Takahashi

== Notes ==
a : The game is also referred to as TokiMemo Online (ときメモONLINE), MemoOn (メモオン or メモon), TokiOn (ときON), Tokimeki OL (ときめきOL), and TMO.
