= True Love (video game) =

1995 video game

- Japanese cover art
- Developer: Software House Parsley
- Publishers: EU: Otaku Publishing; NA: FAKKU
- Artist: TD-X
- Platforms: NEC PC-9801; Microsoft Windows
- Release: NEC PC-9801: JP: June 9, 1995; PC-98 CD-ROM: JP: June 14, 1995; Microsoft Windows: JP: December 6, 1996; EU: October 1998; NA: January 1999
- Genre: Dating sim
- Mode: Single-player

True Love (Note: Japanese: True Love ～純愛物語～, Hepburn: lit. True Love: A Pure Love Story) is a Japanese adult dating simulation game developed by Software House Parsley. It was the 14th game by the company and was released on June 9, 1995, for the PC-98 and on December 6, 1996, for Windows 95-based computers.

The game involves the player taking control of Daisuke, a 19-year-old student who has three months to plan for his career while actively looking for a girlfriend. After meeting the girls, the player makes choices and then follows linear paths for different narrative paths to happen with the people he attempts to date.

It was published for English-language audiences in the late 1990s with a script that gave the game a less serious more tongue-in-cheek tone. While not released to great claim or fandom in Japan, it was one of the earliest dating sims from Japan to be released to Western audiences in English. The game also features one of the earliest examples of a bisexual character in a video game with the main character of Daisuke.

== Gameplay ==
Gameplay in True Love. As a bishōjo game the game features girls in an anime art style. The game screen shows dialogue at the bottom and player's stats on the right.

True Love has been described as Japanese adult bishōjo dating sim game. In dating sims, the player is in the role of a student and follows their process of getting to know women of the same age by spending certain periods of time in the game. The character also experiences various events that occur as a result of the daily choices he or she makes. The bishojo description is a sub-genre of the dating sim, that describes a game where that the playable male character interacts with attractive anime-styled girls.

The game plays on a day-by-day basis where the player has to schedule out the day as the male student Daisuke. Each day, three action slots are required to be filled out. During school days, the day time slot will be College with no choice of skipping school. The other options to fill in the schedule include options like studying, practicing art, exercising, and grooming. All these choices affect Daisuke's stats. Choosing some options effect other statuses, such as choosing sports will increase your appearance and physical condition, but affect your fatigue and scholarship negatively. If the fatigue status becomes too high, this leads to Daisuke fainting and losing several days of potential stat building.

Among the girls he meets are girls with different preferences for certain status such as Remi Himekawa whose preference is intelligence or Misako Sayama who has a preference for good physical condition level. Money can also be collected in a game from choosing to spend time at work, which allows the player to purchase stat improving items or special items to further storylines.

== Plot ==
The game is played through a series of virtual days, consecutively spanning three months. The main character Daisuke is a single, nineteen-year-old Japanese college senior living in the fictional Japanese city of Meiai. He is trying to find what direction to take his life in his studies while also actively looking for a girlfriend. He meets the cast of girls is introduced over the first few days in the game.

The player can choose various storylines each with a liner set path told through text and illustrations on the screen. Certain events are triggered if Daisuke is at certain locations at the correct time. This leads to preset events that vary from slapstick comedy, to suspenseful and supernatural story paths. Events are often laced with sexual innuendo with sex with a fellow university member only becoming a factor towards the end of the game.

== Background and development ==
In the 1980s, some manga artists such as Masako Watanabe and Toshio Maeda found ways to deal with rules regarding pornography in Japan and created more explicit works described as hentai. The rise of these designs and the close relationships between manga, anime, and video games led the visual novel genre to have hentai as its driving force. True Love follows this format, being described as an adult bishoujo dating sim game.

The game was developed by Software House Parsley who started developing games for the PC-98 in 1989. The game was the company's 14th release. The character design and illustrations were created by an artists known as TD-X, who was an employee of Parsley since their beginning.

The original Japanese script and structure was described by Sorlie as being light-hearted. The English translation changes the tone to make nearly all situations more tongue-in-cheek and far less serious.

== Release and reception ==
True Love was first released in Japan on Floppy disk on June 9, 1995, and then on June 14 on compact disc for the PC-98 home computer line. Next year, it was released on CD for Windows 95-based computers on December 6.

During the 90s, independent publishers began localizing and releasing Japanese adult games. JAST USA, one of the first companies to publish and port Japanese visual novel and dating sims games in the West, distributed True Love. It was released to North American audiences in January 1999 for Windows 95. In the United Kingdom, it was published by Otaku Publishing.

Throughout the 2000s, True Love was frequently pirated, partially as the Japanese developer, publisher and English publisher went out of business. The game was available through The Asenheim Project, which hosted dozens of 90s and early 2000s visual novels that were described as abandonware.

In August 2019, Fakku announced it would re-release True Love as True Love '95. Fakku's founder Jacob Grady said that that getting the license to redistribute the game was difficult, as all of the Japanese companies involved in the game had long been out of business, making them having to trace the rights holder through various different parties. Over twenty years later, the game was released to Steam in 2019.

Aulin Sorlie of Hardcore Gaming 101 described the games reception in Japan as being seen as "nothing more than a Tokimeki Memorial spoof" and that the game went relatively unnoticed in the Japanese market. Sorlie found the game suffering from low production values with character illustrations looking "crude and disproportionate" as well as having low quality music and being ridden-by bugs that effect the ability to appropriately save the players progress in the Windows version. Sorlie said the writing in the English-version of the game made it stand out as the game "managed to showcase fully functional storylines from start to finish which featured sex."

== Legacy ==
While dating sims reached a level of popularity and more wide audiences in Japan with games like Dōkyūsei (1992) and Konami's Tokimeki Memorial (1994), Sorlie said that for Western audiences, True Love was the first entry point into the dating sim further similar titles to be release through distributors like JAST USA. Kretzschmar and Raffel, wrote that True Love was an "interesting blip in dating sim and visual novel history" due to it adding status check screens and other role-playing elements into the gameplay.

Daisuke is one of the earliest examples of a bisexual character in videogames. This is seen in a route as the character can have Daisuke engage in a bisexual relationship in a secret route within the game. Academics writing in Interactive Storytelling said this route also stands out as being the only one in the game without a sex scene which they said reflected the limited representations and visibility of queer relationships in video games at the time as it was often hidden in the background or as an afterthought.

== See also ==
- Video games in Japan
- List of video games with LGBTQ characters
