= Tokimeki Memorial 3: Yakusoku no Ano Basho de =

2001 video game

- Developer: Konami Computer Entertainment Tokyo
- Publisher: Konami
- Series: Tokimeki Memorial
- Platform: PlayStation 2
- Release: JP: December 20, 2001
- Genre: Dating sim
- Mode: Single-player

Tokimeki Memorial 3: Yakusoku no Ano Basho de (ときめきメモリアル3 〜約束のあの場所で〜, Tokimeki Memoriaru Surī ~Yakusoku no Ano Basho de~) is a 2001 dating sim video game for the PlayStation 2, developed and published by Konami.

It is the first title in the Tokimeki Memorial series to feature dynamic 3-D character models of the love interests, as opposed to the 2-D sprites of prior installments. The title is also notable for utilizing crowdfunding, with fans being encouraged to invest in the game's development. It received mixed reviews from critics, with the difficulty, story and character models being sources of criticism.

== Gameplay ==
Tokimeki Memorial 3 is a dating simulation video game set in a Japanese high school. The player selects activities such as personal grooming and participation in school clubs which increase and decrease the protagonist's various stats, with the aim of molding him into a desirable partner for one of the game's female leads. The aim is to attract a partner of the player's choosing over three in-game years. The protagonist's stats, conversational responses and choice of clothing must match their desired love interest's preferences in order to achieve a desired ending.

Unlike previous titles in the series that utilized 2-D sprites, this installments features cel-shaded 3-D character models of the love interests that react dynamically to the player's actions and conversational choices, such as by nodding their heads or shrugging their shoulders.

== Development ==
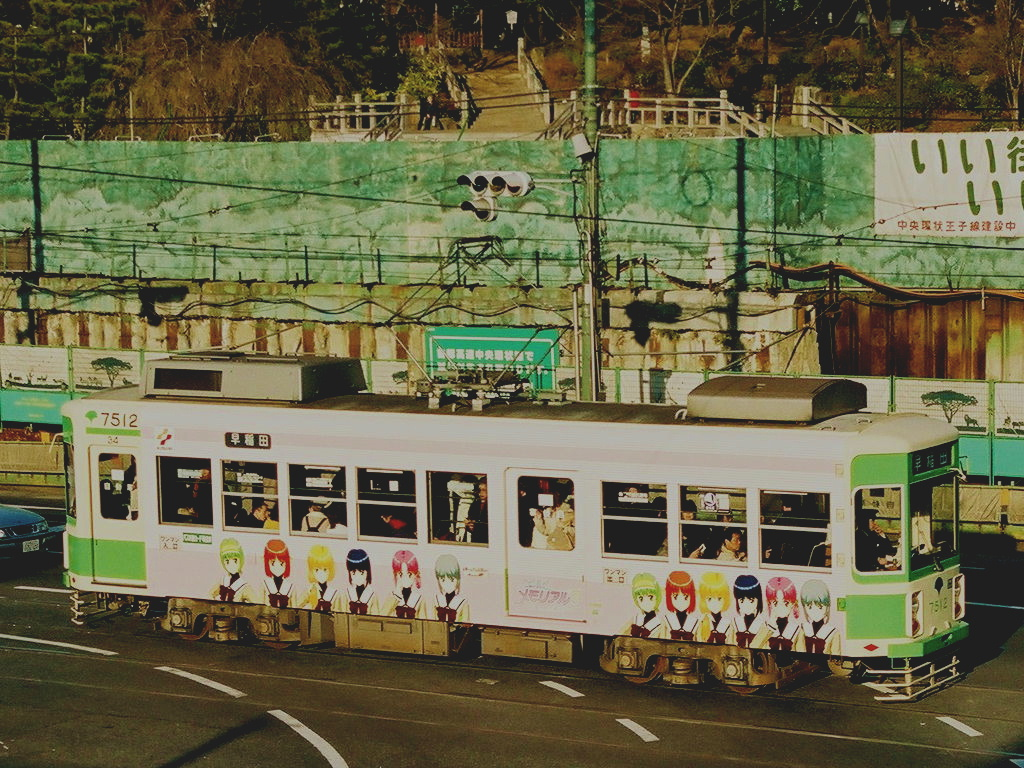
Tokimeki Memorial 3 branding on a Toden tram in January 2002

Development of Tokimeki Memorial 3, alongside Tokimeki Memorial Girl's Side, was supplemented with a 'Game Fund', an investment trust which enabled fans to invest in the development, with the promise of a financial return if the games proved commercially successful.

Tokimeki Memorial 3 was developed with the aim of popularizing the niche Tokimeki Memorial series among a broader audience. This entailed an expansive marketing campaign, including a theme song by the popular band ZARD, advertising on Toden trams and Toei buses, and tie-ins with TV programs, with the game's subtitle of Yakusoku no Ano Basho de being revealed on the Fuji Television variety show Presen Tiger in August 2001.

== Release and reception ==
Reception

Review score
Publication	Score
Famitsu	9/10, 9/10, 8/10, 8/10

Tokimeki Memorial 3 was released on December 20, 2001, in Japan for the PlayStation 2. The game went on to sell 129,534 copies.

On release, the reviewers in Famitsu commented on the graphics, with two reviewers saying they were initially wary of the 3D models, but eventually finding them cute with realistic gestures and expressions. Other reviewers complimented how more elaborate the game was from previous Tokimeki Memorial games. While reviewer said it was the most difficult game in the series yet, another found that the difficulty made the game more rewarding.

The game was criticized by Game Hihyou for its difficulty, length, and the quality of the character models.
