= Tokimeki Memorial Girl's Side: 2nd Kiss =

2006 video game

- Developer(s): Konami
- Publisher(s): Konami
- Series: Tokimeki Memorial
- Platform(s): PlayStation 2, Nintendo DS, Nintendo Switch
- Release: JP: August 3, 2006 (PS2); JP: February 14, 2008 (DS); JP: February 14, 2024 (Switch)
- Genre(s): Dating sim
- Mode(s): Single-player

Tokimeki Memorial Girl's Side: 2nd Kiss is the 2006 sequel to Tokimeki Memorial Girl's Side and the fifth main game in Konami's Tokimeki Memorial dating sim series. An enhanced port to the Nintendo DS featuring additional content and titled Tokimeki Memorial Girl's Side: 2nd Season was released in 2008. A remaster of the Nintendo DS version was released in 2024 to the Nintendo Switch eShop.

It was the final game in the Tokimeki Memorial series to be released on the PlayStation 2, as well as the final console game to date. All subsequent games have been on the Nintendo DS and PlayStation Portable.

Tokimeki Memorial Girl's Side: 2nd Kiss features the return of two voice actors who have appeared in the previous Tokimeki Memorial games. Yuji Ueda plays Motoharu Masaki in this game and had previously played Yoshio Saotome in the first Tokimeki Memorial game. His character was so popular that he was the only male character to get an album CD prior to the Tokimeki Memorial Girl's Side series. Kenji Nojima plays Kazuyuki Akagi and had previously played Junichirou Hokari in Tokimeki Memorial 2.

== Game features ==
After the success of the first Tokimeki Memorial Girl's Side, Konami released this installment, featuring all the special characteristics from the first game and adding its own features, such as the Best Friend mode, new clothes and a fixed system. The DS version adds two new characters and the Skinship feature.

== Game content ==
The protagonist is a high school student at Hanegasaki High School, located in Habataki City, the city of the first game (the game starts around the time the first game's protagonist graduates). While leading a normal high school life including academics, club activities and part-time work, it is also possible to become friendly with boys who can make a declaration of love on graduation day.

== Legend ==
In this game, the legend is about a young man who fell in love with a mermaid. Both loved each other, but the villagers didn't like their relationship, and the mermaid had to leave. The young man sailed looking for her, but he didn't return. This story is told by a young boy to the protagonist as a young girl in a lighthouse next to the beach. She doesn't talk due to her shyness, but the boy asks her if she's a mermaid and promises her that they'll meet again.

== Characters ==
=== Male characters ===
Teru Saeki (佐伯 瑛, Saeki Teru)
CV: Morita Masakazu
The main male character of the game. He is good at studies and sports, an all-rounded guy who is popular with everyone, but he finds a need to carry a facade in front of others and hides the fact that he works as a waiter at Sangosho cafe. Saeki has a club of squealing fangirls who follow him around.

Katsumi Shiba (志波 勝己, Shiba Katsumi)
CV: Nakai Kazuya
He's the typical manly guy - sporty, silent, with a matching tan to boot. Shiba has a secret passion for baseball. Despite his tough looks, he is fond of animals, especially the cute ones. He is a little distant at first, but he warms up to player once he gets to know him better.

Itaru Hikami (氷上 格, Hikami Itaru)
CV: Suzuki Chihiro
The student council's president. He is studious and extremely zealous of school rules. He is endearing in a way that he seems to fit more in the 80s than in the present century, such as wearing safety helmet, coupled with his insane punctuality and recognition of holding hands as a form of "escort". Hikami is also Himuro Reichii's cousin.

Kounoshin Hariya (針谷 幸之進, Hariya Kounoshin)
CV: Suzumura Kenichi
Hariya is the kind of guy that's really fashion-conscious and "in-style". He nicknamed himself "Harry" and is part of a rock band. His design is strongly based on today's Japanese youth. He is popular and outgoing, pierced, has spiked up hair, listens to modern rock and pop, uses youth slang. He works at Nei Music Store.

Christopher Weatherfield (クリストファー・ウェザーフィールド, Kurisutofā Uezāfīrudo)
CV: Kanbara Daichi
Christopher hails from England and has an unusual Japanese accent. He loves art and is a member of school's art club. He is actually the heir to a pretty big business run by his father, though he seems a little unprepared for such a role.

Shōta Amachi (天地 翔太, Amachi Shōta)
CV: Makoto Naruse
Amachi enters Hanegasaki High at the 2nd year, which makes him the player's junior. He has a sweet, polite personality and is very fond of sweet food, but the player can discover a different side of him that is devilishly mischievous and protective of the main character, despite his looks. He is also quite popular with younger girls. He is part of the Cheerleading Squad.

Takafumi Wakaouji (若王子 貴文, Wakaouji Takafumi)
CV: Morikawa Toshiyuki
The player's homeroom teacher. He is nice and smart teacher who teaches Chemistry and is rumoured to be a prodigy. His young, handsome looks made him popular among the female students who nicknamed him "Waka-sama". He is also the advisor of the Track and Field club.

Motoharu Masaki (真咲 元春, Masaki Motoharu)
CV: Ueda Yuji
Masaki is a student at a second-rate university who was graduated from Hanegasaki High. He is working part-time job as botanist at Anneri floral shop. He is the only one of the dateable men in the game who drives a car.

Kazuyuki Akagi (赤城 一雪, Akagi Kazuyuki)
CV: Nojima Kenji
A "secret" character, Akagi is a student from Habataki High. Due to his role as Habataki Student Council President, he sometimes visits Hanegasaki High and works together with Hikami.

Taku Komori (古森 拓, Komori Taku)
CV: Matsubara Daisuke
Extra character for NDS version, Taku is a second-year transfer student from Kirameki High. He is introverted and anti-social. For some reasons, he dislikes going to school and tends to ditch a lot. He'll open up if the player consistently visits him. His surname "Komori" possibly derived from hikikomori.

Tarō Majima (真嶋 太郎, Majima Tarō)
CV: Kishō Taniyama
Like Komori, Majima is also an extra character in the NDS version. He is a year older senior of the player at Hanegasaki High. He is very charming, but also extremely flirty. The player may pursue him by working at Alucard coffee shop after his graduation.

=== Female characters ===
Tatsuko Tōdō (藤堂 竜子, Tōdō Tatsuko)
CV: Naomi Shindō
Tatsuko is a girl with a huge fan following of guys and girls alike. She works part-time at Stallion Gasoline station. Though Tatsuko seems a little intimidating at first, she's actually nice and dependable. Tatsuko is a rival for Shiba.

Chiyomi Onoda (小野田 千代美, Onoda Chiyomi)
CV: Etsuko Kozakura
Onoda is an active member of student council. Polite and friendly, she is also a studious type student and very obedient of the school rules. She has a passion for animal-printed objects. Chiyomi is a rival for Hikami.

Haruhi Nishimoto (西本 はるひ, Nishimoto Haruhi)
CV: Ai Maeda
Nishimoto is a cheerful girl who speaks with a Kansai dialect. She hails from Osaka and loves eating sweets and reading romance novels. Nishimoto works part time at Anastasia Confectionery. She is a rival for Hariya.

Hisoka Mizushima (水島 密, Mizushima Hisoka)
CV: Yuko Minaguchi
Mizushima is good at sewing and cooking, and speaks in a feminine manner, but several characters denote that this may be a facade. She is part of the school band and is a rival for Chris.

=== Other characters ===
Yuu Otonari (音成遊, Otonari Yuu)
CV: Yumiko Kobayashi
An elementary school student and the main character's assistant in her love affairs.

Himeko Hanatsubaki (花椿 姫子, Hanatsubaki Himeko)
CV: Fumiko Matsuzaki
Goro's niece, she is also interested in fashion and writes a column about the latest trends. She is the advisor for the Camellia club, which assists any clubs without official advisors. She calls the heroine "Daisy".

Souichirou Saeki (佐伯総一郎, Saeki Souichirou)
CV: Kouji Yada
Teru's grandfather, master of Sangosho, he is a kind person cares about Teru and the player. He mentioned that he used to be a pretty wild guy in the past.

== Reception ==
Jenni Lada, writing for Technology Tell, gave Tokimeki Memorial Girl's Side: 2nd Season a perfect 10/10 score and called it "my all time favorite DS title".
