= Mami Kingetsu =

Japanese voice actress and singer (born 1965)

- 金月 真美
- Born: April 2, 1965 (age 61); Akashi, Hyōgo, Japan
- Occupations: Voice actress; singer
- Years active: 1970–present
- Agent: Aoni Production
- Musical career
- Genres: Pop
- Instrument: Vocals
- Years active: 1995–present
- Labels: King; Konami Digital; Most Company

Mami Kingetsu (金月 真美, Kingetsu Mami; born April 2, 1965) is a Japanese voice actress and singer from Akashi, Hyōgo. She is currently affiliated with Aoni Production. She is best known for her role as Shiori Fujisaki in the Tokimeki Memorial series. Other notable roles include Izumi Himuro in Princess Nine, Nagisa Shiozaki in If I See You In My Dreams, Miss Merry Christmas & Stussy in One Piece, Rei Kazama in eX-Driver, Maki Kawasaki in Burn Up Excess, Li Xiangfei in Fatal Fury / The King of Fighters; and Da Ji in Warriors Orochi.

== Filmography ==
=== Anime ===
List of voice performances in anime
Year	Title	Role	Notes	Source
1989	Super Mario: Fire Brigade	Kaoru's Mother		
1995	Saint Tail	Sakiko	Ep. 41	
1997	Kindaichi Case Files	Emily Miura	Ep. 95-99	
1997	Burn-Up Excess	Maki	Also sang the opening theme "SHOW TIME"	
1998	Princess Nine	Izumi Himuro		
1998	Gasaraki	Miharu		
1998	If I See You in My Dreams	Nagisa Shiozaki	TV series	
1999	Crest of the Stars	Fegudakupe Muinishu		
1999	Sekai no hikaru shinranshonin ja:世界の光 親鸞聖人	Shinichi Kaku	OVA ep. 6	
1999	Gokudo	Jin (female)		
1999	Shin Hakkenden	Ayashi		
1999	I'm Gonna Be An Angel!	Shinobu-sensei		
1999	Tokimeki Memorial	Shiori Fujisaki	OVA	
2000	Shinzo	Runaria	Ep. 22-26	
2000	Labyrinth of Flames	Carrie		
2000	Sci-Fi Harry	Merrill		
2000	Pipopapopatoru-kun ja:ピポパポパトルくん	Momoko		
2001	Run=Dim	Ianzu Konno		
2001	Star Ocean EX	Celine Jules		
2002	Genma Wars	Non Namie	TV series	
2002	One Piece	Miss Merry Christmas		
2002	Magical Shopping Arcade Abenobashi	Fumiko Asahina, Shiotan		
2002	The Twelve Kingdoms	Akikancho		
2002	ex-Driver: Nina & Rei Danger Zone	Rei Kazama		
2002	Hanada Shōnen Shi	Melon		
2002	Case Closed	Eiko Nojima	Ep. 299-300	
2002–03	Barom-1	Hamada-sensei		
2003	Machine Robo Rescue	Elias's mother		
2004	Monkey Turn	Chiaki Kushida		
2004	Paranoia Agent	Homeroom teacher		
2004	Master Keaton	Claire		
2004	Interlude	Izumi Marufuji	OVA	
2004	Monkey Turn V	Chiaki Kushida		
2004	Re: Cutie Honey	Cobalt Claw	OVA	
2004–05	Blue Seed	Reiko Kanbayashi		
2004–11	Ring ni Kakero 1	Takako Kawai	TV series	
2005	Peach Girl	Misao Aki		
2005	Gun Sword	Elena		
2005	Petopeto-san	Maruko Fujimura		
2005	SoltyRei	Natalie Roman		
2006	Yōkai Ningen Bem	Succubus		
2006	Powerpuff Girls Z	Koroko		
2006	Lili to kaeru to (Ototo) ja:リリとカエルと(弟)	Mama		
2006	Hell Girl: Two Mirrors	Ran Hemni		
2006	Happy Lucky Bikkuriman	Venus Shirayuki		
2007	GeGeGe no Kitaro	Shirokihatsu, Futaruchionna	5th TV series	
2007	Dennou Coil	Shizue Okongi		
2007	Hatara Kizzu Maihamu Gumi	Kiriko Ogami		
2008	Kaiba	Rama		
2008	Someday's Dreamers	Kazene Toen		
2009	源氏物語千年紀 Genji	Young woman		
2011	Sket Dance	Fuefuki's mother		
2011	Croisée in a Foreign Labyrinth	Lady		
2014	Kamigami no Asobi	Yui's mother		
2014	Sailor Moon Crystal	Woman lecturer		
2015	Venus Project Climax	Teacher		
2018	One Piece	Stussy, Charlotte Compote		

=== Film ===
List of voice performances in film
Year	Title	Role	Notes	Source
2007	One Piece Movie: The Desert Princess and the Pirates: Adventures in Alabasta	Miss Merry Christmas		
2008	Detective Conan: Full Score of Fear	Shine Yamane		

=== Video games ===
List of voice performances in video games
Year	Title	Role	Notes	Source
1994–2002	Tokimeki Memorial	Shiori Fujisaki		
1996	Tactics Ogre: Let Us Cling Together	Deneb Loeb, Okushinou Ravuin, Shelley Forina	Sega Saturn	
1997	Tengai Makyō: Daiyon no Mokushiroku	Alisa	Sega Saturn	
1997	Voice Idol Maniacs Pool Bar Story	Herself	Sega Saturn	
1997	Atelier Marie: The Alchemist of Salburg	Flare Schenk, Aura Kyuru	PS1/PS2	
1998	Kindaichi Case Files: Star Viewing Island: Sad Demon of Revenge	Mai Tachibana	Sega Saturn	
1998	Real Bout Fatal Fury 2	Li Xiangfei	Arcade	
1998	Doki Doki On Air Final	Herself	Windows	
1998	Atelier Elie: The Alchemist of Salburg 2	Flare Schenk	PS1/PS2	
1999	Fatal Fury: Wild Ambition	Li Xiang Fei		
1999	The King of Fighters '99	Li Xiang Fei	Arcade	
1999	ja:ピノッチアのみる夢	Sharon, Piada Aruman	PS1/PS2	
1999	Purumui Purumui			
1999	Boys Be 2nd season	Naho Minamitate	PS1/PS2	
1999	Ouka Houshin	Rai Seishou	DreamCast	
2000	Cool Cool Toon	Yusa	DreamCast	
2000	Happy Salvage ja:ハッピィサルベージ	Roshidi Sugiyama	PS1/PS2	
2001	The King of Fighters 2001	Li Xiang Fei		
2002	Simple 2000 Ultimate Series Vol. 1: Love*Smash! Super Tennis Players; SIMPLE2000シリーズ Ultimate Vol.1 ラブ★スマッシュ！	Tsuetsuiria Lorraine		
2002	From TV Animation - One Piece: Grand Battle! 2	Miss Merry Christmas	PlayStation	
2002	Reveal Fantasia	Rebecca Hamilton	PS2	
2002	Thread Colors ja:Thread Colors〜さよならの向こう側〜	Karisu Fukanuma	PS1/PS2	
2002	Tomak: Save the Earth Love Story	Dezawa		
2003	Guardian Angel	Niina Ganashe		
2003	Interlude	Izumi Marfuji		
2003	Love Smash! 5: Tennis Robo no Hanran ja:ラブ★スマッシュ!5 〜テニスロボの反乱〜	Tsuetsuiria Lorraine	PS1/PS2	
2004	Generation of Chaos	Rose Reitamu	PS1/PS2	
2004	The Twelve Kingdoms ja:十二国記 -赫々たる王道 紅緑の羽化-	Rin ran, Aki kancho 琳欄 / 秋官長	PS1/PS2	
2004	Monkey Turn V	Chiaki Kushida	PS1/PS2	
2004	Kessen III	Amalia, Oichi, Omasaru	PS1/PS2	
2005	Shinki Genso Spectral Souls II ja:新紀幻想スペクトラルソウルズ	Rose, Nail	PS1/PS2	
2006	Otometeki Koi Kakumei Love Revo!!	Yurika Tojo	Also Portable	
2006	Tengai Makyō: Daiyon no Mokushiroku	Alisa Star, Mika	PSP	
2007	Queens Road	Rafiine Oracion	PlayStation	
2007	Warriors Orochi	Da Ji	PS1/PS2	
2007	Generation of Chaos Desire	Rose Reitamu	PS1/PS2	
2008	Warriors Orochi 2	Da Ji	PS1/PS2	
2008	Tales of Symphonia: Dawn of the New World	Alice	Wii	
2009	Yakuza 3	Yuko	PS3	
2011	Tales of the World: Radiant Mythology 3	Original Kanonno	PSP	
2019	The King of Fighters All Star	Li Xiang Fei	Android/iOS	

=== Dubbing ===
List of voice performances in overseas dubbing
Title	Role	Notes	Source
Black Serenade	Michelle		
Fireman Sam	Norman Price		
Felicity	Ruby		
Teddy Bear and Friends	Dixie		
Track Down	Alyssa		

=== Audio ===
List of voice performances in audio recordings and broadcasts
Title	Role	Notes	Source
Tokimeki Memorial series	Shiori Fujisaki	Drama CD	
Bus Tour	Elizabeth	Radio	
Hananokeiji 花の慶次	Bō karashi no hotaru	Radio	
Hateshinaku aoi, kono sora no shita de. 果てしなく青い、この空の下で・・・。	Eriko	Drama CD	
Hotarukonsheruju	Azumi	Radio	
Itte rasshai, papa 逝ってらっしゃい、パパ	Michiru Nakata	Radio	
Kimi dake wo Mitsumeterua	Egami Sorami	Drama CD	
Kimi, kurisutīna to yobi-kyū e 君、クリスティーナと呼び給へ	Christina	Radio	
Kingetsu Mami no Gensou Yawa (Fantastic Nights)	Herself	Drama CD	
Kino's Journey: The Beautiful World	Nimya	Drama CD	
Kodakara Chitose no uedingu fairu 子宝千歳のウエディングファイル	Chitose Kodakara	Radio	
Kon'ya, 101-gōshitsu de 今夜、101号室で	Akiko Minami	Radio	
Minaminoteiō ミナミの帝王	Sarina	Radio	
MPD-PSYCHO サイコ サウンド・ストーリー	Kasui Tokorezane	Drama CD	
Nemurihime Age	Ayane Mori	Drama CD	
Oh Henry Natsunoyo no Echudo オー・ヘンリー 夏の夜のエチュード	Helen	Radio	
Oi, Reiko-san ga gokigen nanameda zo! ! おい、麗子さんがゴキゲンななめだぞ！！	Reiko Saionji	Radio	
On'na no teki 女の敵	Michiyo	Radio	
Sabutoichitorimonohikae 佐武と市捕物控	Satake no ane Sanae	Radio	
Sanchōmenoyūhi yūyake no uta 三丁目の夕日 夕焼けの詩	Ghost	Radio	
Shinanai otoko wa kan'oke de nidone suru 死なない男は棺桶で二度寝する	Eri	Radio	
Shiritsu tantei fanī-san 私立探偵ファニーさん	Yoko Sakakibara	Radio	
Subete wa kurisumasu no tame ni 全てはクリスマスの為に	Nagisa	Radio	
Tetsu neko nanatsu no bōken 哲ねこ七つの冒険	Nyamonu	Radio	
The Debut	Karin, Mikan, Lemon	Drama CD	
World's end I FIRST STEP	Rurutia Ganett	Drama CD	

== Discography ==
Albums

- Tokimeki (ときめき) (Konami, 1996)
- Catchy (Konami, 1996)
- Summer Break (サマーブレイク, Samā Bureiku) (Konami, 1997)
- K-Brand (Konami, 1998)
- Touch and Go (Konami, 1998)
- From the Bests (Konami, 1999)
- Hibiscus (ハイビスカス, Haibisukasu) (King, 2000)
- Vintage (King, 2001)
- Love Clue (King, 2001)
- Watashi no Tsubasa (Toei, 2002)
- Rainbow (Most, 2015)

Compilation albums

- Takamono (たからもの, Treasure) (Konami, 2004)
