= Bishōjo game =

Type of Japanese video game with attractive girls

A bishōjo game (Japanese: 美少女ゲーム, Hepburn: bishōjo gēmu; lit. "pretty girl game") or gal game (ギャルゲーム, gyaru gēmu; often shortened to "galge") is "a type of Japanese video game centered on interactions with attractive girls".

Bishōjo games are similar to Choose Your Own Adventure books in the way of narrative, in which the game tells a story, but the player may make choices to change how the story flows.

== History ==
=== 1980s ===
Bishōjo games started appearing in Japan in the beginning days of personal computers. The first bishōjo game commercialized in Japan appeared in 1982 as Night Life by Koei. The first bishōjo games were not very popular. At the beginning of the genre, almost all the games were pornographic.

A notable landmark was Jast's Tenshitachi no gogo (1985), a precursor to the modern dating simulation. Among early bishōjo adventure games, it had a degree of polish that previous games lacked. It was also the first to have modern anime-style artwork: its characters had large eyes and a tiny nose and mouth, but were otherwise normally proportioned, features which today are found in virtually all bishōjo games. Prior to 1985, girls were often drawn either as normally proportioned adults or super deformed children.

=== 1990s ===
The industry gradually moved away from proprietary Japanese hardware to the burgeoning MS-DOS platform, and then later in the decade to Windows. Throughout the nineties, bishōjo games underwent an evolution from being one of the most technologically demanding types of games (because their detailed 2D graphics required a large amount of storage space by the standards of early computers) to one of the least (they rarely use 3D graphics). Thus, more than regular games, the main employees required by bishōjo game companies today are not programmers, but artists and writers.

In the early nineties, the atmosphere in Japan became more and more hostile towards bishōjo games. In 1989, serial killer Tsutomu Miyazaki was arrested and was revealed to be a consumer of lolicon manga, causing widespread opposition to pornographic manga, otaku and anything similar. In November 1991, there was an incident where a middle-schooler shoplifted an adult bishōjo game Saori: the House of Beautiful Girls, resulting in increased police scrutiny for makers and retailers. Several prefectures began classifying games as obscene and pulling them off the shelves.

Faced with the threat of being forcibly censored out of existence by the government, in 1992, the bishōjo game industry formed the Computer Software Rinri Kikō (meaning "Ethics Organization for Computer Software", and often abbreviated EOCS or Sofu-rin), setting industry guidelines for acceptable content and packaging. This organization tamed down the most objectionable content in the "wild west" of the 1980s. Free from controversy and fueled by continuing improvement in technology, in the 1990s, the bishōjo game industry underwent a decade-long boom.

The first significant title of the 1990s was Tokimeki Memorial, released in 1994 by Konami which was on the verge of bankruptcy. It was a platonic dating sim that became the first major bishōjo game since Koei's release of Night Life. In 1999, Kanon was released by Visual Arts/Key. While the title was another eroge title targeted at men for its sexual content, the players began to identify with the protagonist and the idea of overcoming "the emotional trials and tribulations of pure love." A late PlayStation 2 port removed the sexual content and sold better than the original, eventually leading to two anime adaptations.

A turning point was ELF's Dōkyūsei (1992). Dōkyūsei, whose gameplay focused on meeting girls and seducing them, established the standard conventions of the dating simulation genre. Tokimeki Memorial, the first dating sim, featured good graphics, full voice acting, and a role-playing game-like gameplay system. To be accessible to a more mainstream audience, it contained no erotic elements, seeking instead to create a "romantic" atmosphere. Sega's popular bishōjo game series Sakura Wars also first saw publication in 1996 for the Sega Saturn. Like Tokimeki Memorial, it contained no erotic elements. However, it was unique in that it contained not only adventure-game elements, but also a combat system borrowed from tactical combat games such as Tactics Ogre.

Since the late nineties, there has been a trend towards better storytelling in mainstream bishōjo games. Particularly notable in this respect are Leaf's To Heart (1997), and Key's Kanon (1999). Even though their gameplay involved little more than scrolling through text, they became hits largely due to the quality of their writing and characterization. Both were first released on the PC with erotic scenes, which were subsequently removed in their console ports.

=== 2000s ===
The bishōjo gaming industry has resisted the transition into 3D graphics because of the blocky and distorted nature of characters when viewed zoomed up close. In 2001, Tokimeki Memorial 3 became the first bishōjo game to break this trend. However, low sales make it likely that other companies will stick with the traditional 2D graphics.

Today the industry has grown, with most publishers making releases for Windows, including download-only files. Some of the least pornographic and most successful also branching off into the console market. The main consoles used for bishōjo games in the nineties were the Sega Saturn and Dreamcast. More recently, the PlayStation 2 has been the console of choice with a growing number of games for the PlayStation Portable and Nintendo DS handhelds. Games ported to consoles usually have adult content removed.

== Characteristics ==
The industry of bishōjo games is closely related to the industry of anime and Japanese manga. While many of the games are pornographic, the majority feature romantic situations with suggestive material.

Some dōjinshi groups produce bishōjo games, many with the objective to later form a real company or to be contracted by one of the great companies in the industry. Due to the short programming time and the relatively small amount of content required in a bishōjo game, barriers to enter this industry is somewhat low, and is the reason why every year dozens of new companies emerge.

A substantial part of the revenue of the industry comes from merchandising. Fans are often dedicated to particular characters within their favorite games, and are willing to pay premium prices for goods like posters, figurines and accessories representing them. Several conventions also exist where articles oriented to bishōjo fans are sold, like the popular dōjinshi market Comiket in Tokyo, Japan.

Due to the representation of female characters in the majority of bishōjo games, a great majority of the market is male. Nevertheless, from the year 2000, some developers began to expand their market, creating games directed to girls and presenting attractive young men in their cast (bishōnen). The most well-known and commercial of these titles is Konami's experiment Tokimeki Memorial Girl's Side (2002). There have even appeared a small number of erotic games that present man–man homosexual relations (yaoi games), which take their bases from the parallel subculture of yaoi anime and manga. Games targeted specifically at female players are not referred to as bishōjo games, but categorized under the broader genre of adventure or simulation by publishers, and commonly referred to as otome games or Boys' Love games by fans and reviewers.

=== Gameplay ===
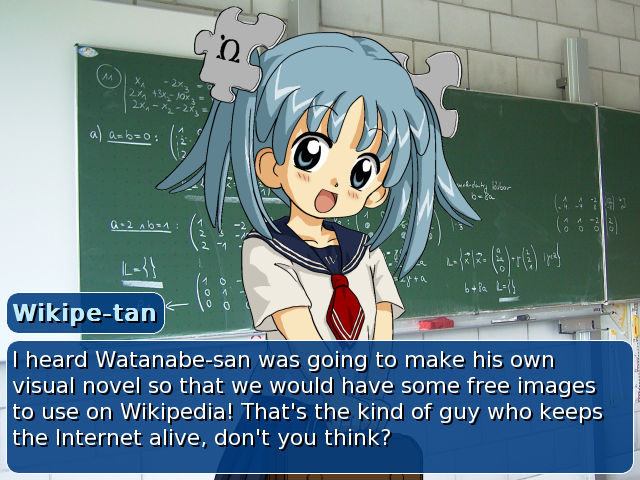
A depiction of a visual novel-type bishōjo game

Bishōjo game elements can be present in practically any type of video game, and gameplay in bishōjo games varies within the genre. There are still some basic formulas that define the genre. The basic characteristics of bishōjo games resemble those of Choose Your Own Adventure books. The basic appearance of a bishōjo game consists of an image in the upper portion, a text box in the lower portion and a static background that occasionally changes extending to the edge behind both of the other two areas. The background images are often reused for various scenes and text descriptors are used to help distinguish differences in the surrounding. In most of the games, the player does not see their avatar and instead see the game from a first person perspective. In addition, some games use several techniques, like the screen shaking, flashing or going black, to give further immersion by demonstrating various conditions. The range of sound effects are also used to represent the avatar's eardrums. The characters of these games are less realistic and often limited to only several static facial expression, gestures and occasional eye blinks, of which the former two coincide with the text displayed at the bottom of the scene and are constantly reused.

The basic storylines for these games center around a male protagonist whom the player controls, who interacts with various characters, notably women. Interaction occurs at several points where choices—seemingly trivial—are given to the player while life-altering choices are generally not. These choices eventually lead to various good or bad endings with (or without for some bad endings) one or more female characters.

Beating these games does not mean just getting various good endings, but also in some cases bad endings, as the goal is to unlock all of the bonus content. This makes getting the same ending twice and not unlocking any new content the way to lose such games. For example, Gals Panic is a variant of the classic game Qix where the goal is to uncover 75% or more of a picture of a girl. Money Idol Exchanger is a puzzle game comparable to the Magical Drop series (which is also categorized as a bishōjo game). In some cases, images of girls are used as prizes for skilled play, as is the case in strip mahjong. In other games, the bishōjo aspect can be integrated more tightly into the game: in most dating sims, the objective is to select the correct conversation lines while speaking with a female character to increase their "love meter". This type of game resembles role-playing or adventure games. Many are very linear and are essentially interactive romance novels for men (sometimes called visual novels).

Most bishōjo games remain 2D. The main reason is that bishōjo games are primarily centered on characters instead of landscapes, and for this intention, 2D bitmaps continue to look better than 3D models (which tend to be blocky when viewed up close). The main advantage of 3D models in this context is smoother and more realistic animation, although this is usually discarded by the unpolished look of the 3D characters, in addition to the extra cost of production for this type of work. Tokimeki Memorial 3 (2001) was the first bishōjo game to have all its characters modeled in 3D, although the sales were lower than hoped, perhaps discouraging other developers from the possibility of changing bishōjo games from 2D to 3D. Many bishōjo games nowadays are essentially a slideshow of 2D pictures plus voice and text.

=== Pornographic content ===
While there are a number of bishōjo games entirely focused on hardcore pornography, many of the most popular titles, including all those available for home video consoles, do not contain pornographic material, and many others only contain a small amount in relation to the story as a whole. For example, the 18+ version of the popular game Sabbat Of The Witch (also known as Sanoba Witch) contains a total of twenty-four short adult scenes within a branched story.

The pornographic content of bishōjo games is regulated by the Ethics Organization of Computer Software (EOCS), the organization in charge of classifying the content of video games in the Japanese industry. Pornography is prohibited in all console titles, and computer games are assigned a special classification alerting the public to its content. Also, as in all legal Japanese pornography, the explicit images are normally censored, showing mosaics or bars on the genital areas in order to satisfy Japanese decency laws.

Pornographic bishōjo games are often catalogued as "hentai games" in the West. In Japan, they are usually called ero-games, or frequently eroge.

=== Representation of women ===
The representation of girls in bishōjo games varies, but two generalizations can be made. First, most of the girls are portrayed as bishōjo, meaning beautiful, attractive or cute.

Two particularly common settings exist: Japanese secondary schools and medieval-atmosphered, pseudo-European fantasy lands. In secondary education settings, characters wear idealized Japanese school uniforms; whereas fantasy setting outfits range from witch robes to princess dresses, and fantastic creatures like fairies and catgirls may be found as well. When the game takes place in some other setting, it tends to explore other fashion possibilities. For example, the game Pia Carrot is located in a restaurant, in which the girls wear elaborate waitress uniforms.

The female characters frequently act in an endearingly childlike fashion, which is described by the Japanese slang term moe, a characteristic that is often looked-for in bishōjo characters. The reasons for this characteristic are not always merely sexual: sometimes it is used to present a pretty and affectionate character who is beloved and supported by the player. In fact, "little sisters" are a recurring fixture of bishōjo games. A very popular game that emphasizes the characteristic of moe is Sister Princess, based on the premise of the player acquiring no fewer than twelve little sisters.

Most bishōjo games involve anime girls and not pictures of real-life girls. Since some characters in bishōjo games are minors, the use of drawn characters allows the studios of bishōjo games with adult content to avoid the penalty of Japanese child pornography laws, which prohibit the depiction of real minors under 18 years of age. Even so, the EOCS requests that all characters who appear to be minors be labeled as 18 years of age.

=== Representation of men ===
The main male character in bishōjo games is often rendered as someone the player can identify with, thus experiencing the story as he would live an episode of his own life. The game is often viewed in a first person view of the main character.

Since bishōjo games focus on female characters and the player's interaction with them, male characters often receive less time on-screen and the character that represents the player rarely appears. When this happens, his face is usually hidden outside the screen or otherwise, and he might not even be voiced. Sometimes the only male appearance in sex scenes is reduced to a penis entering from the side of the screen, with no other visible parts.

== Distribution ==
The genre is extremely popular in Japan. It was estimated as late as 2005 that bishōjo game sales totaled a quarter of all software produced in Japan. It is estimated that an average 50 new titles are released each month or about 500 annually.

Bishōjo games for personal computers are usually sold in special stores or sections reserved for clients more than 18 years old. Nevertheless, console bishōjo games, which are generally less explicit, are sold next to other video games. At the present time, dozens of bishōjo games are released every month, and practically all the video game stores in Japan maintain a sizable stock of these. The games are initially relatively expensive compared to the Western market of videogames, fluctuating between 8,000 and 10,000 yen (approximately $75–95) each, although soon they can be bought more cheaply second-hand.

== Influence in the West ==
The English localization of Princess Maker 2, which was not officially released until 2016

While bishōjo games are produced in Japan for console market, that is largely not the case in the West, where enthusiasm for the subgenre is indifferent. What success these games have had has historically been dependent on the related industries of anime and manga. The common visual novel format that make up the majority of translations has been criticized as boring and not actually games.

In addition, the genre has been associated exclusively with poorly written eroge. The popular discussion of bishōjo games is widely plagued by disagreement and disapproval of pornography. The debate tends to be remarkably divided: on one hand, critics condemn the genre as totally pornographic, while on the other hand, enthusiasts deny this generalization. This question does not cause as much controversy in Japan.

The attempts to massively trade bishōjo games in the West have caused a certain degree of public controversy. An example of this is the attempt to release the PC game Princess Maker 2 in the United States. Though it was never officially released, a few newspapers critically accused the game of sexism. Adding to the uproar was a pre-release screen-capture containing nudity. However, the game is not pornographic; there was some nudity which was already censored by American localizer SoftEgg, and the only way to see any real nudity is through an Easter egg cheat code. Princess Maker attracted negative attention due to the fact it was widely promoted as a mainstream video game, unlike other translated games which had been kept in adult-only channels as pornography.

The dōjinshi webcomic Megatokyo, popular among Western followers of anime, especially in the United States, was inspired in a large extent by dating sims. Megatokyo idealizes bishōjo games while simultaneously expressing another criticism commonly used in the West against them: that players resort to them as a form of escapism because they are socially inept (This type of criticism is also found in Japan, though in a quite different form: see otaku).

While translations of bishōjo games in English remain a relatively niche market confined mostly to the adult genre, elements of the gameplay do exist in a lot of games. Story of Seasons, Persona 3, the Rune Factory series, and other games like them focus on the social interaction and the romancing of attractive anime girls. However, such games also offer much more social ties, even if the gameplay may favor social interaction with women.

=== Cultural transmission ===
Western players can use bishōjo games to help orient themselves to the Japanese culture through aspects of telepresence. However, since bishōjo games rely heavily on iconic nature, their level of perceptual immersion is diminished in comparison to mediums like virtual reality. Instead, they rely on psychological immersion. These games are constructed around popular culture and other social phenomena of Japan which then combined with immersion and telepresence allows a Western player to get a better idea of what it is like living in Japan. According to Mathew T. Jones of Temple University, Peter Payne, founder of Jast USA, says, "You're reaching out and touching a little piece of Japan in the game – you really feel like you're experiencing love and life vicariously through the game characters". By using a first person avatar with Japanese identity, bishōjo games offer an unprecedented means of cultural immersion that, according to Jones, travel and live interpersonal communication cannot. This is done by taking on the Japanese identity that allows for an intimate perspective of the Japanese culture while maintaining the ability to make choices throughout the game. In addition, some English translations offer liner notes or in-game text to explain certain Japanese idiosyncrasies.

The knowledge can be broken into five main categories: language; cultural events; stories; media; and sexual culture. In the former, language, common Japanese words become a part of the player's vocabulary. In addition, games with Japanese voicing adds an additional level of understanding to the player about the language's structure. In addition, major culture events, such as Japanese holidays, are portrayed. The player also comes to understand what stories and legends are known in Japan, both traditional ones and Western ones, and how the latter are seen from a Japanese perspective. Manga titles popular in Japan are frequently referenced in these games and those likely playing the games read many of those manga referenced. Finally, Japanese sexual culture is referenced through the usage of institutes like love hotels, lingerie pubs and erotic public baths.

== Related terms ==
There are a number of terms roughly equivalent to "bishōjo game" in use, both in Japanese and English, and there is considerable disagreement and confusion about their proper use. There is no clear consensus on the precise meaning of many of the terms below. The naming difficulties reflect the fluid boundaries of the genre, as well as embarrassment caused by the pornographic nature of some of these games.

In general, "anime game" can be considered the most general term, and other names designate subgenres. Here are the most common terms currently in use:

Bishōjo game, girl game, gal game
This term designates any game involving pretty anime girls. The Japanese word "bishōjo" literally means "pretty young girl". "Girl game" and "gal game" are also used to describe these games.
Boy's love game, BL game
Girls' "bishōnen" game where teenage boys and young adult men engage in homosexual relationships. Most such games are visual novels (see below). See also Yaoi game.
Otome game
A genre which literally means "maiden game", they are games which are aimed at female players and feature mainly heterosexual relationships. They are sometimes called "reverse harem" or GxB games because the genders of the protagonist and the romanceable characters are the opposite of bishōjo games. Otome games will occasionally contain lesbian romance as well.
Eroge, H game, Hentai game
These terms are used in English to designate anime games with explicit erotic or pornographic elements. "H" is a letter used in Japanese to refer to sexual content, and "erogē" is an abbreviation of "erotic game". "Hentai", meaning "pervert" in Japanese, is not used to describe these games in Japanese, but it is common in English. In Japan, eroge are almost always sold for the PC, because console manufacturers such as Sony and Nintendo generally refuse to license pornographic games for their systems.
Raising sim
This is a subgenre where the goal is to "raise" a character, training and educating them to improve their (usually numerically quantified) attributes. This resembles role-playing games except that the goal is to improve another character rather than yourself, not unlike a digital pet. The classic example is Princess Maker, where the player's task is to raise a girl into a queen. Another is the N64 game Wonder Project J2 with an orphaned robot girl. Many hardcore eroge also start from this premise, in which case the character to be "raised" is usually some kind of sexual slave. This subgenre is called chōkyō (調教, "training"/"breaking" (animals).
A variation of the raising sim genre involves the recruitment and training of pop idols in the guise of a music rhythm game. One popular series of this genre is The Idolmaster.
Romance game (恋愛ゲーム, ren'ai gēmu)
This term describes games focusing on romantic interactions with anime girls. This term is generally used to describe games with little or no erotic content, or games where erotic content is not the main focus. To describe hardcore pornographic games, eroge is preferred. The games are often "love adventure games" (恋愛アドベンチャーゲーム, ren'ai adobenchā gēmu; in short: 恋愛ADV/AVG), or "love simulation games" (恋愛シミュレーションゲーム, ren'ai shimyurēshon gēmu; in short: 恋愛SLG).
Dating sim
Strictly speaking, this term designates simulation games focused on dating, the most famous being Tokimeki Memorial. However, this term is frequently used by English speakers to describe any romance-driven game, regardless of game mechanics used.
Visual novel
This is used to designate a type of game which is particularly story-focused, or containing novel-like narration in its writing. Examples of visual novels include To Heart, Kana: Little Sister, and Clannad. In Japan, such games are generally referred to as "love adventure games" (恋愛ADV/AVG), whereas only such type of games with little to no interaction are called visual novel (ビジュアルノベル, bijuaru noberu) (predominantly for adult games) or novel game (ノベルゲーム, noberu gēmu; in short: NVL).

Many Japanese games which are not strictly bishōjo games also contain elements of the genre. Many mainstream Japanese role-playing or fighting games feature attractive anime girls (such as Final Fantasy VII's Tifa Lockhart or most of the girls in the Dead or Alive video game series), but they are usually not considered bishōjo games unless this is a central aspect.

== See also ==
- List of Japanese erotic video games
- Sexuality in Japan
- Tsundere
