= Shiori Fujisaki =

Tokimeki Memorial character

- Tokimeki Memorial character
- Shiori Fujisaki in Tokimeki Memorial
- First game: Tokimeki Memorial (1994)
- Created by: Masashi Kokura
- Voiced by: Mami Kingetsu

Shiori Fujisaki (Japanese: 藤崎 詩織, Hepburn: Fujisaki Shiori) is a character introduced in the 1994 video game Tokimeki Memorial by Konami. She is one of multiple female characters that can be pursued romantically, but is considered the main character of these girls, as well as the most difficult to pursue due to her being proficient at everything and requiring the player's character to be widely proficient as well before they might date. This has earned her the nickname the "Last Boss of Dating Sims" by fans. She is also a virtual idol, portrayed by Mami Kingetsu, and has appeared in other works, including a live-action film and an OVA.

She has garnered generally positive reception, receiving substantial merchandise and having many enamored fans. Both the difficulty of pursuing her romantically and players' romantic investment in her have been the subject of commentary.

== Concept and creation ==
Shiori Fujisaki was created for the video game Tokimeki Memorial, designed by Masashi Kokura. She was voiced by Mami Kingetsu in various roles, including the original game, an OVA adaptation, and the drama CD. She was given the role after her agency sent an audition tape. For the original game, Kingetsu had to read from a large script, described by fellow Tokimeki Memorial actress Yōko Teppōzuka as being larger than a phone book. Kingetsu was worried about how difficult it may be to do the role due to Shiori being depicted as the "perfect girl"; she felt that other characters had easily defined strengths, but because Shiori was good in everything, she lacked distinct qualities. Kingetsu found her voice in the first game to be plain, adding that in future roles, she was able to explore different angles with her voice. When singing as Shiori for the first time, staff was particular about ensuring that her singing sounded like a high school student's. Composer Takashi Tateishi was involved in helping establish Shiori as a virtual idol, working with Kingetsu.

== Appearances ==
Shiori first appeared in the 1994 video game Tokimeki Memorial for the TurboGrafx-16. She is one of multiple characters whom the protagonist can date, as well as being his childhood crush. She is one of the more challenging characters to date due to her being well-loved and adept at many things. In order to win her over, the protagonist must become adept in a variety of areas as well. She has appeared in multiple other games, including the visual novel spin-off Tokimeki Memorial Drama Series Vol. 3: Tabidachi no Uta, Super Bomberman R, Bombergirl, and as a boss in the shoot 'em up video game Otomedius Excellent. She has also been featured as an object players could summon in the Japanese version of Scribblenauts alongside other Konami characters. Shiori has appeared in various adaptations, including a radio drama, a live-action film, and an OVA film. She first became a virtual idol in December 1996.

== Reception ==
Shiori Fujisaki has received generally positive reception, with VGM Online writer Andy Byus noting that her face was plastered on a variety of merchandise, like shirts and CDs. She was a popular character with Japanese girls, who identified with her. Writers Patrick W. Galbraith and Jason Karlin discussed how Kingetsu was not credited for her role as Shiori in Shiori's debut single "Oshiete Mr. Sky", stating that in the late 1990s, it became standard practice to not attach the performers to virtual idols. "Oshiete Mr. Sky"'s CD debuted at number 27 on the Oricon Charts and was a hit single in Japan according to Galbraith and Karlin. Shiori had an official fan club, and by 2000, it had 10,000 members. Inside Games writer Chi Bi stated that Mami Kingetsu's CD debut of Shiori was a particularly exciting moment for him.

Her role as a romance option in Tokimeki Memorial contributed to her popularity, with her difficulty in romancing her earning her the nickname "Last Boss of Dating Sims" by fans. Chi Bi identified Shiori as a "high-class flower that everyone admired" and a "class Madona", the latter meaning someone who is the object of admiration among men. Because of the difficulty of getting into a relationship with Shiori, he suggested that she came off as prideful, and discussed how people's view of her may differ depending on if they experienced her through Tokimeki Memorial, the radio drama, or Tabidachi no Uta. Chi Bi also discussed how the heightened difficulty of pursuing her only made him more interested in attempting it. While examining the phenomenon behind Tokimeki and other games like it, New York Times writer Andrew Pollack pointed to Shiori as a prominent example of a character players fell in love with, and how these games were used to experience a more successful high school life. Singer Haruko Momoi stated that it was not unusual for people her age to have their first love be someone like Shiori, noting how popular she was and how much merchandise was available at Akihabara.
