= Tokimeki Memorial Girl's Side =

2002 video game

- Developer(s): Konami
- Publisher(s): Konami
- Composer(s): Akari Kaida
- Series: Tokimeki Memorial
- Platform(s): PlayStation 2, Nintendo DS, Nintendo Switch
- Release: JP: June 20, 2002 (PS2); JP: February 15, 2007 (DS); JP: February 14, 2024 (Switch)
- Genre(s): Dating sim, otome game
- Mode(s): Single-player

Tokimeki Memorial Girl's Side (ときめきメモリアルGirl's Side, Tokimeki Memoriaru Girl's Side) is a dating sim video game targeted towards women and girls (an Otome game) released by Konami for the PlayStation 2 game console on June 20, 2002. It was also re-released with enhancements for the Nintendo DS as Tokimeki Memorial Girl's Side: 1st Love on February 15, 2007. A remaster of the Nintendo DS version for the Nintendo Switch was released on February 14, 2024. It has three sequels: Tokimeki Memorial Girl's Side: 2nd Kiss, Tokimeki Memorial Girl's Side: 3rd Story, and Tokimeki Memorial Girl's Side: 4th Heart. Tokimeki Memorial Girl's Side is part of the Tokimeki Memorial series, which originated in 1994 as a male-oriented dating sim.

== Gameplay ==
Tokimeki Memorial Girl's Side is a dating simulation game set in a Japanese high school. Gameplay primarily involves selecting activities for the protagonist to take part in, such as personal grooming and studying, with the aim of increasing and decreasing her stats, such as beauty and intelligence, in order to appeal to one of several male suitors. The player can also invite these love interests on dates to various locations in order to increase their affection with the protagonist.

The player can choose to participate in after-school activities, such as cheerleading and gardening, which also affect the protagonist's stats and affection with her love interests. It is also possible to befriend several female characters, which the protagonist can reach a platonic ending with, or can become rivals with the protagonist, competing for the affection of one of the male love interests.

Additions to the Nintendo DS version include a new love interest, Tendo, and a "skinship" mini-game, in which the player uses the system's touch screen to interact with the love interests: touching the correct areas increases the character in question's affection for the protagonist. The second DS release, Tokimeki Memorial 1st Love Plus, added all the new features from Tokimeki Memorial Girl's Side 2nd Season, as well as compatibility with Nintendo DSi.
