= Anri (given name) =

Anri is both a unisex Japanese given name and a male given name used by Georgians, Abkhazians, Albanians, and Bulgarians, though etymologically unrelated. Georgian ანრი, and Abkhazian & Bulgarian Анри are local forms of the male French given name Henri. Notable people with the name include:

- Anri Grigorov (born 1964), Bulgarian sprinter
- Anri du Toit (born 1984), female vocalist of the South African Rap-Rave-Formation Die Antwoord

== Georgian ==
- Anri Jokhadze (born 1980), Georgian singer
- Anri Okhanashvili (born 1985), Georgian politician
- Anri Tavartkiladze, Georgian wrestler

== Abkhazian ==
- Anri Jergenia (1941–2020), Abkhazian politician
- Anri Khagba (born 1992), Abkhaz-Russian footballer
- Anri Khagush (born 1986), Abkhaz-Russian footballer

== Albanian ==
- Anri Sala (born 1974), Albanian artist
- Anri Hoxha, Albanian politician
- Anri Memlika (born 2005), Albanian footballer

== Japanese ==
- Anri (杏里) (born 1961), Japanese singer-songwriter
- Anri Matsumura (松村 杏里; born 1991), Japanese handball player
- Anri Katsu (勝 杏里), Japanese voice actor
- Anri Kumaki (熊木 杏里) (born 1982), Japanese singer-songwriter
- Anri Shiono (塩野 アンリ), Japanese voice actress
- Anri Okamoto (岡本 杏理) (born 1994), Japanese fashion model and actress
- Anri Okita (沖田杏梨) (born 1983), Japanese singer-songwriter and former AV idol
- Anri Sakaguchi (坂口 杏里) (born 1991), Japanese entertainer.
- Anri Shiono (塩野 アンリ), Japanese voice actress
- Anly (born 1997), Japanese singer-songwriter

== Fictional characters ==
- Anri, one of the protagonists in MegaBeast Investigator Juspion, being an android created by Edjinn and Juspion's companion in his journey
- Anri (Shining Force) (アンリ), princess (and later queen) of Guardiana from the Shining Force series of video games
- Anri of Astora, an NPC in the video game Dark Souls III
- Anri Sonohara, a primary character in Japanese light novel and anime series Durarara!!
- Anri (Fire Emblem), background character and ancestor of Marth
- ANRI, an anthropomorphic sound bank in the voice synthesizer program Synthesizer V.
