= Nanjō-san wa Boku ni Dakaretai =

Japanese manga series

- First tankōbon volume cover, featuring Eri Nanjō

南條さんは僕に抱かれたい
- Genre: Romance
- Manga
- Written by: You2
- Published by: Square Enix
- Imprint: Gangan Comics Online
- Magazine: Gangan Online
- Original run: April 30, 2023 – September 27, 2026
- Volumes: 10

Nanjō-san wa Boku ni Dakaretai (南條さんは僕に抱かれたい) is a Japanese manga series written and illustrated by You2. It was serialized on Square Enix's Gangan Online service from April 2023 to September 2026, and was compiled into nine volumes.

== Plot ==
The series follows Kiyomi, an otaku who likes dating sims. One day, he encounters his classmate Eri Nanjō attempting to have sex with a classmate. Disapproving of her actions, he tells her that he is not interested in her. The next day, Eri changes his appearance to be closer to his preferences. Feeling regrets about her previous promiscuity, Eri asks him out to teach her about real love.

== Characters ==
Kiyomi (清己)
An otaku and Eri's boyfriend. He has a preference for black-haired neat girls similar to the characters in his dating sims. He becomes Eri's boyfriend after she asks him for help in experiencing true love. Despite their initial negative first encounter, he falls in love with Eri and they later have sex.
Eri Nanjō (南條 愛梨, Nanjō Eri)
Kiyomi's classmate and a gyaru. She previously had multiple intimate but short-lived relationships, leading to her wanting to experience true love. She briefly changes her appearance to a black-haired neat girl to satisfy Kiyomi's preferences, but changes back after he says he prefers her to be herself. She was a loner in middle school but changed her personality upon entering high school.

== Publication ==
Written and illustrated by You2, Nanjō-san wa Boku ni Dakaretai was serialized in Square Enix's Gangan Online web service from April 30, 2023 to September 27, 2026. You2 wanted to create a manga that focused on the relationship between an otaku and a gyaru, while adding erotic elements and including their personal preferences. Kiyomi's character and appearance were based on their tastes. They also wanted to emphasize the female characters' cuteness as well as the characters' clothing. One main theme of the series is how Kiyomi and Eri get closer despite having different backgrounds. Ten tankōbon volumes were released from September 12, 2023 to October 9, 2026.

No.	Release date	ISBN
1	September 12, 2023	978-4-7575-8801-1
2	January 12, 2024	978-4-7575-9012-0
3	May 11, 2024	978-4-7575-9190-5
4	September 12, 2024	978-4-7575-9420-3
5	January 10, 2025	978-4-7575-9615-3
6	May 12, 2025	978-4-7575-9859-1
7	September 11, 2025	978-4-301-00057-0
8	January 9, 2026	978-4-301-00279-6
9	May 12, 2026	978-4-301-00523-0
10	October 9, 2026	978-4-301-00816-3
