= Tokimeki Memorial Only Love =

Japanese anime television series

- Cover of the first DVD volume

ときめきメモリアル Only Love (Tokimeki Memoriaru Only Love)
- Anime television series
- Directed by: Yoshihiro Takamoto
- Written by: Akira Watanabe
- Music by: Hajime Mizoguchi; Teruyuki Nobuchika
- Studio: AIC A.S.T.A.
- Original network: TV Tokyo
- Original run: October 3, 2006 – March 27, 2007
- Episodes: 25 + 2 OVAs
- Manga
- Written by: Ryou Hasemi
- Published by: ASCII Media Works
- Magazine: Dengeki Comic Gao!
- Original run: 2007 – 2008
- Volumes: 2

Tokimeki Memorial Only Love (ときめきメモリアル Only Love, Tokimeki Memoriaru Only Love) is a Japanese anime series produced by Konami Digital Entertainment Co., Ltd., based on Konami's popular Tokimeki Memorial dating simulation series, specifically Tokimeki Memorial Online. It premiered October 3, 2006, across Japan on TV Tokyo. The anime series ended its run on March 27, 2007, with 25 episodes. The DVD release includes an additional episode (occurring between episodes 17 and 18) and a special compilation episode for a total of 27 episodes.

== Plot ==
The anime main line story revolves around a second year high school student, Riku Aoba, who has just recently transferred to Holy Cross High School, where he notices, upon joining, several unique and funny occurrences, often being the target of a series of events and races administered by the student council and its fun-seeking president.

While at the academy, Riku meets the original Tokimeki Memorial Online characters and the story begins.

== Characters ==
Riku Aoba (青葉陸, Aoba Riku)
Voiced by: Mamoru Miyano
A second-year student at class 2-A and Sayuri's classmate. Before transferring to Tsugumi, Riku used to live in a snowy harbour in the northeast of Hokkaido. He is often a target of a series of bizarre events and races administered by the school council. Tsukasa, Sayuri, and Mina compete for his affections.
Sayuri Amamiya (天宮小百合, Amamiya Sayuri)
Voiced by: Yuki Makishima
A second-year student at class 2-A. Graceful and intelligent, Sayuri is an extremely popular girl at school, and is talented in academics and sports (and surprisingly video games), often being the subject of admiration from several of the school's male students. Numerous legends have been told of the greatness of her actions in the past year. She falls deeply in love with Riku after noticing he treats her like he treats everyone and she can be herself around him, though she has been hiding her true feelings from everyone's knowledge, including Riku's.
Tsukasa Kasuga (春日つかさ, Kasuga Tsukasa)
Voiced by: Yukako Yoshikawa
A second-year student at class 2-B, Tsukasa is a highly skilled member of the school's volleyball team. She is a believer in destiny, and falls in love with Riku almost immediately after bumping into him one day, declaring that Aoba is her boyfriend from that point on. She is also a bad cook. She successfully changes this by learning from the home economics teacher, but she skips several of the classes afterwards and her cooking becomes terrible again.
Mina Yayoi (弥生水奈, Yayoi Mina)
Voiced by: Saki Fujita
A first-year student at class 1-C, Mina is a member of the school's swimming team. She loves dolphins and is quite shy. She appeared first in the school library, Aoba helped her reach a book about dolphins. After Aoba agrees to become her coach, she falls in love with him. She is nervous to confess her true feelings to him. Also because of her love of the sea life she quite reluctant to prepare food from the sea.
Haru Sakurai (桜井晴, Sakurai Haru)
Voiced by: Ryōhei Nakao
The school council president, who is often engaged in arranging several strange and bizarre events, often involving Riku as the target. He appears to be much lazier or less responsible than expected as he tried to avoid work concerning the Cultural Festival and asked Riku to take part with helping in the Festival (this was possibly to lessen his own work load).
Kōya Inukai (犬飼洸也, Inukai Kōya)
Voiced by: Hiroki Takahashi
Sits next to Riku in class. He appears to be cold and distant from his other classmates even to his teachers, but is far kinder and warmer than he appears. His hobbies include painting and caring for small animals. Riku and him become good friends, which the latter won't actually admit but subtly. When hearing the news that Riku will transfer to another school on the day of the closing ceremony, Inukai is shocked about that.

== Episodes ==
No.	Title	Original air date
1	"An Exciting Encounter" "Tokimeki no Deai" (ときめきの出会い)	October 3, 2006
Riku Aoba transfers to a new school and quickly finds out many of the bizarre customs associated with the school. In the same episode, Riku meets Sayuri and Mina for the first time.
2	"An Exciting Destiny" "Tokimeki no Unmei" (ときめきの運命)	October 10, 2006
Three of the Big Four Sportsmen have taken an interest in Riku and all devise separate plans in order to get him to join their clubs. They belong to the track team, the swimming team, and the baseball team. Fortunately for Riku, he manages to escape from each of their challenges, and receives a special headband from the student council as a reward. In the same episode, Riku meets Tsukasa for the first time by bumping each other. Riku offers to help her up from the ground. Tsukasa noted she felt her heart beat faster when she met her eyes with his and declared that he is her destined lover, much to Riku's surprise and chagrin.
3	"An Exciting After School" "Tokimeki no Hokago" (ときめきの放課後)	October 17, 2006
Riku starts a (forced) relationship with Tsukasa. She tries makes a traditional bento (boxed lunch) though it's so bad that Riku has to force himself to eat it so as not to hurt Tsukasa's feelings. Tsukasa later realizes that her cooking is horrible, and spends time to improve her culinary skills with the home economics teacher to prepare a decent lunch for her "boyfriend". In the same episode, Mina and Riku meet for the second time, only this time, she introduces herself to him properly. Mina gives Riku a handkerchief after he sneezes. Mina leaves in a nervous haste when Riku finds out that she knows his name.
4	"An Exciting Water Surface" "Tokimeki no Minamo" (ときめきの水面)	October 24, 2006
Riku is set on trying to give Mina back her handkerchief, but his two good friends keep on dragging him around. Eventually he is able to give it back to her at which point Mina asks him to be her psychological coach in order to keep her mindset when swimming.
5	"An Exciting Accident" "Tokimeki no Jiko (Akushidento)" (ときめきの事故[アクシデント])	October 31, 2006
The school's sports festival has finally arrived where each class competes against each other in sports related games. When Sayuri injures her ankle halfway through the day, Riku must step in and take her place as the coordinator for the day's activities.
6	"An Exciting Rain" "Tokimeki no Ame" (ときめきの雨)	November 7, 2006
Inukai, in Riku's class, goes missing one day after apparently getting arrested for fighting against a group of thugs. Rumors start to grow about him and his rebellious nature. While Inukai doesn't reveal much about himself to others, he usually lets his actions speak louder than words. Riku starts to wonder why Inukai acts the way he does.
7	"An Exciting Confession" "Tokimeki no Kokuhaku" (ときめきの告白)	November 14, 2006
Riku is coerced by the student council to forfeit half of his summer in preparation for the upcoming cultural festival while he plans it out with Sayuri. At the same time, he is also coerced by the drama club's teacher to audition a play for the festival. During the audition, to Riku's surprise, he accidentally confesses to Sayuri when she shows up to see his audition when he states line from the play. Sayuri is confused by the sudden confession. Meanwhile, Tsukasa is beginning to see the depth of Riku's feelings or lack thereof.
8	"An Exciting Time" "Tokimeki no Hitotoki" (ときめきの時)	November 21, 2006
After yesterday's surprise event in the drama room, Sayuri is uneasy about hanging around Riku for a while. Riku and Mina find a temple shrine while on their way home. Riku gives an offering and a prayer for Mina so she can improve her swimming times before the big swim meet, but Mina requests her own prayer that leaves Riku surprised. Meanwhile, Tsukasa's volleyball talents are beginning to be adversely affected by her feelings for Riku.
9	"An Exciting Sea" "Tokimeki no Umi" (ときめきの海)	November 28, 2006
Tsukasa and Riku go to the beach to have fun together, but Tsukasa is finding it difficult to be alone with him when almost the entire school shows up.
10	"An Exciting Nightfall" "Tokimeki no Maiyuugure" (ときめきの夕暮れ)	December 5, 2006
During the summer vacation, Riku and his friends get part time jobs but soon find out how difficult they can be. Meanwhile, Sayuri is working very hard in the oversight committee for the up-coming school cultural festival all by herself, whom Riku is very concerned.
11	"An Exciting Memory" "Tokimeki no Kioku (Memori)" (ときめきの記憶[メモリー])	December 12, 2006
After a swimming tournament, Mina's popularity has skyrocketed, but several members of her own club become jealous of her and her growth of followers start to stress her out. Mina tries to find Riku to tell him how she feels on the whole situation, though she's finding it just as difficult just to simply get his phone number. Riku at the same time tries to reach Mina but not without obstacles.
12	"An Exciting Night" "Tokimeki no Yoru" (ときめきの夜)	December 19, 2006
A rumor has been going around that a ghost appears at night at the church on school grounds and before long the school is closed at night, making it even harder for the students working to prepare for the upcoming cultural festival to finish their jobs. Ultimately it is discovered that a large black sphere with one large red eye has been terrorizing the school. Meanwhile, a mysterious young lady shows up at school, who turns out to be a magical goddess.
13	"An Exciting Secret" "Tokimeki no Himitsu" (ときめきの秘密)	December 26, 2006
The cultural festival is only one month away and things are not going well for Riku's class. Class 2-A has not decided on their main theme and both boys and girls are fighting each other over creative differences. Riku is worried of Sayuri being overworked with abundant paperwork, being surrounded by other students with different issues, and lacking help from other students. At the same time, Riku is coerced again by the drama club's teacher. Only this time, she wants Sayuri to audition a play for the festival and have Riku to ask Sayuri for her answer. Meanwhile, Sayuri shows Riku her "secret place" as a hideaway from every day school work.
14	"An Exciting Transfer Student" "Tokimeki no Tenkousei" (ときめきの転校生)	January 9, 2007
A pretty blonde haired girl transfers to Tsumugi Private High School. Excitement sparks when it is learned that she is the popular teen magazine model Yukari Higashino, and more so, when she turns out to be Riku's childhood friend. Riku however says otherwise of their "happy" childhood together. Mina and Tsukasa don't take Yukari's advances to Riku well and decide to challenge her. The twist is that Yukari chooses Sayuri as her partner in the challenges.
15	"An Exciting Reality" "Tokimeki no Genjitsu (Utsutsu)" (ときめきの現実[うつつ])	January 16, 2007
Class 2-A's homeroom teacher Haruka Wakatake is feeling down from various problems, such as believing herself not to be that good a teacher, not being as "perfect" as Sayuri Amamiya, and still being single, just as her twenty-seventh birthday is approaching. Her hopes begin to rise when she meets a nice new friend in an online video game she plays on a daily basis.
16	"An Exciting Moment" "Tokimeki no Shunkan" (ときめきの瞬間)	January 23, 2007
In this episode, Riku Aoba has been placed in charge of his class' cultural festival project, a haunted house, but building the house is a huge task, so he asks the science teacher for help. When the class sees the tent, however, they're surprised to see it has taken up a space as big as the school, and they don't have enough decorations for it. To make up for this, Riku asks the Goddess of the Furnace to summon real ghosts (harmless, yet mischievous) for the tent. At the same time Sayuri notices Riku's new popularity and feels slightly jealous.
17	"An Exciting Cultural Festival" "Tokimeki no Bunka Sai" (ときめきの文化祭)	January 30, 2007
It is the day of the culture festival, and Riku hopes to watch Sayuri's performance at the play, but his hopes are dashed when his priorities for the Cultural Festival take over. Tsukasa and Mina try to cheer him up around campus by trying out all the games and activities the festival has to offer, but things are aggravated by their own rivalry with each other over Riku's affections. Meanwhile, Sayuri tries to find Riku to apologize for lashing out at him the previous day for being jealous of his newfound popularity.
18	"An Exciting Field Trip" "Tokimeki no Shuugakuryokou" (ときめきの修学旅行)	February 6, 2007
All of the second year students go to a field trip in Hokkaido. Tsukasa during the trip is sick and tries to hold it back in order to spend time with Riku. After fainting in front of Riku, he rushes her to the hospital. Meanwhile, Mina is unable to contact Riku with her mobile phone due to him not checking his phone and taking care of Tsukasa. During this time, Riku ignores Sayuri when he believes that both her and Sakurai are in a relationship thus complicating his own feelings.
19	"An Exciting Message" "Tokimeki no Dengon (Messeeji)" (ときめきの伝言[メッセージ])	February 13, 2007
While Riku, his class, and the rest of the sophomores are away in Hokkaido, Mina starts to feel lonely from not seeing Riku. When her text messages to Riku go unanswered, she begins to fall into a depression. Meanwhile, Riku still believes that Sayuri and Sakurai are in a relationship and continues to ignore her. After returning home, Riku finally checks his phone revealing the numerous emails/texts and a heartbreaking voice message from Mina.
20	"An Exciting Feeling" "Tokimeki no Omoi" (ときめきの想い)	February 20, 2007
After finally realizing Mina's and Tsukasa's feelings for him, Riku does not know how to respond. He also deals with his feelings for Sayuri and if he should still keep them. Unfamiliar with the situation, he falls into a depression. After bumping into Inukai, who gives him some advice, he finally cheers up and gives Mina and Tsukasa his response, which they seem content with for now.
21	"An Exciting Christmas" "Tokimeki no Seiya (Kurismasu)" (ときめきの聖夜[クリスマス])	February 27, 2007
It is Christmas time and Sakurai has planned another Student Council event, requiring participants to form couples, one guy and one girl each, as well as having a random exchange of Christmas gifts. As many guys vie for Sayuri, Ayame teases her about choosing Riku, which Sayuri denies. To spice things up, Ayame chooses Riku for herself in the event, much to everyone's surprise and to Tsukasa's and Mina's dismay. Secretly, Sayuri picks a present for Riku, while Tsukasa and Mina excitedly pick theirs for him as well.
22	"An Exciting New Year" "Tokimeki no Shinnen" (ときめきの新年)	March 6, 2007
It is learned that Riku will be spending the New Year's at home alone. Hoping to spend time with him, Sayuri, Tsukasa, and Mina decide to drop by at his house, each of them not aware they are planning the same thing.
23	"An Exciting Present" "Tokimeki no Okurimono (Puresento)" (ときめきの贈り物 [プレセント])	March 13, 2007
It is Valentine's Day, and, by Japanese custom, girls will be giving chocolates to the guys they like. While all the guys are hoping to get chocolates from girls they like, it is learned that Sayuri has never given any chocolate to any guy on Valentine's Day her whole life. Sayuri decides to finally give her first Valentine's Chocolate, to Riku, just as Tsukasa and Mina prepare theirs for him as well, but everything comes crashing down when Riku reveals the bad news: he is transferring to a new school.
24	"An Exciting Farewell" "Tokimeki no Wakare" (ときめきの別れ)	March 20, 2007
It turns out Riku is transferring out of Tsugumi High School due to his father's work, just like he had to transfer schools a number of times before for the same reason. The whole class decides to throw a going away party for him, but Sayuri is still disappointed that she was unable to give her chocolate to Riku and his planned departure aggravates her despair. Tsukasa and Mina are just as depressed by this news. All three girls hope before Riku leaves he will tell them how he feels about them.
25	"An Exciting Wish" "Tokimeki no Negai" (ときめきの願い)	March 27, 2007
The last day of school has come and Riku is leaving, but Sayuri does not want things to end the way they are. Sakurai helps her by having Riku and the male students participate in a hasty final event. The students must catch Riku before he reaches Sayuri and if they do they receive the homemade chocolate that she made for Riku. With a plead from Sayuri and a little help from his friends (including Hiyoko), Riku reaches Sayuri. She confesses her true feelings to him and Riku (with a little push from Inukai once more) accepts by asking her number/email in front of all of their classmates.

== Theme songs ==
=== Opening theme ===
- Yokan (予感, lit. Premonition)
  - Lyricist: Chihiro Kurosu
  - Composition: Takuya Watanabe
  - Arrangement: m-takeshi
  - Performance: Yuki Makishima

=== Ending themes ===
- Kiseki no Kakera (奇跡のかけら, lit. Fragments of a Miracle; episodes 1~16)
  - Lyricist: Akiko Watanabe
  - Composition: Kazuya Komatsu
  - Arrangement: Ryosuke Nakanishi
  - Performance: Yuki Makishima, Yukako Yoshikawa and Saki Fujita
- Himitsu (秘密, lit. Secret; episodes 17~24)
  - Lyricist: Chihiro Kurosu
  - Composition: Takeshi Uehara
  - Arrangement: Hiroshi Matsui
  - Performance: Yuki Makishima, Yukako Yoshikawa and Saki Fujita
