= Tokimeki Memorial Girl's Side: 4th Heart =

2021 video game

- Developer: Konami
- Publisher: Konami
- Platform: Nintendo Switch
- Release: JP: October 28, 2021
- Genre: Dating sim

Tokimeki Memorial Girl's Side: 4th Heart is a 2021 otome dating sim game developed and published by Konami for the Nintendo Switch. It is the eighth main game in Tokimeki Memorial series and the fourth game in the Tokimeki Memorial Girl's Side spin-off series. The player controls a female protagonist aiming to win the affection of a male character. The game received post-launch downloadable content, including new characters and in-game events.

== Gameplay ==
Tokimeki Memorial Girl's Side: 4th Heart is a dating sim game. Gameplay resolves around the player selecting activities, such as exercise and personal grooming, that raise or lower the protagonist's stats, with the aim of making her more desirable to the player's chosen male partner. The player must also invite the male characters on dates in order to raise their affection. The player can make other choices about the protagonist's lifestyle such as her choice of school club (including the student council or rhythmic gymnastics), and selecting her outfit: these actions also impact her stats and relationships with the male characters. The game also features various mini-games, such as sports and making chocolates for the male leads.
