= Tokimeki Memorial Girl's Side: 3rd Story =

2010 video game

- Developer(s): Konami
- Publisher(s): Konami
- Series: Tokimeki Memorial
- Platform(s): Nintendo DS, PlayStation Portable, Nintendo Switch
- Release: JP: June 24, 2010 (DS); JP: March 15, 2012 (PSP); JP: February 14, 2024 (Switch)
- Genre(s): Dating sim
- Mode(s): Single-player

Tokimeki Memorial Girl's Side: 3rd Story is the 2010 sequel to Tokimeki Memorial Girl's Side: 2nd Kiss and the seventh main game in Konami's Tokimeki Memorial dating sim series. An enhanced port to the PlayStation Portable featuring additional content and titled Tokimeki Memorial Girl's Side Premium ~3rd Story~ was released in 2012. A remaster of the Nintendo DS version was released in 2024 to the Nintendo Switch eShop. This game was the first game in the Tokimeki Memorial Girl's Side sub-series to be released on PSP.

== Game features ==
The game features all the additions that were made to the first two games in their DS versions, but adds new features like the 3P mode, where the main character can date two of the boys at the same time or the Pride vs Pride mode, where two boys in 3P mode will fight over the main character. The Premium version added a new character, Tatsuya, renewed graphics with a 2D animation system, and the "Boys' Life" mode, where the player can watch super-deformed versions of the main male characters interact with their bedrooms. This is also the first Girl's Side game where there isn't Rival Mode.

== Game content ==
The main character is a student at Habataki High School, the same school as the first game, but it has recently changed buildings and uniforms (the game starts around the time the second game's protagonist graduates). While leading a normal high school life including academics, club activities and part-time work, it is also possible to become friendly with boys who can make a declaration of love on graduation day.

=== Legend ===
The legend of this game is that primroses are blessed by the fairies and that if the players make a wish, the primroses make it true. This story is told by a young boy to the protagonist as a young girl in the primrose garden next to the church (now abandoned) that was the confessing spot of the first game, while they are playing hide and seek with the young boy's brother. In her first day at school, the main character remembers that the two boys were the Sakurai brothers. There are also references to the church legend to the first game, and if the player pursues Tatsuya's route in Premium, the mermaid legend from the second game is also mentioned.
