= Tokimeki Memorial (video game) =

1994 video game

- Cover of the original PC Engine CD version
- Developer: Konami
- Publisher: Konami
- Director: Yoshiaki Nagata
- Producer: Tomikazu Kirita
- Designer: Ryūga Tateishi
- Programmer: Asuty S.
- Artist: Masashi Kokura
- Writer: Koji Igarashi
- Composers: Mikio Saito; Seiya Murai; Miki Higashino; Hiro Noguchi
- Series: Tokimeki Memorial
- Platforms: PC Engine Super CD-ROM², PlayStation, Super Famicom, Sega Saturn, Windows, Game Boy Color, mobile phones, PlayStation Portable, Nintendo Switch
- Release: May 27, 1994: PC Engine Super CD-ROM²; JP: May 27, 1994 PlayStation; JP: October 13, 1995 Super Famicom; JP: February 29, 1996 Sega Saturn; JP: July 19, 1996 Windows; JP: December 3, 1997 Game Boy Color; JP: February 11, 1999 Mobile phones; JP: December 8, 2004 PlayStation Portable; JP: March 9, 2006 Nintendo Switch; JP: May 8, 2025
- Genre: Dating sim
- Mode: Single-player

Tokimeki Memorial (Note: Japanese: ときめきメモリアル; Tokimeki Memoriaru lit. Heartbeat Memorial) is a dating sim video game developed and published by Konami. The first game in the Tokimeki Memorial series, it was first released for the PC Engine's Super CD-ROM² System on May 27, 1994. It was directed by Yoshiaki Nagata, with Koji Igarashi working on scenario writing. It later received ports to the PlayStation in 1995, Sega Saturn and Super Famicom in 1996, Windows 95 in 1997, Game Boy Color in 1999, mobile phones in 2004, PlayStation Portable in 2006, and Nintendo Switch in 2025.

The game is considered one of the major titles in the dating sim genre, and eschews the sexual content of other games in the genre.

== Gameplay ==
Screenshot of the original PC Engine game showing the statistics integral to the gameplay

Tokimeki Memorial is a dating sim game in which the player controls a male freshman from Kirameki High School. The game is particularly notable for its "bomb" feature, where neglected, infrequently-dated girls would eventually become angry and gossip to their friends, severely reducing love meters across the board. In the middle of the game, when the number of known girls is high, these "bombs" became the primary concern of the player, forcing careful planning and strategies like round-robin dating. Although the feature was still present in the later games, these games considerably reduced its importance and the difficulty in avoiding it. Players pick options as responses when prompted by the characters in the game.

In Tokimeki Memorial, you are given twelve icons on the left side of the screen to choose from. Each of these icons represents a command which the player can perform. The icons are divided into six rows of two.

Book icon 文系学習 Bunkei gakushū Mainly increases the humanities parameter.	Test tube icon 理系学習 Rikei gakushū Mainly increases the science parameter.
Art icon 芸術系学習 Geijutsu-kei gakushū Mainly increases the arts parameter.	Dumbbell icon 運動 Undō Mainly increases the exercise parameter.
School building icon 部活 Bukatsu Joining/leaving clubs and club activities. The change in parameters differs depending on each of the 11 club activities.	Icon with two people 遊び Asobi Mainly increases the trivia (general knowledge) parameter.
Icon with one person looking at their reflection in a mirror おしゃれ Oshare Mainly increases the appearance parameter.	Icon with one person sleeping 休養 Kyūyō Physical condition recovers, and stress decreases.
Phone icon 電話 Denwa ♂ When calling Yoshio Saotome: Hear the girls' reputation / opinion of you (7 stages); Hear information about the girls(Phone numbers, club activities, etc.); Hear information about date spots, etc.; ♀ When calling a girl: Make a date appointment with a girl.; Fix a girl's mood.	Heart icon デート Dēto Go on a date. (Can only be selected during holiday command input.)
Icon with one person holding up a magnifying glass 情報 Jōhō Look at the information magazine. (Can only be selected during holiday command input. Can be used in combination with other commands.)	Super Famicom icon システム Shisutemu Settings can be changed.

== Development ==
The dating simulator genre was preceded by the raising simulation genre best codified by the Princess Maker series by Gainax, which focused on child raising rather than dating.

Writer Koji Igarashi says when he was tasked with writing the story for the game, he got assistance from his girlfriend at the time, who would later become his wife. She gave him advice on how to write the story to the game, while he would play Castlevania: Rondo of Blood, the game she was working on at the time. Igarashi requested to not work on a sequel to the game, and instead was allowed to request to work on the next Castlevania game instead.

The goal of the developers was to hearken back to high school days. Konami director Akihiko Nagata said "the person who created the game wanted to have experiences like this back in his high school days".

== Release and promotion ==
In an overview of the series in 1998, Gamejin (Note: げーむじん; lit. Gamer) magazine said that pre-release response to the game was one of shock and surprise. This was due to the fact that dating games were considered to be poor quality while Konami was known for making "hardcore" games like Gradius. Secondly, there was a general prejudice against bishōjo-styled games leading people to dismiss the game without trying it.

Tokimeki Memorial was first released on May 27, 1994 for the PC Engine.

Tokimeki Memorial: Forever With You was released on October 13, 1995 for the PlayStation. This version was released as a limited-edition version initially, until it received a large amount of pre-orders. The game became specifically more popular after the release of the PlayStation version.

The game was ported to the Super Famicom as Tokimeki Memorial: Densetsu no Ki no Shita de (Note: ときめきメモリアル 伝説の樹の下で; lit. Tokimeki Memorial: Beneath the Tree of Legend) for Super Famicom on February 29, 1996. This version was reduced in graphic and sound quality with the only voice clips being made available during loading, included an exclusive CD with a radio drama and new arrangement of the ending theme, "Futari no Toki", this time sung by the majority of the girls, instead of just Shiori Fujisaki. A fan translation of this version into English was released in March 2022. It was released for the Sega Saturn on July 19, 1996.

Tokimeki Memorial: Forever With You was released on December 3, 1997 for Windows 95-based personal computers (PCs). Like other games ported to Windows 95-based PCs, such as Virtua Fighter and Resident Evil, Tokimeki Memorial did not perform well financially, as the userbase for Windows 95 were not in the habit of playing games on their computers.

In 1999, the game was ported again to the Game Boy Color in two versions, Tokimeki Memorial Sports Version: Kotei no Photograph and Tokimeki Memorial Culture Version: Komorebi no Melody, dividing 10 of the characters between the two games and adding three new winnable characters, Patricia McGrath, Naomi Munakata, and Kyoko Izumi. The Game Boy Color versions also featured a Beatmania mini-game, compatibility with the Super Game Boy, a screen saver mode, and a two-player versus minigame. The game received a sequel the same year.

A mobile game version of Tokimeki Memorial for the i-mode was released in 2004 for mobile phones in Japan, and in 2006, was ported to the PlayStation Portable portable system, which is virtually identical to the PlayStation version. In 2009, the PlayStation version of Tokimeki Memorial: Forever With You was released on the Japanese PlayStation Store to celebrate the franchise's 15th anniversary. The PlayStation version was remastered for Nintendo Switch as Tokimeki Memorial: Forever With You Emotional in 2025.

In 2017, the mobile game Tokimeki Idol was released.

== Reception ==
Reception

Review scores
Publication	Score
Dengeki PC-Engine	(PCE) 95/100, 90/100, 95/100, 90/100 (Note: Each of the four reviewers in Dengeki PC-Engine scored the game on a 100 point scale)
Dengeki PlayStation	(PS) 95/100, 95/100, 90/100, 90/100
Weekly Famitsu	(PCE) 7/10, 7/10, 7/10, 6/10 (PS) 8/10, 8/10, 7/10, 9/10 (Note: Each of the four reviewers in Famitsu scored the game on a ten point scale) (SS) 7/10, 8/10, 8/10, 8/10

In an early review in Dengeki PC-Engine, the reviewer Keima Iwasaki said the game may appear to be a simple "raising game", noting the huge amount of events, large amount of varied mini-games and the depth of the gameplay. Three of the four reviewers in Dengeki PC-Engine called it the best release of the month with the reviewers praising its control, depth in gameplay. One reviewer commented how they lost track of time playing it while another said the only drawback was the length of time it took to save the players progress in the game.

Reviewing the release for the PlayStation, the four reviewers of Weekly Famitsu complimented the game's addictive qualities and subtle changes in how the characters react to the player. One reviewer complimented the larger amount of events and improved graphics in this version, saying that whether or not the player likes the anime illustrations, they are well-made.

== Legacy ==
Tokimeki Memorial sold 1.1 million copies by 1996. It spawned a series of over fifty games, counting also remakes and spin-offs.

Tokimeki Memorial popularized dating sims in Japan and the use of social statistics-raising mechanics in games for following decades.

The game, a classic of the dating sim genre, was voted as the 23rd favorite video game of all-time in a 2006 reader poll by Japanese magazine Famitsu. The game became more well-known in English-speaking communities after a video essay by Tim Rogers gained attention, and a fan translation of the Super Famicom port was published.
