= Tokimeki Memorial =

Video game series

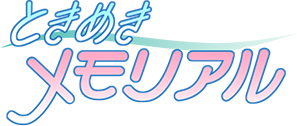
- Genres: Dating sim, social simulation
- Developer: Konami
- Publisher: Konami
- First release: Tokimeki Memorial; 1994
- Latest release: Tokimeki Memorial Girl's Side: 4th Heart; 2021

Tokimeki Memorial (Japanese: ときめきメモリアル, Hepburn: Tokimeki Memoriaru; lit. "Heartbeat Memorial") is a dating simulation series by Konami. It consists of eight main games in addition to many spin-offs. The games are notable in the dating sim genre for being highly nonlinear. Their nickname amongst their fans is the contraction TokiMemo.

The gameplay in Tokimeki Memorial focuses on scheduling, dating, and stat-building. The player has limited time to allocate between asking out members of the opposite sex and developing the playable character's abilities at school and sport (with the long-term goal of becoming more seductive, not out of any intrinsic value). Dates are frequent but very brief, with usually only one multiple-choice question to determine whether the partner's love meter will increase or decrease. One playthrough lasts for a fixed period of three years of high school (on the order of 5–10 hours of play), at the end of which the character with the highest love meter confesses their love.

== Game list ==
=== Main series ===
Original title	First release	Platforms
Tokimeki Memorial	1994	PC Engine, PlayStation, Sega Saturn, Super Famicom, Windows, Game Boy Color, Mobile phones, PlayStation Portable, Nintendo Switch
Tokimeki Memorial 2	1999	PlayStation, Mobile phones
Tokimeki Memorial 3: Yakusoku no Ano Basho de	2001	PlayStation 2
Tokimeki Memorial 4	2009	PlayStation Portable, Mobile phones

=== Girl's Side series ===
Original title	First release	Platforms
Tokimeki Memorial Girl's Side	2002	PlayStation 2, Nintendo DS, Nintendo Switch
Tokimeki Memorial Girl's Side: 2nd Kiss	2006	PlayStation 2, Nintendo DS, Nintendo Switch
Tokimeki Memorial Girl's Side: 3rd Story	2010	Nintendo DS, PlayStation Portable, Nintendo Switch
Tokimeki Memorial Girl's Side: 4th Heart	2021	Nintendo Switch

=== Spin-off games ===
Original title	First release	Platforms
Tokimeki Memorial Taisen Puzzle-dama	1995	Arcade, Windows, PlayStation, Sega Saturn
Tokimeki Memoriaru Private Collection	1996	PlayStation
Tokimeki Memorial Oshiete Your Heart	1997	Arcade, PC
Tokimeki Memorial Taisen Tokkae Dama	1997	PlayStation, Sega Saturn
Tokimeki Memorial Selection: Fujisaki Shiori	1997	PlayStation, Sega Saturn
Tokimeki Memorial Drama Series Vol. 1: Nijiiro no Seishun	1997	PlayStation, Sega Saturn
Tokimeki Memorial Drama Series Vol. 2: Irodori no Love Song	1998	PlayStation, Sega Saturn
Tokimeki no Hōkago	1998	PlayStation
Tokimeki Memorial Drama Series Vol. 3: Tabidachi no Uta	1999	PlayStation, Sega Saturn
Tokimeki Memorial 2 Substories: Dancing Summer Vacation	2000	PlayStation
Tokimeki Memorial 2 Taisen Puzzle Dama	2001	PlayStation
Tokimeki Memorial 2 Substories Vol. 2: Leaping School Festival	2001	PlayStation
Tokimeki Memorial 2 Substories Vol. 3: Memories Ringing On	2001	PlayStation
Shiori Jan	2001	Mobile phones
Tokimeki Memorial 2: Music Video Clips—Circus de Ai Imashō	2002	PlayStation 2
Tokimeki Memorial Typing	2003	PC, Macintosh
Tokimeki Memorial 2 Typing	2003	PC
Tokimeki 2 Shotto	2003	Mobile phones
Tokimeki Memorial LIVE	2003	Mobile phones
Tokimeki Memorial Girl's Side 1st Love Typing	2004	PC
Tokimeki Memorial Girl's Side Taisen Puzzle-Dama	2004	Mobile phones
Tokimeki Factory Vol.1: Tokimeki Memorial Girl's Side	2005	PC
Tokimeki Factory Vol.2: Tokimeki Memorial Girl's Side	2005	PC
Tokimeki Memorial Online	2006	PC
Tokimeki Factory: Tokimeki Memorial 2	2006	PC
Tokimeki Memorial Girl's Side 2nd Kiss Typing	2007	PC
Tokimeki Memorial OnlyLove ~ Tokimeki no Partner ~	2007	Mobile phones
Tokimeki Memorial Girl's Side -Love Stories-	2008	Mobile phones
Tokimeki Memorial Mail Drama	2008	Mobile phones
iW Toki Memo	2009	Mobile phones
Tokimeki Memorial Girl's Side 2nd Season: Novell Communications	2009	Mobile phones
Tokimeki Memorial Girl's Side Mobile	2010	Mobile phones
Tokimeki Memorial 4: Communication Comic	2010	Mobile phones
Tokimeki Memorial 4 Chu!	2010	Mobile phones
Tokimeki Memorial 4: Communication Comic	2010	Mobile phones
Tokimeki Restaurant	2013	iOS, Android
Tokimeki Memorial Girl's Side Battery Widget	2014	iOS, Android
Tokimeki Idol	2018	iOS, Android

== Related media ==
=== Manga ===
- Tokimeki Memorial (Konami Parody Comics)

ときめきメモリアル
- Manga
- Published by: Konami
- Original run: March 10, 1998 – present
- Volumes: 2

- Tokimeki Memorial ONLINE: Comic Anthology for Girls

ときめきメモリアルONLINE アンソロジーコミック for Girls
- Manga
- Published by: B's-LOG COMIC
- Original run: July 2006 – present
- Volumes: 21

- Tokimeki Memorial: Only Love

ときめきメモリアル Only Love
- Manga
- Written by: IZUMI; Makoto; KONAMI; Konami Digital Entertainment; SETA Kaito
- Published by: Media Works
- Magazine: Dengeki Comic Gao!
- Original run: May 27, 2006 – July 27, 2007
- Volumes: 2

- Tokimeki Memorial 4: Stand by Me

ときめきメモリアル4
- Manga
- Written by: Pairan
- Published by: ASCII Media Works
- Published: 2010
- Volumes: 3

Several manga based on the series have been released:

- Tokimeki Memorial (ときめきメモリアル) is a manga based on the first game, was released on March 10, 1998, and is part of Konami Parody Comics.
- Tokimeki Memorial ONLINE: Comic Anthology for Girls (ときめきメモリアルONLINE アンソロジーコミック for Girls) is a manga based on the game of same name, was released for manga on July 1, 2006, in Japan and published by B's-LOG COMIC.
- Tokimeki Memorial ONLINE: Tokimeki Gakuen Dai Panikku (・ときめきメモリアルONLINE －ときめき学園☆大パニック－) is a three digital comics based on the video game Tokimeki Memorial Online. It was released for Digital Mobiles Mangas in February 2008 in Japan only. It is part of Konami Weekly Magazine.
- Tokimeki Memorial Girl's Side: The Sleeping Beauty (・ときめきメモリアルGirl's Side －The Sleeping Beauty－) is a digital comic based on the game Tokimeki Memorial Girl's Side. It was released for Digital Mobile Manga on March 29, 2008, in Japan, and is part of Konami Weekly Magazine.

=== Anime ===
- Tokimeki Memorial

ときめきメモリアル (Tokimeki Memoriaru)
- Genre: Harem
- Original video animation
- Directed by: Hajime Kamegaki
- Produced by: Kōji Ikeda; Kōichi Mikami
- Written by: Yōsuke Kuroda
- Music by: Yuzo Hayashi
- Studio: Studio Pierrot
- Released: June 17, 1999 – October 8, 1999
- Runtime: 51-52 minutes
- Episodes: 2

In 1999, a two-episode anime OVA based on the first game was produced by Studio Pierrot.

In 2006, Tokimeki Memorial Online was adapted into a 25-episode anime television series, Tokimeki Memorial Only Love, produced by Konami Digital Entertainment Co., Ltd. and Anime International Company (AIC), which premiered across Japan on October 2, 2006.

In 2009, an OVA adaptation of Tokimeki Memorial 4 called Hajimari no Finder, directed by Hanyuu Naoyasu, was produced by Asahi Production.

=== Live-action film ===
Tokimeki Memorial is a live-action film loosely inspired by Konami's long running dating simulator franchise of the same name. It was released on August 9, 1997, and was distributed by Toei. It is the final film produced for Fuji TV's "Our movie series".

== Spin-offs and merchandise ==
Tokimeki Memorial spin-offs and merchandise include:

- Numerous related video games:
  - Two puzzle games based on the first game: Tokimeki Memorial Taisen Puzzle-dama (released in arcades, for Windows 95, PlayStation, and Sega Saturn) and Tokimeki Memorial Taisen Tokkae Dama (released for the PlayStation and Sega Saturn. The former was released on the PlayStation Store in January 2010.
  - One puzzle game based on the second game: Tokimeki Memorial 2 Puzzle Dama (released for the PlayStation).
  - The Tokimeki Memorial 2 Substories series, consisting of three games (each game focuses on three of the girls from Tokimemo 2 with the exception of the last game which focuses on four girls). The games are highly regarded for the mini-games in each game. The first game in the series, Dancing Summer Vacation focuses on Miyuki Kotobuki, Kaori Yae and the series' first (and so far, only) set of twins, Miho & Maho Shirayuki. The mini-game for this game revolves around one of Konami's other famous game series, Dance Dance Revolution using remixed Tokimeki Memorial 1 and 2 songs. The second game ("Leaping School Festival") focuses on Ichimonji Akane, Akai Homura and Ijuuin Mei. Unlike the other two Substories games there are three mini games in this game (one for each girl). The final game in the series, "Memories Ringing On" focuses on Hikari Hinomoto, Kasumi Asou, Kotoko Minazuki and Kaedeko Sakura. There are two mini-games in this game (Bowling and Billiards). Most girls appear in each game and can also be won but the characters that are not at the center of the game do not get as much story as the main heroines of the corresponding game.
  - Tokimeki Memorial 2 Music Video Clips: Circus de Aimashou ("Let's Meet At The Circus") was released on the PlayStation 2. The game concentrates on 5 girls from the Tokimeki Memorial 2 game (the girls being Sumire Nozaki, Hikari Hinomoto, Kasumi Asou, Kaori Yae, Homura Akai and Mei Ijuuin). Essentially being a collection of mini-games revolving around Sumire, players are able to choose one of the aforementioned girls before competing in the mini-games and if they play through and win the mini-games they are treated to an animated music video set to one of the chosen girl's image songs.
  - Tokimeki Memorial Private Collection (for the PlayStation), features a mini-game where the player pick one of the girls from Tokimemo 1 as a partner and she asks questions based on TokiMemo 1 (the questions would revolve around the girl—i.e.: her birthday, phone number, favorite items etc.). If the users correctly answer ten questions they are able to go to the beach with her and see her in her outfit.
  - Tokimeki no Houkago, a quiz game for the PlayStation where the players pick one of the other female characters from Tokimemo 1 as own partner and try to win her. Unlike the Private Collection game this game contains questions on general real life topics (and not the actual Tokimeki series) of the time (sport, manga, books etc.). This is the only time in the game's series (for Tokimeki Memorial 1–3) where the players can also win with a male character. They can pick Yoshio Saotome (the info otaku where they get all the information on the girls) as own partner. There is an ending with him where is possible both make a promise to each other to find a girlfriend. Essentially this is like the "Bad Ending" from Tokimemo 1 only with pictures added. Also this game expands on the endings from Tokimemo 1 somewhat in that the players get to see pictures of them (with some slight animation) corresponding to their endings. For example, Ayako Katagiri wants to go to Paris to go to an art school. Her ending involves the players seeing her off at the airport (accompanied by a picture).
  - Tokimeki Memorial Selection—Fujisaki Shiori is a game devoted to Shiori Fujisaki, the main heroine from Tokimemo 1. There is not much gameplay involved, as the game consists of an image gallery, two animated music videos and a mini game where the players can play Rock, Paper, Scissors with Shiori.
  - A series of three romantic drama/adventure games, or visual novels, were also released for the PlayStation and the Sega Saturn, each one focusing on a specific girl from TokiMemo 1. The first was Nijiiro no Seishun ("Rainbow-colored Youth"), featuring Saki Nijino, who cheers the player on as the latter spends the game trying to make it on the school soccer team's main line up. The second game, Irodori no Love Song ("The Many Hues of a Love Song"), focused on Katagiri Ayako with the player trying to compose a new song in time to win the school festival's band contest. The third and final drama game was Tabidachi no Uta ("Poem of Journeys") and featured both Shiori Fujisaki and Miharu Tatebayashi sharing a similar story about the player running a marathon just before graduation that branches off into different directions depending on which girl the players choose to pursue. The Drama series was developed by Hideo Kojima (of Metal Gear fame).
  - A music game Tokimeki Idol was released for iOS and Android in early 2018.
- Several Konami crossover games have included characters from the series:
  - The 2006 mobile phone game Konami Wai Wai Sokoban features Shiori Fujisaki as a playable character.
  - Bombergirl and Mahjong Fight Girl features Shiori Fujisaki as a playable character.
  - Super Bomberman R includes Shiori Fujisaki Bomber and Ayako Katagiri Bomber as playable characters.
  - Konami Pixel Puzzle Collection, a mobile picross game, includes a category called "School Girls" which features 38 puzzles of the characters and elements of the games.
- In episode #13 of GameCenter CX (known as "Retro Game Master" outside Japan), Shinya Arino, the host of the show, played through the PlayStation version of the game and successfully cleared it.

== See also ==
- Akari Uchida, a game designer who directed and/or produced multiple titles in the Tokimeki Memorial series.
- LovePlus, a similar dating sim series also from Konami and Akari Uchida.
