= Anri Shiono =

Japanese voice actress

- 塩野 アンリ
- Born: Yukako Yoshikawa; May 2 Chiba Prefecture, Japan
- Occupation: Voice actress
- Years active: 2003–2011
- Agent: 81 Produce

Anri Shiono (塩野 アンリ, Shiono Anri, born Yukako Yoshikawa (吉川 友佳子, Yoshikawa Yukako)) is a former Japanese voice actress who was affiliated with 81 Produce.

== Filmography ==
=== Anime ===
- Gunslinger Girl: Il Teatrino (Rico)
- Penguin Musume Heart (Hunting Maria)
- Tokimeki Memorial Only Love (Tsukasa Kasuga)

=== Video games ===
- Grand Chase (Elesis Sieghart)
- Virtua Fighter 5 (Eileen)

=== Drama CD ===
- Shiritsu Sairyou Koukou Chounouryokubu (Horii)

== Miscellaneous ==
- Tokimeki Memorial Only Love (ED song performance (with Saki Fujita and Yuki Makishima))
