= Tokimeki Memorial 2 =

1999 video game

- Original cover art
- Developer: KCET
- Publisher: Konami
- Composers: Mikio Saito; Atsushi Sato; Hana Hashikawa; Sayaka Yamaoka; Norikazu Miura
- Series: Tokimeki Memorial
- Platforms: PlayStation, mobile phones
- Release: PlayStation: JP: November 25, 1999
- Genre: Dating sim
- Mode: Single-player

Tokimeki Memorial 2 (ときめきメモリアル2, Tokimeki Memoriaru Tsū) is a dating sim developed and published by Konami and the second game in the Tokimeki Memorial series.

Tokimeki Memorial 2 was released for the PlayStation in 1999. It came on 5 CDs, featuring unmatched graphics and voice acting and a groundbreaking "Emotional Voice System (EVS)" where the girls could pronounce the player's name. Only Hikari Hinamoto and Kasumi Asou have the ability to use the EVS system in the actual game. All the other girls' EVS data came on CDs that were free in the Tokimeki Memorial 2 magazine "Hibikino Watcher". Each of the first three magazines came with a CD which had three of the girl's data on it per CD (the chosen girls on the CDs were also the three girls on the corresponding magazine cover). All the girls from the game have EVS data with the exception of Maeka Kudanshita, who always refers to the main player as "Shounen" (Japanese for young lad). The game itself was a big hit in Japan. Its gameplay followed the same template as the first, but with a lesser emphasis on the bombs and a greater emphasis on solving unique challenges specific to each girl. As a result, a different strategy had to be devised for every playthrough.

The game and EVS Append Disc was released in Japan for the PlayStation Store on November 25, 2009, exactly ten years after the game's original release date.

== Reception ==
Reception

Review scores
Publication	Score
Dengeki PlayStation	90/100, 85/100, 85/100, 85/100
Famitsu	9/10, 7/10, 9/10, 8/10

Tokimeki Memorial 2 was released in Japan for the PlayStation on November 25, 1999. The game sold 370,000 copies within six months.

== Board game ==
A board game based on the video game, Tokimeki Memorial 2: Game of Life (Jinsei Game), was published by Takara on February 11, 2000 in Japan.
