= Dating sim =

Video game subgenre of simulation games

Dating sims, also known as dating simulation games, are a video game subgenre of simulation games with romantic elements. While resembling the visual novel genre in presentation, dating sims can utilize an additional statistical and time management layer in their gameplay, as well as additional elements such as mini-games or combat. The player may be given a specific amount of time on an in-game calendar, while scheduling dates, correctly answering questions, and performing various activities will increase a certain character's attraction to the player until the player gains their love. Some dating sims are a form of eroge, and include sexually graphic cutscenes. The idea that love can only be earned through time and attention has prompted concern that it oversimplifies romance and depicts a "nice guy" view that may lead to unrealistic expectations from women.

Dating sims, typically in the form of bishōjo games with a male protagonist and female supporting characters, are extremely popular in Japan, taking up a large fraction of the software market, but far less prominent elsewhere. In Western gaming media, the "dating sim" label is often given to any game with romanceable characters, regardless of their gameplay. Parodic dating sims are a more recent phenomenon, poking fun at the genre by allowing the player to date unusual characters, such as realistic but sentient birds in Hatoful Boyfriend.

== History ==
The dating simulator genre was preceded by the raising simulation genre best codified by the Princess Maker series by Gainax, which focused on child raising rather than dating. Other games such as Sega's Girl's Garden (1985) and JAST's Tenshitachi no Gogo (1985) include elements of dating sims, though they have more adventure/arcade gameplay.

One of the first games exclusively centered on dating was Nakayama Miho no Tokimeki High School (1987) released for the Famicom Disk System, about a boy trying to date a girl at his high school who looks like pop idol Miho Nakayama. Unlike more modern dating sims, the game's plot is progressed through text choices, and as such plays more like graphical text adventures of the time (similar to games such as Famicom Detective Club.)

The first game which set the standard for the dating sim genre was Dōkyūsei (1992), which relied more on timed events than dialogue choices. Tokimeki Memorial (1994) truly popularized dating sims in Japan, in which the player, a high school student has the ability to date a dozen different girls. The goal of the developers was to hearken back to high school days. Konami director Akihiko Nagata said "the person who created the game wanted to have experiences like this back in his high school days". The game was a strong hit in Japan, with 1.1 million copies by 1996.

In general, simulation games (such as Tokimeki Memorial) or the train sim like Densha de Go! were more popular in Japan than in America which preferred more action oriented video games.

Games such as Sakura Wars and Persona (both series started in 1996, the latter would add dating sim elements in 2006) are RPGs with dating sim elements.

== Characteristics ==
Screenshot from the original PC Engine version of Tokimeki Memorial illustrating the complex system of statistics standard of the genre

In a typical dating sim, the gameplay involves conversing with a selection of characters, attempting to increase their internal "love meter" through correct choices of dialogue. The game lasts for a fixed period of game time, such as one month or three years. When the game ends, the player either loses the game by failing to properly win over any of the characters, or "finishes" often by having sex, marrying, and/or achieving eternal love. This gives the games more replay value, since the player can focus on a different character each time, trying to get a different ending.

Dating sims often revolve almost entirely around relationship-building, usually featuring complex character interactions and branching dialogue trees, and often presenting the player's possible responses word-for-word as the player character would say them. Dating sims such as Tokimeki Memorial, and some role-playing games with similar relationship based mechanics to the genre such as Persona, often give choices that have a different number of associated "mood points" which influence a player character's relationship and future conversations with a non-player character. These games often feature a day-night cycle with a time scheduling system that provides context and relevance to character interactions, allowing players to choose when and if to interact with certain characters, which in turn influences their responses during later conversations.

Historically, bishōjo games made up the bulk of dating sims, but other types of games have grown in popularity. Games where the player character is female and potential objects of affection are male are known as GxB or otome games. Homosexual relationships are also possible, as there are games with no specific gender lines ("all pairings"). There are also girls' love games, which focus on female/female relationships, and boys' love games, which focus on male/male pairings.

There are many variations on this theme: high-school romances are the most common, but a dating sim may also take place in a fantasy setting and involve such challenges as defending one's girl from monsters.

One game series that often includes dating, with the goal of marriage, is the farm life sim series Harvest Moon. The subplot of dating is more focused towards choosing one of several girls or guys (dependent on the player character's gender) and offering them presents or joining them on events in the game. The Star Ocean series of RPGs also feature dating sim elements in a similar manner.

Some Japanese dating sims may allow the player to have romantic or sexual relationships with characters in their teens. The degree of sexual content varies, but may often include intercourse. Sexually explicit dating sims may fall into the category of H Game or Eroge. Eroge only gets released to PC because large Japanese game companies do not want to release games with sexual content on their game consoles. Because of this, Eroge companies make a censored all-ages (15+) version of the PC version for various consoles. Censored versions often contain additional endings and added scenes to compensate for the absence of sexual scenes.

These games also often involve raising stats that reflect the player's skills and can be combined with other genres. Series such as Sakura Wars and Persona combine role-playing game (RPG) gameplay with dating sim gameplay.

== Examples ==
- Girl's Garden (1985)
- Tenshitachi no Gogo (1985)
- Nakayama Miho no Tokimeki High School (1987)
- Dōkyūsei series (1992 onwards)
- Tokimeki Memorial series (1994 onwards)
- True Love (1995)
- Sakura Wars series (1996 onwards)
- Thousand Arms (1998)
- Persona series (2006 onwards)
- Summer Session (2008)
- Amagami (2009)
- Love Plus (2009)
- Conception (2012 onwards)
- Hatoful Boyfriend (2012 onwards)
- Boyfriend Maker (2012)
- Mystic Messenger (2016)
- House Party (2017)
- Dream Daddy: A Dad Dating Simulator (2017)
- Monster Prom (2018)
- I Love You, Colonel Sanders! (2019)
- Boyfriend Dungeon (2021)
- Eternights (2023)
- Date Everything! (2025)

== See also ==
- Bishōjo game
- Eroge
- Harem (genre)
