= Virtual influencer =

Computer generated character used for social media marketing

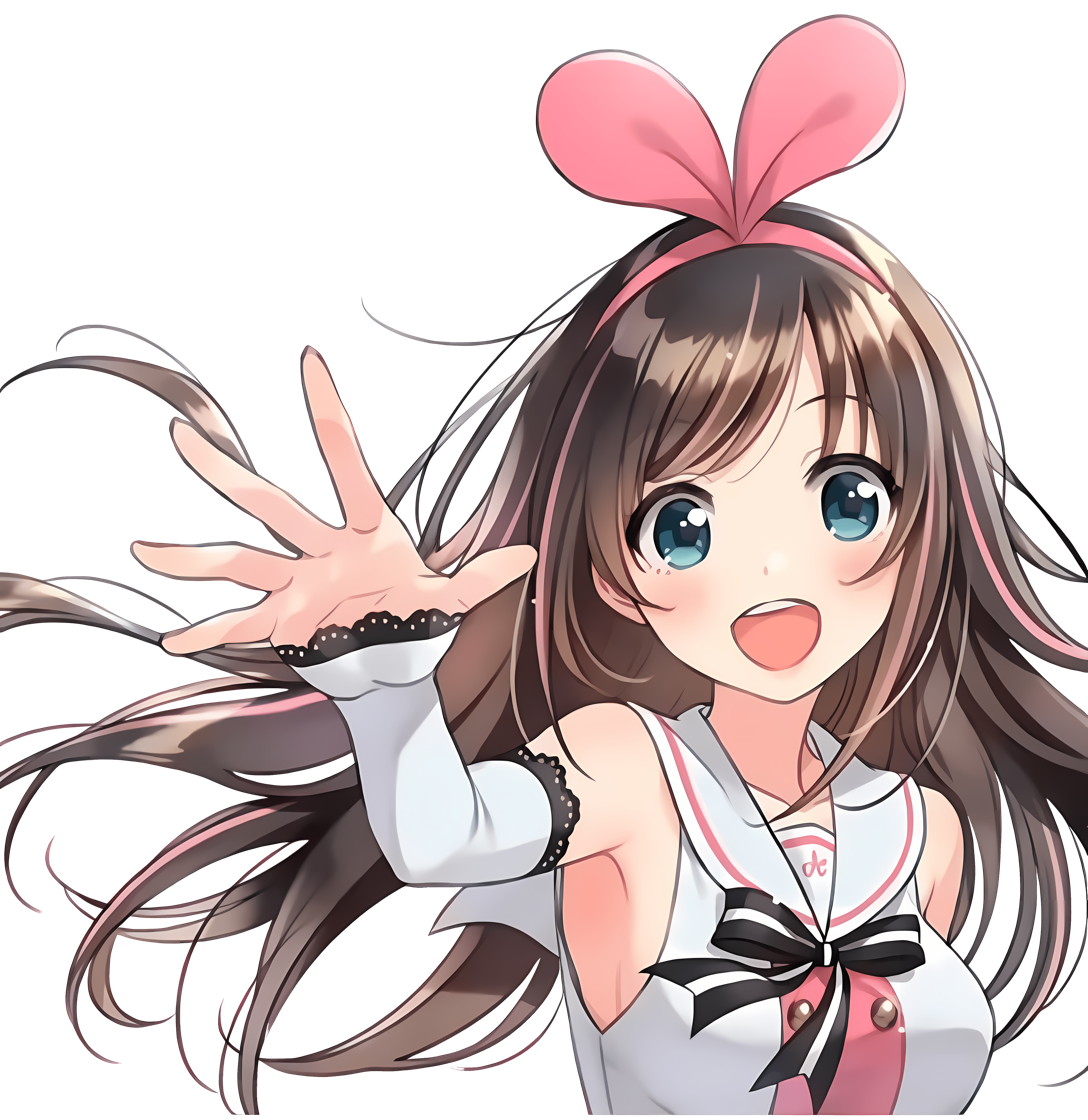
A representation of Kizuna AI, a Japanese virtual YouTube host, or VTuber for short

A virtual influencer, sometimes described as a virtual persona or virtual model, is a computer-generated fictional character that can be used for a variety of marketing-related purposes, but most frequently for social media marketing, in lieu of online human "influencers". Most virtual influencers are designed using computer graphics and motion capture technology to resemble real people in realistic situations. Common derivatives of virtual influencers include VTubers, which broadly refer to online entertainers in streaming media who represent themselves using virtual avatars instead of their physical selves.

== History ==
Virtual influencers are fundamentally synonymous with virtual idols, which originate from Japan's anime and Japanese idol culture that dates back to the 1980s. The first virtual idol created was Lynn Minmay, a fictional singer and main character of the anime television series Super Dimension Fortress Macross (1982) and the animated film adaptation Macross: Do You Remember Love? (1984). Minmay's success led to the production of more Japanese virtual idols, such as EVE from the Japanese cyberpunk anime Megazone 23 (1985), and Sharon Apple in Macross Plus (1994). Virtual idols were not always well received – in 1995, Japanese talent agency Horipro created Kyoko Date, which was inspired by the Macross franchise and dating sim games such as Tokimeki Memorial (1994). Date failed to gain commercial success despite drawing headlines for her debut as a CGI idol, largely due to technical limitations leading to issues such as unnatural movements, an issue also known as the uncanny valley.

Since their inception, many virtual idols created have achieved continual success, with notable names including the Vocaloid singer Hatsune Miku, and the VTuber Kizuna AI. Technological advancements have also enabled production teams to use artificial intelligence and advanced techniques to customize the personalities and behavior of virtual idols. Due to modern-day advancements in technology, many virtual idols have held real-life tours and events. Notable ones include Hatsune Miku's titular tour Miku Expo and Hololive's concerts with many of their idols from their English, Japanese and Indonesian branches.

Some notable events including virtual singers and influencers have included: Hatsune Miku opening for Lady Gaga in 2014 and Hoshimachi Suisei's concerts at the famous Budokan venue in Japan and her addition to the Forbes Japan list of '30 Under 30' individuals who are changing the world in their respective fields.

== Benefits and criticism ==
From a branding perspective, virtual influencers are perceived to be much less likely to be mired in scandals. In China, celebrities caught in bad publicity such as singer Wang Leehom and entertainer Kris Wu have heightened the appeal of virtual influencers, since their existence relies entirely on computer-generated imagery and they are therefore unlikely to cause any damage to a brand's image by association. Some studies have also suggested that Generation Z consumers have a unique appetite for virtual idols and influencers, since they grew up in the age of the internet. Studies also show that human-like appearance of virtual influencers show higher message credibility than anime-like virtual influencers.

Scholars and commentators have also questioned the ethics and cultural impact of virtual influencers, arguing that computer-generated personas can entrench unrealistic beauty standards while diffusing accountability for labor, identity, and consent. Business and marketing analysts have also warned that disclosure and governance remain inconsistent, recommending clearer guardrails and transparency when brands deploy synthetic spokespeople. In 2025, reporting highlighted concerns that AI-driven "virtual humans" could displace human creators and sales workers, intensifying debates over the future of creative labor and authenticity online.

== Notable examples ==
=== Virtual bands ===
- Eternity - A South Korean virtual idol group formed by Pulse9.
- Gorillaz - A virtual band formed in 1998.
- K/DA - A virtual K-pop girl group created as part of the League of Legends video game franchise.
- MAVE: - A South Korean virtual girl group formed in 2023 by Metaverse Entertainment.
- Pentakill - A virtual heavy metal band created as part of the League of Legends video game franchise.
- Plave - A South Korean virtual boy band formed by VLast.
- Squid Sisters and Off the Hook - Two virtual pop idol duos as part of the Splatoon series.
- Studio Killers - A Finnish-Danish-British virtual band formed in 2011.

=== Vocaloids ===
- Hatsune Miku (modeled after Saki Fujita)
- Kagamine Rin/Len (modeled after Asami Shimoda)
- Megurine Luka (modeled after Yū Asakawa)
- Meiko (modeled after Meiko Haigō)
- Kaito (modeled after Naoto Fūga)

=== VTubers ===
- Kano
- Kizuna AI
- Neuro-sama
- Ironmouse
- Projekt Melody
- Nijisanji
- Hololive
  - Akai Haato
  - Gawr Gura
  - Hoshimachi Suisei
  - Natsuiro Matsuri

=== Other examples ===
- Ami Yamato
- Crazy Frog
- FN Meka
- IA
- Kuki AI
- Kyoko Date
- Kyra
- Miquela
- Naevis
- Shudu Gram

== See also ==
- Avatar (computing)
- CGI
- Content creation
- Internet celebrity
- Uncanny valley
- Virtual actor
- Virtual band
- Virtual character
- Virtual human
