= Rei (given name) =

- Gender: Both

Origin
- Origin: Japanese
- Meaning: Different meanings depending on the kanji used

Rei is both a Japanese given name and a Hebrew given name.

In Japanese it could have different meanings depending on the used kanji and can be used for (or by) either gender.

In Hebrew, the name Rei (רעי Re`eeY) originates in biblical texts which mean "my shepherd; my companion; my friend". In the Hebrew Bible, Rei is an Israelite loyal to King David at the time of the usurpation of Adonijah, who remained firm to David's cause when Adonijah rebelled.

== Possible Japanese writings ==
- 麗, "lovely, graceful, beautiful"
- 霊, "spirit, ghost, departed soul"
- 例, "example, custom, usage, usual"
- 零, "zero"
- 玲, "exquisite, clever, sound of jewels"
- 令, "rule, order, command"
- 礼, "etiquette, bow, gratitude"
- 怜, "wise"
- 鈴, "small bell"
- 嶺, "peak, summit, mountain top"
- 黎, "black, dark, many"
- 澪, "water route, shipping canal"
- 励, "encourage, inspire"
- 伶, "actor"
- 苓, "plant, herb, mushroom"
- 禮, "manners, social custom, honor"
- 齢, "age"
- 冷, "cool, chill"
- 蛎, "oyster"
- 砺, "whetstone, polish"
- 戻, "return, resume, go backwards"
- 蠣, "oyster"
- レイ, Rei written in katakana
- れい, Rei written in hiragana

== People with the name ==
- Rei Dan (檀れい, born 1971), actress
- Ray Fujita (藤田玲, born 1988), actor
- Rei Hanagata (born 1990), Japanese manga artist and a manga script writer
- Rei Harakami (原神 玲; 1970–2011), Japanese record producer
- Rei Higuchi (樋口 黎; born 1996), Japanese freestyle wrestler
- Rei Hirakawa (平川 怜; born 2000), Japanese professional footballer
- Rei Hiroe (広江 礼威, born 1972), manga artist
- Rei Ieizumi (家泉 怜依; born 2000), Japanese footballer
- Rei Igarashi (大濱 貴子, born 1963), actress and voice actress
- Rei Jimbo (神保 れい; born 1974), Japanese former synchronized swimmer
- Rei Kawakubo (川久保 玲, born 1942), fashion designer, founder of Comme des Garçons
- Rei Kihara Osaki (1918–2006), Japanese American female lawyer
- Rei Kikukawa (菊川 怜, born 1978), actress, model and television presenter
- Rei Matsumoto (松本 怜; born 1988), Japanese football player
- Rei Matsuzaki (松嵜 麗; born 1985), Japanese voice actress
- Rei Mikamoto (三家本 礼, born 1974), horror manga artist
- Rei Naito (内藤 礼; born 1961), Japanese artist
- Rei Nakanishi (なかにし 礼; 1938–2020), Japanese novelist and songwriter
- Rei Nakashima (中島 怜; born 2004), Japanese singer
- Rei Nishiyama (西山 麗; born 1984), Japanese softball player
- Rei Naoi (直井怜, born 2004), singer, rapper
- Rei Ohara (小原 怜; born 1990), Japanese long-distance runner
- Rei Okamoto (岡本玲, born 1991), model and actress
- Rei Omishi (臣士れい, born 19--), screenwriter and manga author/artist
- Rei Sakamoto (坂本 怜; born 2006), Japanese tennis player
- Rei Sakuma (佐久間 レイ, born 1965), voice actor
- Rei Sato (badminton) (佐藤 黎; born 1990), Japanese badminton player
- Rei Sato (motorcyclist) (佐藤 励; born 2000), Japanese motorcycle racer
- Rei Tachibana (橘 麗衣; born 1993), Japanese professional footballer
- Rei Tachikawa (立川 玲; born 1998), Japanese professional footballer
- Rei Takahashi (高橋 礼; born 1995), Japanese baseball player
- Rei Takedomi, Japanese shogi player
- Rei Takemura (竹村 令; born 1919), Japanese freestyle swimmer
- Rei Toda (戸田 れい; born 1987), Japanese gravure idol
- Rei Yasuda (安田 レイ; born 1993), Japanese singer and model
- Rei Yonezawa (米澤 令衣; born 1996), Japanese football player
- Rei Yoshii (吉井怜, born 1992), actress
- Rei Yuzuka (柚香 光; born 1992), Japanese actress

== Other people ==
- Rei Berroa (born 1949), Dominican-American poet, university professor, literary and cultural critic, and translator

== Fictional characters ==
- Rei, a character in the video game Breath of Fire III
- Rei (レイ), a character in the manga series Fist of the North Star
- Rei, a character from the game Nu: Carnival
- Rei, a character in the video game Ōkami
- Rei (玲), a character in the video game Persona Q: Shadow of the Labyrinth
- Rei (レイ), a character in the manga series Urusei Yatsura
- Rei Amayado (天谷奴 零), a character in the multimedia project Hypnosis Mic: Division Rap Battle
- Rei Ayanami (綾波 レイ), a character in the media franchise Neon Genesis Evangelion
- Rei Batsubami (×喰 零), a character in the manga/anime Kakegurui
- Rei Furuya (降谷 零), a character in the manga series Detective Conan
- Rei Hasekura (支倉 令), a character in the light novel series Maria-sama ga Miteru
- Rei Hino (火野 レイ), a character in the anime and manga series Sailor Moon
- Rei Hizuki (緋月 玲), a character in the anime series Sky Girls
- Rei Hōōmaru (鳳凰丸 礼), a character in the anime series Kill la Kill
- Rei Kaneda (金田れい), a character in the anime series Star Detective Precure!
- Rei Kashino (樫野 零), a character in the manga and drama series Mars
- Rei Katsura (桂 レイ), a character in the anime series Digimon Universe: Appli Monsters
- Rei Kibutsuji (鬼舞辻 麗), a character in the anime and manga series Demon Slayer: Kimetsu no Yaiba
- Rei Kiriyama (桐山 零), protagonist of the manga series March Comes in Like a Lion
- Rei Kiseijou (キセイジョウ・レイ) (Rei Ryghts), a character in the video game Hyperdimension Neptunia Victory
- Rei Kizaki (騎咲 レイ), a character in the anime series Aikatsu Stars!
- Rei Kohmyoji, a character in the OVA series Kikaider 01: The Animation
- Rei Kon (金 李), a character in the anime series Beyblade
- Rei Kuki (九鬼 麗), the main antagonist of the anime series Genji Tsuushin Agedama
- Rei Kuroki (黒騎 れい), a character in the anime series Vividred Operation
- Rei Kurosawa (黒澤 怜), a character in the video game series Fatal Frame
- Rei Membami, a character in the video game The Great Ace Attorney 2: Resolve
- Rei Miyamoto (宮本 麗), a character in the manga series Highschool of the Dead
- Rei Ogami (大神 零), a character in the anime and manga series Code:Breaker
- Rei Ryugazaki (竜ヶ崎 怜), a character in the anime series Free!
- Rei Sagami (相模 玲), a character in the anime and manga series Kodocha
- Rei Sagara (相楽 玲), a character in the anime and manga series Love Stage!!
- Rei Sakuma (朔間 零), a character from the rhythm game Ensemble Stars!
- Rei Saotome (早乙女 レイ), a character in the anime series Yu-Gi-Oh! GX
- Rei Shimizu (志水 礼), a character in the manga Danganronpa Gaiden: Killer Killer
- Rei Shimobe (下辺 零), a character in the video game Shuten Order
- Rei Shimura, a character in Sujata Massey's mystery novels
- Rei Shizuya (静矢 零) (Hugh O'Conner), a character in the video game Phoenix Wright: Ace Attorney - Dual Destinies
- Rei Suwa (諏訪 零), a character in the anime Buddy Daddies
- Rei Suzumura (涼邑 零), a character in the tokusatsu series Garo
- Rei Suzuya (鈴屋 玲), a character in the manga series Tokyo Ghoul
- Rei Tachibana (立花 レイ), a character in the tokusatsu series Kagaku Sentai Dynaman
- Rei Takashima (高島 麗), a character in the manga series Deadman Wonderland
- Rei Todoroki (轟 冷), a character in the manga series My Hero Academia
- Rei Toei, a character in William Gibson's Bridge trilogy
- Rei Wakana (和奏 レイ), a character in the media franchise BanG Dream!
- Rei Yozora (レイ・ヨゾラ), one of the main characters of the anime Shin Hakkenden
