= Virtual band =

Real musical group with fictional members

In entertainment, a virtual band (also called a virtual music group, cartoon band, animated band, or other variations) is a band composed of virtual performers (such as virtual singers or virtual idols) which are fictional characters or people depicted by virtual avatars. The music is produced by people, sometimes with the use of singing voice synthesis software. Media related to the virtual band, including albums, music videos and concerts, features the virtual performers; in many cases the virtual performers have been credited on the music.

The term virtual band was popularized with Gorillaz in 2000. However, the concept of the virtual band was first demonstrated by Alvin and the Chipmunks in 1958, when their creator, Ross Bagdasarian, pitch-scaled recordings of his own voice to achieve the "chipmunk voice". There have since been numerous virtual bands that have recorded material. Computer animation, traditional animation, and vocal mixing and manipulation are common features.

The term virtual idol originates from Japan, where it dates back to the 1980s and has roots in anime and Japanese idol culture. Popular virtual idols include the Vocaloid singer Hatsune Miku as well as virtual YouTubers, Kizuna AI and Hoshimachi Suisei. Kizuna AI was introduced as a character presented as a fully artificial intelligence and promoted as the world’s first "Virtual YouTuber", or "VTuber". In reality, her YouTube channel is operated by a professional production team.

The term is sometimes confused for music groups who collaborate using the Internet, who do not require members to be in the same physical place for their work.

== Members ==
The members of virtual groups are depicted as animated characters with their own personality, voice, history and playing style. For example, Alvin, the leader of the Chipmunks, is mischievous. Murdoc of Gorillaz is a middle-aged satanic bass player.

The style of animation used for depicting the characters varies. Some groups and idols are hand-drawn characters, and much of their media uses traditional animation and cartooning techniques. Others are computer-generated.

Some people consider puppetry as a form of animation; this consideration means groups like Dr. Teeth and the Electric Mayhem or 31 Minutes can be considered virtual bands.

== Production ==
=== In studio ===
The recording of the music is done by the human musicians and artists, whom the virtual artists are depicted to emulate. In some cases, the singing is done by machines or synthesizer applications, like the Hatsune Miku vocaloid. This is done using the normal in-studio recording process; see Sound recording for a detailed explanation.

In some instances, most notably The Chipmunks, manipulation of voices may be employed, either to achieve a desired vocal effect, or to make it dissimilar to the voice of the actual singer. The manipulation is done by either modifying the playback speed of the vocal track or by putting it through a synthesizer (Vocoding).

Writing and production credits may be assigned to either the virtual band characters, or the human writers and artists involved.

=== On stage ===
Virtual bands often perform through virtual concerts, where their likenesses are represented digitally on stage. One of two methods can be employed for live performances. The first involves animating the entire set, with little or no allowance for audience interaction, then "performing" it as is. The major pitfall with this method is the lack of audience interaction, which can be vital during concerts. This is best suited to short performances, where audience response can be predicted.

The second, and more complex, method differs from the first in that allowance is made for a variety of responses and interaction. This means having a wide range of animated sequences ready to play, with matching spoken lines, in response to different reactions.

In both cases, extensive rehearsal is required to synchronize spoken lines and instrumentation with animated action. This can be eliminated by using pre-recorded music and speech; however, doing so also weakens the actual "live" experience.

(Some non-virtual artists and groups have employed a similar technique on some concert tours and performances. DJ Shadow, for example, on his In Tune and On Time tour, had pre-animated sequences, which were played on giant screens behind him while he performed the set. Again, a large amount of pre-tour planning and synchronization rehearsal was required beforehand.)

== History ==
=== Early history ===
While the term had not been coined at the time, Alvin and the Chipmunks were the first virtual band to receive widespread fame. Centered on Alvin, his two brothers Simon and Theodore, and their manager/father Dave Seville, their voices were created by Ross Bagdasarian, Sr., who accelerated the recording of his voice to create the distinctive sound; the process earned him two Grammys in 1959 for engineering.

The success of the Chipmunks spurred on another group, the Nutty Squirrels, to join the ranks. A scat-singing version of Bagdasarian's creation, they made the American Top 40 with their song "Uh-Oh". Their success, however, was short-lived.

=== Television ===
In 1968, The Banana Splits premiered on NBC but failed to chart the top 40. A year later in 1969, from rival CBS, The Archies were the first virtual band to appear in worldwide pop charts.

During this time, other television programs, such as Josie and the Pussycats and The Muppet Show, began to include bands as part of the format (in the case of Josie and the Pussycats, the eponymous band was the show's focus). Some of the groups that appeared on these shows released mainstream recordings. Some bands, however, would "break up" after the end of the show's run.

After The Archies, produced by Filmation, became a huge pop hit, Hanna-Barbera started releasing several cartoon TV shows with the adventures of rock bands, such as Josie and the Pussycats, The Cattanooga Cats, The Impossibles, Butch Cassidy and the Sundance Kids, Jabberjaw, and others.

During the 1980s, Hasbro released Jem, an animated TV series featuring two enemy bands with a music video in each episode.

Virtual bands still appear in television: the Chipmunks appeared in their own television show for much of the 1990s, and the Adult Swim show Metalocalypse features the virtual melodic death metal band Dethklok.

=== Japanese virtual artists ===
Virtual idols originate from Japan, with roots in anime and Japanese idol culture, and dating back to the 1980s, starting with the Macross mecha anime franchise (adapted into the Robotech franchise in North America). The first virtual idol was Lynn Minmay, a fictional singer who is one of the main characters in the anime television series Super Dimension Fortress Macross (1982) and the animated film adaptation Macross: Do You Remember Love? (1984). Voiced by Mari Iijima, Lynn Minmay became the first fictional idol singer to garner major real-world success. The theme song "Do You Remember Love?" (from the film Macross: Do You Remember Love?) reached number seven on the Oricon music charts in Japan, and the song has since been covered numerous times over the next several decades.

The Japanese cyberpunk anime Megazone 23 (1985) took the virtual idol concept further with EVE, who is depicted as a computer-based artificial intelligence (AI) who takes the form of a virtual idol within a proto-Matrix-like virtual reality. Megazone 23 was a success in Japan partly due to the appeal of EVE, and it was later adapted into Robotech: The Movie (1986) in North America. A similar concept later appeared in Macross Plus (1994) with the virtual idol Sharon Apple, a computer program who takes the form of an intergalactic pop star. The same year, the fictional Japanese rock band Fire Bomber from Macross 7 (1994) became a commercial success, spawning multiple CDs released in Japan.

The Japanese talent agency Horipro created the first real-life AI virtual idol, Kyoko Date, in 1995. Her creation was inspired by the success of the Macross franchise and dating sim games such as Tokimeki Memorial (1994), along with advances in computer graphics. Her initial announcement drew headlines, both in Japan and internationally, before she debuted as a CGI idol in 1996. However, she failed to gain commercial success, largely due to technical limitations leading to issues such as unnatural movement (an issue known as the uncanny valley). Despite her failure, she provided the template for later virtual idols who gained commercial success in the early 21st century, such as the Vocaloid singer Hatsune Miku and the virtual YouTuber Kizuna AI.

In 2007, Crypton Future Media and Yamaha launched Vocaloid 2, with the voice bank of Hatsune Miku. In 2009, Hatsune Miku had her first concert. Other Vocaloids made by Crypton Future Media include Meiko, Kaito, Kagamine Rin and Len, and Megurine Luka.

Virtual bands can also originate from video games, as proven by the 2015 Wii U game Splatoon, which features songs credited to various virtual bands, the most notable being a pop duo called the Squid Sisters, who have performed several real world concerts as holograms. The game's 2017 Nintendo Switch sequel, Splatoon 2, introduces more virtual bands, most notably Off the Hook, a duo similar to the Squid Sisters. The two duos have performed together as holograms, and has had a special guest, K.K. Slider from the Animal Crossing series, to celebrate the release of Animal Crossing New Horizons. Prior to it, Nintendo had already made a virtual band composed of characters from Pikmin called Strawberry Flower, to promote the games. Their first single, Ai no Uta, was a massive success in Japan, reaching #2 on the Weekly Oricon Top 200 Singles chart. In 2020, Sega and Sanrio teamed up to make their first collaboration virtual band, Beatcats.

=== Western virtual artists ===
Gorillaz are an English virtual band created in 1998 by musician Damon Albarn and artist Jamie Hewlett, from London. The band primarily consists of four fictional members: 2-D (vocals, keyboards), Murdoc Niccals (bass guitar), Noodle (guitar, keyboards, vocals) and Russel Hobbs (drums). Their universe is presented in media such as music videos, interviews, comic strips and short cartoons. Gorillaz's music has featured collaborations with a wide range of featured artists, with Albarn as the only permanent musical contributor.

Prozzäk are a Canadian virtual pop music duo formed by Jay Levine and James Bryan McCollum in 1998. Their recordings and animated music videos tell the comedic tale of their frontmen, Simon (Levine) and Milo (McCollum), who are best friends on a search to find true love.

One-T are a French virtual band created in 2000 by Eddy Gronfier and Thomas Pieds. Eddy Gronfier produces the music while Thomas Pieds creates the artwork and visuals. They were successful across Europe, especially France and Germany, with their 2003 hit single "The Magic Key", but since then were not able to repeat that success and remained a one-hit wonder.

Dethklok is a fictional melodic death metal band featured in the Adult Swim animated television series Metalocalypse, known for its satirical or parodic lyrical themes.

The first official Dethklok album was released on September 25, 2007, entitled The Dethalbum. The album debuted at number 21 on Billboard magazine's Top 200 list.

Gummibär or Gummy Bear is a German Eurodance multilingual character and virtual musician that performs gummy bear-related songs on various albums, including I Am Your Gummy Bear (2007) and La La Love to Dance (2010). The video for the song "I'm a Gummy Bear" and its Spanish version has 3.2 billion and 1.2 billion views on YouTube respectively. Gummibär's popularity as a phenomenon is very similar to that of fellow European music phenomenon Crazy Frog, characterised by repetition of lyrics and singing of catchy melodies. Variants of the character's music have been released in various languages internationally.

K/DA is a virtual K-pop girl group consisting of four themed versions of League of Legends characters Ahri, Akali, Evelynn and Kai'Sa. (G)I-dle members Miyeon and Soyeon provide the voices of Ahri and Akali, respectively, Madison Beer voices Evelynn, and Jaira Burns provided the voice for Kai'Sa. However, the characters have also been voiced by other artists.

K/DA was developed by Riot Games, the company behind League of Legends, and was unveiled at the 2018 League of Legends World Championship with an augmented reality live performance of their debut single, "Pop/Stars". A music video of the song uploaded to YouTube subsequently went viral, surpassing 100 million views in one month, reaching 550 million views as of May 2023, and topping Billboard's World Digital Song Sales chart.

In 2019, Riot created a virtual hip hop group called True Damage, featuring the champions Ekko, Akali, Qiyana, Senna, and Yasuo. The vocalists performed a live version of their debut song, "Giants", during the opening ceremony of the 2019 League of Legends World Championship, alongside holographic versions of their characters.

Dvar is an anonymous virtual band from Russia that plays darkwave and electronic music.

Huntrix and Saja Boys, the fictional K-pop bands from the 2025 film KPop Demon Hunters, have been referred to as "virtual groups".

Atomic Youth are an English virtual band formed in 2016. The project blends progressive metal, folk rock, and chiptune, and is presented through illustrations and 3D renders of four fictional members.

=== Malaysian virtual band ===
In 2000, Malaysian pop band KRU created a short-lived virtual band called Tyco (meaning “big brother” in Cantonese) with members Norman, Yusry, and Edry as avatars Tylo, Yiko, and Psylo respectively. Tyco was also awarded “Malaysia’s First Virtual Artiste” by the Malaysian Book of Records.

=== Korean virtual artists ===
SeeU (Korean: 시유; RR: Siyu) is a female Korean vocal created for the Vocaloid 3 software by SBS A&T (formerly SBS Artech) and was the only Korean vocal released for that version of the software. As well as a Korean vocal, she possessed a Japanese vocal. The voice behind her is Dahee Kim from the band GLAM.

Eternity is a virtual idol group formed by Pulse9. The group debuted on March 22, 2021, with the single "I'm Real". The group consists of 11 members: Seoa, Sujin, Minji, Zae-in, Hyejin, Dain, Chorong, Jiwoo, Yeoreum, Sarang and Yejin. They are created with artificial intelligence technology, Deep Real.

Mave: is a virtual girl group formed in 2023 by Metaverse Entertainment. The group consists of Siu, Zena, Marty, and Tyra, who are hyper-realistic, AI-generated members that were created using machine learning, deep fake, and full 3D production technology.

naevis is a virtual idol developed by SM Entertainment. First appearing in 2020 as part of K-pop girl group Aespa's fictional universe, Naevis was launched as a soloist in 2024 with the single "Done".

== Market and industry ==
Recent empirical research shows that virtual idols have become a meaningful part of marketing and entertainment industries. A 2023 study described the boundaries, benefits, and risks of virtual-idol marketing and proposed an integrated working framework targeted at Generation Z consumers. Another study found that virtual-idol characteristics such as popularity, homogeneity, relevance and anthropomorphism positively influenced consumers’ willingness to purchase branded products.

== Reception and audience behavior ==
Fans of virtual idols engage in creative behaviour beyond passive viewership: a 2023 empirical study using the MOA (Motivation-Opportunity-Ability) theory found that interest motivation and achievement motivation significantly predicted fans’ creative participation in content for virtual idols. Scholars caution however that strong para-social attachments and unresolved identity “seams” between virtual and real performers may introduce risks for creators and audiences alike.

== See also ==
- Avatar (computing)
- Uncanny valley
- Virtual actor
- Virtual concert
- Virtual influencer
- Virtual YouTuber
- Vocaloid
