= T-Babe =

T-Babe, circa 2000

T-Babe (stylised as t-babe) was a virtual pop singer created by husband-and-wife team Sascha and Tessa Hartmann for their independent record label Glasgow Records. The couple were looking to sign an artist to sing the dance tunes that Sascha had written, but were unable to find anyone suitable. As a result, they decided instead to create a 3D computer-generated character who could perform the songs.

The Hartmanns developed T-Babe over the course of a year. Initially, her purpose was to attract further attention to the label from the rest of the music industry, but the couple soon began to treat the character as an artist in her own right. Tessa met with a number of focus groups to develop T-Babe's personality and to make the character relatable. She created a five-year timeline for T-Babe, including events such as when her hair would grow and when she would have boyfriend problems. It was decided that T-Babe would be 18 years old, single, lonely, fluent in German, Spanish, Italian and Japanese, and "a big fan of shopping [and] athletics". The T in her name stood for Saint Teresa, and her parents were a university professor and an ex-hippy. The singing voice for T-Babe was supplied by an American singer who chose to remain anonymous, as she was already an established singer.

T-Babe was first previewed in 2000 at the music festival Midem in Cannes, where Glasgow Records formed part of the British Phonographic Industry's stall. She gave her first TV interview in March 2000 with Matthew Price for the children's news programme Newsround. Her debut single, "Peter Pumpkineater", was originally slated for release that month, but was instead pushed back to September. In May of that year, T-Babe was featured in the magazine Vogue and was offered a contract with the fashion designer Louis Vuitton. She later appeared on the American Broadcasting Company's programme Good Morning America, and was also named "Most Beautiful New Pop Artist" by the Italian version of Cosmopolitan and "It Cyber Pin-up of the Year" by Entertainment Weekly. During this promotion, commentators compared T-Babe with similar computer-generated/animated characters of the time, such as Gorillaz, Lara Croft, Kyoko Date, Ananova and Germany's e-CYAS.

In May 2000, the Hartmanns launched Glasgow Animation, a sister company their record label that would develop T-Babe further. They sought to raise £5 million in private equity for the development, and hired Benfield Advisory from the City of London to assist in raising the funds. They received a £10 million offer from a public company, but turned it down. Silicon Graphics provided sponsorship to the company, and supplied graphics software used to develop the character.

"Peter Pumpkineater" was eventually released on 15 March 2001, but failed to make the UK's Top 100 chart. In January 2002, Alexis Petridis of The Guardian stated that T-Babe had sunk "without a trace".
