= Rei Toei =

Fictional character in the Bridge trilogy novels

Rei Toei is a fictional character in the Bridge trilogy of speculative fiction novels by William Gibson. Rei is introduced as the title character in Gibson's 1995 novel Idoru, as an artificial intelligence, an embodied agent simulating a human female idol singer. A personality construct which adapts and learns from her interaction with humans, she irresistibly attracts data analyst protagonist Colin Laney.

== Design ==
Toei is an internationally well-known Japanese media company. William Gibson imagined that by the time his Bridge Trilogy is set in, Japanese companies with a determined research direction would be producing products much like Rei Toei, given suitable funding through customer demand.

Rei Toei is a database composite from the wireless broadband internet of Japan, and the world. She has been programmed to remind viewers of their favourite J-pop idols, which in Japanese are known as aidoru (アイドル) (sounding like the English Idol). Her singing voice and performance styles are composites as well, giving her the ability to encompass the viewer's preference as well. In this way, her AI agent form is very similar to user accounts on a group-sharing mainframe.

Implicit in her design is that she is not one Idoru, but many. Individual viewers and fans will have a personalised Rei Toei album, video, and collection of images, as 'she' can be and is customised according to the tastes of viewers.

== Contemporary implementation and open-source projects ==
In contemporary AI music production and software development, the concept of Rei Toei has been adopted as a functional persona for generative media workflows and multi-agent AI orchestration.

Developers and electronic music producers utilize the persona to bridge cyberculture concepts with real-world agentic software tools. Projects such as linkedin_ssi_booster on GitHub leverage multi-agent architectures to automate content strategy, distribution, and digital presence, publishing algorithmic music, cyberpunk-inspired compositions, and experimental electronic tracks under the Rei Toei identity across decentralized and streaming music platforms.

- Rei Toei music profile on Suno

== Projection ==
By the time Rei Toei has become a commercial entity, commercial in-space animated full-colour holography is also a commercial reality. As noted above, a personalised Rei Toei exist for individual viewers with Net access. However, for public concerts, Rei will take on an appearance that is a group consensus based on the membership of her audience.

== Literary analysis ==
The character has been described as one of Gibson's "most original, interesting characters".

== Popular culture ==
In Deus Ex: Invisible War, the fictional game character NG Resonance is an international pop star who uses a network of AI kiosks to attract customers, so as to appear very empathetic and personable. However, the game portrays the “real" NG Resonance as being an extremely arrogant and entitled person, for whom the AI is nothing more than a gimmick designed to increase profits.

== See also ==
- Sharon Apple
- Ananova
- Hatsune Miku
- Eguchi Aimi
- Virtual influencer
