= Drama (Aespa EP) =

- Digital cover

EP by Aespa
- Released: November 10, 2023
- Genres: Hip hop; dance; acoustic pop
- Length: 19:11
- Language: Korean
- Labels: SM; Kakao; Warner

Aespa chronology
My World (2023)	Drama (2023)	Armageddon (2024)

Singles from Drama
- 1. "Drama" Released: November 10, 2023

Drama is the fourth extended play by South Korean girl group Aespa. It was released by SM Entertainment on November 10, 2023, and contains six tracks, including the lead single of the same name.

== Background and release ==
In February 2023, during their inaugural concert, Synk: Hyper Line, the group performed the then-unreleased songs: "Hot Air Balloon", "YOLO", and "Don't Blink". On October 10, SM Entertainment announced that the group would be releasing their fourth extended play titled Drama on November 10. An introduction teaser video was also released on the same day. Six days later, the promotional schedule was released. On October 30, the mood sample teaser video was released, followed by the highlight medley teaser video on November 3. On November 6, teaser videos inspired by the concept of television drama were released for Winter and Giselle, with Karina and Ningning's teasers following the next day. On November 9, the music video teaser for "Drama" was released. The extended play was released alongside the music video for "Drama" on November 10.

== Conception ==
According to SM Entertainment, Drama will showcase Aespa "evolving personalities" with "fresh music" while "also build[ing upon] a previous narrative thread" as the group is "now breaking out from the trauma caused by a series of events with 'Synk Out', and 'Hallucination Quest' [in the SMCU's storyline for Aespa]".

== Composition ==
The standard edition of Drama consists of six tracks of various genres, including hip hop, dance, and acoustic pop. As with the group's previous releases, Drama will "bring a new chapter to their SMCU lore" by writing stories through "unique music and visuals". The lead single "Drama" was described as a hip-hop and dance song characterized by "an aggressive drum sound and sophisticated synth bass" with lyrics about having "confident attitude that every story begins with Aespa". The second track "Trick or Trick" is a dance song with "heavy bass", and "a hypnotic charm". The third track "Don't Blink" is a "country-like" song with "rusty synth" focusing "Aespa's vocals". The fourth track, "Hot Air Balloon" has lyrics that "described a journey up into the sky with someone special". The fifth track "YOLO" is a pop-punk song with "mixture of pop and metal guitar". The sixth track "You" carries lyrics filled with "full of sincerity towards the [group's fans]". In the digital edition that features the group's previously released English single "Better Things" as a bonus track, stands out as an "up-tempo" dance song characterized by "rhythmic percussion sound" with lyrics about "shrugging off the past" while "focusing the given time on more valuable things".

== Commercial performance ==
Drama debuted at number three on South Korea's Circle Album Chart in the chart issue dated November 19–25, 2023. In Japan, the EP debuted at number 27 on the Billboard Japan Hot Albums in the chart issue dated November 15, 2023; on its component chart, the EP debuted at number 11 on the Top Download Albums. On the Oricon chart, the EP debuted at number 11 on the Albums Chart, and number ten on the Combined Albums Chart in the chart issue dated November 27, 2023.

In the United States, Drama debuted at number 33 on the Billboard 200, and number two on the Billboard World Albums in the chart issue dated November 25, 2023. In United Kingdom, the EP debuted at number ten on the OCC's UK Album Downloads Chart, number 33 on the UK Albums Sales, and number 45 on the UK Physical Albums in the chart issue dated November 17–23, 2023. In Australia, the EP debuted at number four on the ARIA Top 20 Hitseekers Albums Chart in the chart issue dated November 20, 2023. In France, the EP debuted at number 30 on the SNEP's Top Albums in the chart issue dated November 17, 2023. In Hungary, the EP debuted at number 19 on the MAHASZ Top Albums 40 Chart in the chart issue dated November 10–16, 2023. In Poland, the EP debuted at number 28 on the ZPAV's OLiS in chart issue dated November 10–16, 2023. In Scotland, the EP debuted at number 43 on the OCC's Scottish Albums Chart in the chart issue dated November 17–23, 2023. In Spain, the EP debuted at number 79 on the PROMUSICAE Top 100 Albums Chart in the chart issue dated November 10–16, 2023.

According to the International Federation of the Phonographic Industry (IFPI)'s Global Music Report for 2023, Drama was the twentieth best-selling album worldwide, having sold 1.5 million units. (Note: The IFPI Global Albums chart ranks, in order, the albums that generated the most money globally across streaming, download, and physical record sales (combined) in a calendar year. The Global Album Sales Chart measures global unit sales across all physical formats, as well as full album downloads.)

== Critical reception ==
Professional ratings
Review scores
Source	Rating
Clash	7/10

Abbie Aitken writing for Clash called Drama "a welcomed expansion to the Aespa universe [by] present[ing] the vocal prowess of [Aespa] and highlights their versatile musicality". She concluded that the "narrative got slightly muddled [by] the overall energy, especially from [the lead single], [making the listener] felt rousing [while] eager for more".

== Promotion ==
Before the release of Drama, on November 10, 2023, Aespa held a live event called "Aespa Drama Countdown Live" on YouTube, TikTok, Weverse, and Idol Plus, aimed at introducing the extended play and connecting with their fanbase. Additionally, the group launched a pop-up store named "Aespa Week? Drama City?" in Seoul, South Korea, running from November 10 to 26, to "commemorate the release of the extended play".

== Track listing ==
Drama – CD
No.	Title	Lyrics	Music	Arrangement	Length
1.	"Drama"	Bang Hye-hyun (JamFactory); Ellie Suh (153/Joombas)	No Identity; Waker (153/Joombas); Ejae; Charlotte Wilson	No Identity	3:35
2.	"Trick or Trick"	Kim Min-ji (JamFactory)	Kristin Langsrud; August Dagestad; Johanne Lid; Stian Nyhammer Olsen	Stian Nyhammer Olsen	2:55
3.	"Don't Blink"	Hwang Yu-bin (VeryGoods)	Dillon Deskin; Tima Dee; Deanna Villarreal	Dillon Deskin	2:49
4.	"Hot Air Balloon"	Jo Yoon-kyung	Moa "Cazzi Opeia" Carlebecker; Ellen Berg; Alysa; Nermin Harambasic; Stian Nyhammer Olsen	Stian Nyhammer Olsen; Alysa	3:19
5.	"YOLO"	Na Yun-jeong (Lalala Studio)	Albi Albertsson (Clarity-X); Anna Timgren	Albi Albertsson (Clarity-X)	3:09
6.	"You"	Lee O-neul	Jake K (Artiffect); Maria Marcus; MCK (Artiffect); St_Knox (Artiffect); Louise Frick Sveen	Jake K (Artiffect); MCK (Artiffect); St_Knox (Artiffect)	3:23
Total length:					19:11

Drama – Digital download / streaming
No.	Title	Lyrics	Music	Arrangement	Length
7.	"Better Things"	Leroy Clampitt; Rachel Keen	Leroy Clampitt; Rachel Keen	Leroy Clampitt; Rachel Keen	3:23
Total length:					22:34

== Credits and personnel ==
Credits adapted from the EP's liner notes in the physical edition, which excluded the track "Better Things".

Studio

- SM Yellow Tail Studio – recording, engineered for mix (track 1), digital editing (track 1, 5)
- SM Big Shot Studio – recording (track 1–3), engineered for mix (track 2), digital editing, mixing (track 3)
- SM SSAM Studio – recording (track 1, 6)
- SM LVYIN Studio – recording, engineered for mix, mixing (track 4), digital editing (track 6)
- Golden Bell Tree Sound – recording (track 4)
- SM Blue Cup Studio – recording, mixing (track 5)
- SM Starlight Studio – recording (track 6), digital editing, mixing (track 2)
- Seoul Studio – recording (track 6)
- SM Blue Ocean Studio – mixing (track 1, 6)
- 821 Sound – mastering (all tracks)

Personnel

- SM Entertainment – executive producer
- Park Sun-young – creative executive
- Lee Sung-soo – A&R executive
- Tak Young-jun – IP executive
- Jang Cheol-hyuk – executive supervisor
- Aespa – vocals, background vocals (all tracks)
- Bang Hye-hyun (JamFactory) – lyrics (track 1)
- Ellie Suh (153/Joombas) – lyrics (track 1)
- No Identity – producer, composition, arrangement, bass, keyboards, synthesizer, drum programming (track 1)
- Waker (153/Joombas) – composition, keyboards (track 1)
- Ejae – composition, background vocals (track 1)
- Charlotte Wilson – composition (track 1)
- Kim Min-ji (JamFactory) – lyrics (track 2)
- Kristin Langsrud – composition, background vocals (track 2)
- August Dagestad – composition (track 2)
- Johanne Lid – composition (track 2)
- Stian Nyhammer Olsen – producer, composition, arrangement (track 2, 4), background vocals (track 2)
- Hwang Yu-bin (VeryGoods) – lyrics (track 3)
- Dillon Deskin – producer, composition, arrangement (track 3)
- Tima Dee – composition (track 3)
- Deanna Villarreal – composition (track 3)
- Jo Yoon-kyung – lyrics (track 4)
- Moa "Cazzi Opeia" Carlebecker – composition (track 4)
- Ellen Berg – composition (track 4)
- Alysa – producer, composition, arrangement (track 4)
- Nermin Harambasic – composition (track 4)
- Na Yun-jeong (Lalala Studio) – lyrics (track 5)
- Albi Albertsson (Clarity-X) a.k.a. Mussashi – producer, composition, arrangement (track 5)
- Anna Timgren – composition, background vocals (track 5)
- Lee O-neul – lyrics (track 6)
- Jake K (Artiffect) – producer, composition, arrangement, vocal directing, bass, guitar, piano, synthesizer (track 6)
- Maria Marcus – composition, background vocals (track 6)
- MCK (Artiffect) – producer, composition, arrangement, guitar, piano, synthesizer (track 6)
- St_Knox (Artiffect) – producer, composition, arrangement, guitar, piano, synthesizer (track 6)
- Louise Frick Sveen – composition (track 6)
- Deez – vocal directing (track 1)
- Red Anne – vocal directing, background vocals (track 2)
- Kriz – vocal directing (track 3)
- MinGtion – vocal directing (track 4)
- Kim Jin-hwan – vocal directing (track 5)
- Kim Kwang-hoon – guitar (track 6)
- Nile Lee – strings conducting, strings arrangement (track 6)
- On The String – strings (track 6)
- Noh Min-ji – recording, engineered for mix (track 1), digital editing (track 1, 5)
- Lee Min-kyu – recording (track 1–3), engineered for mix (track 2), digital editing, mixing (track 3)
- Kang Eun-ji – recording (track 1, 6)
- Lee Ji-hong – recording, engineered for mix, mixing (track 4), digital editing (track 6)
- Kim Kwang-min – recording (track 4)
- Jung Eui-seok – recording, mixing (track 5)
- Jeong Yoo-ra – recording (track 6), digital editing, mixing (track 2)
- Jeong Ki-hong – recording (track 6)
- Choi Da-in – recording (track 6)
- Kang Sun-young – digital editing (track 1)
- Woo Min-jeong – digital editing (track 2)
- Jang Woo-young – digital editing (track 4)
- Kim Cheol-sun – mixing (track 1, 6)
- Kwon Nam-woo – mastering (all tracks)

== Charts ==
=== Weekly charts ===
Weekly chart performance for Drama
Chart (2023)	Peak position
Australian Hitseekers Albums (ARIA)	4
Croatian International Albums (HDU)	5
French Albums (SNEP)	30
Hungarian Albums (MAHASZ)	19
Japanese Albums (Oricon)	5
Japanese Combined Albums (Oricon)	5
Japanese Hot Albums (Billboard Japan)	5
Polish Albums (ZPAV)	28
Portuguese Albums (AFP)	5
South Korean Albums (Circle)	3
Scottish Albums (Official Charts)	43
Spanish Albums (PROMUSICAE)	79
UK Album Downloads (Official Charts)	10
UK Albums Sales (OCC)	33
UK Physical Albums (OCC)	45
US Billboard 200	33
US World Albums (Billboard)	2

=== Monthly charts ===
Monthly chart performance for Drama
Chart (2023)	Position
Japanese Albums (Oricon)	19
South Korean Albums (Circle)	5

=== Year-end charts ===
Year-end chart performance for Drama
Chart (2023)	Position
South Korean Albums (Circle)	25

== Certifications and sales ==
Certifications and sales for Drama
Region	Certification	Certified units/sales
South Korea (KMCA)	Million	1,000,000^{^}
Summaries
Worldwide (IFPI)	—	1,500,000
^{^} Shipments figures based on certification alone.

== Release history ==
Release history for Drama
Region	Date	Format	Label
South Korea	November 10, 2023	CD	SM; Kakao; Warner
Various	November 10, 2023	Digital download; streaming	SM; Kakao; Warner
