= Welcome to My World (Aespa song) =

Single by Aespa featuring Naevis

from the EP My World
- Language: Korean; English
- Released: May 2, 2023
- Genre: Alternative pop
- Length: 3:27
- Label: SM; Warner; Dreamus
- Composers: Mich Hansen; Jacob Uchorczak; Celine Svanbäck; Patrizia Helander
- Lyricists: Ellie Suh (153/Joombas); Hyun Ji-won; Danke (Lalala Studio)

Aespa singles chronology
"Hold on Tight" (2023)	"Welcome to My World" (2023)	"Spicy" (2023)

Music video
- "Welcome to My World" on YouTube

Professional ratings
Review scores
Source	Rating
IZM	3.5/5 stars

"Welcome to My World" is a song recorded by South Korean girl group Aespa featuring Naevis. Written by Ellie Suh, Hyun Ji-won, and Danke alongside Mich Hansen, Jacob "Ubizz" Uchorczak, Celine Svanbäck, and Patrizia Helander, it was released as a pre-release single for their third extended play My World by SM Entertainment on May 2, 2023.

== Background and release ==
On February 16, 2023, Lee Sung-soo released a 30-minute video stating: "Lee Soo-man was the reason why Aespa's music has been delayed" and that the group was supposed to release new music on February 20. Moreover, he added that Soo-man wanted to start "injecting environmentalist motifs of tree-planting and sustainability into songs" which were eventually later scrapped as they "did not fit the world of Aespa" and made the group "upset". On March 16, SM Entertainment announced that Aespa would be releasing a record in early May. On April 17, it was announced that the group's third extended play titled My World, and containing six tracks, would be released on May 8. It was also announced that "Welcome to My World" would be pre-released on May 2. On April 26, it was revealed that Naevis, the AI character in Aespa's SMCU storyline, would featured in "Welcome to My World" as a virtual artist. The song alongside its music video was released on May 2.

== Composition ==
"Welcome to My World" was written by Ellie Suh of 153/Joombas, Hyun Ji-won, and Danke of Lalala Studio, composed and arranged by Mich Hansen, and Jacob "Ubizz" Uchorczak with Celine Svanbäck, and Patrizia Helander participating in the composition. It was described as a "dreamy" and "majestic" pop and alternative pop song characterized by "guitar riff and orchestra" with lyrics about "inviting Naevis [and the listener] to the music world of Aespa". "Welcome to My World" was composed in the key of G major, with a tempo of 152 beats per minute.

== Music video ==
The music video portrays the members "taking a road trip to a forest and connect with nature" with "a mysterious aura [following] them [throughout] their journey", later revealed to be Naevis, "a personified AI system from the group's [world]".

== Commercial performance ==
"Welcome to My World" debuted at number 122 on South Korea's Circle Digital Chart in the chart issue dated April 30 – May 6, 2023. In the following week, it ascended to number 64. In Singapore, the song debuted at number 26 on the RIAS Top Regional Chart in the chart issue dated May 5–11, 2023. In Vietnam, the song debuted at number 27 on the Billboard Vietnam Hot 100 in the chart issue dated May 18, 2023.

== Critical reception ==
On NME's midyear list of the best K-pop songs of 2023, Abby Webster wrote that the song "set the tone with a perfected alchemy of hard and soft (or, in their parlance, salty and sweet)" and called it "a welcome oasis in their digital terrain".

Year-end lists for "Welcome to My World"
Critic/Publication	List	Rank	Ref.
Business Insider	The best K-pop songs of 2023	3	
Dazed	Top 50 best K-pop tracks of 2023	13	

== Credits and personnel ==
Credits adapted from EP's liner notes.

Studio

- SM Yellow Tail Studio – recording, digital editing
- Seoul Studio – recording
- SM Starlight Studio – digital editing
- Doobdoob Studio – digital editing
- SM Concert Hall Studio – mixing
- 821 Sound – mastering

Personnel

- SM Entertainment – executive producer
- Aespa – vocals, background vocals
- Ellie Suh (153/Joombas) – lyrics
- Danke (Lalala Studio) – lyrics
- Hyun Ji-won – lyrics
- Mich Hansen – composition, arrangement
- Jacob "Ubizz" Uchorczak – composition, arrangement
- Celine Svanbäck – composition
- Patrizia Helander – composition
- Kriz – vocal directing, background vocals
- Goldbranch – orchestral recording, orchestral arrangement, orchestral programming
- SM Classics Town Orchestra – orchestration
- Moon Jung-jae – piano, orchestral recording
- Lee Jong-han – orchestral programming
- Noh Min-ji – recording, digital editing
- Jeong Ki-hong – recording
- Choi Da-in – recording
- Lee Chan-mi – recording
- Jeong Yoo-ra – digital editing
- Jang Woo-young – digital editing
- Nam Koong-jin – mixing
- Kwon Nam-woo – mastering

== Charts ==
=== Weekly charts ===
Weekly chart performance for "Welcome to My World"
Chart (2023)	Peak position
Singapore Regional (RIAS)	26
South Korea (Circle)	64
Vietnam (Vietnam Hot 100)	63

=== Monthly charts ===
Monthly chart performance for "Welcome to My World"
Chart (2023)	Position
South Korea (Circle)	92

== Release history ==
Release history for "Welcome to My World"
Region	Date	Format	Label
Various	May 2, 2023	Digital download; streaming	SM; Warner; Dreamus
