= My World (Aespa EP) =

- Digital cover

EP by Aespa
- Released: May 8, 2023
- Length: 20:23
- Language: Korean
- Labels: SM; Warner; Dreamus

Aespa chronology
| Girls (2022) | My World (2023) | Drama (2023) |

Singles from My World
- 1. "Welcome to My World" Released: May 2, 2023; 2. "Spicy" Released: May 8, 2023

My World is the third extended play by South Korean girl group Aespa. It was released by SM Entertainment on May 8, 2023, and contains six tracks, including the pre-release single "Welcome to My World" featuring Naevis, and the lead single "Spicy" which reached the top three on the Circle Digital Chart. Compared to the dark, futuristic, hyperpop-influenced tones of Savage (2021) and Girls (2022), My World's brighter pop sound draws mostly from dance and R&B, with melodies characterized by "captivating beats" and "delightful" vocals of the group. The songs incorporate eclectic styles ranging from alternative pop and dream pop to synth-pop and ballad. Described by Aespa as a return to the "real world" from Kwangya, the EP shows a new side of the group across various genres.

The EP was met with generally favorable reviews from critics. Commercially, it debuted at number one on the Circle Album Chart with 1,420,178 copies sold in a week. The EP has since been certified double million by the Korea Music Content Association (KMCA). Following its physical release in the United States, My World became their second album to reach the top ten of Billboard 200.

== Background and release ==
On February 16, 2023, Lee Sung-soo released a 30-minute video stating: "Lee Soo-man was the reason why Aespa's music has been delayed" and that the group was supposed to release new music on February 20. Moreover, he added that Soo-man wanted to start "injecting environmentalist motifs of tree-planting and sustainability into songs" which were eventually later scrapped as they "did not fit the world of Aespa" and made the group "upset". On February 25 and 26, the group performed the then-unreleased songs "Salty & Sweet", "Thirsty", "I'm Unhappy" and "'Til We Meet Again" at their first concert, Synk: Hyper Line. On March 16, SM Entertainment announced that Aespa would be releasing a record in early May. During an interview for the March 2023 edition of Uproxx, member Giselle revealed that their upcoming music will be "a little different, while keeping [their] roots in the whole Aespa vibe" by "show[ing] a versatible version of [themselves]". She further elaborate that the songs would be "more sentimental with focus [mainly] on the music orientation, [in addition], to the performance".

On April 17, it was announced that the group's third extended play titled My World, containing six tracks, would be released on May 8. It was also announced that "Welcome to My World" would be pre-released on May 2. The EP would be available in four different versions with 11 different covers depending on the version, with pre-orders starting on the same day. A day later, the intro teaser video was released. On April 24, a "breaking news"-styled teaser video was released. On the same day, the track listing of 6 tracks was released via their official website with "Spicy" announced as the lead single. On April 26, it was revealed that Naevis, the AI character in Aespa's SMCU storyline, would be featured in "Welcome to My World" as a virtual artist. On May 2, "Welcome to My World" was released alongside its music video. The track video for "I'm Unhappy", "Salty & Sweet", and "Thirsty" was released, respectively, from May 2 to 4. On May 6, the music video teaser for lead single "Spicy" was released. The EP was released alongside the music video for "Spicy" on May 8.

== Conception ==
This album shows a new side of Aespa. We've mostly done dark and intense music so far because of our Kwangya story line, in which we fought with a villain called Black Mamba. But as we are back in the "real world", we wanted to focus on the ordinary teenage version of ourselves

— Karina, introducing My World at the press conference

Regarding the creative process and style for the songs, SM Entertainment revealed that My World "will continue to tell the group's sci-fi narrative" with the members "now traveling to the real world from Kwangya". Aespa used the "kitsch" and "urban" styles in their teasers and clothing during promotion of My World, departing from the dark, futuristic "cyberpunk" style and aesthetic of the previous albums Savage and Girls. In an article for Paper, Peyton Gatewood noted that the group "ditches the metaverse" and expands their story "beyond the pixelated, alien plain of previous albums into a more naturalistic terrain" with the group's Twitter account, stating that "Aespa is in the Real World!".

During the live event "Aespa 'My World' Countdown Live", Karina stated that "there is no villain in our real world". However, after Aespa invites Naevis to their real world in the track "Welcome to My World", "an anomaly' continues to occur there". She also revealed that "maybe [the group] will start another battle or go to another world" in their future release.

== Recording and development ==
In an online press conference in Seoul for the release of My World, Karina explained that "Spicy" was chosen to be the lead single, because the group first listened to it "a long time ago", but the song "was so good that she could not forget it". That is why she suggested to her company that "[they] should do the song again because now it's summer". The singer also revealed that "Welcome to My World" was initially supposed to be Naevis' track, but Aespa found the song "so good" after listening to it that the girls "asked if [they] could do it". She explained how the single was chosen to represent Aespa's identity: "So we told our company SM Entertainment that we can handle it well. That's how it became our song, we danced and filmed music videos with AI characters in the past, but this was our first time to sing with it. At first, I thought it would be somewhat awkward, but Naevis' sound blended so smoothly with all of us." In an interview with NME the group stated that with this EP "we get to show a wider range from us, ranging from powerful dance tracks to sweet R&B ballads".

== Composition ==
The opening track, "Welcome to My World", features Naevis from Aespa's SMCU storyline.

My World consists of six tracks and "features various genres, captivating beats, and delightful vocals". The first track and pre-release single "Welcome to My World", which features backing vocals by Naevis from Aespa's SMCU storyline, was described as a pop, dream pop and alternative pop song characterized by "guitar riff and orchestra" with lyrics about "inviting Naevis [and the listener] to the music world of Aespa". The second track and lead single "Spicy" was described as an "experimental" dance, pop and synth-pop song characterized by "intense synth-bass sound [and] dynamic beat rhythm". The third track "Salty & Sweet" was described as a "futuristic" dance and hyperpop song centered around "rough" industrial synth grinds and bass rhythm.

The fourth track "Thirsty" was described as a R&B and "modern pop" song with a "bubbly beat and vocal harmonies" that lyrically "expresses thirsty feelings" and compares a "heart that deepens endlessly towards the other person, to a wave". Abigail Firth of Dork described it as "the love child" of PC Music and Flo's "new-R&B" sound. In the fifth song "I'm Unhappy", the group uses the digital world as a metaphor for "feeling disconnected from those around them" and longing for "the real thing instead of social media's fake facades". The pop track features a "minimal" melody and "simple" production with "stripped-back plinky piano and rattling drums". The sixth and final track "'Til We Meet Again" was described as a "gentle" and "mesmerising" ballad song characterized by "string performance" and "acoustic guitar" with lyrics about "the love of Aespa members towards their fans, who are always connected through music".

== Promotion ==
Prior to the EP's release, on May 8, 2023, Aespa held a live event called "Aespa 'My World' Countdown Live" on YouTube, TikTok, and IdolPlus to introduce the album and communicate with their fans.

=== Visuals ===
Six videos—for "Welcome to My World", "I'm Unhappy", "Salty & Sweet", "Thirsty", "Spicy" and "'Til We Meet Again", were released on May 2, 3, 4, 8 and 29, 2023, respectively. The video for the pre-release single, "Welcome to My World", features Aespa "taking a road trip to a forest and connect with nature" with Naevis. The "sombre" track video for "I'm Unhappy" explores the teenage version of the group in a high school. The "Salty & Sweet" music video shows Aespa preside over a table filled with monstrous desserts. In the Y2K-inspired video for "Thirsty", the group stars in its own show and falls in love. The video for the lead single, "Spicy", features the members as "a group of popular high school students" that throw a "wild party" and explore the city. The "sentimental" "Til We Meet Again" video shows the tour footage of the song during Synk: Hyper Line concerts. It also includes footage of Aespa in Sydney and behind-the-scenes from My World various music video shoots.

=== Singles ===
"Welcome to My World" is the first single of My World. SM released the song for digital download and streaming on May 2, 2023. It peaked at number 64 on the Circle Digital Chart. The lead single "Spicy" was released on May 8, 2023, the same day the EP came out. The single reached number two on the Circle Digital Chart and amassed 4 music show wins. It also topped major local music charts such as Melon, Genie Music and Bugs.

== Critical reception ==
Professional ratings
Review scores
| Source | Rating |
|---|---|
| AllMusic | 4/5 stars |
| Clash | 8/10 |
| Dork | 4/5 stars |
| IZM | 2.5/5 stars |
| laut.de | 4/5 stars |
| NME | 4/5 stars |

Upon its release, My World received positive reviews from music critics, who noted the shift from the dark, futuristic "cyberpunk" world and praised Aespa's vocals and diversity. Rhian Daly of NME stated "My World might water down the layers of SM Culture Universe (SMCU) in its songs, but it doesn't dilute the sound that Aespa have become known for" elaborating that "[Naevis] which has been heavily referenced in their previous tracks feels much more subtle and is easily missed however she is there if [the listener] are attentive". Overall, she stated "My World proves Aespa could dominate other cosmoses otherwise SMCU". Sharifa Charles of Clash summarized the EP as "a remarkable showcase of [Aespa's] versatile talent" that "ventures into uncharted territory". Writing for AllMusic, Neil Z. Yeung gave My World a 4 out of 5 rating, citing it as an "absolute breath of fresh air" in the K-pop realm. Yeung added that the EP is "expanding the possibilities of sound and mood within the genre".

In her review for Dork, Abigail Firth stated that with the EP Aespa shows a new side of them while "doubling down on their versatility and expanding their ever-intriguing universe". IZM critic Seonghyun Han stated that the EP is "not a declaration of territorial occupation, but rather a signal to cross the border and open a gateway". He also named the track "Welcome to My World" a highlight on the record.

Year-end lists for My World
| Critic/Publication | List | Rank | Ref. |
|---|---|---|---|
| Paste | The 20 Best K-pop Albums of 2023 | 12 | |
| L'Éclaireur Fnac | K-pop Albums of the Year | N/A | |

== Commercial performance ==
On April 24, 2023, it was reported that My World has sold over 1.5 million copies in pre-orders sales in less than a week. The album debuted at number one on the Circle Album Chart, selling 1,420,178 copies for the 19th week of 2023. In the first week of release, it was reported that My World sold more than 1.6 million copies on the Hanteo Chart, surpassing Blackpink's Born Pink record from September 2022. In just two weeks after its release, the album became "a double million-seller" selling 2,011,388 copies. The album has since been certified double million by the Korea Music Content Association (KMCA). The EP also topped the monthly Circle Album Chart, selling 1,949,219 copies in the month of May.

In the United States, My World debuted at number nine on the Billboard 200 chart with 39,000 copies sold, following its physical release in the region. It was the group's second consecutive album to enter the top ten. Moreover, the EP claimed the top spot on both Billboard World Albums and Top Album Sales charts, earning their third No. 1 in the former chart.

According to the International Federation of the Phonographic Industry (IFPI)'s Global Music Report for 2023, My World was the twelfth best-selling album worldwide, having sold 2.1 million units. (Note: The IFPI Global Albums chart ranks, in order, the albums that generated the most money globally across streaming, download, and physical record sales (combined) in a calendar year. The Global Album Sales Chart measures global unit sales across all physical formats, as well as full album downloads.)

== Accolades ==
Awards and nominations for My World
| Award ceremony | Year | Category | Result | Ref. |
|---|---|---|---|---|
| Asian Pop Music Awards | 2023 | Best Album of the Year (Overseas) | Nominated | |
| Circle Chart Music Awards | 2023 | Artist of the Year — Album | Nominated | |
| Golden Disc Awards | 2023 | Best Album (Bonsang) | Won | |
| Golden Disc Awards | 2023 | Album of the Year (Daesang) | Nominated | |
| MAMA Awards | 2023 | Album of the Year | Longlisted | |
| Melon Music Awards | 2023 | Album of the Year | Nominated | |

== Track listing ==
Track listing for My World
| No. | Title | Lyrics | Music | Arrangement | Length |
|---|---|---|---|---|---|
| 1. | "Welcome to My World" (featuring Naevis) | Ellie Suh (153/Joombas); Hyun Ji-won; Danke (Lalala Studio) | Mich Hansen; Jacob Uchorczak; Celine Svanbäck; Patrizia Helander | Cutfather; Ubizz | 3:27 |
| 2. | "Spicy" | Bang Hye-hyun (Jam Factory) | Ludvig Evers (Moonshine); Jonatan Gusmark (Moonshine); Emily Yeonseo Kim; Moa "Cazzi Opeia" Carlebecker | Moonshine; Jinbyjin | 3:17 |
| 3. | "Salty & Sweet" | Bang Hye-hyun (Jam Factory) | Anne Judith Wik; Moa "Cazzi Opeia" Carlebecker; Jinbyjin | Jinbyjin | 3:22 |
| 4. | "Thirsty" | Kim Bo-eun (Jam Factory) | Geek Boy Al Swettenham; Kyler Niko; Paulina "Pau" Cerrilla | Geek Boy Al Swettenham | 3:13 |
| 5. | "I'm Unhappy" | Lee Seu-ran | Barry Cohen; Sophie Hintze; Ally Ahern | Gingerbread | 3:26 |
| 6. | "'Til We Meet Again" | Choi Jae-yeon (Jam Factory) | Jake K (Artiffect); Maria Marcus; Andreas Öberg; MCK (Artiffect) | Jake K (Artiffect); MCK (Artiffect) | 3:38 |
| Total length: | | | | | 20:23 |

== Credits and personnel ==
Credits adapted from the EP's liner notes.

Studio

- SM Yellow Tail Studio – recording (track 1, 3, 5), digital editing (track 1, 5)
- Seoul Studio – recording (track 1)
- SM Starlight Studio – recording (track 2, 5), digital editing (track 1–2, 5), mixing (track 5)
- SM Big Shot Studio – recording, digital editing (track 2), engineered for mix (track 3)
- Doobdoob Studio – recording (track 3, 6), digital editing (track 1, 3)
- Golden Bell Tree Sound – recording (track 4)
- SM LVYIN Studio – recording, digital editing, engineered for mix (track 4)
- Studio-T – recording (track 6)
- Sound Pool Studio – recording (track 6)
- SM SSAM Studio – digital editing, engineered for mix (track 6)
- SM Concert Hall Studio – mixing (track 1, 6)
- SM Blue Ocean Studio – mixing (track 2, 4)
- SM Blue Cup Studio – mixing (track 3)
- 821 Sound – mastering (all tracks)

Personnel

- SM Entertainment – executive producer
- Lee Sung-soo – A&R executive
- Jang Cheol-hyuk – executive supervisor
- Aespa – vocals, background vocals (all tracks)
- Ellie Suh (153/Joombas) – lyrics (track 1)
- Danke (Lalala Studio) – lyrics (track 1)
- Hyun Ji-won – lyrics (track 1)
- Mich Hansen a.k.a. Cutfather – composition, arrangement (track 1)
- Jacob "Ubizz" Uchorczak – composition, arrangement (track 1)
- Celine Svanbäck – composition (track 1)
- Patrizia Helander – composition (track 1)
- Bang Hye-hyun – lyrics (track 2–3)
- Jonatan Gusmark (Moonshine) – composition, arrangement, synthesizer, programming (track 2)
- Ludvig Evers (Moonshine) – composition, arrangement, synthesizer, programming (track 2)
- Moa "Cazzi Opeia" Carlebecker – composition (track 2–3), background vocals (track 2)
- Emily Yeonseo Kim – composition (track 2), vocal directing, background vocals (track 2–4)
- Jinbyjin – composition, vocal directing (track 3), arrangement (track 2–3), electric guitar, synthesizer, programming (track 2)
- Anne Judith Wik – composition (track 3)
- Kim Bo-eun – lyrics (track 4)
- Geek Boy Al Swettenham – composition, arrangement (track 4)
- Kyler Niko – composition (track 4)
- Paulina "Pau" Cerrilla – composition (track 4)
- Lee Seu-ran – lyrics (track 5)
- Barry Cohen a.k.a. Gingerbread – composition, arrangement (track 5)
- Sophie Hintze – composition, background vocals (track 5)
- Ally Ahern – composition, background vocals (track 5)
- Choi Jae-yeon – lyrics (track 6)
- Jake K (Artiffect) – composition, arrangement, vocal directing, bass, drums, guitar, piano, synthesizer (track 6)
- Maria Marcus – composition, background vocals (track 6)
- Andreas Öberg – composition (track 6)
- MCK (Artiffect) – composition, arrangement, drums, guitar, piano, synthesizer (track 6)
- Kriz – vocal directing, background vocals (track 1)
- Kenzie – vocal directing (track 5)
- Kwon Ae-jin – background vocals (track 6)
- Goldbranch – orchestral recording, orchestral arrangement, orchestral programming (track 1)
- SM Classics Town Orchestra – orchestration (track 1)
- Moon Jung-jae – piano, orchestral recording (track 1)
- Lee Jong-han – orchestral programming (track 1)
- Kim Kwang-hoon – guitar (track 6)
- Park In-young – strings conducting, strings arrangement (track 6)
- One String – strings (track 6)
- Noh Min-ji – recording (track 1, 3, 5), digital editing (track 1, 5)
- Jeong Ki-hong – recording (track 1)
- Choi Da-in – recording (track 1)
- Lee Chan-mi – recording (track 1)
- Jeong Yoo-ra – recording (track 2, 5), digital editing (track 1–2, 5), mixing (track 5)
- Lee Min-kyu – recording, digital editing (track 2), engineered for mix (track 3)
- Jang Woo-young – recording (track 3, 6), digital editing (track 1, 3)
- Kim Kwang-min – recording (track 4)
- Lee Ji-hong – recording, digital editing, engineered for mix (track 4)
- Oh Seong-geun – recording (track 6)
- On Seong-yoon – recording (track 6)
- Joo Ye-chan – recording assistant (track 6)
- Kang Eun-ji – digital editing, engineered for mix (track 6)
- Nam Koong-jin – mixing (track 1, 6)
- Kim Cheol-sun – mixing (track 2, 4)
- Jung Eui-seok – mixing (track 3)
- Kwon Nam-woo – mastering (all tracks)

== Charts ==
=== Weekly charts ===
Weekly chart performance
| Chart (2023–2024) | Peak position |
|---|---|
| Australian Albums (ARIA) | 67 |
| Belgian Albums (Ultratop Wallonia) | 102 |
| Croatian International Albums (HDU) | 1 |
| French Albums (SNEP) | 26 |
| Hungarian Albums (MAHASZ) | 30 |
| Japanese Albums (Oricon) | 3 |
| Japanese Combined Albums (Oricon) | 3 |
| Japanese Hot Albums (Billboard Japan) | 3 |
| Polish Albums (ZPAV) | 13 |
| Portuguese Albums (AFP) | 46 |
| South Korean Albums (Circle) | 1 |
| Spanish Albums (Promusicae) | 45 |
| US Billboard 200 | 9 |
| US World Albums (Billboard) | 1 |

=== Monthly charts ===
Monthly chart performance
| Chart (2023) | Position |
|---|---|
| Japanese Albums (Oricon) | 7 |
| South Korean Albums (Circle) | 1 |

=== Year-end charts ===
Year-end chart performance
| Chart (2023) | Position |
|---|---|
| Japanese Albums (Oricon) | 73 |
| Japanese Hot Albums (Billboard Japan) | 81 |
| South Korean Albums (Circle) | 9 |

== Certifications and sales ==
Certifications
| Region | Certification | Certified units/sales |
|---|---|---|
| South Korea (KMCA) | 2× Million | 2,111,917 |
Summaries
| Worldwide (IFPI) | — | 2,100,000 |

== Release history ==
Release history
| Region | Date | Format | Label |
|---|---|---|---|
| Various | May 8, 2023 | Digital download; streaming | SM; Warner; Dreamus |
| South Korea | May 8, 2023 | CD | SM; Dreamus |
| United States | June 30, 2023 | CD | SM; Warner |
