= Eddy Gronfier =

French radio DJ (born 1970)

Eddy Gronfier (b. France, 1970) is a French radio DJ. He started as a local radio host on Fun Radio Annecy in 1985, then NRJ Chambéry. In 1988, he moved to Paris to become the host of a national radio in primetime, this time on Fun Radio until 1990 alongside other hosts like Manu Levy, Max or Difool.

He hosted live shows, like La Plus Grande Discothèque du Monde at the Palais Omnisports de Paris-Bercy with Alexandre Debanne.

On an international level, his show "Maxi Fun" was broadcast in Japan on FM802, and he was part of the opening of Fun Radio (Romania)|Fun Radio in Romania which saw the day of light after the fall of the Berlin Wall.

He then moved on to Maxximum, a young dance radio, where he met key figures like Joachim Garraud, Fred Rister or Cocto. In 1992, he hosted "The Morning Show" with Caroline Davigny and "M40 rock" on M40 until 1994.

From 1994 to 1997, he was production manager on RTL2, and created simultaneously his production company "Proedit". He created the coverage for Skyrock's "priorite a la musique" and the show "Monstres" with Manu Levy and Francois Meunier. He also created the coverage for Radio Scoop, the one for "Zegut" on RTL" and "Charly et Lulu" on RTL2.

In 1997, he became music director of "Proedit" (production and publishing company). He produced music for television, including for Fox Kids, on which he was the voice performer on the show "Roger". He has several music credits for Eurosport, has made documentaries for La Cinquième and many advertisements (e.g. Tele2, Axe, Carambar).

In 2000, Eddy met Thomas Pieds, a young French director, with whom he created the production company Minority, becoming its music director. The pair also formed the group One-T which they signed with Polydor. They released a trilogy of hits on the album The One-T ODC such as "Music Is the One-T ODC" or"The Magic Key" which was the number 2 most played title on air in Europe during the summer of 2003. They got Gold records in France and Germany.

His music features in several movies, including "3 Zéros" "Neuilly sa mère" and "L’École pour tous" and has been the flagship music of the show "D & Co" on M6 for several years. One-T opened for Alizée at the Olympia in 2003 and was nominated at the MTV Europe Music Awards that year for best French act. Over the years, Eddy has produced several remixes for artists like Mylène Farmer, Axelle Red, Hélène Segara, Laura Pausini, Melissa Mars, Doc Gyneco or Nâdiya.

By 2009 he was based in Los Angeles, having formed his own US company "One-T Music Publishing" where he worked on albums and singles for artists such as Common featuring John Legend "Rain", Bob Sinclar " Feel the vibe", Joachim Garraud "Invasion", Perry Farrell, Kim Sozzi or Paul Ryder.

== Discography ==
=== Albums ===
- One-T ODC (2003) with Universal Polydor
- One-T's ABC (2007) with Universal Polydor

=== Singles ===
- Reasons Eddy Gronfier Remix Naked Koala ft Olaf Blackwood (Un Simple Plan) (Sony Music Entertainment)
- Rain Bloom RMX (Def Jam Recordings)
- Have it all Yooth (The Wire Record)
- 12345 Yooth ( Def Jam Recordings) (Island Records UK)
- DJ Dieselle (Wagram Music)
- Feel the Vibe Bob Sinclar (Yellow Production)
- The Magic Key One-T (Polydor)
- I know the score Boons (Virgin)
- Music Is The One-T ODCOne-T (Polydor)
- Bein'a star One-T (Polydor)
- Starky&Hutch 2004 One-T (Polydor)
- Kamasutra One-T (Polydor)
- Hamburguesa One-T(Polydor)
- Tomorrow's war One-T (Polydor)
- I woke up One-T (Polydor)
- Souveraine Doc Gynéco (Virgin)
- Secrets sucrés Doc Gynéco (Virgin)
- Applause For You Perry Farrell Presents Perryetty (Ultra Music)
- My Boyfriend is a Robot Joachim Garraud (Ultra Music/Zemixx)
- We are the future Joachim Garraud (Ultra Music)

=== Remixes ===
- L'instant X by One-T Mylène Farmer (Polydor)
- Bimbo à Moi Axelle Red (Virgin)
- Et alors! Melissa Mars (Polydor)
