= Spicy (Aespa song) =

- Nitepunk remix cover

Single by Aespa

from the EP My World
- Language: Korean
- Released: May 8, 2023
- Genre: Dance-pop; synth-pop
- Length: 3:17
- Label: SM; Warner; Dreamus
- Composers: Ludvig Evers (Moonshine); Jonatan Gusmark (Moonshine); Emily Yeonseo Kim; Moa "Cazzi Opeia" Carlebecker
- Lyricist: Bang Hye-hyun (JamFactory)

Aespa singles chronology
"Welcome to My World" (2023)	"Spicy" (2023)	"Better Things" (2023)

Music video
- "Spicy" on YouTube

"Spicy" is a song recorded by South Korean girl group Aespa for their third extended play My World. It was released as the EP's lead single by SM Entertainment on May 8, 2023.

== Background and release ==
On February 16, 2023, Lee Sung-soo released a 30-minute video stating: "Lee Soo-man was the reason why Aespa's music has been delayed" and that the group was supposed to release new music on February 20. He added that Soo-man wanted to start "injecting environmentalist motifs of tree-planting and sustainability into songs", which were eventually later scrapped as they "did not fit the world of Aespa" and made the group "upset". On March 16, SM Entertainment announced that Aespa would release a record in early May. On April 17, it was announced that the group's third EP, My World, containing six tracks, would be released on May 8. On April 24, the track listing was released via their official website with "Spicy" announced as the lead single. On May 6, a music video teaser was released. The song was released alongside the EP and its music video on May 8. On September 15, a remix version by Nitepunk was released.

== Composition ==
"Spicy" was written by Bang Hye-hyun (JamFactory), composed and arranged by Ludvig Evers (Moonshine), and Jonatan Gusmark (Moonshine), with Emily Yeonseo Kim, and Moa "Cazzi Opeia" Carlebecker participating in the composition, and Jinbyjin participating in the arrangement. It was described as an "experimental" dance, pop, and synth-pop song characterized by "intense synth-bass sound [and] dynamic beat rhythm". "Spicy" was composed in the key of B minor, with a tempo of 115 beats per minute.

== Music video ==
The music video, directed by 725 of SL8 Visual Lab, was released alongside the song on May 8. It portrays Aespa as high school students, with scenes depicting them getting ready for to throw a party and exploring the city.

== Commercial performance ==
"Spicy" debuted at number six on South Korea's Circle Digital Chart in the chart dated May 7–13, 2023. It ascended to number two in the chart dated May 21–27. In Japan, the song debuted at number 71 on the Billboard Japan Hot 100 on May 17, ascending to number 64. On the Oricon Streaming Chart, it debuted at number 48 on May 22, ascending to number 43 the following week.

In Singapore, the song debuted at number 22 on the RIAS Top Streaming Chart in the chart dated May 12–18. It also debuted at number 17 on the RIAS Top Regional Chart in the chart dated May 5–11. In Vietnam, it debuted at number 27 on the Billboard Vietnam Hot 100 on May 18. In Hong Kong, it debuted at number 24 on the Billboard Hong Kong Songs on May 27. In Taiwan, the song debuted at number 14 on the Billboard Taiwan Songs on May 27.

In the United States, the song debuted at number six on the Billboard World Digital Song Sales on August 26. In New Zealand, it debuted at number 34 on the RMNZ Hot Singles on May 15. Globally, the song debuted at number 160 on the Billboard Global 200, and number 77 on the Billboard Global Excl. U.S on May 20. It ascended to number 70 on the Billboard Global 200, and number 42 on the Billboard Global Excl. U.S in the following week.

== Promotion ==
Prior to the release of My World, on May 8, 2023, Aespa held a live event called "Aespa 'My World' Countdown Live" on YouTube, TikTok, and IdolPlus to introduce the album and its songs, including "Spicy", and to communicate with their fans. The group subsequently performed on four music programs in the first week: Mnet's M Countdown on May 11, KBS's Music Bank on May 12, MBC's Show! Music Core on May 13, and SBS's Inkigayo on May 14. On the second and final week of promotion, they performed four music programs: M Countdown on May 18, Music Bank on May 19, Show! Music Core on May 20, and Inkigayo on May 21, where they won first place for all appearances.

== Track listing ==
Digital download / streaming – original

1. "Spicy" – 3:17

Digital download / streaming – Nitepunk remix

1. "Spicy" (Nitepunk remix) – 3:10
2. "Spicy" – 3:17

== Accolades ==
Grammy included "Spicy" in their list of the 15 K-Pop Songs That Took 2023 By Storm.

Awards and nominations for "Spicy"
Award ceremony	Year	Category	Result	Ref.
Circle Chart Music Awards	2023	Artist of the Year — Streaming Unique Listeners	Won	
Circle Chart Music Awards	2023	Artist of the Year — Digital	Nominated	
Circle Chart Music Awards	2023	Artist of the Year — Global Streaming	Nominated	
Golden Disc Awards	2023	Best Digital Song (Bonsang)	Nominated	
MAMA Awards	2023	Best Dance Performance – Female Group	Nominated	
MAMA Awards	2023	Song of the Year	Longlisted	
Melon Music Awards	2023	Song of the Year	Nominated	

Music program awards
Program	Date	Ref.
Inkigayo	May 21, 2023	
M Countdown	May 18, 2023	
Music Bank	May 19, 2023	
Show! Music Core	May 20, 2023	

== Credits and personnel ==
Credits adapted from EP's liner notes.

Studio

- SM Big Shot Studio – recording, digital editing
- SM Starlight Studio – recording, digital editing
- SM Blue Ocean Studio – mixing
- 821 Sound – mastering

Personnel

- SM Entertainment – executive producer
- Aespa – vocals, background vocals
- Bang Hye-hyun – lyrics
- Jonatan Gusmark (Moonshine) – composition, arrangement, synthesizer, programming
- Ludvig Evers (Moonshine) – composition, arrangement, synthesizer, programming
- Moa "Cazzi Opeia" Carlebecker – composition, background vocals
- Emily Yeonseo Kim – composition, vocal directing, background vocals
- Jinbyjin – arrangement, electric guitar, synthesizer, programming
- Lee Min-kyu – recording, digital editing
- Jeong Yoo-ra – recording, digital editing
- Kim Cheol-sun – mixing
- Kwon Nam-woo – mastering

== Charts ==
=== Weekly charts ===
Weekly chart performance for "Spicy"
Chart (2023)	Peak position
Global 200 (Billboard)	70
Hong Kong (Billboard)	24
Japan (Japan Hot 100)	64
Japan Streaming (Oricon)	43
New Zealand Hot Singles (RMNZ)	34
Singapore (RIAS)	22
South Korea (Circle)	2
Taiwan (Billboard)	14
US World Digital Song Sales (Billboard)	6
Vietnam (Vietnam Hot 100)	27

=== Monthly charts ===
Monthly chart performance for "Spicy"
Chart (2023)	Position
South Korea (Circle)	4

=== Year-end charts ===
Year-end chart performance for "Spicy"
Chart	Year	Position
South Korea (Circle)	2023	13
South Korea (Circle)	2024	52
South Korea (Circle)	2025	150

== Certifications ==
Certifications for "Spicy"
Region	Certification	Certified units/sales
Streaming
Japan (RIAJ)	Platinum	100,000,000^{†}
South Korea (KMCA)	Platinum	100,000,000^{†}
^{†} Streaming-only figures based on certification alone.

== Release history ==
Release history for "Spicy"
Region	Date	Format	Version	Label
Various	May 8, 2023	Digital download; streaming	Original	SM; Warner; Dreamus
Various	September 15, 2023	Digital download; streaming	Nitepunk remix	SM; ScreaM; Warner; Dreamus
