= Kyra (virtual influencer) =

Indian fictional character

- First appearance: 28 January 2022
- Created by: FUTR STUDIOS

In-universe information
- Alias: Kyraonig
- Species: Artificial intelligence
- Gender: Female
- Occupation: Instagram influencer
- Origin: India

Kyra or Kyraonig is an Indian fictional character created by FUTR STUDIOS, founded by George Tharian and Himanshu Goel. She was launched in Jan 2022 as an Instagram profile. The account is India’s first virtual influencer. She has been featured on the digital cover of Travel + Leisure, India and has done several brand endorsements so far with brands like Amazon Prime Video, boAt and John Jacobs. As of August 2024, she has gained over 250,000 followers on her Instagram profile.
