= Shudu Gram =

South African Computer generated model

Shudu Gram is a computer generated social media personality and model, a "virtual influencer". The character is considered the world's first digital supermodel.

She was created in April 2017 by the fashion photographer Cameron-James Wilson. Her appearance draws largely from the "Princess of South Africa" Barbie doll.

The character has generated controversy as Shudu, depicted as a black woman, was created by a white man.
