= One-T =

French virtual band

ONE-T
- Origin: France
- Genres: Hip hop, pop, Electronic music
- Years active: 2001 - 2006, 2022 - Present
- Label: Minority
- Members: Eddy Gronfier; Thomas Pieds

One-T are a French virtual band created in 2000 by Eddy Gronfier and Thomas Pieds. Eddy Gronfier produces the music while Thomas Pieds creates the artwork and visuals. They were successful across Europe, especially France and Germany, with their 2003 hit single "The Magic Key", but since then were not able to repeat that success and remained a one-hit wonder.

== History ==
One-T made their first appearance in France during the summer of 2001, with the release of the single "Music Is The One-T ODC". The single was ranked the 82nd best-selling single over the year of 2001. It was followed shortly by the single "Bein' a Star".

One-T returned to the dance music scene in the summer of 2003 with their single "The Magic Key", which introduced One-T's best friend, Cool-T, as the rap singer in the song. The title reached 9th place of the single charts and was ranked the 22nd best-selling single for 2003. "The Magic Key" was also well received in Germany, Poland and Austria, where it reached fifth place of the single charts, and Denmark, where it reached fourth place. Their first full-length album, The One-T ODC, was released in July 2003.

Several singles followed over the years, including the theme song for the 2004 film Starsky & Hutch, and "Kamasutra", released in early 2005. However, none of them were very successful, and they remained a one-hit wonder in most parts of Europe.

One-T's second studio album, The One-T's ABC, was released in early 2006 as a digital album, and was available only on a few legal downloading sites, such as iTunes. In 2007, the album was released physically and garnered much success in France and the rest of Europe.

In honor of the 20th anniversary of the musical group One-T, in July 2022 album The One-T ODC was remastered. Also, a music video for the remastered song was released: "The Magic Key 2", together with Boogie Fre$h.

== The Concept ==
=== Characters ===
One-T is composed of several characters.

Main Characters:

One-T : The titular character and one of the main protagonists. A 13-year-old boy who abuses drugs and insults his new-age parents. Despite his young age, he dreams of becoming a DJ and wants to unite all teenagers around the world against the war in Iraq, and continue to produce his influences in different languages.

Nine-T (later Fat-T): A young Arabic-Latino and best friend of One-T. He organizes events in his father's bar. He changed his name to Fat-T since the release of The One-T's ABC.

Cool-T: Another friend of One-T, born from an African descent. At the end of the "Bein’ a Star" music video, he gets shot by Travoltino, which is the subject of "The Magic Key". Later he is kicked out of heaven, and returns to Earth.

E: A gifted Japanese computer hacker and another one of One-T’s friends. He lives with his twin sister Ee and never goes outside.

Ee: The twin sister of E. Her personality is the complete opposite of E's. She is the singer from most of the singles. Ee is also Cool-T’s possible girlfriend.

Bull-T: One-T's pet dog. Bull-T was genetically manipulated to never bark loudly or be mean.

The enemies of One-T:

Travoltino: A mobster and television personality. He owns a record company, a TV channel, a newspaper, and a nightclub, where it is difficult to enter without being "jet-set." He is the enemy of One-T, and is the one who shot Cool-T.

Acidman: An inventor and dealer of his own drugs. His work is funded by Travoltino. Acidman is currently wanted by the police.

Chicken: The Chicken are an army policemen and the minions of Acidman.

=== Setting ===
The music videos for The One-T ODC take place at a city with a nightclub and street shown in the Music Is The One-T ODC and Bein’ a Star videos. In Bein’ a Star, it also shows an apartment building with rooms for One-T & Ee; One-T lives in his apartment living room and Ee lives in her apartment bathroom.

The music videos for The One-T’s ABC take place at an updated version of the city, with Kamasutra taking place in a movie studio and Hamburgesa taking place at a Fast Food Restaurant. For Tomorrow’s War, it takes place in a darkened room which turns out to be Cool-T’s apartment bedroom with the video game he’s playing taking place during a war zone where he and his friends are.

=== Animation ===
The videos from The One-T ODC are 2-D animated with The Magic Key having rough animation looking like storyboard art while the videos from The One-T’s ABC are CGI except for Hamburgesa which is 2-D animated and U!!! doesn’t have a music video at all.

== Creators ==
The cartoon characters in this band were created to conceal the real people behind this project. The people behind this project are Eddy Gronfier, responsible for the musical part of the project, is a former radio host (on NRJ, Fun Radio, Maxximum, M40 Rock ....), jingle producer (on RTL, Skyrock, M40, Radio Scoop ...), radio director (The monsters on Skyrock, Charly and Lulu on RTL 2 ...), and composer/ remixer of One-T, and Thomas Pieds, author of the concept and the song lyrics, is also the director of the One-T music videos. Before One-T, Thomas was already directing music videos, TV ads and TV series.

== Discography ==
=== Albums ===
| Year | Chart Statistics | Singles |
|---|---|---|
| 2003 | The One-T ODC: Studio Album; Released: July 2003; French Peak Position: #72 | "Music Is The One-T ODC"; "Bein' a Star"; "The Magic Key" |
| 2006 | The One-T's ABC: Studio Album; Released: 2006 (Digital), 2007 (physical) | "Kamasutra"; "Hamburguesa"; "U!!!"; "Tomorrow's War" |
| 2022 | The One-T ODC (20th Anniversary Remastered Deluxe Edition) • Studio Album: Released: 2022 | • "The Magic Key 2" ft. Boogie Fre$h |

=== Singles ===
Chart Statistics
One-T

Music Is The One-T ODC (aka Odyssey)

- Released: July 2001
- Peak position (France): #12
- Certification: Silver
- Sells: 200 000
- Trivia: The song contains a theme from "Má hra" (from their 1971 album Nová syntéza) by Blue Effect, a Czechoslovak progressive rock band.
One-T

Bein' A Star

- Released: November 2002
- Peak position (France) : #59
- Trivia: The song contains a theme from "Má hra" (from their 1971 album Nová syntéza) by Blue Effect, a Czechoslovak progressive rock band.
One-T + Cool-T

The Magic Key

- Released: July 2003
- Peak Position: #9 (Fr.), #7 (Swi.), #5 (Ger.), #5 (Pol.), #5 (Aut.), #4 (Dan.)
- Certification: Gold (France, Germany)
- Sells: 247 000 (France), 250 000 (Germany)
- Trivia: The song contains a theme from "Má hra" (from their 1971 album Nová syntéza) by Blue Effect, a Czechoslovak progressive rock band.

No. 3 of the most played songs on European radio and television during 2003 summer. One of the longest-running singles in 2003 French Charts (41 weeks).

Cool-T

Starsky & Hutch

- Released: May 2004
- Peak Position: #16 (Fr.)
- Trivia: This song was used as the main song from the 2004 Starsky & Hutch movie.

It is the first song ever released by One-T's best friend (Cool-T). One-T produced the single.

Cool-T

Kamasutra

- Released: November 2004
- Peak Position: #40 (Fr.)
- Trivia: One-T produced this single.
One-T feat. Fat-T & Cool-T

Hamburguesa

- Released: 2005 (Digital Single only)
One-T

U!!!

- Released: November 2005 (Digital Single only)
- Trivia: The song contains a theme from "Má hra" (from their 1971 album Nová syntéza) by Blue Effect, a Czechoslovak progressive rock band.
One-T + Cool-T

Tomorrow's War

- Released: April 2006 (Digital Single)
- 2007 (Physical Single)
One-T + Cool-T ft. Boogie Fre$h

The Magic Key 2

• Released: July 2022

One-T, Cool-T ft. Boogie Fre$h

Check Up

- Released: 03/17/2023
One-T, Artespo, DOMI

Don't Leave My Head (LaLaLa)

- Released: 12/1/2023
One-T ft. Boogie Fre$h

Superstar

- Released: 06/14/2024
