= Kyoko Date =

Virtual idol associated with Horipro

Kyoko Date (伊達杏子, Date Kyōko) is a virtual influencer associated with Horipro. She made her debut in 1996 as a 3D CG character. Despite her virtual nature, she was treated as talent by Horipro. She never enjoyed great popularity, but after her debut she intermittently continued her activities until 2007. Two related characters named Kaori Date and Ayano Date would eventually follow in her footsteps, with the former being a model and the latter becoming a VTuber.

== Naming ==
Kyoko Date was developed under the code name "DK-96", and debuted in 1996 under the stage name Kyoko Date DK-96 (伊達杏子 DK-96). "DK" was an abbreviation for "Digital Kids", while "96" indicated that this was the 1996 version. The name Kyoko Date was chosen as a Japanese-sounding name to represent the Digital Kids initials, and it was listed as her real name on her official profile. The year after her release, her code name was updated to "Kyoko Date DK-97", and in 1999 she made her Korean debut under the name "DiKi". The version that appeared in 2001 was called "Kyoko Date DK-2001". The 2007 version is simply known as "Kyoko Date" and has no code name.

== First appearance ==
Kyoko Date was developed in collaboration with Visual Science Laboratory, Inc. to commemorate the 35th anniversary of Horipro's founding. The production was headed by Horipro's future president Yoshitaka Hori, the second son of founder Takeo Hori.

The idea originated in 1995, the year before Kyoko's debut. It was hoped that, at a time when the number of media channels available was increasing, a virtual idol would be able to appear without the problem of time restrictions. Meanwhile, dating sims like Tokimeki Memorial were also popular, and its heroine Shiori Fujisaki, among others, was being called a "virtual idol", being treated as a talent, and gaining popularity. As Horipro embarked on the development of a 3D CG virtual idol, some thought that the current world of show business would be taken over by such popular virtual characters, and an environment welcoming of anime voice actors and game characters would also accept a CG idol. In early 1990, Hori was working as the director for the radio station Nippon Broadcasting System, and became involved with a project born on the radio program of Hikaru Ijūin to produce a fictional idol, Yui Haga. This experience also influenced Kyoko's development. Kyoko's fictional biography, on the other hand, stated that she was first scouted while working part-time at a hamburger shop in front of Fussa Station.

Ten Horipro employees and 50 technical staffers worked on Kyoko Date's development, and the initial monetary investment in the project was said to be on the order of several tens of millions of yen (hundreds of thousands of dollars). Hori's group first designed an illustration on which further production was based. The CG artist Tatsuya Kosaka (KonKon) was in charge of the modeling work. Her voice was provided by a human actress, chosen from 50 of Horipro's associated talent and female employees on the basis of having an appropriate voice for an idol. Her singing voice and her speaking voice were provided by different individuals. Horipro created the script when she spoke on the radio or elsewhere. Kyoko's movements were animated via motion capture, then a very new technology, and recorded by American dancers. Producing content was very expensive, costing several million yen (tens of thousands of dollars) for a stage appearance. This far exceeded the cost of simply paying a new talent, but it was viewed as a pioneering investment in a new genre. Her actual range of activities included CD sales and radio and television appearances, but virtual live shows and the sale of photobooks were also under consideration. Horipro viewed Date as a dream talent for the multimedia age of the 21st century: she would never get sick or be involved in any scandals, she could appear simultaneously on any number of channels worldwide, and she could speak and sing in any language of the world. This would allow her to perform on a global scale cheaply, quickly, and precisely. Yet in spite of these advantages, and in spite of sales promotion, it was issues such as the unnatural quality of her movements that came to the fore.

An announcement was originally planned to precede a debut in the fall of 1995, but development experienced delays. The project was officially announced in May 1996 but produced no releases until the end of that year. Before the debut, Kyoko attracted a lot of attention, including from the overseas media, but the delay gave the hype time to cool off, which may have contributed to the project's lack of success. Because radio performances required only a voice actor, Kyoko first became active in that field, appearing on the Tokyo FM radio program G1 Grouper in October 1996. On November 2, she made her video and chatting appearance on the TBS informational program Broad Caster. Her CD debut came on November 21 with the single LOVE COMMUNICATION but sold less than 30,000 units. In 1997 her voice was changed, her name was updated to "Kyoko Date DK-97, and her CD single Touch was released on July 21. She appeared on posters of the Ministry of International Trade and Industry and on the front cover of the ad magazine Jamāru, but in the end, Kyoko Date disappeared after just a few months of minor activity. Still, the publicity she provided is said to have served Horipro well in their later projects.

Meanwhile, on December 5, 1996, Fujisaki Shiori of Tokimeki Memorial made her own CD debut as a virtual idol with Oshiete Mr. Sky. Although comparable in concept to Kyoko Date, this debut was a hit, in stark contrast to Kyoko's stagnation. This may have been because Kyoko was essentially an evolution of the existing notion of an idol, while Fujisaki represented a new kind of idol able to win the hearts of anime and game fans. Fujisaki's debut as a singer was run by Watanabe Digital Media & Communications, a company associated with Watanabe Productions and headed by the eldest daughter of its founder Shin Watanabe, Miki Watanabe. At the time, Yoshitaka Hori and Miki Watanabe were seen by some as the second-generation leaders of the entertainment industry's leading production companies. Others opined that even if Kyoko were to find success as a radio DJ, her real success would come only after the person who provided her voice discarded the facade of Kyoko's character and emerged into the spotlight personally.

In 1999, Kyoko debuted in South Korea under the name "DiKi" with an album entitled Between, but again found no success.

=== Profile ===
Kyoko Date's profile during the DK-96 era:

- Real name: Kyoko Date (伊達杏子, Date Kyōko) (Her friends call her "Datekyō")
- Stage name: Kyoko Date DK-96 (伊達杏子 DK-96, Date Kyōko DK-96)
- Date of birth: October 26, 1979 (16 years old)
- Birthplace: Fussa, Tokyo

=== Radio ===
- Kyoko Date DK-96: G1 Grouper
- Kyoko Date DK-97: Rabirabi Labyrinth

=== Discography ===
==== Japan ====
- Love Communication (November 21, 1996, CD Extra)
  - Ending theme to the Nippon TV drama Yokubō no Shokutaku
  1. Love Communication
  2. Love Communication (Acoustic Heart mix)
  3. Love Communication (Back Track)
- Touch (July 21, 1997)

==== Korea ====
- Between (February 1999)
  1. Albatross - 자유 (Albatross - Freedom)
  2. Between You & Me
  3. Pyeonji (편지)
  4. For U
  5. 1st White Day
  6. Chuyeong Hwesang (초연회상; 初恋回想)
  7. Silver Lining Rainbow
  8. Namanui kkum (나만의 꿈)
  9. Albatross - 자유 (Inst.)
  10. Between You & Me (Inst.)

== Second appearance ==
In 2001, a version of Kyoko Date titled "Kyoko Date DK-2001" served as the navigator for a series of general-audience, internet-based lectures from the Kanazawa Institute of Technology called Entertainment Engineering College (エンターテインメント工科大学). It was intended that this version proceed on to appearing in online advertisements, and Horipro explained away the character's earlier failure as a result of being "ahead of her time", but DK-2001 too vanished without any significant activity. This version was supposed to have born on June 9, 1983, and the modeler who created it used the pseudonym Sonehachi.

== Third appearance ==
In 2007, Kyoko Date once again reemerged as an avatar in the virtual world Second Life. The design of this version was based on that of DK-2001. She appeared mainly as an event MC, but as the popularity of Second Life dwindled, she soon stopped her activities once again.

== Virtual relatives ==
Around the year 2000, the creation of 3D CG idols was popular among modelers, and Kyoko Date's original modeler Tatsuya Kosaka created another character, Kaori Date (伊達薫, Date Kaori; DK02), who was alternately described as the younger cousin or younger sister of Kyoko Date. Kaori appeared in a number of photobooks, beginning with Virtual Beauty Collection 3: Crystal in 1999. She won the grand prize, based on votes by viewers, on a program broadcast from 1999 to 2000 on Digicas entitled CG Idol Contest.

In November 2018, Horipro unveiled a new character by the name of Ayano Date (伊達あやの, Date Ayano), who was revealed to be the daughter of Kyoko Date. It was stated that she dreamed of becoming an idol just like her mother, and the company aspired to launch her career as a VTuber following the success of fellow virtual artists such as Hatsune Miku and Kizuna AI. A crowdfunding campaign was launched for her virtual career and was deemed successful, with her YouTube and social media accounts launching almost immediately.

== See also ==
Similar characters

- Lara Croft
- Cita's World
- Mya (program)
- T-Babe
- Ananova
- Gorillaz
- Hatsune Miku
- Kizuna AI
