= Atomic Youth =

Virtual band from England

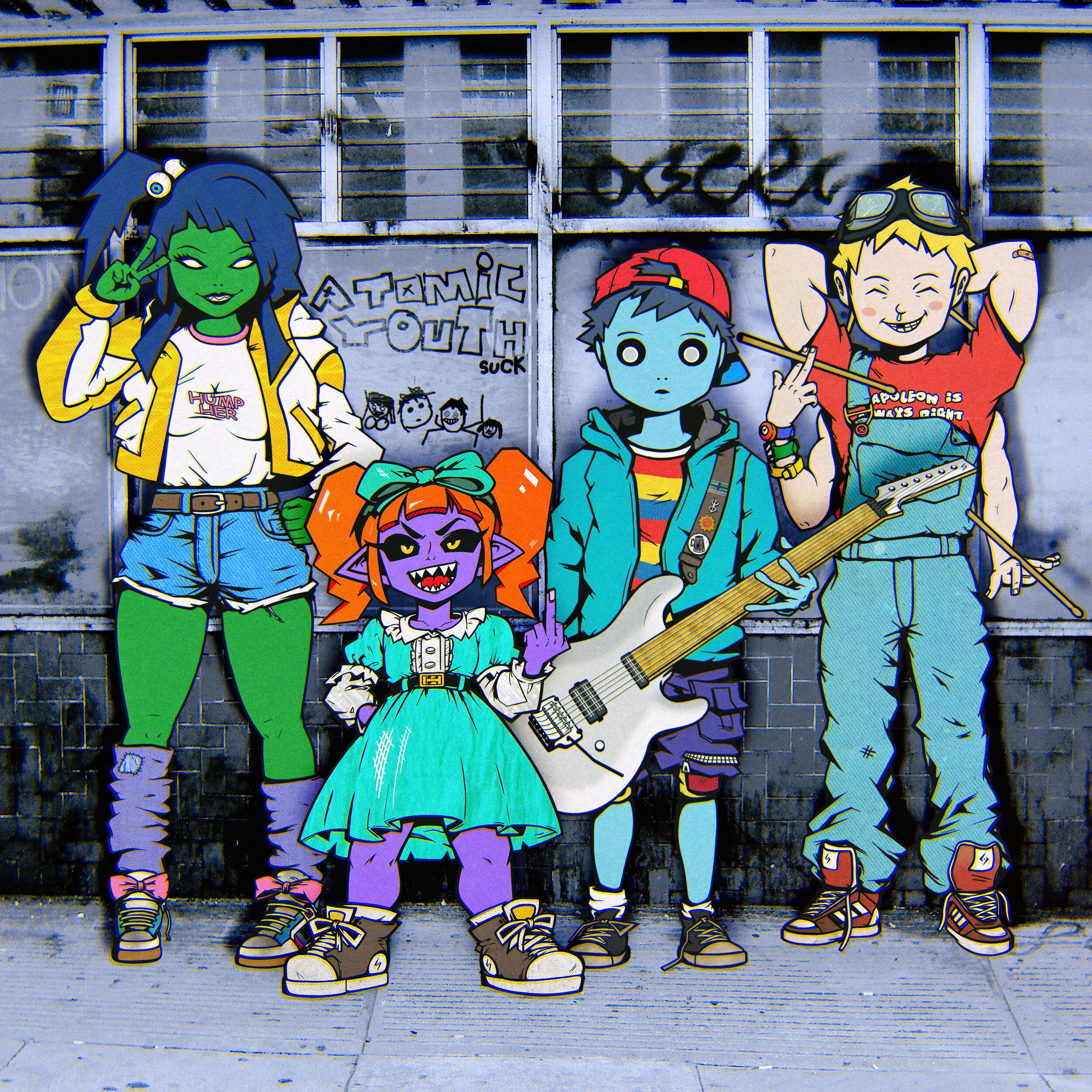
- Illustrations of the virtual band members. Left to right: Juice, Jingo, Johnny, and Jam.

Background information
- Also known as: アトミック・ユース; Атомик Юс; 原子青春; 아토믹 유스
- Origin: England
- Genres: progressive metal, metalcore, folk rock, math rock, chiptune
- Years active: 2016-present^{[a]}
- Label: i^{2}
- Members: Juice Longshanks; Little Johnny; Jingo Scribbins; Jam Ælfwin
- Past members: Jethro^{[b]}
- Website: atomicyouth.org

Atomic Youth is an English virtual band created by artist and musician superspink. The project combines elements of progressive metal, folk rock, electronic music, and chiptune, featuring four illustrated and 3D-rendered fictional band members. Drawing on themes from English folklore, the project presents a stylized multimedia universe that merges music, visual art, and mythology.

== History ==
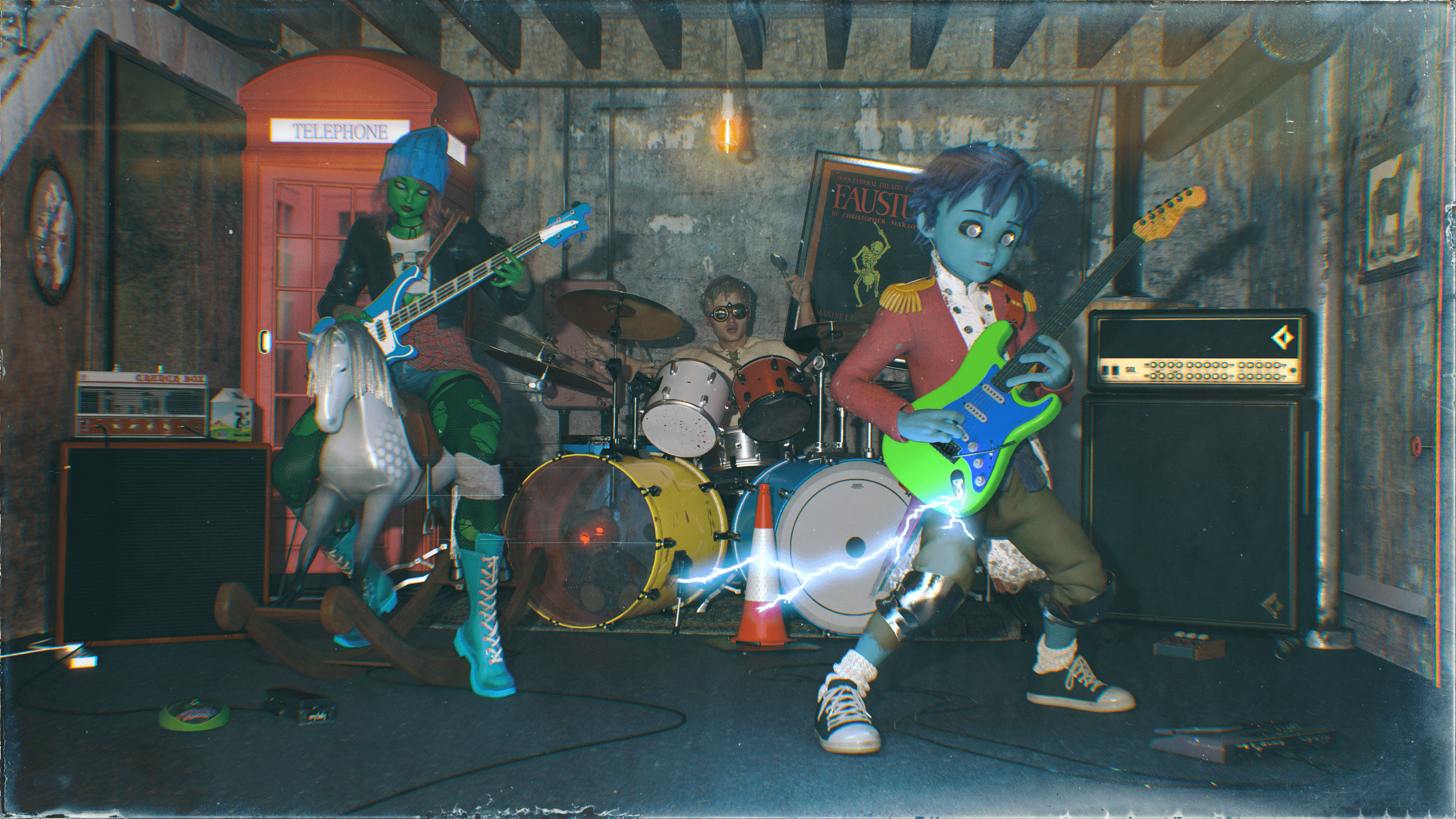
A 3D-style example of Atomic Youth's virtual members.

The project was founded in 2016, with the band's first official release, AYV I-V Sunset Trajectory, appearing in 2017. The project centers on four fictional members - Juice Longshanks, Little Johnny, Jam Ælfwin and Jingo Scribbins - who are consistently presented through both stylized illustration and 3D renders described as hyperreal.

A video game set in the band's fictional universe was announced in 2025.

== Musical style ==
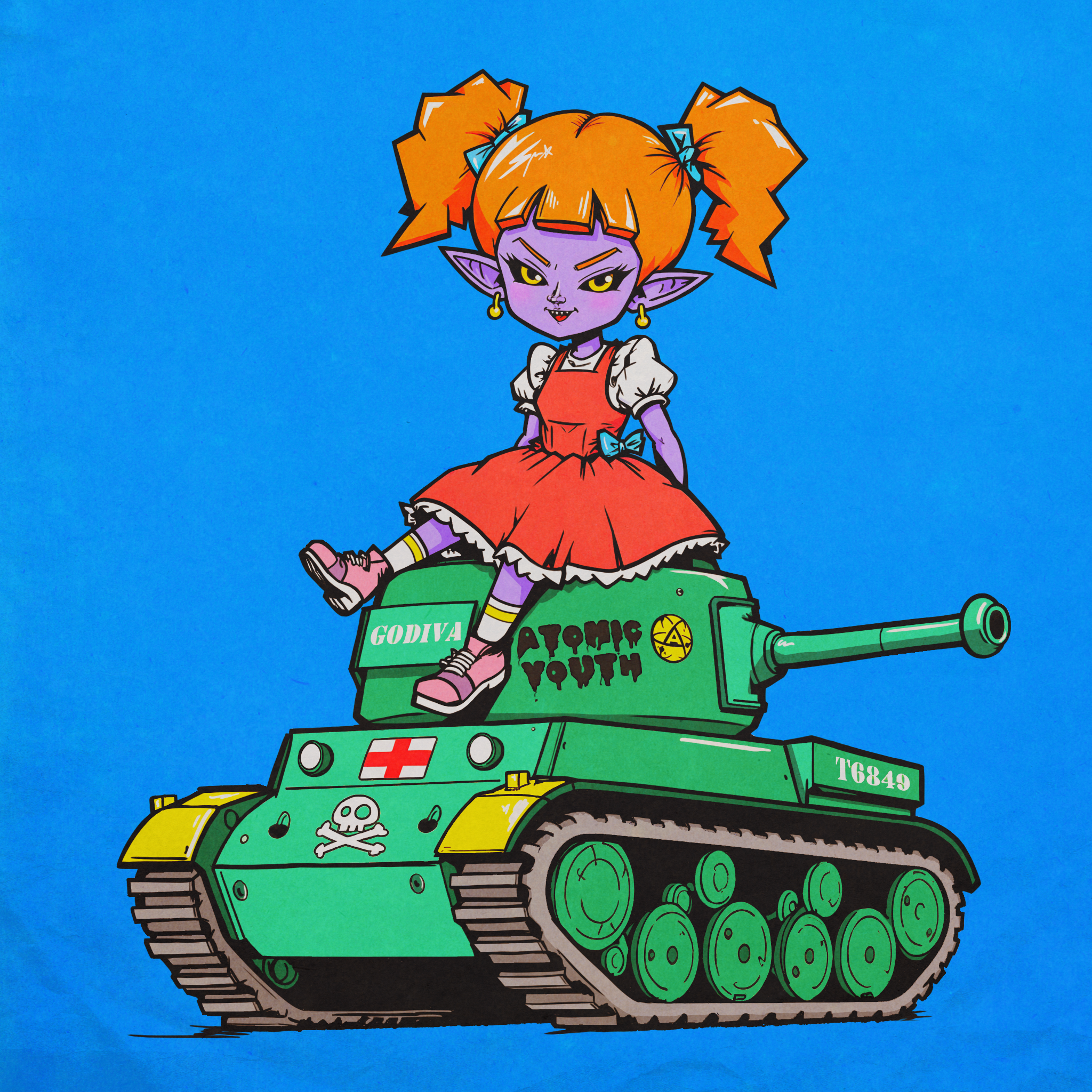
Illustration of Jingo Scribbins, Atomic Youth's flautist and synth player.

Atomic Youth is an instrumental project rooted in progressive metal, incorporating elements of progressive rock, folk rock, electronic music, and chiptune. Their compositions feature shifting time signatures, polyrhythms, and extended instrumental sections.

The band makes use of traditional instruments such as lute, mandolin, and penny whistle alongside electric guitar and synthesizers, with some arrangements drawing on English folk music and triple meter forms such as jigs. Their electric instrumentation also includes seven-string and baritone guitars, providing an extended range for lower tunings and heavier textures. Keyboards and synthesizers range from melodic leads to ambient layering, sometimes incorporating harpsichord passages, scratching and chiptune sequences.

While largely instrumental, some recordings include short spoken monologues or voice samples attributed to the band's fictional characters. The group describes its sound as "Wyrd Metal", a self-defined term referencing the Old English word Wyrd for their fusion of folk frameworks with progressive metal and experimental structures.

== Concept ==
Atomic Youth's fictional members are presented through illustrated and 3D-rendered imagery, with the project's website and promotional material adopting a comedic, absurd tone influenced by traditions of British humour.

The official website expands on this presentation through in-universe material such as fictionalized vignettes, parody news articles (Atomic Zephyr), and mock interviews, making use of metafiction and parodying aspects of the music industry and popular media while further developing the band's fictional universe and characters.

== Virtual members ==
Atomic Youth consists of four fictional characters who perform different instrumental roles. The designs combine elements of folklore, mythological archetypes, and contemporary pop culture.

- Juice Longshanks - bass (2016–present).
- Little Johnny - guitar, lute, mandolin (2016–present).
- Jingo Scribbins - penny whistle, synths, turntables (2017–present).
- Jam Ælfwin - drums (2016–present).

Juice Longshanks is depicted as a tall, green-skinned woman who plays bass for the band. Promotional material references the Grindylow, the Green Man, and the Green Children of Woolpit. Her portrayal emphasizes feminine styling and femme fatale traits, with promotional material presenting her as both alluring and eccentric.

Jam Ælfwin is presented as a four-armed drummer referencing the Alcis and broader Proto-Indo-European mythology; the name Ælfwin ("elf-friend") draws on early English myth and usages in Tolkien's legendarium.

Jingo Scribbins is a purple-skinned piskie-like multi-instrumentalist described in promotional material as "Puck's daughter," referencing Puck. Her visual design mixes Victorian fashion with dolly kei elements.

Little Johnny is the lead guitarist with design parallels to the Grey alien and folklore of Little green men. His artwork is labelled 未詳 ("unknown"), reflecting his ambiguous origin. He is depicted as speaking in Early Modern English, with references to the Dodleston messages.

These in-universe personas are used in official artwork and communications as part of the project's overall presentation.

== Discography ==
=== Studio albums ===
- AYV I-V Sunset Trajectory (2017) - Debut release
- Sunset Trajectory (East Edition) (2025) - Localized edition translated for multiple language markets
- [Phantom Future] (TBA) - Upcoming album

=== Singles ===
- Sampson Was a Shire Horse (2021)

=== Other appearances ===
- Bones of Avalon, Vol. I (2022) - Features the track: "アトミック・ユース2016"
- Bones of Avalon, Vol. II (2024) - Includes various Atomic Youth tracks: "PK Slime"; "Wigner's Mate"; "The Ballad of Oswald, the Local Wizard"; "Fiddler's Green"; "Ēostre Ārisen"

A playlist titled Project Atom, featuring demos, previews, and in-development material, has been maintained on the official SoundCloud account of the creator since the band's inception.

== Other media ==
A video game set in the band's fictional universe was announced via Atomic Youth's official website in April 2025, with the release date to be confirmed.

== Notes ==
- [a] Hiatus from 2021 to 2024.
- [b] A parody interview from the band's official website states that Jingo was hired after the previous flautist "fell down a lift shaft in Kalifornia [sic]".
