= Mave: =

South Korean virtual girl group

- Mave: in the MV for their debut single "Pandora"; From left to right: Marty, Zena, Siu, Tyra

Background information
- Genre: K-pop
- Years active: 2023–present
- Label: Metaverse Entertainment
- Members: Siu; Zena; Tyra; Marty
- Website: mave-official.com

Mave: (Korean: 메이브; stylized as MAVE:) is a South Korean virtual girl group formed in 2023 by Metaverse Entertainment. The group consists of Siu, Zena, Tyra, and Marty, who are hyper-realistic, 3D CGI members that were created using machine learning, deepfake, and 3D production technology.

== History ==
=== 2022: Formation ===
Mave: was formed in 2022, when on November 8, it was reported that Metaverse Entertainment, which is a subsidiary of the game-developing company Netmarble Corporation, were preparing to debut a virtual idol group. The group's creation reportedly follows a change in the Korean music industry as K-pop groups and entertainment companies delve into the possibility of introducing various forms of entertainment into the metaverse; although the group isn't the first to include virtual idols, they are the first K-pop group created entirely within the metaverse. The group is able to communicate in 4 languages: Korean, French, English, and Bahasa, due to the help of an AI voice generator, but their voices and choreography are created by undisclosed human performers.

The group was formed as a collaboration between Kakao Entertainment and Netmarble, with Kakao involved in investing and distributing the group's music.

=== 2023–present: Debut and comeback with What's My Name ===
On January 11, 2023, Metaverse Entertainment announced via Twitter that Mave: would be releasing their debut single album Pandora's Box on January 25 with two singles: "Pandora" and "Wonderland (Idypia)". The title track "Pandora" describes a hopeless future where emotions are lost and regaining hope in a virtual world known as Idypia.

On November 9, Metaverse Entertainment announced that Mave: are preparing for a comeback. The group released their first EP What's My Name on November 30.

== Members ==
Names and positions are adapted from the group's official website:

- Siu: (시우) – leader, vocalist
- Zena: (제나) – vocalist
- Tyra: (타이라) – rapper, dancer
- Marty: (마티) – dancer, rapper

== Discography ==
=== Singles albums ===
| Title | Details |
|---|---|
| Pandora's Box | Released: January 25, 2023; Label: Metaverse Entertainment; Formats: Digital download, streaming |

=== Extended plays ===
| Title | Details |
|---|---|
| What's My Name | Released: November 30, 2023; Label: Metaverse Entertainment; Formats: Digital download, streaming |

=== Singles ===
| Title | Year | Peak chart positions | Album |
| Title | Year | KOR | Album |
|---|---|---|---|
| "Pandora" | 2023 | — (Note: "Pandora" did not enter the Circle Chart, but it peaked at number 131 on the component Circle Download Chart.) | Pandora's Box |
| "What's My Name" | 2023 | — | What's My Name |
"—" denotes a recording that did not chart or was not released in that territory

== Filmography ==
=== Music videos ===
| Title | Year | Director | Length | Ref. |
|---|---|---|---|---|
| "Pandora" | 2023 | Seo Dong-hyeok (Flipevil) | 3:32 | |
| "What's My Name" | 2023 | Oui Kim (Oui) | 3:34 | |

== Awards and nominations ==
Name of the award ceremony, year presented, award category, nominee(s) and the result of the award
| Award ceremony | Year | Category | Nominee/work | Result | Ref. |
|---|---|---|---|---|---|
| Hanteo Music Awards | 2023 | Special Award – Virtual Artist | Mave: | Nominated | |

== See also ==
- Naevis – South Korean virtual idol
