= Eternity (group) =

South Korea virtual idol group

IITERNITI
- Origin: Seoul, South Korea
- Genres: K-pop
- Years active: 2021-present
- Label: Pulse9
- Members: Seoa; Sujin; Minji; Zae-in; Hyejin; Dain; Chorong; Jiwoo; Yeoreum; Sarang; Yejin
- Website: aian-official.com

IITERNITI (Korean: 이터니티; RR: Iteoniti; formerly: ETERNITY) is a South Korean virtual band formed by Pulse9. The group debuted on March 22, 2021, with the single "I'm Real". The group consists of 11 members: Seoa, Sujin, Minji, Zae-in, Hyejin, Dain, Chorong, Jiwoo, Yeoreum, Sarang and Yejin. They are created with artificial intelligence technology, Deep Real.

== History ==
On March 22, 2021, IITERNITI released their debut single "I'm Real", sung by Hyejin, Seoa, Yeoreum, Sujin and Minji.

On August 25 and 26, Pulse9 released the teasers of sixth member, Dain's solo debut single "No Filter", and released the song on August 27.

On September 19, 2023, it was confirmed that Eternity has rebranded to IITERNITI through IITERNITI's official Discord message.

== Members ==
- Yeoreum (여름) - leader, vocalist
- Minji (민지) - rapper, dancer
- Hyejin (혜진) - rapper
- Seoa (서아)
- Sujin (수진) - vocalist
- Dain (다인)
- Chorong (초롱)
- Zae-In (제인) - rapper
- Jiwoo (지우)
- Sarang (사랑)
- Yejin (예진)

== Discography ==
=== Singles ===
Title	Year	Recorded by
"I'm Real"	2021	Hyejin, Seoa, Yeoreum, Sujin and Minji
"No Filter"	2021	Dain
"Paradise"	2022	Sarang, Zae-In and Yejin
"DTDTGMGN"	2022	Chorong and Jiwoo
"Snow holiday 3:50pm"	2022	Jane
"Wen Moon"	2023	All

== See also ==
- Aespa
