= Rei Tachibana =

Japanese footballer

Personal information
- Date of birth: 25 May 1993 (age 33)
- Place of birth: Aichi Prefecture, Japan
- Height: 1.63 m (5 ft 4 in)
- Position: Midfielder

Team information
- Current team: Chifure AS Elfen Saitama
- Number: 18

Youth career
- EL nińo de MIWA

Senior career*
Years	Team	Apps	(Gls)
- NGU Loveledge Nagoya
- KIU Charme
- NHK Spring Yokohama FC Seagulls
2021–	Chifure AS Elfen Saitama	1	(0)
- * Club domestic league appearances and goals

Rei Tachibana (born 25 May 1993) is a Japanese professional footballer who plays as a midfielder for WE League club Chifure AS Elfen Saitama.

== Career ==
Tachibana made her WE League debut on 12 September 2021.
