= Naevis =

South Korean virtual idol

- Promotional image of Naevis

Background information
- Origin: South Korea
- Genre: K-pop
- Years active: 2020–present
- Label: SM Entertainment
- Website: Official website

Naevis (Korean: 나이비스; stylized as nævis) is a virtual idol created by South Korean entertainment company SM Entertainment as part of the company's SM Culture Universe. Created using generative AI, Naevis first appeared in 2020 in universe-building content for K-pop girl group Aespa and their debut single "Black Mamba". After appearing with Aespa numerous times, Naevis's role expanded to be independent of the group in 2024 with the release of her first single "Done".

== Background and development ==
Development on Naevis first began in 2017 as part of a research and development project at SM Entertainment, and was accelerated during the COVID-19 pandemic as the metaverse concept began to grow. Naevis's voice is AI synthesized, while visuals, including music videos, short-form videos, photos and merchandise, are created in partnership with LG Uplus, utilizing the company's Ixi-Gen generative AI product, a small-scale language model based on LG AI Research's Exaone software.

Naevis is not based on any one person, with her voice being created from a mix of samples taken from voice actors.

== Appearances ==
=== 2020–2023: Establishment in Kwangya ===
Within the SM Culture Universe, Naevis has been described as "Aespa's sidekick" in Kwangya, a digital world in a parallel dimension. Naevis helps the group fight the fictional supervillain Black Mamba.

Naevis was first introduced in October 2020 in a video featuring Aespa member Karina entitled My, Karina. The character later appears in Aespa's music videos for "Next Level" and "Savage", both in 2021, as well as 2022's "Girls". In January 2023, SM revealed that they planned to expand Naevis's role, becoming a virtual idol releasing her own music. At the same time, it was announced that Naevis would make her musical debut as part of a virtual reality concert held at South by Southwest that March; however, the plans did not come to fruition.

Naevis's voice was first heard on Aespa's "Welcome to My World". The song, which was originally meant to be sung solely by Naevis, was released in May 2023 as part of the group's third EP My World. Naevis also appeared in the song's music video, following the group as a mysterious aura as they embark on a road trip. Naevis's solo debut was again announced by SM in August 2023, then scheduled for the first quarter of 2024.

=== 2024–present: Expansion beyond Aespa ===
In June 2024, Naevis appeared as part of Aespa's Synk: Parallel Line tour. Final confirmation of Naevis's solo debut in the third quarter of 2024 came on August 8, when SM released their plans for the final two quarters of 2024. Further details came on August 21, with SM launching an official website and social media channels, as well as releasing a teaser video onto their official YouTube channel depicting rows of computer code reading "Naevis is coming to the real world", followed by a silhouette of the character.

Naevis's debut single, "Done", was announced on September 3. The song, and its music video depicting Naevis entering the real world and exploring an urban setting, were released on September 10.

In October 2024, Naevis acted as an ambassador for the Seoul Design Foundation's annual conference. At the event, a video of Naevis performing "Done" was exhibited, as well as an interview between the character and Seoul mayor Oh Se-hoon. In SM's third quarter 2024 earnings report published in early November, the company confirmed plans to release extended play for Naevis in the first quarter of 2025. Plans for further appearances were announced in December, with SM and Munhwa Broadcasting Corporation signing an agreement to co-develop new content for Naevis, including appearances on MBC's Show! Music Core.

== Reception ==
Naevis received a mixed reception from fans. While some found the AI generated graphics to be impressive, others found the combination of what appeared to be edited footage of a real person dancing with an AI face swapped to be unsettling. The need for SM Entertainment to launch a virtual idol in the first place was also questioned, with some stating that Naevis's AI synthesized voice sounded like a combination of Aespa members, and preferring that Naevis's songs be sung by Aespa instead.

== Discography ==
=== Singles ===
List of songs, showing year released, selected peak positions, sales figures, and name of the album
Title	Year	Peak chart positions			Album
Title	Year	KOR	SGP	VIE	Album
As a lead artist
"Done"	2024	— (Note: "Done" did not enter Circle Digital Chart, but peaked at position 105 on Circle Download Chart.)	—	—	Non-album singles
"Sensitive"	2025	— (Note: "Sensitive" did not enter Circle Digital Chart, but peaked at position 193 on Circle Download Chart.)	—	—	Non-album singles
As a featured artist
"Welcome to My World" (Aespa featuring Naevis)	2023	68	— (Note: "Welcome to My World" did not enter RIAS Top Streaming Chart, but peaked at position 26 on RIAS Top Regional Chart.)	63	My World
"—" denotes releases that did not chart or were not released in that region.

=== Music videos ===
Title	Year	Director	Ref.
"Welcome to My World"	2023	Bang Jae-yeob	
"Done"	2024	Seo Dong-hyuk (Flipevil)	
"Sensitive"	2025	Yoo Sol	

== Filmography ==
=== Music video appearances ===
Title	Year	Artist	Notes	Ref.
"My, Karina"	2020	Aespa	Teaser video	
"Next Level"	2021	Aespa	Music video	
"Savage"	2021	Aespa	Music video	
"Girls"	2022	Aespa	Music video	
"Welcome to My World"	2023	Aespa	Music video	

== See also ==
- Mave: – South Korean virtual girl group
- K/DA: virtual girl group
- Plave: virtual boy group
