= Ananova =

Web-oriented news service

Ananova's character, which was discontinued in 2004

Ananova was a web-oriented news service that originally featured a computer-simulated newscaster named Ananova programmed to read newscasts to users 24 hours a day. Ananova became a subsidiary of mobile telecommunication operator Orange S.A., after it was purchased from the Press Association (PA) in a £95m deal in 2000, after which it was merged into the Orange main news site. The character Ananova was retired in 2004, but the website continued to provide written news articles until 2009.

== History ==
Ananova was developed by a division of the Press Association, a United Kingdom news agency. The character was devised as a virtual news presenter who would read news stories on demand via computer or mobile phone. Ananova was launched in April 2000.

The Press Association soon renamed the division Ananova Ltd. and put the group up for sale. In July 2000, Ananova Ltd. was purchased by the French telecommunications company Orange S.A. as part of a £95m deal.

The animated Ananova character was unavailable from 2004, though the Ananova website was still operational and providing written news items until 2009. In April 2010, Orange decided to scrap the name Ananova. Users entering the site ananova.com are now redirected to a Web Hosting Service Directory. Between April 2010 and April 2015 Ananova was known as Orange News. The Orange version of the news service finished with the end of Orange on-line identity.

The Ananova news service was known for its collection of unusual news stories, which it featured in its Quirkies section.

The site was frequently referenced by Karl Pilkington in the Ricky Gervais Show.

== Character ==
The character of Ananova was given a distinctive look and personality based on celebrities Victoria Beckham, Kylie Minogue, and Carol Vorderman. She appeared as a white female with a thin, toned body. Ananova sported short "unnaturally green" hair and was always seen in make-up. Her creators described her as a 28-year-old "girl about town" who stands at 173 cm (5.7 ft) tall and loves the band Oasis and the TV show The Simpsons.

Ananova's creators stated the original incarnation of the character was a prototype, and in the future they intended "to allow every individual to customize Ananova, right down to age, race and gender." The character was launched in April 2000 from a press conference in London. A significant portion of Ananova's official website was dedicated to detailed fictions regarding the character's personality.

== Speech synthesis ==
The speech synthesis used by Ananova was developed using patented methods that applied human inflections to extend the rVoice solution from Rhetorical Systems (now Nuance Communications).

== See also ==
- Kyoko Date
- Mya (program)
- T-Babe
