= Mya (program) =

Discontinued intelligent personal assistant by Motorola

- Developer: Motorola
- Release: Unreleased
- Type: Intelligent personal assistant
- Website: mya.com (defunct)

Mya was an intelligent personal assistant under development by Motorola in the year 2000. Proposed features for the program included the ability to read emails and answer questions 24 hours a day. Mya was intended to work with an internet service Motorola was developing called Myosphere, and was planned to be a paid service that would eventually be used by other mobile carriers. A female computer-generated character was created to represent Mya in advertising. While the quality of the character's animation was praised, it received criticism for being over sexualised.

Both the character and the program were announced to the public via an advertisement in March 2000, though the program was not ready for use at that time. Despite the announcement generating a considerable amount of attention, little was heard regarding the project in subsequent months. The program was never officially released nor cancelled, though the trademarks for both Myosphere and Mya were abandoned by Motorola in 2002. The name Mya was believed to be a play on the words 'My assistant'.

== Proposed features and development ==
The Internet service that Mya was developed for was called Myosphere. Motorola began development of Myosphere in 1998, and it had been described as a speech enabled service "which enables consumers to manage and control wireless and wireline communications from a single point of access using natural voice commands." Several other companies had already announced plans for similar software at the time; Alan Reiter from Wireless Internet and Mobile Computing was puzzled at Motorola's announcement of Myosphere, saying "They're kind of late to the [voice activation] party. But the party is likely to be very big. ... Motorola's entry will help further legitimize the value of voice response systems. But it's a tough market, and it will take time." The term myosphere was "a play on the theme of connecting the elements of an individual's world, or sphere."

Intended to provide a human-like interface to the Internet, Mya was to be accessed via a toll-free telephone number and a pin code. The program was designed to work with any phone, including landlines, but primarily for mobiles, and was to be accessible 24 hours a day. Mya was said to be able to answer questions on topics such as stock prices, news, sports, weather conditions, traffic, airline reservations, addresses, and appointments, as well as being able to call contacts in a mobile phone's address book.

Intended to be a paid service that would be ready by December 2000, Motorola hoped that Mya would also eventually be used on Palm Pilot and by other mobile carriers. In July 2000 Motorola was reported to be planning to work with Nuance Communications to internationalize Mya, and that same month BellSouth was declared to be the first carrier to buy the service. According to an article in Popular Science in August 2000, Motorola was spending "millions of dollars" on both the Mya character and the program. Mya was originally programmed only for English, though by April 2001 the program was being developed in six languages, and additionally Nippon Telegraph and Telephone were said to be working with Motorola to develop a Japanese version. Mya was voiced by actress Gabrielle Carteris, and mechanically altered to sound more digital.

== Character ==
To create a commercial for Mya, Motorola hired the McCann Erickson company, who in turn hired Digital Domain to create the character. The design was described as a "big-budget" production, though Digital Domain were only given three months to complete the project. Mya's physical representation: a tall, thin, blonde, blue-eyed white female, was created in the likeness of a human model, Michelle Holgate. The initial inspiration for Mya came from vintage pin-up girls. The first representation of Mya had a very small waist and large breasts, and was said to resemble Jessica Rabbit, which did not impress either Motorola or McCann Erickson. Motorola asked Digital Domain to make Mya look as human as possible yet still be obviously artificial. The first completed iteration of Mya was so realistic that Motorola asked for her to be made more obviously digital. Viewers were reportedly not impressed with Mya, because they thought she was a real person. Digital Domain visual effects supervisor and animation director, Fred Raimondi, decided to remodel Mya's appearance to be "just to the left of real".

You know how when you first looked at Max Headroom and were like 'What is that?' That's [the effect] we were after.

— Fred Raimondi

Mya's hair was changed from brunette to bleach blonde. Her short spiky hair style was said to resemble that of Serena Altschul. According to Digital Domain, giving Mya hair that was longer than ear-length was not possible in the time they had been given, due to the difficulties of creating digital photorealistic hair. Mya's final body shape was an almost exact copy of the original model's measurements. Mya was typically seen wearing a silver pantsuit but also appeared in halter tops in some shots and dressed in an evening gown for her debut. While Digital Domain staff wanted Mya to appear in a knee-length skirt with high boots, Motorola and McCann chose the pantsuit, due to its contemporary look.

Digital Domain chose not to use motion capture for Mya's movements as they believed it would constrain the character too much. Instead they used rotoscoping to place their digital character over the real model. The evening gown Motorola selected for Mya to debut in was described by Digital Domain as the most difficult item of clothing they could have chosen, due to its transparency and layering. To render 150 frames (equating to 5–6 seconds of actual footage) of Mya moving in the gown in low-resolution required approximately 6 hours of processing time; the final high-resolution shots took longer. Mya's rendering was so complex she crashed the computers at Digital Domain several times. Mya's creators said they had difficulty making Mya appear as if she were "alive", and focused intensely on movements, specular highlights and eye blinks in order to "bring her to life". The specular highlights also had the intended effect of making Mya shine in an inhuman manner; when the light hit Mya at certain angles, a rainbow would appear. Mya's skin was described as "part china doll, part disco ball." Her distinct shine was based on that of a china plate that the commercial's director, Alex Proyas, had bought in Australia. In some shots of Mya, images were deliberately downgraded and had scan lines added to make the character appear more artificial.

Mya's visual representation, however, appeared solely during advertising and on her website. Only her voice was to be heard when using the actual program. Demonstrations of Mya's abilities and images of the character could be viewed at the now defunct website, mya.com. Raimondi said he believed the name Mya was a play on the words 'My assistant', as did Sidney Matrix in the book Cyberpop: Digital Lifestyles and Commodity Culture.

== Debut and appearances ==
Mya as she appears in a commercial

Mya made her debut on March 26, 2000 in a 60-second advertisement shown during the 72nd Academy Awards. The ad featured Mya dressed in her evening gown and wearing a headset. In the ad Mya steps out of a stretch limousine and walks down the red carpet for the show. The ad declared Mya to be "the darling of the e-world, the 24-hour talking Internet" and stated that Mya's abilities would change users' lives. Despite making her first advertising appearance in March, the Mya program was not scheduled to be ready until December 2000.

Mya subsequently received considerable media attention, and was featured on the front covers of USA Today, InStyle, Wired and Adbusters. One promotion for Mya showed Hugh Hefner sitting in a limousine with two Playboy Bunnies, asking Mya to read him his emails.

The Mya program was on display at the Motorola wireless booth at COMDEX in April 2000, which was visited by then president Bill Clinton. Mya "chok[ed] up halfway" through a demonstration for the president and had to be restarted.

In 2006, Sidney Matrix stated Mya "disappeared" after her debut commercial; in August 2000, a Yankee Group vice-president stated the debut advertisement for Mya was a "great ad, but where have [Motorola] gone with it? ... The spot drove viewers to its website to demo the product ... but failed to market Mya further." Mya was never documented to have been released, nor was there an announcement of the program's cancellation; Motorola abandoned their trademark for 'Mya' on September 19, 2002 and their trademark for 'Myosphere' on December 1, 2002.

== Reception ==
=== Character ===
The reception of the character was mixed. Libby Callaway from New York Post stated Mya was one of their favourite "virtual babes", and said she threatened to take Lara Croft's title as the internet's most popular pin-up girl, also describing Mya as "the world's first 'cyber assistant'". Whilst admitting that the character of Mya was visually appealing, John Sullivan of Wireless Insider also stated that Motorola "went overboard" by trying to give the Mya program a character in the hopes she would become a celebrity in her own right, and accused Motorola of trying to mimic the success of Lara Croft. Mya was described in the 2003 book Data Made Flesh: Embodying Information as "by far" the best-rendered and most self-assured digital woman. Noah Robischon from Entertainment Weekly called her debut the second creepiest moment at that year's Academy Awards (the first being Angelina Jolie kissing her brother).

Writing in Popular Mechanics, Tobey Grumet described Mya as a male-chauvinistic creation, and she was cited in the 2006 book Physical Culture, Power, and the Body as an example of simulated sexualised females. Sidney Matrix stated that Mya's seductive appearance and sultry voice "depended on, borrowed from and retrench[ed] sexist stereotypes", and accused Motorola of normalising the assumption that technology users are both male and heterosexual. Motorola's marketing director Julie Roth defended the design of Mya's appearance and voice, attributing it to market research of what would appeal to users.

Mya's character was often compared to the female computer-simulated character for Ananova, a web-based news service that was being developed around the same time.

=== Announced program ===
Though Mya's character was generally regarded as impressive, the underlying technology was described by Peggy Albright in Wireless Week as not surprising; Albright said Motorola was "latest company in recent weeks to introduce a voice-activated virtual assistant", as Mya was announced shortly after Microsoft had announced their MiPad, and Lucent had launched their Mobile Voice Activated Dialing software. However, Tobey Grummet spoke highly of the program in anticipation of its release, and Mya was described by Elliot Drucker of Wireless Week as a solution to the limitations of accessing the Internet on a mobile phone, without a keyboard or large colour display. While regarding the program with interest, John Sullivan doubted that Mya would persuade people who were not already on the Internet to start using it, and stated that if Mya could only read emails and not actually converse with him, he would rather just read his emails himself. Dawn Chmielewski from the Orange County Register called Mya a "crude interpretation of things to come", noting that speech technology at the time was not without its limitations.

You need to speak like a BBC broadcaster to be understood and use the vocabulary of a toddler to get what you want.

— Dawn Chmielewski

The program won the "Most Innovative Telephony Application" award at the 20th Annual AVIOS Conference in April 2001.
