= The Magic Key (song) =

Single by One-T + Cool-T

from the album The One-T ODC
- B-side: "The Travoltino Club"
- Released: 8 April 2003
- Genre: Electronic, hip-hop
- Length: 3:49
- Label: Universal, Polydor
- Songwriters: Thomas Pieds, Eddy Gronfier
- Producers: Thomas Pieds, Eddy Gronfier

One-T + Cool-T singles chronology
"Bein' a Star" (2002)	"The Magic Key" (2003)	"Starsky & Hutch" (2004)

"The Magic Key" is a 2003 hip-hop/electronic song recorded by French virtual band One-T + Cool-T. It was the third single from the album The One-T ODC and was released in April 2003. The song samples "Má Hra" (1971 album Nová Syntéza) by Blue Effect, a Czechoslovak progressive rock band.

It was the third most played songs on European radio and television during the third quarter of 2003 and performed one of the longest-running singles in the 2003 French SNEP Singles Charts (41 weeks), peaking at #9. The song was also a top five hit in Denmark, Poland, Germany and Austria, and a top ten hit in Belgium (Wallonia) and Switzerland. To date, it remains One-T's most successful single.

The singer behind Cool-T (rap) is Christine Asamoah.

== Music video ==
An animated music video was also released, featuring the characters on the single cover.

== Other versions ==
In 2015, a French version titled "DJ" featuring the chorus and samples of the song has been released by the French singer Dieselle.

In 2022, a musical based on the story of the song and music video premiered at the Kammertheater in Stuttgart.

== Track listings ==
CD single

1. "The Magic Key" – 3:49
2. "The Travoltino Club" – 4:00

CD maxi

1. "The Magic Key" (radio edit) – 3:50
2. "The Magic Key" (club mix) – 6:42
3. "The Magic Key" (extended mix) – 6:05
4. "The Magic Key" (instrumental) – 3:51
5. "The Magic Key" (a capella) – 3:25

12" maxi

1. "The Magic Key" (radio edit) – 3:50
2. "The Magic Key" (club mix) – 6:42
3. "The Magic Key" (extended mix) – 6:05
4. "The Magic Key" (instrumental) – 3:51
5. "The Magic Key" (a capella) – 3:25

== Credits ==
- Featuring by Cool-T
- Co-produced by Proedit
- Produced by Minor T

== Charts ==
=== Weekly charts ===
Weekly chart performance for "The Magic Key"
Chart (2003–2004)	Peak position
Austria (Ö3 Austria Top 40)	5
Belgium (Ultratop 50 Flanders)	34
Belgium (Ultratop 50 Wallonia)	9
Denmark (Tracklisten)	4
France (SNEP)	9
Germany (GfK)	5
Hungary (Dance Top 40)	18
Hungary (Editors' Choice Top 40)	23
Italy (FIMI)	37
Poland (Polish Airplay Chart)	5
Switzerland (Schweizer Hitparade)	7

=== Year-end charts ===
Year-end chart performance for "The Magic Key"
Chart (2003)	Position
Austria (Ö3 Austria Top 40)	35
Belgium (Ultratop Wallonia)	43
France (SNEP)	22
Germany (Official German Charts)	23
Switzerland (Schweizer Hitparade)	16

== Certifications ==
Certifications for "The Magic Key"
Country	Certification	Date	Sales certified
France	Gold	October 28, 2003	250,000
Germany	Gold	2003	150,000
