= SM Culture Universe =

Shared universe produced by SM Entertainment

- Created by: SM Entertainment
- Owner: SM Entertainment
- Years: 2020–present

The SM Culture Universe (SMCU) is a shared universe created by SM Entertainment that connects its artists through a unified storyline. Introduced in the early 2020s, it combines music, virtual characters, and digital storytelling to create an interconnected narrative across different groups. The concept is especially shown through projects like Aespa, which feature both real and virtual members interacting across multiple worlds. This approach emphasizes storytelling as a central element of the universe, described as “the main point is not religion, but storytelling”.

== Development ==
"We are now going to kwangya. We are also going through a turbulent fourth industrial revolution in which not only COVID-19 but also other diseases and climate change can occur at any time. In the future, there will be more changes in human lifestyle as technology advances, and as I said before, the future world will become a world of celebrities and robots. We mentioned SM Culture Universe (SMCU) as a key value and vision for the future entertainment world, and we will introduce new girl group Aespa as the first project that will soon open the beginning of future entertainment."

— Lee Soo-man, Producer, and Chairman of SM Entertainment, on constructing a shared universe.

By 2004, SM Entertainment had been working to produce their own culture universe. During the planning stage, Lee Soo-man thought of creating a worldview with "innovative and powerful" storytelling. He presumed that creating, delivering stories, and entering the worldview is a competition. Instead of a worldview interpreted as a symbol or a metaphor, they created storytelling content that contains a completely "new and very attractive" character and story, and Lee believed that this story is an essential element for expressing artists and music, and is the key to success.

Lee Soo-man attended the First World Cultural Industry Forum (WCIF) as a representative of Korean culture and gave a keynote speech under the theme of "The Future of the World Entertainment Industry After COVID-19 and Culture Universe". In one of the highlights on his speech, Lee stated that they are one step closer to the future entertainment world they have dreamed of. He added that in the year 2020, they would realize SMCU as a vision for the future entertainment world, through the new girl group Aespa, and move forward with "new and innovative" ways as they had done so far.

On November 11, 2020, Park Jun-young, the executive director of SM Entertainment, attended the UAM Seoul Demonstration and Drone Taxi Demonstration Flight Event "City, Open the Sky" hosted by the Ministry of Land, Infrastructure and Transport and the Seoul Metropolitan Government. Park explained the importance of cultural technology in the future mobility industry. It was stated that SM has continued to challenge convergence of culture and technology under the future vision of Lee Soo-man and has been preparing for the future as a "technology company" that goes beyond entertainment. Lee mentioned SMCU as the "core value and vision" of SM. He asserted that it aims to "create a culture-connected entertainment world" and is preparing to predict that the future will be a world of AI and celebrity.

On November 12, 2020, Lee Sung-soo, the CEO of SM Entertainment, together with Choi Si-won, a Super Junior member, attended the Korea-World Chinese Entrepreneurs Business Week 2020 for Chinese businessmen around the world on behalf of the Korean cultural industry. It was held simultaneously around the world as a real-time online forum and was broadcast on YouTube due to COVID-19 concerns. Choi addressed SMCU as the "core value and vision of future entertainment" presented by SM. He presented that SMCU is "not just a worldview" that is interpreted as a symbol or a metaphor, but a "new vision and project" to express artists and music through storytelling content that contains "attractive" characters and stories. Choi talked about Aespa as the "beginning" of the SMCU project, and added that the worldview and stories of various groups such as Exo, Red Velvet, and NCT will unfold independently and sometimes connect to new stories. Additionally, he added that Super Junior is also part of SMCU and hopes that people will see what different stories the group will unfold in the future.

On June 23, 2021, SM Entertainment and Korea Advanced Institute of Science and Technology (KAIST) signed a memorandum of understanding (MoU) for a joint metaverse study. Previously, Lee Soo-man had teamed up with Marvel, Creative Artists Agency, and Intel, among other global companies, to make the culture universe. Through the MoU, SM and KAIST plans to mutually carry out technological cooperation in fields such as content, artificial intelligence and robots, common projects related to digital avatar production, and collective academic research on Culture Technology (CT). Through the joint research with KAIST's College of Culture and Technology, SM will focus on researching metaverse performance technology using avatars. Based on the collaboration, KAIST and SM plans to carry out research that seeks both the "perfection" of performances and the "advancement" of technology.

On June 29, 2021, SM Entertainment held SM Congress 2021 to announce SM's vision and strategy. Lee Soo-man opened the event through stating that SM has "continued the challenge to create an experience" that was never before with music content. He explained that the metaverse era will be recognized for its "originality and will become more valuable" in the future. Furthermore, Lee said that they have predicted, prepared and pioneered the future. Lee told Aespa that they are "stepping out in earnest to a world" where they expand their worldview under the name of SM Culture Universe and create their own universe. Moreover, SM announced further details regarding SMCU such as potential plans for films, applications, and games that would allow for fan interaction.

On July 1, 2021, the Second WCIF was held in the form of an international seminar involving key figures from five countries including South Korea, the United States, China, Japan, and India. Under the theme of "Changes in the Music and Entertainment Industry in the Post COVID Era", Lee Soo-man, Metro-Goldwyn-Mayer's chairman Mark Burnett, who produced famous audition programs The Voice and Survivor, and Teddy Zee, who has more than 30 years of experience in Hollywood, will be delivering their keynote speeches. Lee asserted on his keynote speech that "unexpected" fields should fuse with entertainment, be able to create "explosive synergy", and that Korea should become the "first mover". Moreover, he said that in the future, the content that would be drawing attention should be the supposed "recreative content" that users can recreate and claimed that the content can be a "third currency". Lee added that it will be an agenda that they wanted to share with the cultural and future industry leaders as well as K-pop.

== Media ==
=== Comics ===
Title	Publication date(s)		Writer(s)	Artist(s)	Ref.
Title	First published	Last published	Writer(s)	Artist(s)	Ref.
SMCU : Red Velvet - The Story of ReVe	November 9, 2022	November 11, 2022	Kim Aromi	D D Kang	

== Projects ==
=== Aespa ===
It was announced that the SM Entertainment will introduce a new girl group, Aespa, which will be the first project for SMCU. Lee Soo-man revealed that once the group is released to the world, people will experience "new" entertainment through "attractive" stories in addition to all Intellectual Property Rights (IP), visuals and performances, including their music, lyrics, and video content including the music video. Lee have mentioned Aespa's storytelling in which artist members in the "real world" and avatar members in the "virtual world" communicate, interact, and grow through the "digital world", an intermediate world between reality and virtual reality. In addition, he described a new concept group with a "groundbreaking" identity to work together in reality in which the members of the "real world", the avatar members and the mysterious beings in the "virtual world", who supports and assists them, are members of Aespa. Lee furtherly presented their plan of a "completely new concept" of storytelling to which "real world" members and "virtual world" members have artificial intelligence (AI) brains as different organisms.

=== CAWMAN ===
Cartoon, Animation, Webtoon, Motion Graphics, Avatar, and Novel (CAWMAN) is a new mixed video genre to portray SM Culture Universe (SMCU). Lee Soo-man hinted that there are talks about making a movie in Hollywood using the genre.

=== Related terminologies ===
List of SM Culture Universe terminologies
Name	Description	Ref.
Ae (stylized as æ)	The online avatars of Aespa that have been created from all of the data that the members have uploaded on the internet	
Black Mamba	The threat to the world and disrupts the connection between the real subject and the virtual reality avatar	
Ether	The sea of unconsciousness	
Flat	A virtual world where people and their "aes" coexist with each other	
Kosmo	An unknown world that appears in the worldview of Aespa and NCT	
Kwangya (Korean: 광야; lit. 'Wilderness')	A parallel dimension where the "Black Mamba" resides and the "ae" exists	
My	A key figure in the story which means "the most precious friend" in "Kwangya"	
Naevis (stylized as nævis)	An artificial intelligence system and a mysterious being which connects Aespa and the avatar in the virtual world	
Nu Evo	The new evolution	
Synk	A virtual platform wherein Aespa and their avatars are connected	
SynkOut	The forced disconnection with the "ae"	
Rekall	The process where an avatar can come out for a limited time in the real world	
P.O.S (Port of Soul)	Allows Aespa and their "aes" to "Synk" or hang out together in the real world	

== Recurring cast and characters ==
List of recurring cast and characters
Character	Artist or Group
TBA	Kangta
Birth of Universe	BoA
Speed of Light and Sound	TVXQ
Space Travel Beyond Nationality and Ownership	Super Junior
Goddess of Sound	Girls' Generation
Five Lights	Shinee
Supernatural Powers	Exo
Transcendental Beings that are in Communion with the Gods	Red Velvet
Messengers of Solidarity through Dreams and Subsconsciousness	NCT
TBA	Aespa

== Reception ==
Gong Mi-na of StarNews noted the project for containing SM Entertainment's "accumulated technology" and "know-how" which is expected to become the new model for K-pop market. Gong also praised SM for the consistent application of "cutting-edge technology" to K-pop and introducing contents that has "advanced to the next level". Kim Sun-woo of Sports Seoul recognized SM's signaling of an "expanded worldview" that will "exceed" expectations, adding a statement from an official on the music industry, "The idea of avatar is fresh, but the key seems to be how collaboration will be achieved and how much bond it can form with fans". Lee Jae-hoon of Newsis labeled SM's various experiments as building a "cultural empire" and is compared its similarity with Marvel Cinematic Universe which also creates contents with diverse world views with IPs. Jung Yu-jin of SPOTV News reported that the industry is interested in Aespa's avatar worldview, describing it as "groundbreaking". Jang Jin-ri from the same news media stated that it remains as SM's attempt to become a "cultural empire" beyond an entertainment company representing Korea. Kim Do-heon of OhmyStar compared the SMCU to Marvel Universe because of its resemblance with building a virtual worldview.
