= Saki Fujita =

Japanese voice actress from Tokyo (born 1984)

- 藤田 咲
- Born: Sakiko Fujita (藤田 咲子); October 19, 1984 (age 42); Tokyo, Japan
- Occupation: Voice actress
- Years active: 2005–present
- Agent: Arts Vision
- Known for: Hatsune Miku (voice sampling)
- Height: 153 cm (5 ft 0 in)

Sakiko Fujita (藤田 咲子, Fujita Sakiko; born October 19, 1984), known professionally as Saki Fujita (藤田 咲, Fujita Saki), is a Japanese voice actress. She is best known for voicing Akagi in Kantai Collection, Ayano Sugiura in YuruYuri, Yukari Kotozume/Cure Macaron in Kirakira PreCure a la Mode, Torako Koshi in My Deer Friend Nokotan, and providing the main voice samples for the Vocaloid software Hatsune Miku.

Fujita also sang the ending theme to Tokimeki Memorial Only Love, "Kiseki no Kakera", (奇跡のかけら) along with Yuki Makishima and Yukako Yoshikawa, and the opening songs for Working!! – Someone Else, Coolish Walk, Now!!!Gamble with Kana Asumi and Eri Kitamura.

== Filmography ==
=== Anime series ===
2005

- Akahori Gedou Hour Rabuge (Maid)
- Happy Seven ~The TV Manga~ (Tomomi Sasaki)
- Shuffle! – (A schoolgirl)
- Speed Grapher (Kozue Kokubunji)

2006

- Tokimeki Memorial Only Love (Mina Yayoi)
- Tsuyokiss Cool×Sweet (Kinu Kanisawa)
- Yoshinaga-san Chi no Gargoyle (Momo Katagiri, Rimu)(*)

2007

- Gakuen Utopia Manabi Straight! (Momoha Odori)

2008

- Akiba-chan (Milk-chan)
- Kamen no Maid Guy (Elizabeth K. Strawberryfield)
- Zoku Sayonara Zetsubō Sensei (ep 13) (Hatsune Miku)
- Yozakura Quartet (Ao Nanami)

2009

- Chrome Shelled Regios (Munfa Rufa)
- Heaven's Lost Property (Tomoko)

2010

- Angel Beats! (Hitomi)
- Durarara!! (Ruri Hijiribe)
- Heaven's Lost Property: Forte (Tomoko)
- Night Raid 1931 (Fuu Lan)
- Ōkami Kakushi (Kuzumi Mana)
- Working!! (Mahiru Inami)
- The Legend of the Legendary Heroes (Milk Kallaud)

2011

- Jewelpet Sunshine (DonaDona)
- SKET Dance (Chika, Chuutarou Oozora, Haruko, Mariko Satonaka, Yamako Hanada)
- Working'!! (Mahiru Inami)
- YuruYuri (Ayano Sugiura)

2012

- Battle Spirits: Heroes (Kimari Tatsumi)
- Chōsoku Henkei Gyrozetter (Haruka)
- Jewelpet Kira☆Deco! (DonaDona)
- Sankarea: Undying Love (Natsukawa)
- YuruYuri♪♪ (Ayano Sugiura)

2013

- A Town Where You Live (Rin Eba)
- Arpeggio of Blue Steel -Ars Nova- (Hyūga)
- Attack on Titan (Ymir)
- Devils and Realist (Jeanne d'Arc)
- Koroshiya-san: The Hired Gun (Chichi no Kataki Onna)
- Muromi-san (Otohime)
- Pocket Monsters: Best Wishes! Season 2: Episode N (Verbena)
- Yozakura Quartet: Hana no Uta (Ao Nanami)

2014

- Dragon Collection (Pennetta)
- Engaged to the Unidentified (Konoha Suetsugi)
- Girl Friend Beta (Tomo Oshii)
- Gundam Build Fighters Try (Shia Kijima)
- Log Horizon 2 (Lasphere)
- Magical Warfare (Hotaru Kumagai)
- Sakura Trick (Mitsuki Sonoda)
- Sword Art Online II (Skuld)

2015

- Assassination Classroom (Ritsu)
- Attack on Titan: Junior High (Ymir)
- Durarara!!x2 (Ruri Hijiribe)
- Go! Princess PreCure (Chieri)
- Kantai Collection (Akagi)
- Rampo Kitan: Game of Laplace (Minami)
- Wish Upon the Pleiades (Nanako)
- Working!! (Mahiru Inami)
- YuruYuri Nachuyachumi! + (Ayano Sugiura)
- YuruYuri San Hai! (Ayano Sugiura)

2016

- Brave Witches (Fumika Kitagou)
- Danganronpa 3: The End of Kibōgamine Gakuen (Seiko Kimura)
- Haven't You Heard? I'm Sakamoto (Tanaka)
- New Game! (Yamada)

2017

- Attack on Titan Season 2 (Ymir)
- Armed Girl's Machiavellism (Kyoubou, Doumou and Eva Maria Rose)
- King's Game The Animation (Aya Kuramoto)
- Kirakira PreCure a la Mode (Yukari Kotozume/Cure Macaron)
- New Game!! (Yamada)
- Seiren (Yukie Takato)

2018

- Conception (Femiruna)
- Cardcaptor Sakura: Clear Card (Rika Sasaki, replacing Tomoko Kawakami)
- Shinkansen Henkei Robo Shinkalion (Hatsune Miku)
- Hugtto! PreCure (Yukari Kotozume/Cure Macaron)

2019

- Attack on Titan Season 3 (Ymir)
- Boruto (Remon Yoimura)

2021

- Yashahime: Princess Half-Demon - The Second Act (Rion)

2022

- Birdie Wing: Golf Girls' Story (Ichina Saotome)
- KanColle: Someday in that Sea (Fusou, Yamashiro, Yukikaze, Suzutsuki, Shiranui)
- Dropkick on My Devil! X (Hatsune Miku)

2024

- My Deer Friend Nokotan (Torako Koshi/Koshitan)

=== Anime films ===
- Jewelpet the Movie: Sweets Dance Princess (2012) (Coron, DonaDona)
- KanColle: The Movie (2016) (Akagi, Tokitsukaze)
- Pretty Cure Dream Stars! (2017) (Yukari Kotozume/Cure Macaron)
- Kirakira PreCure a la Mode the Movie: Crisply! The Memory of Mille-feuille! (2017) (Yukari Kotozume/Cure Macaron)
- Pretty Cure Super Stars! (2018) (Yukari Kotozume/Cure Macaron)
- Violence Voyager (2019) (Yoshiko)
- Colorful Stage! The Movie: A Miku Who Can't Sing (2025) (Hatsune Miku)

=== Original video animation ===
- Hiyokoi (2010) (Ritsuka Nakano)
- Mayo Elle Otoko no Ko (2010) (Tamazusa Shirogane)
- Baby Princess 3D Paradise 0 Love (2011) (Tsurara Amatsuka)
- Ai Mai! Moe Can Change! (2012) (Ai Server, Mi Server)
- Namiuchigiwa no Muromi-san: Pangea Chou Tairiku no Muromi-san (2013) (Otohime)
- YuruYuri Nachuyachumi! (2014) (Ayano Sugiura)
- Armed Girl's Machiavellism (2017) (Kyoubou)
- Yuru Yuri, (2019) (Ayano Sugiura)

=== Original net animation ===
- Wish Upon the Pleiades (2011) (Nanako)
- Cyclops Shōjo Saipu (2013) (Rin Fujisaki)
- Koro-sensei Quest! (2016) (Ritsu)
- MiniYuri (2019) (Ayano Sugiura)
- Yakitori: Soldiers of Misfortune (2023) (Hatsune Mimi)

=== Video games ===
2006

- Tokimeki Memorial Online (Mina Yayoi/ PC online game)

2007

- Gakuen Utopia Manabi Straight! Kira Kira☆Happy Festa! (Momoha Odori/ PS2 game)

2009

- Agarest Senki Zero (Alice)
- Hatsune Miku: Project DIVA (Hatsune Miku)

2010

- Agarest Senki Zero: Dawn of War (Alice)
- Hatsune Miku: Project DIVA Arcade (Hatsune Miku)
- Hatsune Miku: Project DIVA 2nd (Hatsune Miku)

2011

- Rune Factory Oceans (Quinn)
- Nora to Toki no Kōbō: Kiri no Mori no Majo (Mellow)
- Hatsune Miku: Project DIVA Extend (Hatsune Miku)

2012

- Tales of Innocence (QQ Selesneva)
- Street Fighter X Tekken (Elena)
- Hatsune Miku and Future Stars: Project Mirai (Hatsune Miku)
- Miku Flick (Hatsune Miku)
- Miku Flick/02 (Hatsune Miku)
- Hatsune Miku: Project DIVA F (Hatsune Miku)

2013

- Super Robot Wars UX (Fei-Yen HD, Hatsune Miku)
- Kantai Collection
  - Ship girl: Akagi, Fusou, Yamashiro, Kagerou, Shiranui, Kuroshio, Yukikaze, Tokitsukaze, Suzutsuki, Kaiboukan No.4, I-47
  - Abyssals: Aircraft Carrier Demon, Aircraft Carrier Princess, Aircraft Carrier Summer Demon, Aircraft Carrier Summer Princess, Entombed Anti-Air Guardian Princess, Gotou Islands Seabed Princess, Night Strait Princesses
- Hatsune Miku: Project Mirai 2 (Hatsune Miku)

2014

- Ultra Street Fighter IV (Elena)
- Hatsune Miku: Project DIVA F 2nd (Hatsune Miku)

2015

- BlazBlue Chrono Phantasma Extend (Cajun Faycott)

2016

- Digimon World: Next Order (Shiki)
- Hatsune Miku: Project DIVA X (Hatsune Miku)

2018

- Grand Chase: Dimensional Chaser (Lydia Norwood, Dark Nephilim)

2019

- Destiny Child Global (Hatsune Miku, Snow Miku, Princess Snow Miku)
- Arknights (Yato)
- Lilycle Rainbow Stage!!! (Seira Hitsuji)
- Variable Barricade (Hibari Tojo)

2020

- Hatsune Miku: Project DIVA Mega Mix (Hatsune Miku)
- Hatsune Miku: Colorful Stage! (Hatsune Miku)

2021

- Gate of Nightmares (Abigail)

2022

- Blue Archive (Hatsune Miku)
- Bleach: Brave Souls (Picaro, Urozakuro)

2025

- Street Fighter 6 (Elena)
- Wuthering Waves (Phrolova)
- Sonic Racing: CrossWorlds (Hatsune Miku)

2026

- Deltarune Chapter 5 (Pink, Hatsune Miku)

=== Drama CD ===
- Strobe Edge (2008) (Noriko)
- The Demon Prince of Momochi House (2014) (Himari Momochi)
- The Demon Prince of Momochi House Part 2 (2015) (Himari Momochi)
- The Demon Prince of Momochi House Part 3 (2015) (Himari Momochi)
