= Asami Shimoda =

Japanese actress

- 下田 麻美
- Born: January 30, 1986 (age 40); Tottori Prefecture, Japan
- Other name: Kaori Hanano
- Occupations: Actress; voice actress; singer
- Years active: 2008–present
- Agent: Arts Vision
- Notable work: The Idolmaster as Futami twins Voice provider for Kagamine Rin/Len

Asami Shimoda (下田 麻美, Shimoda Asami; born January 30, 1986) is a Japanese actress and voice actress. Her best known roles include the Futami twins in The Idolmaster, and Kagamine Rin and Len in the Vocaloid Crypton Future Media's Character Vocal Series. In the adult game, such as Tayutama, she used the name Kaori Hanano (花野香, Hanano Kaori). Shimoda is also a singer. She released her first mini album in 2010. Two years later, she released "Awake", her debut maxi single, which was released under 5pb. records.

== Filmography ==
=== Television animation ===
List of voice performances in animation
Year	Title	Role	Notes	Ref.
2008	Kyō no Go no Ni	Chika Koizumi		
2009	Tayutama: Kiss on my Deity	Ameri Kawai		
2010	B Gata H Kei	Chika Yamada		
2010	Seitokai Yakuindomo	Kotomi Tsuda		
2011	Infinite Stratos	Huang Lingyin		
2011	Nekogami Yaoyorozu	Hasumi Shirasaki		
2011	The IDOLM@STER	Ami Futami		
2011	The IDOLM@STER	Mami Futami		
2012	Cardfight!! Vanguard: Asia Circuit Hen	Lee Shenlon		
2012	Good Luck Girl!	Ryūta Tsuwabuki		
2012	Oniai	Haruomi Ginbei Sawatari		
2013	Cuticle Tantei Inaba	Yūta Sasaki		
2013	Infinite Stratos 2	Huang Lingyin		
2013	Ro-Kyu-Bu! SS	Nana Yotsuya		
2013	Shingeki no Kyojin	Nanaba		
2014	Dragonar Academy	Anya		
2014	Futsū no Joshikōsei ga Locodol Yattemita	Saori Nishifukai		
2014	Momo Kyun Sword	Kushinoda		
2014	Seitokai Yakuindomo	Kotomi Tsuda		
2016	Kiss Him, Not Me	Amane Nakano		
2017	Shingeki no Kyojin Season 2	Nanaba		
2025	Colorful Stage! The Movie: A Miku Who Can't Sing	Kagamine Rin & Len		

=== Original video animation (OVA) ===
- The Idolmaster Live For You! (2008), Ami Futami and Mami Futami
- Aika Zero (2009), Kana Shiraishi

=== Original net animation (ONA) ===
- Puchimas! Petit Idolmaster (2013), Ami and Mami Futami, and Koami and Komami

=== Films ===
- Book Girl (2010), Kurara Mori

=== Video games ===
- Higurashi When They Cry video games (2007-2015), Madoka Minai
- The Idolmaster (2007), Ami and Mami Futami
- GetAmped2 (2008), Dolores
- Cosmic Break (2008), various characters
- The Idolmaster Live For You! (2008), Ami and Mami Futami
- Hatsune Miku: Project Diva (2009), Kagamine Rin, Len
- Hatsune Miku: Project Diva Arcade (2010), Kagamine Rin, Len
- Hatsune Miku: Project Diva 2nd (2010), Kagamine Rin, Len
- The Idolmaster 2 (2011), Ami and Mami Futami
- The Idolmaster Cinderella Girls (2011), Ami and Mami Futami
- Hatsune Miku: Project Diva Extend (2011), Kagamine Rin, Len
- Black Rock Shooter The Game (2011), Nafhe
- Hatsune Miku and Future Stars: Project Mirai (2012), Kagamine Rin, Len
- DoDonPachi SaiDaiOuJou (2012), Operator
- Hatsune Miku: Project Diva F (2012), Kagamine Rin, Len
- The Idolmaster Shiny Festa (2012), Ami and Mami Futami
- Fairy Fencer F (2013), Pipin
- Killer Is Dead (2013), Alice
- Hatsune Miku: Project Mirai 2 (2013), Kagamine Rin, Len
- Hatsune Miku: Project DIVA Arcade Future Tone (2013), Kagamine Rin, Len
- Hatsune Miku: Project Diva F 2nd (2014), Kagamine Rin, Len
- The Idolmaster One For All (2014), Ami and Mami Futami
- Super Heroine Chronicle (2014), Huang Lingyin
- Hatsune Miku: Project Mirai DX (2015), Kagamine Rin, Len
- Hatsune Miku: Project Diva X (2016), Kagamine Rin, Len
- Hatsune Miku: Project Diva Future Tone (2016), Kagamine Rin, Len
- The Idolmaster Platinum Stars (2016), Ami and Mami Futami
- Infinite Stratos: Archetype Breaker (2017), Huang Lingyin
- The Idolmaster: Stella Stage (2017), Ami and Mami Futami
- Azur Lane (2017), Universal Bulin, Trial Bulin MKII, Specialized Bulin Custom MKIII
- Princess Connect Re:Dive (2018), Matsuri Orihara (Matsuri)
- Arknights (2019), Lancet-2, Vigna
- Hatsune Miku: Project Diva Mega Mix (2020), Kagamine Rin, Len
- Hatsune Miku: Colorful Stage! (2020), Kagamine Rin, Len
- The Idolmaster: Starlit Season (2021), Ami and Mami Futami
- Girls' Frontline (2022), Fo-12
- Etheria: Restart (2025), Kloss

== Discography ==
=== Albums ===
- Dreams (2010)
- Fan appreciation CD link (2012)

=== Singles ===
- "Awake" (2012)
