= Marza Animation Planet =

Japanese animation studio

Marza Animation Planet Inc.

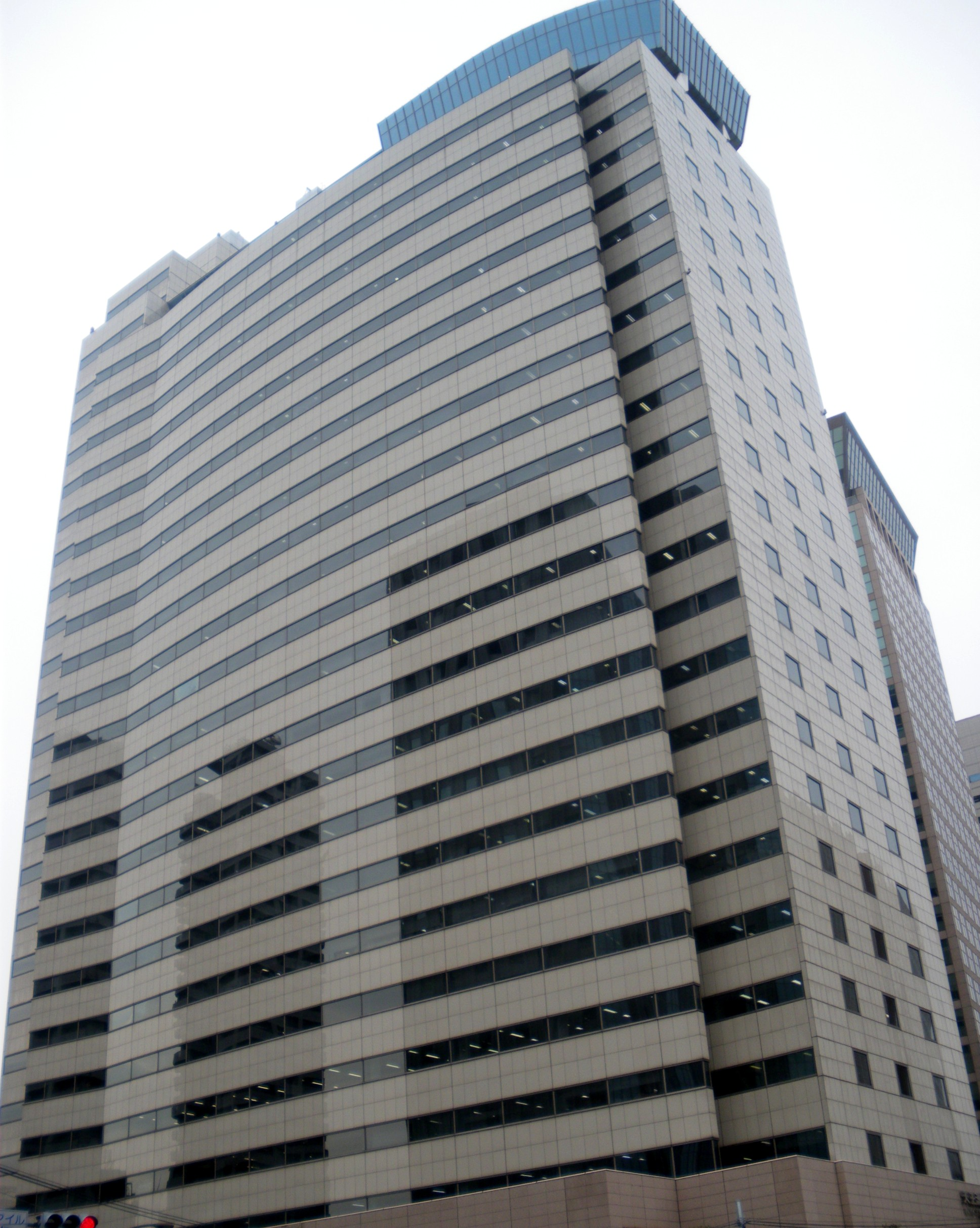
- Headquarters in Shinagawa, Tokyo
- Native name: 株式会社マーザ・アニメーションプラネット
- Romanized name: Kabushiki gaisha Māza Animēshonpuranetto
- Formerly: Sega VE Animation Studio (2005–2009); Sega Sammy Visual Entertainment Inc. (2009–2010)
- Type: Subsidiary
- Industry: Animation
- Founded: January 21, 2005; 21 years ago
- Headquarters: Higashi-Shinagawa, Shinagawa, Tokyo, Japan
- Key people: Shuji Utsumi (chairman of the board); Haruho Uchida (president & representative director)
- Owner: Sega Corporation (2005-2009); Sega Sammy Holdings (2009-2015); Sega Holdings (2015-2017); TMS Entertainment (2017-2023); Sega Corporation (2023-present)
- Number of employees: 150
- Parent: Sega
- Divisions: Marza Animation Planet USA Inc.
- Website: marza.com/en/

Marza Animation Planet Inc. (株式会社マーザ・アニメーションプラネット, Kabushiki gaisha Māza Animēshonpuranetto) is a Japanese animation studio that specializes in producing computer-animated sequences for television series and video games. Their head office is located on the 18th floor of the Tennoz Ocean Square (天王洲オーシャンスクエア, Tennōzu Ōshan Sukuea) in Higashi-Shinagawa, Shinagawa, Tokyo, near Tennozu Isle Station.

The company was formed through Sega spinning off its CGI division, and is best known for making the cutscenes for the Sonic the Hedgehog games. Marza Animation Planet is also known for producing the Sonic the Hedgehog film series (2020–present) and Chi's Sweet Adventure.

== Animation Technology ==
Marza Animation Planet has presented internal production tools at SIGGRAPH and SIGGRAPH Asia. In 2023, Marza presented the studio's Time Filter system, an animation timing tool designed to give computer animation 2D-style timing control. In 2025, ShapeMeshing, a Marza-developed procedural framework for converting 2D animated drawings into sculpted 3D meshes, was presented at SIGGRAPH Asia 2025.

== Films ==
Year	Title	Director	Co-produced with	Distributor
2013	Space Pirate Captain Harlock	Shinji Aramaki	Toei Animation	Toei Company
2016	Kingsglaive: Final Fantasy XV	Takeshi Nozue	Visual Works	Aniplex
2017	Resident Evil: Vendetta	Takanori Tsujimoto	Capcom	Kadokawa (Japan); Sony Pictures Entertainment
2019	Lupin III: The First	Takashi Yamazaki	TMS Entertainment	Toho
2020	Sonic the Hedgehog	Jeff Fowler	Original Film; Blur Studio; Sega	Paramount Pictures
2022	Sonic the Hedgehog 2	Jeff Fowler	Original Film; Blur Studio; Sega	Paramount Pictures
2024	Sonic the Hedgehog 3	Jeff Fowler	Original Film; Blur Studio; Sega	Paramount Pictures
2025	Tabekko Dobutsu	Hitoshi Takekiyo	Klockworx Co., Ltd. and TBS TV	Klockworx Co., Ltd. and TBS TV

== Short films ==
- Sonic: Night of the Werehog (2008)
- GAMERA (2015) (In association with Omnibus Japan and Kadokawa.) (Note: Made in conmemoration of the 50th anniversary of the franchise.)
- The Gift (2016) (Created using Unity)
- The Peak (2019) (Created using Unity)
- Sonic Drone Home (2022)
- Samurai Frog Golf (2022)
- Ghost Tale (2023)
- Robodog (discontinued project)

== Video game cutscenes ==
- Virtua Fighter 5 (2006)
- Sonic Riders (2006)
- Oshare Majo: Love and Berry (2007)
- Nights: Journey of Dreams (2007)
- Sonic Riders: Zero Gravity (2008)
- Phantasy Star Portable (2008)
- Samba de Amigo (2008)
- Sonic Unleashed (2008)
- Hatsune Miku: Project DIVA (2009)
- Phantasy Star Portable 2 (2009)
- Resonance of Fate (2010)
- Super Monkey Ball: Step & Roll (2010)
- Hatsune Miku: Project DIVA 2nd (2010)
- Sengoku Taisen (2010)
- Sonic Colors (2010)
- Sonic Free Riders (2010)
- Virtua Tennis 4 (2011)
- Sonic Generations (2011)
- Super Monkey Ball: Banana Splitz (2012)
- Phantasy Star Online 2 (2012)
- Hatsune Miku: Project DIVA F (2012)
- Kingdom Conquest II (2013)
- Phantasy Star Online 2 2nd OP (2012)
- Demon Tribe (2013)
- Sonic & All-Stars Racing Transformed (2012)
- Phantasy Star Online 2 3rd OP (2012)
- Sonic Lost World (2013)
- The World of Three Kingdoms (2013)
- Hatsune Miku: Project DIVA F 2nd (2014)
- Phantasy Star Nova (2014)
- Yakuza 0 (2015)
- Hatsune Miku: Project DIVA X (2016)
- VR Zone Shinjuku - Winged Bicycle (2017)
- Resident Evil Vandetta: Z Infected Experience (2017)
- Sonic Forces (2017)
- Team Sonic Racing (2019)
- Mario & Sonic at the Olympic Games Tokyo 2020 (2019)
- Sonic Frontiers (2022)
- Shadow Generations (2024)
- Sonic Racing: CrossWorlds (2025)
- Star Fox (2026)

== Other ==
- Hatsune Miku Live Party 2012 (MIKUPA♪) (2012) (Stage event)
- Hatsune Miku Magical Mirai 2013 (2013) (Stage event)
- Mario Kart 8 (2014 (original), 2017 (Deluxe)) (3-D models for artwork illustration)
- Hatsune Miku Magical Mirai 2014 (2014) (Stage event)
- Splatoon (2015) (3-D models for artwork illustration)
- Happy Forest (2015) (Tech Demo Trailer created using Unreal Engine 4)
- Chi's Sweet Adventure (2016) (animation, models, lighting, ect. under director Kiminori Kusano)
- Hatsune Miku Expo 2016 (2016) (Stage event)
- Ultimate Bowl (2015 (v1), 2017 (v2)) (Tech Demo Trailer created using Unreal Engine 4 (v1) and Unity (v2))
- Splatoon 2 (2017) (3-D models for artwork illustration)
- The Last Guardian (2016) (Animations)
- Ninjala (2020) (Animations)
- Paper Mario: The Origami King (2020) (Lighting)
- Earwig and the Witch (2020) (Production partner)
- Oni: Thunder God's Tale (2022) (Animation)
- Paper Mario: The Thousand-Year Door (2024) (Lighting)
- Hatsune Miku Expo 10th Anniversary (2024) (Stage event, partial production of character modeling, set-up, and animation)
