= Hatsune Miku: Project Diva X =

2016 video game

Hatsune Miku: Project DIVA X
- North American PlayStation 4 cover art
- Developers: Sega; Crypton Future Media
- Publisher: Sega
- Series: Hatsune Miku: Project DIVA
- Platforms: PlayStation Vita, PlayStation 4
- Release: PlayStation Vita: JP: March 24, 2016; NA: August 30, 2016; EU: August 30, 2016; PlayStation 4: JP: August 25, 2016; NA: August 30, 2016; EU: August 30, 2016
- Genre: Rhythm game
- Mode: Single-player

Hatsune Miku: Project DIVA X (初音ミク -Project DIVA- X) is a 2016 rhythm game featuring the character Hatsune Miku, created by Sega and Crypton Future Media, released on March 24, 2016 for the PlayStation Vita in Japan. A PlayStation 4 version known in Japan as Hatsune Miku: Project DIVA X HD (初音ミク -Project DIVA- X HD) was released on August 25, 2016. North American and European versions were released for PlayStation 4 and PlayStation Vita on August 30, 2016. The title reflects the game being the 10th entry in the Hatsune Miku: Project DIVA series (including the Dreamy Theater games and both versions of Hatsune Miku: Project DIVA F). The game takes a new approach to play style, focusing around the theme of "Live and Produce".

== Development ==
The game was publicly announced on August 31, 2015 via a video preview.

The character modules are designed by Tokichi, Akiakane, Tama, iXima, Hachi, Hoshima, Amemura, PinocchioP, Awashima, Gagame, 456, Suzunosuke, Saine, Nagimiso, toi8, and Rella. The full original cast from the previous game is present in Project DIVA X, with KAITO and MEIKO now taking on appearances from their Vocaloid 3 versions.

== Gameplay ==
The core gameplay is of a similar play style to Hatsune Miku: Project DIVA F, removing the double star notes and link stars introduced in Hatsune Miku: Project DIVA F 2nd. The game also introduces "rush notes", for which the player is to rapidly press the corresponding button in order to increase their score. A new "Cloud Request / Live Quest" mode takes center focus over the traditional free play mode. The game now centers around the "home" menu, which is an adapted version of earlier titles "diva room", where the player can interact with the Vocaloids. "Home" also replaces the traditional main menu. As in Project Diva F 2nd, lyric subtitles can be shown in either Japanese (Kanji or Romaji), English or Chinese, depending on the version.

Cloud Request / Live Quest Mode involves the player completing quests by playing songs. In between missions, short interactions and visual novel style dialogues may play out between the player and Vocaloids. The mode consists of two main types of quests - Cloud Requests / Area Quests and Event Requests / Event Quests. Cloud Requests / Area Quests simply require a song to be completed while gaining a certain score. Later quests throw in other challenges (such as the "cool" pop up randomly changing to "miss" and "sad"). Event Requests / Event Quests have special requirements such as requiring the player to play a "festival / special live" consisting of 3 songs in a row. The game also features new "medley" songs, which are fully playable compilations of popular returning and new tracks. The full versions of the songs comprising the medleys cannot be played in full.

In Cloud Request / Live Quest Mode, modules (costumes), accessories and songs are assigned an aura / element, either Classic / Neutral, Cool, Cute, Elegant / Beauty, or Quirky / Chaos. These elements also correspond to the 5 "areas" the songs are sorted within. By matching songs with a module and accessories of the same element, the initial "voltage" its Skylanders elements system is increased. Modules are also assigned skills, for example, increasing the voltage for every 20 notes hit. The voltage increases the score gained for each successful note. The "Diva Points" used in previous entries have been removed, as modules are now acquired through a new feature called "Module Drop". Module Drop is triggered by the success of chance time, causing a random module to be dropped. Certain modules are classified as "rare" and may only drop during certain quests. If the conditions of the quest are cleared, the player acquires the module and is then able to freely use it in both Live Quest and Free Play modes. Previously obtained modules may still drop during quests.

In Free Play mode, the player is able to customize the modules, stage and module dropped. Elements and skills are absent in this mode. Free Play mode follows the traditional scoring system of previous Project Diva games where the player must build up Grade Points to acquire a ranking of Standard, Great, Excellent or Perfect, as opposed to reaching a voltage goal alike to the Live Quest mode. Certain extra DLC characters may only be used in Free Play mode. Other modes include "Concert Editor / Live Edit" in which the player is able to customize camera angles and effects of full versions of the songs included in the game, with support for PlayStation VR. The game does not feature a traditional edit mode and custom song edits cannot be made. "Portrait / Photo" mode returns from Project Diva F 2nd, allowing the player to take pictures of the Vocaloids.

== Song list ==
The base game contains 30 playable songs, 6 of which are medleys, and 4 of which return from previous entries in the Hatsune Miku: Project DIVA or Project Mirai series. The game also has 2 DLC songs released after launch that are available for purchase on the PlayStation Store

Song List
Song name	Performed by	Producer
Classic Cloud / Neutral Area
The First Sound (ハジメテノオト, Hajimete no Oto)	Hatsune Miku	malo
Love Song (愛の詩, Ai no Uta)	Hatsune Miku	Lamaze-P
Satisfaction	Hatsune Miku	kz
Name of the Sin (罪の名前, Tsumi no Namae)	Hatsune Miku	ryo
Beginning Medley - Primary Colors (はじまりのメドレー 〜プライマリーカラーズ〜, Hajimari no Medoree ~Puraimarii Karaazu~): Vocaloid in Love (恋するVOC@LOID, Koisuru VOC@LOID); Dreaming Leaf (ユメミルコトノハ, Yumemiru Kotonoha); Moody Waltz (フキゲンワルツ, Fukigen Warutsu); Miracle Paint (ミラクルペイント, Mirakuru Peinto)	Hatsune Miku; Kagamine Rin; Kagamine Len; Megurine Luka; MEIKO; KAITO	OSTER project
Ending Medley - Ultimate Exquisite Rampage (終極のメドレー ～超絶技巧暴走組曲～, Shuukyoku no Medley ~Chouzetsu Gikou Bousou Kumikyoku~): The Disappearance of Hatsune Miku (初音ミクの消失, Hatsune Miku no Shoushitsu); Two-Faced Lovers (裏表ラバーズ, Ura-omote Lovers); Sadistic Music∞Factory; 2D Dream Fever (二次元ドリームフィーバー, Nijigen Doriimu Fiibaa); The Intense Voice of Hatsune Miku (初音ミクの激唱, Hatsune Miku no Gekishou)	Hatsune Miku	cosMo@Bousou P PolyphonicBranch wowaka Arranged by cosMo@Bousou P
Cute Cloud / Cute Area
Tale of the Deep-sea Lily (ウミユリ海底譚, Umiyuri Kaiteitan)	Hatsune Miku	n-buna
LOL -lots of laugh-	Hatsune Miku	mikumix
Even a Kunoichi Needs Love (クノイチでも恋がしたい, Kunoichi Demo Koi ga Shitai)	Hatsune Miku; Kagamine Rin	Mikito-P
Patchwork Staccato (ツギハギスタッカート, Tsugihagi Sutakkaato)	Hatsune Miku	Toa
Love Trial (恋愛裁判, Ren'ai Saiban)	Hatsune Miku	40meterP
Cute Medley - Idol Sounds (キュート・メドレー ～アイドル サウンヅ～, Kyuuto・Medoree ~Aidoru Saundzu~): Eazy Dance (イージーデンス, Iijii Densu); FREELY TOMORROW; Viva Happy (ビバハピ, Biba Hapi); Hyped Again (アゲアゲアゲイン, Age Age Agein); Blooming The Idol (アイドルを咲かせ, Aidoru o Sakase)	Hatsune Miku	Mitchie M
Cool Cloud / Cool Area
Strangers	Hatsune Miku	Heavenz
Raspberry*Monster (ラズベリー＊モンスター, Razuberii*Monsutaa)	Hatsune Miku	HoneyWorks
The Lost One's Weeping (ロストワンの号哭, Rosuto Wan no Goukoku)	Kagamine Rin	Neru
Calc.	Hatsune Miku	Jimmythumb-P
Solitary Envy (独りんぼエンヴィー, Hitorinbo Envi)	Hatsune Miku	Denpol-P
Cool Medley - Cyber Rock Jam (クール・メドレー 〜サイバーロックジャム〜, Kuuru・medoree ~Saiba Rokku Jamu~): Unhappy Refrain (アンハッピーリフレイン, Anhappii Rifurein); Don't My List Me! (マイリスダメー！, Mairisu Damee!); Tengaku (天樂, Tengaku); Palette; This Crazy Wonderful World is For Me (このふざけた素晴らしき世界は、僕の為にある, Kono Fuzaketa Subarashiki Sekai wa, Boku no Tame ni Aru)	Hatsune Miku; Kagamine Rin; Megurine Luka	DIVELAxOsamu wowaka Live-P; Yuuyu; Yuyoyuppe n.k Arranged by DIVELA Manipulated by Kou (Osamu)
Elegant Cloud / Beauty Area
Brain Revolution Girl (脳内革命ガール, Nounai Kakumei Gaaru)	Hatsune Miku	MARETU
Holy Lance Explosion Boy (聖槍爆裂ボーイ, Seisou Bakuretsu Booi)	Kagamine Len	rerulili x moja
A Single Red Leaf (紅一葉, Akahitoha)	Megurine Luka	Kurousa P
Amazing Dolce	MEIKO; Kagamine Rin; Kagamine Len	Hitoshizuku×Yama△
Ai Dee (愛Dee)	Hatsune Miku; Megurine Luka	Mitchie M
Elegant Medley - Glossy Mixture (ビューティ・メドレー 〜グロッシーミクスチャー〜, Byuuti・Medoree ~Gurosshii Mikusuchaa~; Beauty Medley - Glossy Mixture): Dependence Intention; Sweet Devil; Nebula; Chaining Intention	Hatsune Miku; Megurine Luka; MEIKO	Treow; Hachioji-P; Tripshots Arranged by Treow
Quirky Cloud / Chaos Area
Slow Motion (すろぉもぉしょん, Suroomooshon)	Hatsune Miku	Pinocchio-P
Streaming Heart (ストリーミングハート, Sutoriimingu Haato)	Hatsune Miku	DECO*27
Humorous Dream of Mrs. Pumpkin (Mrs.Pumpkinの滑稽な夢, Mrs.Pumpkin no Kokkei na Yume)	Hatsune Miku	Hachi
Babylon (バビロン, Babiron)	Hatsune Miku	Tohma
Urotander, Underhanded Rangers (卑怯戦隊うろたんだー, Hikyou Sentai Urotandaa)	KAITO; MEIKO; Hatsune Miku	Shin P
Quirky Medley - Giga-Remix (カオス・メドレー 〜ギガリミックス〜, Kaosu・Medoree ~Giga Rimikkusu~; Chaos Medley - Giga-Remix): Pincostique Luv (ぴんこすてぃっくLuv, Pinkosutikku Luv); Gigantic O.T.N (ギガンティックO.T.N, Gigantikku O.T.N); Kiddie War (おこちゃま戦争, Okochama Sensou); 1 2 Fan Club (いーあるふぁんくらぶ, Ii Aru Fankurabu)	Kagamine Rin; Kagamine Len; Hatsune Miku	Giga-P×Reol; MikitoP Arranged by Giga-P
Extra Cloud / Extra Area (DLC)
Hand in Hand	Hatsune Miku	kz
Sharing The World	Hatsune Miku	BIGHEAD, ELEKI

== Controversy ==
Hatsune Miku: Project DIVA X was banned in South Korea due to the song "Holy Lance Explosion Boy" containing sexually implicit lyrics.

== Reception ==
Hatsune Miku: Project DIVA X received generally favorable reviews. Critics praised the game for its Live Quest story mode and visuals, but criticized the game's "lack of content"; being its song selection (without DLC), lack of an in-game shop, and having to play the game's story mode repeatedly to unlock modules via Module Drop sequences.

The game received a 78% score on Metacritic.
