= Kloß =

Kloß (ß is a double s) may refer to:

- Kloß, the German word for dumpling, also known by the regional term Knödel
- Kloss, a German surname
