= Miku Flick/02 =

2012 video game

- Developers: Sega; Crypton Future Media
- Publisher: Sega
- Series: Hatsune Miku: Project DIVA
- Platform: iOS
- Release: WW: August 10, 2012
- Genre: Rhythm game
- Mode: Single-player

Miku Flick/02 (ミクフリック/02) was a 2012 rhythm game created by Sega and Crypton Future Media for the iOS operating systems iPhone, iPad and iPod Touch. The game was a sequel to Miku Flick, released earlier that year, and a spin off of the Hatsune Miku: Project DIVA series of Vocaloid rhythm games. Like the original, the game primarily makes use of Vocaloids, a series of singing synthesizer software, and the songs created using these vocaloids, most notably the virtual-diva Vocaloid Hatsune Miku. The game was released internationally on August 10, 2012, making it the second Project Diva game to be released in English.

Support for the game ended on July 19, 2016.

== Gameplay ==
Demonstration of the typical gameplay style of Miku Flick/02. Note the addition of a "Interlude Mini-Game" within the gameplay. The pre-rendered PV is playing in the background as well.

The game retained the primary gameplay of its predecessor, whereby the game had 10 tiles, arranged in a 3x3 grid with the middle column having a 4th tile at the bottom, Each of these tiles had a hiragana Lyric on them; when indicated, the player is required to flick the tile in the indicated direction. The lyrics for each song were given above the tiles, and flowed from right to left with a circle on the left. When the indicated lyric reaches the circle, the player had to tap the lyric tile and flick it in the indicated direction. Like the original game, PVs were pre-rendered with graphics of Project DIVA Arcade. The game also retained the "PV Mode" where players can watch the PVs of the various songs.

An additional "interlude Mini-Game" has been added to the game when playing difficulties in Normal and higher difficulties, where the player has to press the eighth note button, when the eighth note approaches the circle, much like how it's done on the primary gameplay.

Unlike its predecessor, the game featured vocaloids other than Hatsune Miku, including Kagamine Rin, Kagamine Len and Megurine Luka as well as duet songs whereby two vocaloids would sing together for a song. The game also included a new "Extreme" difficulty mode, which provided players with a difficulty between that of the "Hard" and "Break the Limit" modes, retained from the original. The game also provided additional Downloadable Content via the In-App Purchases system that would include new songs and seasonal costumes. The additional "Replay Mode" was later added, allowing players to save a replay of their performance and share it with friends.

== Song list ==
There were 10 songs available in the base game, and a total of 74 songs were available post-launch via downloadable content.

Song List
Song Name	Performed By	Producer
Love Is War	Hatsune Miku	ryo
Hajimete no Oto	Hatsune Miku	malo
Meltdown	Kagamine Rin	iroha(sasaki)/kuma(alfred)
Butterfly on Your Right Shoulder	Kagamine Len	Nori-P
Just Be Friends	Megurine Luka	Dixie Flatline
Clover♣Club	Hatsune Miku	Yuuyu
magnet	Hatsune Miku; Megurine Luka	Ryuusei-P
Promise	Hatsune Miku; Kagamine Rin	samfree
Two Faced Lovers	Hatsune Miku	wowaka
The Intense Singing of Hatsune Miku	Hatsune Miku	cosMo
Multiple Future Quartet ~QUARTET THEME~	Hatsune Miku	Kusemono-P
DIVA Pack 01
Kocchi Muite Baby	Hatsune Miku	ryo
Yellow	Hatsune Miku	kz
Colorful X Melody	Hatsune Miku; Kagamine Rin	Team MOER
Duet Pack 01
Cantarella	Hatsune Miku; KAITO	WhiteFlame
Gemini	Kagamine Len; Kagamine Rin	Dixie Flatline
Colorful X Sexy	Megurine Luka; MEIKO	Team MOER
Summer Pack 01
Dear cocoa girls	Hatsune Miku	Kamimae Akira, Hata Aki
No, no Alien	Megurine Luka	Iyaiya-P
Soi Yassa!!	Kagamine Rin; Kagamine Len	Shuujin-P
Dance Pack 01
Miku Miku ni Shite Ageru♪	Hatsune Miku	ika
Luka Luka★Night Fever	Megurine Luka	samfree
Nightmare☆Party Night	Hatsune Miku	Kuchibashi-P
Autumn Pack 01
Tsugai Kogarashi	KAITO; MEIKO	Shigotoshite-P
Gigantic Girl	Hatsune Miku	40meterP
Rin Rin Signal -Append Mix-	Kagamine Rin; Kagamine Len	Dios/Signal-P
Tear Pack 01
Kokoro	Kagamine Rin	Toraboruta-P
VOiCE -DIVA MIX-	Hatsune Miku	Lovely-P
Hinekuremono	Hatsune Miku	ryo
Winter Pack 01
Requiem for the Phantasma	Hatsune Miku	Deadball-P
When the First Love Ends	Hatsune Miku	ryo
Strobe Nights	Hatsune Miku	kz/yae
Guitar Pack 01
Puzzle	Hatsune Miku	Kuwagata-P
Meiteki Cybernetics	Megurine Luka	otetsu
Sekiranun Graffiti	Hatsune Miku	ryo/Dixie Flatline
Japan Pack 01
Jugemu Sequencer	Hatsune Miku	Vocaloid-P
Iroha Song	Kagamine Rin	Ginsaku
Amata no Mai -Dance of many-	Hatsune Miku	Hikutsu-P
Anniversary Pack 01
Yume Yume	Hatsune Miku	Deco*27
Innocence	Hatsune Miku	Kazu-P
World's End Dancehall	Hatsune Miku; Megurine Luka	wowaka
Farewell Pack 01
Honto wa Wakatteru	Hatsune Miku	Funakoshi-P
Uta ni Katachi wa Nai Keredo	Hatsune Miku	doriko
SPiCa -39's Giving Day Edition-	Hatsune Miku	Toku-P/kentax vs Toku-P
Star Pack 01
Double Lariat	Megurine Luka	Agoaniki-P
*HELLO, PLANET. (I.M.PLSE-EDIT)	Hatsune Miku	sasakure.UK
from Y to Y	Hatsune Miku	JimmyThumb-P
Dark Pack 01
Musunde Hiraite Rasetsu to Mukuro	Hatsune Miku	Hachi
Houkai Utahime -disruptive diva-	Hatsune Miku	Machigerita-P
Saa, Docchi?	Kagamine Rin; Kagamine Len	Hinata Haruhana
Lovely Pack 01
Miku Miku-kin ni Gochuui♪	Hatsune Miku	Hayaya-P
Koi Iro Byouto	Hatsune Miku	OSTER project
Nekomimi Switch	Hatsune Miku	daniwellP
Rock Pack 01
Kodoku no Hate -extend edition-	Kagamine Rin; Kagamine Len	Hikari Shuuyou
Rolling Girl	Hatsune Miku	wowaka
Toumei Suisai	Hatsune Miku	Yasuo-P
mirai Pack 01
on the rocks	MEIKO; KAITO	OSTER project
No Logic	Megurine Luka	JimmyThumb-P
Mousou Sketch	Hatsune Miku	40mP
Thankyou Pack 01
The secret garden	Hatsune Miku	Kamimae Akira, Hata Aki
39	Hatsune Miku	sasakure.UK/Deco*27
Sono Ichibyuo Slow Motion	Hatsune Miku	ryo
MikuFlick Pack 01
Romeo and Cinderella	Hatsune Miku	Doriko
Electric Angel	Hatsune Miku	Yasuo
Finder (DSLR remix-re:edit)	Hatsune Miku	kz
MikuFlick Pack 02
Melt	Hatsune Miku	ryo
StargazeR	Hatsune Miku	Kotsuban-P
moon	Hatsune Miku	Hakka + iroha (sasaki)
MikuFlick Pack 03
World Is Mine	Hatsune Miku	ryo
Anata no Utahime	Hatsune Miku	azuma
Time Limit	Hatsune Miku	North-T
MikuFlick Pack 04
PoPiPo	Hatsune Miku	Lamaze-P
Koi Suru VOC@LOID	Hatsune Miku	OSTER Project
Hatsune Miku no Shoushitsu	Hatsune Miku	CosMo

- Songs with a white background are part of the initial song pack that comes with the game at purchase
- Songs with a green background were added to the song list after an update.
- Songs with an orange background are DLC and must be purchased via In-App Purchasing
