= Miku Flick =

2012 video game

- iOS logo
- Developers: Sega; Crypton Future Media
- Publisher: Sega
- Series: Hatsune Miku: Project DIVA
- Platform: iOS
- Release: JP: March 9, 2012; WW: April 9, 2012
- Genre: Rhythm game
- Mode: Single-player

Miku Flick (ミクフリック) was a 2012 rhythm game created by Sega and Crypton Future Media for the iOS operating system for iPhone, iPad and iPod Touch. The game was a spin-off of the Hatsune Miku: Project DIVA series of Vocaloid rhythm games and was released in Japan on March 9, 2012 and internationally on April 9, 2012. Like the original the game primarily makes use of Vocaloids, a series of singing synthesizer software, and the songs created using these vocaloids most notably the virtual-diva Vocaloid Hatsune Miku. Miku Flick was the first game in the Project Diva series to ever be released outside Japan in English. A sequel to the game, named Miku Flick/02 was released on August 10, 2012. On September 29, 2017, the game ended its service and was removed from the App Store, with the official website stating "various circumstances beyond our control" as the reason.

== Gameplay ==
Demonstration of the typical gameplay style of Miku Flick. Note the scoring system present within the gameplay. The pre-rendered PV is playing in the background as well.

As the game was a spin-off from the Project Diva series, its gameplay differs greatly from the original series. The game was still a rhythm game at heart, though its mechanics greatly differ. Players can pick their songs using a Cover Flow system from a selection of 13 songs all sung by Hatsune Miku. This was the first game in the series to not feature any other Vocaloids apart from Hatsune Miku. It was also the first game not to use Promotional Videos (PVs) rendered in real-time, instead the game's PVs are pre-rendered with graphics of Project DIVA Arcade. The game also featured two more modes being "PV" where players can watch the PVs of the various songs in the game and "Break the Limit" whereby it is an even more extreme version of the game.

Within the songs, the gameplay also differs greatly. Focusing more on the lyrics of the song rather than the rhythm and beats. The game has 10 tiles, arranged in a 3×3 grid with the middle column having a 4th tile at the bottom. Each of these tiles has a hiragana Lyric on them, when indicated you are required to flick the tile in the indicated direction. The lyrics for each song are given above the tiles, and flow from right to left with a circle on the left. When the indicated lyric reaches the circle, the player must tap the lyric tile and flick it in the indicated direction. Arrows will automatically appear on the tiles to be flicked so as to make things easier for the player, though this help can be removed via the options. Timing is as essential as the original game as the game still retains the points system as well as accuracy scoring system as the original series. The original Japanese game only provided tiles in hiragana, but the localized version provided romanization support so tiles would have the romanized letters on it, which are alphabets recognizable to English readers.

== Song list ==
The game has a total of 13 songs. Players begin with only 3 songs unlocked, and unlock one new song for every song they complete up to a total of 12 songs. The Disappearance of Hatsune Miku -DEAD END- is unlocked after clearing every song on easy and normal mode. If players manage to clear The Disappearance of Hatsune Miku -DEAD END- on Normal or Hard mode just after the credits, Magical Sound Shower is unlocked, leaving the player with a total of 14 songs.

Song List
| Song name | Producer |
| Loving VOC@LOID (恋スルVOC@LOID, Koisuru VOC@LOID) | OSTER Project |
| moon | iroha(sasaki)【はっか+iroha／iroha】 |
| World is Mine (ワールドイズマイン, Warudo Izu Main) | ryo |
| Time Limit (タイムリミット, Taimu Rimitto) | North-T |
| Finder (DSLR remix - re:edit) (ファインダー (DSLR remix - re:edit), Fainda (DSLR remix - re:edit)) | kz |
| Vegetable Juice (ぽっぴっぽー, PoPiPo) | ラマーズP |
| Melt (メルト, Meruto) | ryo |
| Electric Angel (えれくとりっく・えんじぇぅ, Erekutorikku Enjeu) | ヤスオ |
| Love Words (愛言葉, Ai Kotoba) | Deco*27 |
| Romeo and Cinderella (ロミオとシンデレラ, Romio to Shinderera) | doriko |
| StargazeR | 骨盤P |
| Your Diva (あなたの歌姫, Anata no Utahime) | azuma |
| The Disappearance of Hatsune Miku (初音ミクの消失, Hatsune Miku no Shoushitsu) | CosMo |
| Magical Sound Shower | HIRO (music) & Kusemono-P (lyrics) |
