= Infinite Stratos =

Japanese light novel series and its franchise

- First light novel volume cover, featuring Houki Shinonono

IS〈インフィニット・ストラトス〉 (IS <Infinitto Sutoratosu>)
- Genre: Harem; Mecha; Romantic comedy
- Light novel
- Written by: Izuru Yumizuru
- Illustrated by: Okiura; (vol. 1–7); Choco; (vol. 1–7 reprints, vol. 8–present)
- Published by: Media Factory (vol.1–7); Overlap (vol. 8–present)
- English publisher: J-Novel Club
- Imprint: MF Bunko J (vol. 1–7); Overlap Bunko (vol. 8–present)
- Original run: May 25, 2009 – April 25, 2018 (on hiatus)
- Volumes: 12
Further information
Manga
Written by	Izuru Yumizuru
Illustrated by	Kenji Akahoshi
Published by	Media Factory
Magazine	Monthly Comic Alive
Original run	May 27, 2010 – July 27, 2012
Volumes	5
Anime television series
Directed by	Yasuhito Kikuchi
Written by	Fumihiko Shimo
Music by	Hikaru Nanase
Studio	Eight Bit
Licensed by	AUS: Madman Entertainment; NA: Sentai Filmworks; UK: MVM Films
Original network	TBS, CBC, Sun TV, KBS, BS-TBS
English network	US: Anime Network
Original run	January 7, 2011 – April 1, 2011
Episodes	12
Original video animation
IS <Infinite Stratos> Encore: A Sextet Yearning for Love
Directed by	Yasuhito Kikuchi
Written by	Fumihiko Shimo
Music by	Hikaru Nanase
Studio	Eight Bit
Licensed by	AUS: Madman Entertainment; NA: Sentai Filmworks; UK: MVM Films
Released	December 7, 2011
Runtime	27 minutes
Manga
Written by	Izuru Yumizuru
Illustrated by	Homura Yuuki
Published by	Shogakukan
Magazine	Monthly Sunday Gene-X
Original run	May 18, 2013 – February 19, 2020
Volumes	8
Anime television series
Infinite Stratos 2
Directed by	Shin Tosaka (Note: Credited as Series Director (シリーズディレクター, Shirīzu Direkutā).); Yasuhito Kikuchi
Written by	Izuru Yumizuru
Music by	Hikaru Nanase
Studio	Eight Bit
Licensed by	AUS: Madman Entertainment; NA: Sentai Filmworks; UK: MVM Films
Original network	TBS, Sun TV, CBC, KBS, BS-TBS
Original run	October 4, 2013 – December 20, 2013
Episodes	12
Original video animation
Infinite Stratos 2: Long Vacation Edition
Directed by	Yasuhito Kikuchi
Written by	Izuru Yumizuru
Music by	Hikaru Nanase
Studio	Eight Bit
Licensed by	AUS: Madman Entertainment; NA: Sentai Filmworks; UK: MVM Films
Released	October 30, 2013
Runtime	39 minutes
Original video animation
Infinite Stratos 2: World Purge
Directed by	Shin Tosaka; Yasuhito Kikuchi
Written by	Izuru Yumizuru
Music by	Hikaru Nanase
Studio	Eight Bit
Licensed by	NA: Sentai Filmworks
Released	November 26, 2014
Runtime	45 minutes
- icon

Infinite Stratos, also written as IS <Infinite Stratos> (Japanese: IS〈インフィニット・ストラトス〉, Hepburn: IS <Infinitto Sutoratosu>), is a Japanese light novel series by Izuru Yumizuru with illustrations provided by Okiura (original MF novels) and Choco (new Overlap novels). As of October 2013, seven volumes have been published by Media Factory under their MF Bunko J label. From volume 8 onwards, the novels were published by Overlap under their Overlap Bunko label.

A manga adaptation by Kenji Akahoshi was serialized in the seinen manga magazine Monthly Comic Alive from May 2010 to July 2012 with five volumes published under their Alive Comics imprint. A 12-episode anime television series adaptation produced by Eight Bit aired in Japan between January and March 2011, and an original video animation (OVA) episode was released on December 7, 2011. The anime is licensed by Sentai Filmworks in North America, who released the series in April 2012. A second series aired from October to December 2013.

== Plot ==
In the near future, Japanese scientist Tabane Shinonono creates a high-tech powered exoskeleton called "Infinite Stratos" (IS). Possessing technology and combat capabilities far surpassing that of any other arms system, the IS threatens to destabilize the world. Faced with such an overpowered weapon, the world's nations enact the "Alaska Treaty", stating that ISes shall never be used for military combat purposes, and that the existing IS technology must be equally distributed to all nations, to prevent any one nation from dominating the others. However, sometime after the IS was introduced, society has undergone a drastic change. As ISes can only be operated by women, there is a shift in the power balance between men and women, where women now dominate society over men.

Ten years after the IS was initially introduced, the world has entered a new age of peace. However, a 15-year-old Japanese boy named Ichika Orimura changes everything. During an accidental run-in with a hibernating IS suit, it is revealed that he possesses the innate ability to operate an IS—the only male in the world capable of doing so. Seeing his potential, the Japanese government forcibly enrolls the bewildered young man in the prestigious Infinite Stratos Academy, a multicultural academy where IS pilots from all over the world are trained. Thus, he starts a busy high school life surrounded by girls training to become expert IS pilots. While they seem to be enjoying their thrilling school life, the danger of looming threats and enemies is never too far away.

== Characters ==
=== Main characters ===
Ichika Orimura (織斑 一夏, Orimura Ichika)
Voiced by: Kōki Uchiyama (Japanese); Jessie James Grelle (English)
Ichika Orimura is a first-year student, class representative, and Student Council Vice President at IS Academy. Raised by his older sister Chifuyu Orimura, a legendary IS pilot, after their parents abandoned them, he regrets her forfeiting the Mondo Grosso tournament to rescue him from Phantom Task. As the only male capable of piloting an IS, he becomes a subject of scientific fascination. While appearing indifferent to the affections of those around him, he avoids romantic entanglements to prevent discord. He pilots the Byakushiki (白式), a prototype fourth-generation IS, later enhanced into Byakushiki Setsura (白式雪羅) with advanced weaponry and mobility. His arsenal includes the Yukihira Type 2 (雪片弐型), an upgraded version of Chifuyu's weapon.
Houki Shinonono (篠ノ之 箒, Shinonono Hōki)
Voiced by: Yōko Hikasa (Japanese); Monica Rial (English)
Houki Shinonono is a first-year student at IS Academy and Ichika Orimura's childhood friend, having been separated from him for six years. Raised in a kendo dojo, she is a national-level kendo champion. Her older sister, Tabane Shinonono, invented the IS, though their relationship is strained after Houki's family was placed under government protection, forcing her to withdraw from a tournament—an event that also severed her early promise with Ichika. She harbors lingering affection for him, often reacting jealously to other girls. Initially without a personal IS, she later pilots the Akatsubaki (紅椿), a fourth-generation melee-focused unit equipped with twin katanas, Amatsuki (雨月) and Karaware (空裂). Its signature ability, Kenran Butō (絢爛舞踏), replenishes energy upon contact with other IS units.
Cecilia Alcott (セシリア・オルコット, Seshiria Orukotto)
Voiced by: Yukana (Japanese); Brittney Karbowski (English)
Cecilia Alcott is a first-year student at IS Academy and the Cadet Representative of the United Kingdom. Born into British aristocracy, she inherited her family's fortune after her parents died in a train accident when she was twelve. To protect her assets, she agreed to attend IS Academy as part of a deal with the British government, who sought data on their third-generation IS. Initially arrogant, she relinquished her position as class representative to Ichika Orimura after recognizing his strength. She pilots the Blue Tears (ブルー・ティアーズ), a long-range sniper IS equipped with remote drones (B.I.T.S. System), the Starlight Mark III (スターライトmkIII) laser rifle, and the Interceptor (インターセプター) blade for close combat.
Lingyin Huang (凰 鈴音, Fan Rin'in; pinyin: Huáng Língyīn; "Rin Fan" in the English dub)
Voiced by: Asami Shimoda (Japanese); Hilary Haag (English)
Lingyin Huang is a first-year student at IS Academy and China's Cadet Representative. A childhood friend of Ichika Orimura, she developed feelings for him after he defended her from bullies. Their friendship becomes strained when Ichika forgets a childhood promise tied to her cooking skills. Nicknamed "Ling" (鈴), she comes from a family that ran a Chinese restaurant before her parents' divorce. She pilots the Shenlong (神竜), a short-to-medium range IS equipped with Ryuhou (龍砲) shoulder cannons and the Sōten Gagetsu (双天牙月), twin blades that combine into a naginata-like weapon.
Charlotte Dunois (シャルロット・デュノア, Sharurotto Dyunoa)
Voiced by: Kana Hanazawa (Japanese); Shannon Emerick (English)
Charlotte Dunois is a first-year student at IS Academy and France's Cadet Representative. Initially posing as Charles Dunois (シャルル・デュノア), a male student, she was assigned as Ichika Orimura's roommate to gather data on his IS capabilities. Her true gender is revealed when Ichika accidentally sees her showering. After learning her father's corporation exploited her for espionage, Ichika protects her, leading to her developing feelings for him. She pilots the Rafale Revive Custom II (ラファール・リヴァイヴ・カスタムII), a versatile 2nd-generation IS with interchangeable weapons and Ignition Boost capability. Trained to pose as male, she uses the pronoun boku. Later, she becomes roommates with Laura Bodewig.
Laura Bodewig (ラウラ・ボーデヴィッヒ, Raura Bōdevihhi)
Voiced by: Marina Inoue (Japanese); Tiffany Grant (English)
Laura Bodewig is a first-year student at IS Academy and Germany's genetically-engineered Cadet Representative. As commander of the special forces unit Schwarzer Hase (シュヴァルツェア・ハーゼ), she bears distinctive cybernetic enhancements including a glowing yellow eye concealed by an eyepatch. Originally sent to confront Ichika Orimura over his sister's withdrawal from Mondo Grosso, she later develops feelings for him after he calms her during a berserk state caused by her IS's malfunction. She pilots the Schwarzer Regen (シュヴァルツェア・レーゲン), an artillery-type IS equipped with restraint tethers, a railgun, and an Active Inertial Canceller. Following these events, she declares herself Ichika's protector, referring to him as her "bride" due to cultural misunderstanding.
Tatenashi Sarashiki (更識 楯無, Sarashiki Tatenashi)
Voiced by: Chiwa Saitō (Japanese); Jessica Calvello (English)
Tatenashi Sarashiki is the student council president of IS Academy and Russia's IS Representative. As the 17th leader of the Sarashiki family—a secret organization opposing Phantom Task—she is also the school's strongest pilot. After the Silver Gospel incident, she becomes Ichika Orimura's protector and roommate, often teasing him flirtatiously. She pilots the Mysterious Lady (ミステリアス・レイディ) IS. When Ichika helps activate her sister Kanzashi's IS and saves her from American soldiers, she reveals her true name Katana Sarashiki (更識 刀奈), developing genuine romantic feelings for him. Her playful demeanor hides her serious combat skills and family responsibilities.
Kanzashi Sarashiki (更識 簪, Sarashiki Kanzashi)
Voiced by: Suzuko Mimori (Japanese); Kira Vincent-Davis (English)
Kanzashi Sarashiki is Japan's IS Representative and Tatenashi's younger sister. Despite her position, she initially lacks a personal IS after development of her unit was delayed in favor of Ichika's Byakushiki, creating unwarranted resentment toward him. An anime enthusiast who struggles with self-doubt when compared to her accomplished sister, she eventually receives her operational Uchigane Nishiki (打鉄弐式) IS through Ichika's assistance. This experience helps her overcome her inferiority complex and develop romantic feelings for Ichika, while also gaining new appreciation for her own abilities separate from her sister's shadow.

=== IS Academy staff ===
Chifuyu Orimura (織斑 千冬, Orimura Chifuyu)
Voiced by: Megumi Toyoguchi (Japanese); Luci Christian (English)
Chifuyu Orimura is Ichika's 24-year-old sister and his homeroom teacher at IS Academy. A former legendary IS pilot who once wielded the Yukihira blade (now inherited by Ichika), she retired to raise her brother after their parents abandoned them. Though outwardly indifferent, she deeply cares for Ichika, enrolling him in the academy to protect him from foreign interests. She previously piloted the prototype "White Knight" (白騎士) that famously defended Japan against 2,341 simultaneous missile attacks. Currently using the Kurezakura IS, Chifuyu shares a mysterious past with Tabane Shinonono, Houki's sister, which explains the younger siblings' childhood connection.
Maya Yamada (山田 真耶, Yamada Maya)
Voiced by: Noriko Shitaya (Japanese); Cynthia Martinez (English)
Maya Yamada serves as the substitute instructor for Ichika's class at IS Academy. A former Japanese IS Representative Cadet, she demonstrates exceptional combat skills by defeating both Cecilia Alcott and Lingyin Huang simultaneously during a training exercise—overcoming their personal IS units while piloting only a standard Rafale Revive mass-production model.

=== Phantom Task ===
Madoka Orimura (織斑 マドカ, Orimura Madoka)
Voiced by: Ai Kayano (Japanese); Luci Christian (English)
Madoka Orimura is the long-lost younger twin sister of Chifuyu and Ichika, bearing a striking resemblance to Chifuyu. As the leader of Phantom Task under the codename M, she harbors unresolved resentment toward her siblings. She pilots two advanced IS units: the Silent Zephyrs, a superior variant of Cecilia Alcott's Blue Tears, and later the Black Knight, provided by Tabane Shinonono. It is later discovered that Madoka is not biologically human but was artificially created using Chifuyu's genetic material, intended to serve as her successor. Her motives remain conflicted, torn between her engineered purpose and familial ties.
Squall Meusel (スコール・ミューゼル, Sukōru Myūzeru)
Voiced by: Fumi Hirano (Japanese); Carli Mosier (English)
Squall leads Phantom Task's combat squad as a composed yet formidable operative. She pilots the unique Golden Dawn IS, displaying exceptional combat reflexes and tactical restraint—notably preventing Madoka from excessive violence during operations. While maintaining a polite demeanor, she demonstrates ruthless efficiency when necessary. Her primary mission involves gathering combat data on Ichika Orimura's Byakushiki in its White Knight configuration, though her ultimate objectives remain undisclosed. The technical specifications and generation classification of her Golden Dawn IS are unverified.
Autumn (オータム, Ōtamu)
Voiced by: Yuka Nishigaki (Japanese); Shelley Calene-Black (English)
Autumn is an impulsive Phantom Task operative who attempted to steal Ichika Orimura's Byakushiki during the IS Academy anniversary using a specialized "Remover" device, narrowly thwarted by Tatenashi Sarashiki's intervention. She pilots Arachne, a stolen second-generation American IS featuring an eight-legged mobility system. Notably aggressive in combat, Autumn displays uncharacteristic vulnerability around squad leader Squall, with behavior suggesting romantic attachment. Her tactical approach contrasts with Phantom Task's typically measured operations, often prioritizing direct confrontation over subtlety.

=== Other characters ===
Tabane Shinonono (篠ノ之 束, Shinonono Tabane)
Voiced by: Yukari Tamura (Japanese); Allison Keith (English)
Tabane Shinonono is the brilliant but elusive creator of IS technology and Houki's estranged older sister. As the world's most wanted individual due to her knowledge, she maintains close ties only with Chifuyu Orimura and the younger generation—Ichika and Houki—while displaying open disdain for others. Her cheerful demeanor masks formidable combat skills, demonstrated when she effortlessly countered three Phantom Task operatives. Though responsible for Ichika's initial IS compatibility through system modifications, she claims no knowledge of Byakushiki's unique movements. The rabbit motifs in her appearance reflect an eccentric personality that belies her dangerous reputation. Her past actions regarding IS development continue to affect both Houki and Ichika's lives.
Clarissa Harfouch (クラリッサ・ハルフォーフ, Kurarissa Harufōfu)
Voiced by: Kei Mizusawa (Japanese); Shannon Emerick (English)
Clarissa Harfouch serves as deputy commander of Schwarzer Hase, Germany's IS special forces, and pilots the Schwarzer Zweig (シュヴァルツェア・ツヴァイク). Like Laura Bodewig, she wears an eyepatch and shares an interest in Japanese media, though her anime-influenced understanding of the culture often proves unreliable when instructing Laura.
Natasha Fairs (ナターシャ・ファイルス, Natāsha Fairusu)
Natasha Fairs serves as the United States' IS Representative Cadet. She was the test pilot for the experimental Silver Gospel (銀の福音), which went berserk until stopped by Ichika Orimura and his allies. In gratitude, she kisses Ichika—a gesture that provokes jealousy among his peers.
Dan Gotanda (五反田 弾, Gotanda Dan)
Voiced by: Makoto Yasumura (Japanese); Christopher Ayres (English)
Dan Gotanda is Ichika Orimura's longtime friend from middle school and one of the few prominent male characters in the series. He frequently endures threats—and occasional physical discipline—from his aggressive younger sister Ran. His interactions provide rare male camaraderie in Ichika's predominantly female social circle.
Ran Gotanda (五反田 蘭, Gotanda Ran)
Voiced by: Noriko Obato (Japanese); Luci Christian (English)
Ran Gotanda is Dan's younger sister and a third-year middle school student council president. With an IS aptitude ranking of A, she plans to enroll at IS Academy while openly pursuing Ichika Orimura's affection. Her advances quickly mark her as a romantic rival to several female students, including Lingyin Huang.

== Media ==
=== Light novels ===
Infinite Stratos began as a light novel series written by Izuru Yumizuru, with illustrations provided by Okiura. The first volume was published by Media Factory under their MF Bunko J label on May 25, 2009. As of April 25, 2018, twelve volumes have been released.

Due to conflict between the publisher (Media Factory) and the author, publication of the light novels was under suspension. Later, the author confirmed that he is simultaneously writing a new work and continuing Infinite Stratos through Kodansha. The novels are now being published by Overlap under their Overlap Bunko imprint, with Choco replacing Okiura as illustrator. Reprints of the first seven volumes began on April 25, 2013, starting with the first two volumes. The series is set to end with its 13th volume.

The light novels are being translated into traditional Chinese and the first volume was published and released by Sharp Point Press on November 9, 2010. The Chinese translations of the light novels were originally under an indefinite suspension. Yumizuru cited that Media Factory's overseas representatives were engaging in contracts with foreign publishers without the author's permission as the reason for the suspension. Yumizuru had also stated that he was willing to fight over this matter in court if necessary.

On February 27, 2018, J-Novel Club announced it had licensed and begun translating the series into English.

==== Volumes ====
No.	Original release date	Original ISBN	English release date	English ISBN
1	May 25, 2009 (Media Factory); April 24, 2013 (Overlap)	978-4-8401-2788-2 (Media Factory); 978-4-9068-6605-2 (Overlap)	April 16, 2018	978-1-7183-2200-4
1. "My Classmates Are All Girls" (クラスメイトは全員女, Kurasumeito wa Zennin Onna); 2. "Class Representative Runoff" (クラス代表決定戦, Kurasu Daihyō Ketteisen); 3. "The Transfer Student is the Second Childhood Friend" (転校生はセカンド幼なじみ, Tenkōsei wa Sekando Osananajimi); 4. "Showdown! The Class League Match" (決戦!クラス対抗戦, Kessen! Kurasu Taikousen); 5. "Afterword" (あとがき, Atogaki)
2	August 25, 2009 (Media Factory); April 24, 2013 (Overlap)	978-4-8401-2870-4 (Media Factory); 978-4-9068-6606-9 (Overlap)	June 18, 2018	978-1-7183-2202-8
1. "Boy Meets Boy" (ボーイ・ミーツ・ボーイ, Bōi Mītsu Bōi); 2. "My Roommate is a Blond Gentleman" (ルームイトはブロンド貴公子(ジェントル), Rūmumeito wa Burondo Jentoru); 3. "Blue Days, Red Switch" (ブルー・デイズ・レッド・スイッチ, Burū Deizu Reddo Suicchi); 4. "Find Out My Mind" (ファインド・アウト・マイ・マインド, Faindo Auto Mai Maindo); 5. "Epilogue: From the Crimson's Deep Sleep" (エピローグ: 深なる紅(あか)のまどろみより, Epirōgu: Fukanaru Aka no Madoromi yori); 6. "Afterword" (あとがき, Atogaki)
3	December 25, 2009 (Media Factory); May 23, 2013 (Overlap)	978-4-8401-3086-8 (Media Factory); 978-4-9068-6607-6 (Overlap)	August 20, 2018	978-1-7183-2204-2
1. "Rain Maker" (乙女の心は晴れのち曇り(レイン・メーカー), Rein Mēkā); 2. "Ocean's Eleven!" (海に着いたら十一時!(オーシャンズ・イレブン), Ōshanzu Irebun!); 3. "Thin Red Line" (その境界線の上に立ち(シン・レッド・ライン), Shin Reddo Rain); 4. "Dressy White" (雪羅(ドレッシィ・ホワイト), Doresshī Howaito); 5. "Epilogue: Your Name is" (エピローグ: 君の名は(ユア・ネイム・イズ), Epirōgu: Yua Neimu Izu); 6. "Afterword" (あとがき, Atogaki)
4	March 25, 2010 (Media Factory); June 22, 2013 (Overlap)	978-4-8401-3179-7 (Media Factory); 978-4-9068-6608-3 (Overlap)	October 26, 2018	978-1-7183-2206-6
1. "Welcome in the Summer" (ウェルカム・イン・ザ・ザマー, Werukamu in za Samā); 2. "Rhapsody of Two Kittens" (二匹の子猫のラプソディー, Nihiki no Koneko no Rapusodī); 3. "Midsummer Night's Dream" (真夏の夜の夢, Manatsu no Yoru no Yume); 4. "Lovesick Quintet" (恋に騒がす五重奏(クインテット), Koi ni Sawagasu Kuintetto); 5. "Epilogue: Night Hunters in the Darkness" (エピローグ: 暗がりに潜みし闇苅, Epirōgu: Kuragari ni Hisomishi Kuragari); 6. "Afterword" (あとがき, Atogaki)
5	June 25, 2010 (Media Factory); July 25, 2013 (Overlap)	978-4-8401-3428-6 (Media Factory); 978-4-9068-6609-0 (Overlap)	December 24, 2018	978-1-7183-2208-0
1. "Heart Painkiller" (恋スル☆舌下錠(ハート・ペインキラー), Hāto Peinkirā); 2. "The Student Council President is a Felis Woman" (生徒会長は猫座の女, Seitokaichō wa Nekoza no Onna); 3. "Clear Melody of Cinderella's Heel" (硝子少女(シンデレラ・ヒール)の透色和音, Shinderera Hīru no Sukiiro Waon); 4. "Mysterious Lady" (ミステリアス・レイディ, Misuteriasu Reidi); 5. "Epilogue: Beginning of the Story" (エピローグ: ｢ものがたり｣のはじまり, Epirōgu: Monogatari no Hajimari); 6. "Afterword" (あとがき, Atogaki)
6	December 24, 2010 (Media Factory); August 25, 2013 (Overlap)	978-4-8401-3516-0 (Media Factory); 978-4-9068-6610-6 (Overlap)	February 24, 2019	978-1-7183-2210-3
1. "Silent Ones" (静かなるもの, Shizukanaru Mono); 2. "Resound, Maiden's Victory Song" (鳴り響け、乙女の凱歌, Narihibike, Otome no Gaika); 3. "Cannonball Fast" (弾丸のように、速く(キャノンボール・ファスト), Kyanonbōru Fasuto); 4. "Heartbreaker" (ハートブレイカー, Hātobureikā); 5. "Epilogue: Reflection on the Water's Surface" (エピローグ: 水面映し, Epirōgu: Minamo Utsushi); 6. "Afterword" (あとがき, Atogaki)
7	April 8, 2011 (Media Factory); September 25, 2013 (Overlap)	978-4-8401-3856-7 (Media Factory); 978-4-9068-6611-3 (Overlap)	April 30, 2019	978-1-7183-2212-7
1. "Sisters" (シスターズ, Shisutāzu); 2. "Girls' Beat" (ガールズ・ビート, Gāruzu Bīto); 3. "Open Your Heart!" (オープン・ユア・ハート, Ōpun Yua Hāto); 4. "The Condition for a Hero" (ヒーローの条件, Hīrō no Jōken); 5. "Epilogue: The Beautiful Night Under the Moon" (エピローグ: 月のきれいな夜に, Epirōgu: Tsuki no Kirei na Yoru ni); 6. "Afterword" (あとがき, Atogaki)
8	April 25, 2013	978-4-9068-6604-5	July 1, 2019	978-1-7183-2214-1
1. "But Weirdness Happens Daily – Strange Days Again" (けれど奇妙な日々は、また(ストレンジ・デイズ・アゲイン), Sutorenji Deizu Agein); 2. "The Name of the Strongest Champion in the World – Brunhilde" (世界最強を冠する名(ブリュンヒルデ), Sekai Saikyō o Kansuru na (Buryunhirude)); 3. "The Separation and Dismantling of the Worlds – World Purge" (世界の分離と解体(ワールド・パージ), Sekai no Bunri to Kaitai (Wārudo Pāji)); 4. "The Tea Party at the Secret Garden" (お茶会は秘密の花園で, Ochakai wa Himitsu no Hanazono de); 5. "Epilogue: The Knight who rests amidst the Forest of Sakuras" (桜の森の眠れる騎士, Epirōgu: Sakura no Mori no Nemureru Kishi); 6. "Afterword" (あとがき, Atogaki)
9	April 24, 2014	978-4-9068-6636-6	August 31, 2019	978-1-7183-2216-5
1. "Knockin' On You & You" (心が恋に落ちる者(ノッキン・オン・ユー&ユー), Nokkin on Yū & Yū (Kokoro ga Koi ni Ochiru-mono)); 2. "Hamster Cluster!" (恋のライバル注意報(ハムスター・クラスター), Hamustā Kurasutā (Koi no Raibaru Chūihō); 3. "Fighting Now" (駆けろ、秋の大運動会！(ファイティング・ナウ), Faitingu Nau (Kakero, Aki no Dai Undō-kai!)); 4. "Bubble Daydream" (じゃぽんだま・デイドリーム, Japon-dama Deidorīmu); 5. "It's A Fantastic!" (乙女の秘密は最高機密(イッツ・ア・ファンタスティック), Ittsu A Fantasutikku (Otome no Himitsu wa Saik Kimitsu)); 6. "Epilogue: Like a Lover, Like a Virgin!" (恋するように乞い、愛するように逢い(ライク・ア・ラブ・ライク・ア・ヴァージン), Raiku A Rabu Raiku A Vājin (Koi-suru you ni Koi, Ai-suru you ni Ai)); 7. "Afterword" (あとがき, Atogaki)
10	July 23, 2015	978-4-8655-4046-8	November 10, 2019	978-1-7183-2218-9
11	May 24, 2017	978-4-86554-213-4	January 13, 2020	978-1-7183-2220-2
12	April 25, 2018	978-4-86554-336-0	April 4, 2020	978-1-7183-2222-6
1. "Unawakened Passion" (醒めやらぬ熱情, Mezame-yaranu Netsujō); 2. "Seventh Princess, Storms forth" (第七王女(セブンス・プリンセス)、襲来, Sebunsu Purinsesu (Dai-nana Ōjo), Shūrai); 3. "Beautiful Duelists" (美しき決闘者たち(ビューティフル・デュエリスト), Byūtifuru Dyuerisuto); 4. "Red, Burning, Reigekka" (赤く、烟る、雪月花, Akaku, Moeru, Reigekka); 5. "Retuning Daily Life and, Ending World" (日常回帰と、終わる世界, Nichijō Kaiki to, Owaru Sekai); 6. "Afterword" (あとがき, Atogaki)

=== Manga ===
A manga adaptation by Kenji Akahoshi began serialization in the manga magazine Monthly Comic Alive on May 27, 2010, its July 2010 issue, and ended in the September 2012 issue on July 27, 2012. The first bound volume was released on December 22, 2010, and released five volumes until September 21, 2012, under their Alive Comics imprint.

Homura Yūki launched a second manga adaptation in Shogakukan's seinen manga magazine Monthly Sunday Gene-X on May 18, 2013. The manga went on hiatus starting on June 19, 2018, and returned in 2019. The manga finished on February 19, 2020. Shogakukan collected its chapters in eight tankōbon volumes, released from November 19, 2013, to March 19, 2020.

=== Internet radio ===
An Internet radio show named Radio IS, produced by Super A&G+, aired from January 1 to March 26, 2011. The show was hosted by Yōko Hikasa, the voice actor of Houki Shinonono, and Asami Shimoda, the voice actor of Lingyin Huang. The first episode was available in the listening archives for three weeks, whereas subsequent episodes were available for two weeks. A second radio show, called Radio IS Overtime (Radio IS 延長戦, Rajio IS Enchōsen) began airing on April 9, 2011, and aired four biweekly episodes until May 21, 2011.

=== Anime ===
An anime television series adaptation for Infinite Stratos was first announced on June 21, 2010, and its official website opening on August 8, 2010. The adaptation is directed by Yasuhito Kikuchi who also directed Macross Frontier with Eight Bit, who also handled Macross Frontier, animating the adaptation. The character designer and chief animation director of the anime is Takeyasu Kurashima and the mecha designer is Takeshi Takakura. The script was handled by Atsuhiro Tomioka, Chinatsu Hōjō, and Fumihiko Shimo. Shimo will also be handling the series' composition. The anime aired in Japan between January 7 to April 1, 2011, on TBS, with subsequent runs on CBC, SUN-TV, KBS, and BS-TBS. Six DVD and Blu-ray volumes were released by Media Factory between March 30 and September 21, 2011. An original video animation (OVA) episode, entitled IS <Infinite Stratos> Encore: A Sextet Yearns to Be in Love (IS＜インフィニット・ストラトス＞アンコール 『恋に焦がれる六重奏』, IS <Infinitto Sutoratosu> Ankōru: Koi ni Kogareru Rokujūsō), was released in Japan on DVD and Blu-ray on December 7, 2011. A second season of the anime series was announced in April 2013.

The anime is licensed in North America by Sentai Filmworks, with simulcasts provided by Anime Network on its video website. Section23 Films released the series and the OVA with an English dub (produced by Seraphim Digital) on DVD and Blu-ray on April 10, 2012.

The first season of the anime is licensed in the United Kingdom by MVM Films for release on February 17, 2014, on DVD.

The second season of the anime aired from October 4 to December 20, 2013. Sentai Filmworks has also acquired the second season for streaming and home video release in 2014.

The anime's soundtrack is composed by Hikaru Nanase. The opening theme song for the anime is "Straight Jet", performed by Minami Kuribayashi. The ending theme song is "Super∞Stream", with the first episode version sung by Yōko Hikasa, the second and third episode version sung by Hikasa and Yukana, the fourth and fifth episode version sung by Hikasa, Yukana and Asami Shimoda, the sixth and seventh episode version sung by Hikasa, Yukana, Shimoda and Kana Hanazawa and the final version for the rest of episodes sung by Hikasa, Yukana, Shimoda, Hanazawa and Marina Inoue. Each version of the song reflects the voice actresses' character who is running with Ichika in the episodes' ending credits. The CD single for "Straight Jet" was released on January 26, 2011, and the CD single for "Super∞Stream" was released on February 16, 2011. Both singles are published under the Lantis label. For the OVA, the ending theme is "Best Partner" (ベストパートナー, Besuto Pātonā) by Yōko Hikasa. For the second season, the opening theme is "True Blue Traveler" by Minami Kuribayashi and the ending theme is "Beautiful Sky" by Yōko Hikasa.

=== Games ===
A 2014 video game, titled Infinite Stratos 2: Ignition Hearts for the PlayStation 3 and PlayStation Vita, was released in Japan on February 27, 2014. Its plot focuses on memories from Ichika's school festival, and is developed by 5pb. A TCG game from Bushiroad's Five gross was released on November 8, 2013. Characters from Infinite Stratos also feature in the PlayStation Vita game Kaku-San-Sei Million Arthur.

A PC mecha action game developed by 5pb. titled Infinite Stratos: Versus Colors was released in Japan on December 31, 2014. Another video game titled Infinite Stratos 2: Love and Purge for the PlayStation 3 and PlayStation Vita was released in Japan on September 3, 2015. A cross-platform Gacha game titled "Infinite Stratos: Archetype Breaker" (インフィニット・ストラトス アーキタイプ・ブレイカー, Infinitto Sutoratosu: Ākitaipu Bureikā) was released by DMM Games in December 2017, and was shut down on August 27, 2018.

== Reception and sales ==
The light novels have collectively sold 1.2 million copies by February 2011.

The opening theme of the anime adaptation, "Straight Jet", reached No. 16, and the ending theme, "Super∞Stream", reached No. 10 on the Oricon charts. The Blu-ray release of its first volume sold around 22,000 copies in its first week, becoming only the sixth-ever first volume of any anime television series to reach number 1 on Oricon's Blu-ray Disc weekly overall sales chart.

Theron Martin of Anime News Network criticized the anime for its "unbelievably dense protagonist" and weak storyline, but the action sequences received praise.
