= Kloss =

== Surname ==
Kloss is a German surname. Some individuals with the surname include:

- Cecil Boden Kloss (1877–1949), English zoologist
- Dorothy Kloss (1923–2026), Americal dancer
- Eric Kloss (born 1949), American jazz saxophonist
- Georg Kloss, (1787–1854), German historian and early researcher in the history of freemasonry
- Hans Kloss (artist) (1938–2018), German painter and graphic artist
- Hans Kloss (bank manager) (1905–1986), Austrian bank manager and lawyer
- Hans Kloss, a fictional World War II secret agent from the television series Stawka większa niż życie
- Heinz Kloss (1904–1987), German sociolinguist
- Henry Kloss (1929–2002), American audio engineer and entrepreneur
- Ilana Kloss (born 1956), South African tennis player
- John Kloss (1937–1987), American fashion designer
- Karlie Kloss (born 1992), American fashion model

== Businesses ==
- Rieger–Kloss, pipe organ manufacturing company

== See also ==
- Kloß (disambiguation)
