= Hatsune Miku: Project Diva =

Series of video games

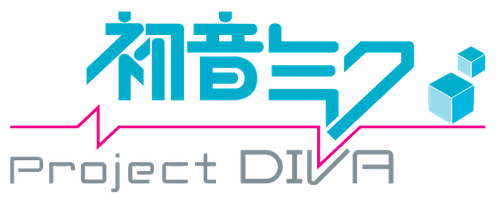
- Logo
- Genre: Rhythm game
- Developers: Sega; Crypton Future Media
- Publishers: Sega; Dwango Music Entertainment
- Platforms: PlayStation Portable, PlayStation 3, PlayStation 4, PlayStation Vita, Nintendo 3DS, Sega RingEdge, Sega Nu, iOS, Nintendo Switch, Android, Microsoft Windows
- First release: Hatsune Miku: Project Diva; July 2, 2009
- Latest release: Hatsune Miku: Project Diva Mega Mix+ May 26, 2022

Hatsune Miku: Project Diva (初音ミク -Project DIVA-; stylized as Hatsune Miku: Project DIVA) is a series of rhythm games created by Sega and Crypton Future Media. The series currently consists of 6 main titles, released on various PlayStation consoles, the Nintendo Switch, Microsoft Windows, and in arcades, the 2 Project Mirai games for the Nintendo 3DS, and 4 spin-offs for mobile and VR platforms. The series primarily makes use of Vocaloids, a series of singing synthesizer software developed by the Yamaha Corporation, and the songs created using these Vocaloids, most notably the virtual-diva Vocaloid Hatsune Miku.

== Gameplay ==
Demonstration of the typical gameplay style and interface of games within the Hatsune Miku: Project Diva series. Note the circle, square, X and triangle symbols, as well as the judgment ratings that follow the player's inputs. The song shown is "Luka Luka ☆ Night Fever" by samfree featuring Megurine Luka from Hatsune Miku: Project Diva Mega Mix+, played on Hard difficulty.

Project Diva titles are rhythm games in which players are allowed to choose from a wide variety of Vocaloid songs, original songs sung by Vocaloids, including songs sung by Hatsune Miku, Kagamine Rin and Len, Megurine Luka, Kaito, and Meiko. Players also can choose which character they wish to play in the game. Known as modules, these modules can be completely different characters or simply different costumes for the same characters. These modules, though not directly controlled by the player, will be the ones appearing in the music videos throughout the game including their specific costumes. For example, if the player chooses Kagamine Rin for their first character and Hatsune Miku for their second character, only Kagamine Rin appears in the video during solo songs, but for duets both Hatsune Miku and Kagamine Rin will appear. Each of the songs has their own difficulties, ranging from Easy, Normal, Hard, Extreme and Extra Extreme for some songs in newer games. Initially both the Easy and Normal difficulties of a song are unlocked, upon clearing the Normal difficulty, the Hard difficulty will be unlocked and so forth. Players progress through the game by completing songs and unlocking more new songs until they eventually unlock all songs.

Gameplay is similar to that of other rhythm games, in which players must press a series of buttons according to the sequence on the screen. The game primarily makes use of the 4 main symbols, cross, circle, square and triangle, which are the face buttons for the PlayStation controllers. Various floating gray buttons of those symbols will appear on the screen, and the colored version of those symbols will begin to float in from the various sides of the screen. The player is required to press the face button once the colored symbol lands on its monochrome version and based on the player's timing their accuracy is rated. Accuracy is described with a word displayed in the bottom right corner of the screen, ranging from "Cool" to "Miss". The game is scored on accuracy and the player is awarded with a rank ranging from "Perfect" to "Dropout" (denoted by Drop×Out). It also includes a chance mode whereby the combo system compounds points earned, for example one perfect note gives the player 100 points, if they have a combo of 34 notes, the 34th note alone gives them an additional 3400 points.

In addition to the game's standard rhythm game feature, each game leading up to Hatsune Miku: Project Diva F 2nd had a Edit Mode, which allowed users to create their own custom Promotional Video (PV) or Music Video, using songs already in the game or any custom MP3 format music file for the PV. Players can customize the video playing in the background, the various modules, backgrounds, costumes and even dance moves by the modules in the PV. Players can also modify the module's face to make the module appear to be singing so as to lip-sync the custom song to the video. Other than the Edit Mode, there is also a Diva's Room mode in which players can buy and obtain items throughout the game or from the in-game store to decorate their module's room with. Players can also take screenshots of their modules whilst they are playing in their room. There were also multiple official contests hosted by Sega for user-generated PV's to be added to the official lineup of Hatsune Miku: Project Diva Arcade songs.

== Games ==
Release timeline
2009	Hatsune Miku: Project Diva
2010	Hatsune Miku: Project Diva Arcade
2010	Hatsune Miku: Project Diva 2nd
2011	Hatsune Miku: Project Diva Extend
2012	Hatsune Miku and Future Stars: Project Mirai
2012	Miku Flick
2012	Miku Flick/02
2012	Hatsune Miku: Project Diva f (Vita)
2013	Hatsune Miku: Project Diva F (PS3)
2013	Hatsune Miku: Project Mirai 2
2013	Hatsune Miku: Project Diva Arcade Future Tone
2014	Hatsune Miku: Project Diva F 2nd
2015	Hatsune Miku: Project Mirai DX
2016	Hatsune Miku: Project Diva X
2016	Hatsune Miku: Project Diva Future Tone
2016	Hatsune Miku: VR Future Live
2017	Hatsune Miku: Project Diva Future Tone DX
2018
2019
2020	Hatsune Miku: Project Diva Mega Mix/Mega39s
2020	Hatsune Miku: Colorful Stage!
2021
2022	Hatsune Miku: Project Diva Mega Mix+/Mega39s+

=== Project Diva ===
==== Hatsune Miku: Project Diva ====
Hatsune Miku: Project Diva is the first game in the Project Diva series, first released on July 2, 2009 for the PlayStation Portable handheld. The game was later playable on the PlayStation 3 using software known as Dreamy Theater, which allowed connectivity between the PSP and the PS3.

==== Hatsune Miku: Project Diva Arcade ====
Hatsune Miku: Project Diva Arcade is an arcade game in the Project Diva series, and featured many new exclusive features. An updated port of the original Project Diva game, the Arcade version featured many new songs from the unreleased Project Diva 2nd, along with updated high definition visuals akin to the Dreamy Theater version of the first game. A sequel titled Project Diva Arcade Future Tone was announced on May 22, 2013, and later released on November 21, 2013. The game was ported to the PlayStation 4 in 2016 (2017 in America) under the name Hatsune Miku: Project Diva Future Tone.

==== Hatsune Miku: Project Diva 2nd ====
Hatsune Miku: Project Diva 2nd is the sequel to Project Diva and was released on July 29, 2010 for the PlayStation Portable handheld, almost exactly one year after the first game. The game introduced new features including a new difficulty, duet songs and Diva Room, while main gameplay largely remained unchanged. Similar to the first game, Dreamy Theater 2nd was also released, allowing players to play the game on the PlayStation 3 with high definition visuals. This second installment of Dreamy Theater introduced stereoscopic 3D for the first time in the series.

==== Hatsune Miku: Project Diva Extend ====
Hatsune Miku: Project Diva Extend is an expansion to Project Diva 2nd for the PlayStation Portable with the interface, graphics and gameplay being virtually the same as Project Diva 2nd. It was released on November 10, 2011 and featured a wide variety of new models and new songs. The game allowed players to import data from Project DIVA 2nd into the game, including saves, songs, costumes and downloadable content. Similar to past games in the series, a companion game Hatsune Miku: Project Diva Dreamy Theater Extend was released on the PlayStation 3 on September 13, 2012 with improved visuals and support for stereoscopic 3D.

==== Hatsune Miku: Project Diva F ====
Hatsune Miku: Project Diva F is the next main entry in the Project Diva series that makes its debut on the PlayStation Vita and on the PlayStation 3 as a full-fledged game rather than downloadable software like Dreamy Theater. It was released on August 30, 2012 for the PlayStation Vita and on March 7, 2013 for the PlayStation 3. Though both are essentially the same game, the PS3 version includes additional songs and costumes. The songs were later released as downloadable content for the PlayStation Vita. The PlayStation Vita version also has additional gameplay features such as "scratch" that make use of its touch-screen and touch-panel features and AR features using the front and back camera. On March 7, 2013, Sega posted an image of Project Diva F on their Facebook page, asking fans to like and share if they want to see the game released in Western territories. The game was released in the United States on 27 August and 3 September in Europe.

==== Hatsune Miku: Project Diva F 2nd ====
Hatsune Miku: Project Diva F 2nd is the direct sequel to Project Diva F, and was also available on PlayStation Vita and PlayStation 3. It was released on March 27, 2014.

==== Hatsune Miku: Project Diva X ====
Hatsune Miku: Project DIVA X was announced on the eighth anniversary of Hatsune Miku (August 31, 2015). It was released in Japan on March 24, 2016 for the PlayStation Vita and on August 25, 2016 for the PlayStation 4. Project Diva X was released in Europe and North America on August 30, 2016.

==== Hatsune Miku: Project Diva Future Tone ====
Hatsune Miku: Project Diva Future Tone is a PlayStation 4 port of the arcade game of the same name, first released on the PlayStation Store in Japan on June 23, 2016. It consists of two main content packs, "Future Sound" (focusing on songs that debuted on PlayStation platforms) and "Colorful Tone" (focusing on songs that debuted on non-PlayStation platforms). A demo version of the game, branded as "Prelude", is available for free on PlayStation Store, containing two songs. It can be upgraded into the full game by purchasing at least one of the two aforementioned packs as downloadable content. Five "Encore" DLC packs, consisting of additional songs and other content, were released on June 9, 2016, January 6, 2017, March 9, 2017, July 2, 2020 and October 15, 2020, respectively. Users also have the option of purchasing an Item Unlock Key from the PlayStation store, which gives the player access to all module customization options and maxes out their VP. The game was released in Europe and North America on January 10, 2017. A physical version, Future Tone DX, was released in Japan on November 22, 2017; it contains both core content packs and all existing DLC, two additional songs and modules, and a photo mode within the music video mode. It was also released in a limited edition bundle, adding a three-disc Blu-ray compilation of 200 music videos from the series.

==== Hatsune Miku: Project Diva Mega Mix/Mega39s ====
On July 1, 2019, in honor of the franchise's 10th anniversary, Sega announced Hatsune Miku: Project Diva Mega39's for the Nintendo Switch. The game includes 101 songs, including 10 new songs (which were later released as a DLC port to the Future Tone game), a more anime-like art style featuring cel shaded graphics, and new gameplay modes that utilize the Joy-Con controllers. At Magical Mirai 2019, Sega announced that the game would be released in Japan on February 13, 2020, and in Western regions on May 15, 2020. Western versions are retitled Mega Mix; the Japanese and Asian title is a pun based on the Japanese pronunciation of "39's", which sounds similar to "Miku's" and "Mix". Additionally, a limited edition bundle with a five-disc soundtrack and art book among other items was made available alongside the game's Japanese release.

On May 26, 2022 it was released on Microsoft Windows via Steam as Hatsune Miku: Project Diva Mega Mix+/Mega 39s+. This enhanced version features additional songs, as well as the ability to switch the graphic style to the one used in Project Diva Future Tone. An Item Unlock Key is also available for purchase on Steam.

=== Project Mirai series ===
==== Hatsune Miku and Future Stars: Project Mirai ====
Hatsune Miku and Future Stars: Project Mirai is a spin-off from the series, with different gameplay from the main series and an art style based on Nendoroid figures. It is the first game in the series to be released on the Nintendo 3DS. The game was released on March 8, 2012, and it added several new features to the series including Augmented Reality features using AR cards to show 3D models on the 3DS Cameras, as well as the option to change voice and lyrics in a song to match the selected Vocaloid.

==== Hatsune Miku: Project Mirai 2 ====
Hatsune Miku: Project Mirai 2 is a direct sequel to Hatsune Miku and Future Stars: Project Mirai and the second game to be released for the Nintendo 3DS. It was released on November 28, 2013. The game makes use of the touch screen, circle pad, and directional pad. It also makes use of Internet Co., Ltd. Vocaloid, Gumi and has a mini-game based on the Puyo Puyo series.

==== Hatsune Miku: Project Mirai DX ====
Hatsune Miku: Project Mirai DX is an upgraded version of Hatsune Miku: Project Mirai 2 that added one new song, new videos, a new chart, and a new higher difficulty option. It was the first Project Mirai game on the Nintendo 3DS to be released outside of Japan. The game was released on May 28, 2015 in Japan, September 8, 2015 in North America, and on September 11, 2015 in Europe.

== Characters ==
Characters of the series (in standard module). From left to right: Kaito, Meiko, Kagamine Len, Hatsune Miku, Kagamine Rin, and Megurine Luka (Project Diva F graphics).

The current list of characters who have appeared in the series are:

Character	Game														
Character	Project Diva	Project Diva Arcade	Project Diva 2nd	Project Diva Extend	Project Mirai	Miku Flick	Miku Flick/02	Project Diva F	Project Mirai 2	Project Diva Arcade Future Tone	Project Diva F 2nd	Project Diva X	Project Diva Future Tone	Project Diva Mega Mix	Colorful Stage
Hatsune Miku	Playable	Playable	Playable	Playable	Playable	Playable	Playable	Playable	Playable	Playable	Playable	Playable	Playable	Playable	Playable
Kagamine Rin	Playable	Playable	Playable	Playable	Playable		Playable	Playable	Playable	Playable	Playable	Playable	Playable	Playable	Playable
Kagamine Len	Playable	Playable	Playable	Playable	Playable		Playable	Playable	Playable	Playable	Playable	Playable	Playable	Playable	Playable
Megurine Luka	Playable	Playable	Playable	Playable	Playable		Playable	Playable	Playable	Playable	Playable	Playable	Playable	Playable	Playable
Kaito	Playable	Playable	Playable	Playable	Playable		DLC	Playable	Playable	Playable	Playable	Playable	Playable	Playable	Playable
Meiko	Playable	Playable	Playable	Playable	Playable		DLC	Playable	Playable	Playable	Playable	Playable	Playable	Playable	Playable
Sakine Meiko	Playable	Playable	Playable	Playable				Unlockable		Playable	Unlockable	DLC	Playable	Playable	
Akita Neru	Playable	Playable	Playable	Playable				DLC		Playable	DLC	DLC	Playable	Playable	
Yowane Haku	Playable	Playable	Playable	Playable				DLC		Playable	DLC	DLC	Playable	Playable	
Kasane Teto			DLC	DLC				DLC		Playable	DLC	DLC	Playable	Playable	Music only
Mikudayo											DLC	DLC			Music only
Gumi					Playable				Playable						Music only

== Sales ==
The series has been popular among fans in Japan, having sold over 1 million copies as of April 2012 in Japan alone. In July 2014, Sega announced that the franchise has sold a total of 2.5 million games within Japan. By November 2014, the franchise had sold 4.5 million units at retail and downloads. By March 2017, the series had sold 5.3 million units. As of 2018, the series has sold 6 million units.
