= Hatsune Miku: Project Mirai 2 =

Video game for the Nintendo 3DS

- Japanese cover art
- Developer: Sega
- Publisher: Sega
- Series: Hatsune Miku: Project DIVA
- Platform: Nintendo 3DS
- Release: JP: November 28, 2013
- Genre: Rhythm
- Mode: Single-player

Hatsune Miku: Project Mirai Deluxe/DX
- European cover art
- Developer: Sega
- Publishers: WW: Sega; KR: Nintendo
- Director: Motoshi Takabe
- Producer: Makoto Osaki
- Designers: Motoshi Takabe; Hiroyuki Abe; Yukihito Yagi; Takeshi Hiyori
- Programmers: Fuminori Sato; Hiroshi Michikami; Yusuke Nakanishi
- Artist: Kazuya Morita
- Series: Hatsune Miku: Project DIVA
- Platform: Nintendo 3DS
- Release: JP/KR: May 28, 2015; NA: September 8, 2015; PAL: September 11, 2015
- Genre: Rhythm
- Mode: Single-player

Hatsune Miku: Project Mirai 2 (初音ミク Project Mirai 2) is a rhythm game created by Sega and Crypton Future Media for the Nintendo 3DS. It is the sequel to Hatsune Miku and Future Stars: Project Mirai. The game is also a spin-off of the Hatsune Miku: Project DIVA series of Vocaloid rhythm games and was first released only in Japan on November 28, 2013. Like the original, the game primarily makes use of Vocaloids, a series of singing synthesizer software and the songs created using these vocaloids most notably the virtual-diva Vocaloid Hatsune Miku. It is also the second game to include a Vocaloid made by Internet Co., Ltd., Gumi. An updated version of the game was released in 2015, first in Japan as Hatsune Miku: Project Mirai Deluxe (初音ミク Project Mirai でらっくす), then in North America and Europe under the title of Hatsune Miku: Project Mirai DX.

== Gameplay ==
While Project Mirai only had button controls, Project Mirai 2 adds use of touch screen controls where players tap the bottom screen. An increased sense of speed and additional gimmicks have also been added. In addition to hitting the markers on the touch screen with the right timing that goes with the song, the more difficult settings will increase it up to three different marker colors. The thicker lines seen on the trail will require players to hold down the touch screen part, and when it is rainbow-colored, players will be incentivized to spin it around in circles.

The old style of play used in the first Project Mirai is still available, for those that prefer that, with a few new twists added. In addition to the A, B, X, and Y buttons, players also need to use the directional D pad for certain keys. Similar to the Touch Mode gameplay part, players will be required to hold down the buttons for the thicker lines. The rainbow colored parts can be done by rotating the Circle Pad in circles. There are also 2 Line parts that require both uses of the A, B, X, and Y buttons along with directional buttons, at the same time. The game also features a mini-game based on the Puyo Puyo series, known as "Puyo Puyo 39". The "My Room" and "Augmented Reality" feature also return in this game. The English and Korean versions featured Japanese Romaji lyric subtitles, whereas the Japanese version featured Japanese Kanji lyric subtitles.

== Hatsune Miku: Project Mirai Deluxe/DX ==
An updated version of Project Mirai 2 intended for worldwide release, Project Mirai Deluxe/DX makes the following changes:

- All videos were removed, and replaced with newly created real-time animations
- One new song was added
- Some charts were slightly modified
- Six songs were given exclusive new higher-difficulty charts
- A new mini-game based on Reversi.

== Reception ==
Reception

Aggregate score
Aggregator	Score
Metacritic	80/100

Review scores
Publication	Score
Destructoid	6.5/10
GameRevolution	9/10
Hardcore Gamer	4/5
Nintendo Life	9/10
Nintendo World Report	6.5/10

Hatsune Miku: Project Mirai DX received "generally favorable reviews" according to review aggregator Metacritic.

Morgan Sleeper of Nintendo Life called the game "one of the 3DS' greatest hits," stating, "Its rhythm game core is inspired and addictive, the presentation is charming and fun, and there's no shortage of activities to keep you happily busy between songs, with dress-up, interior decorating, choreography, and a full-on Puyo Puyo mode all providing enjoyable distractions from the dancefloor." GameRevolution gave the game a nine out of ten, praising the game for its controls, amount of songs, creation tools, and videos, while criticizing the distracting background videos. Kyle Burleson of Destructoid called the entry his "least favorite outing of hers in the realm of games," criticizing its lack of difficulty but praising the amount of content.

== Song list ==
There are 48 songs (79 if different singers is counted).

17 (27) songs are brand new while 31 (52) songs are from previous games.

Song List
Song name	Performed by	Producer
Finder (DSLR remix - re:edit) (ファインダー (DSLR remix - re:edit), Faindaa (DSLR remix- re:edit))	Hatsune Miku	kz
Sweet Magic (スイートマジック, Suiito Majikku)	Kagamine Rin	Junky
Deep Sea Girl (深海少女, Shinkai Shoujo)	Hatsune Miku	Yuuyu-P
Animal Fortune-telling (どうぶつ占い, Doubutsu Uranai)	Hatsune Miku or Kagamine Rin or Megurine Luka or MEIKO	Scop
Terekakushi Shishunki (テレカクシ思春期)	Kagamine Len or KAITO	HoneyWorks
The World is Mine (ワールドイズマイン, Waarudo Izu Main)	Hatsune Miku	ryo
Amatsu Kitsune (アマツキツネ)	Kagamine Rin	marasy
Ageage Again (アゲアゲアゲイン, Ageage Agein)	Hatsune Miku	Mitchie M
Clover♣Club (クローバー♣クラブ, Kuroobaa♣Kurabu)	Hatsune Miku	Yuuyu-P
Yumeyume (ゆめゆめ, Yumeyume)	Hatsune Miku	DECO*27
Doremifa Rondo (ドレミファロンド)	Hatsune Miku	40meterP
reverse rainbow (逆さまレインボー, Sakasama Reinboo)	Kagamine Rin; Hatsune Miku or Kagamine Rin; Kagamine Len or Megurine Luka; Hatsune Miku	Sunzriver-P
KONEKO NO PAYAPAYA (子猫のパヤパヤ)	Hatsune Miku; MEIKO	Onecup-P
Hello/How are you? (ハロ/ハワユ, Haro/Hawayu)	Hatsune Miku	Hoehoe-P
Kokoro (ココロ)	Kagamine Rin	Travolta-P
PIANO*GIRL	Hatsune Miku	OSTER Project
Happy Synthesizer (ハッピーシンセサイザ, Happii Shinsesaiza)	Megurine Luka; Gumi	EasyPop
SING&SMILE	Hatsune Miku or Kagamine Rin or Kagamine Len or Megurine Luka or KAITO or MEIKO	Re:nG
1/6 -out of the gravity-	Hatsune Miku	Vocaliod-P
Mousou Sketch (妄想スケッチ, Mousou Suketchi)	Hatsune Miku or Kagamine Rin	40meterP; Signal-P (Rin ver.)
1925	Hatsune Miku or Kagamine Rin or Kagamine Len or Megurine Luka or KAITO or MEIKO	T-POCKET
Matryoshka (マトリョシカ, Matoryoshika)	Hatsune Miku; Gumi	Hachi
Cendrillon (サンドリヨン, Sandoriyon)	Hatsune Miku; KAITO	Signal-P
Adolescence (アドレサンス, Adoresansu)	Kagamine Rin; Kagamine Len	Signal-P
on the rocks	MEIKO; KAITO	OSTER Project
No Logic	Megurine Luka	JimmyThumb-P
Hello, Planet. (＊ハロー、プラネット。, ＊Haroo, Puranetto.)	Hatsune Miku	sasakure.UK
Romeo and Cinderella (ロミオとシンデレラ, Romio to Shinderera)	Hatsune Miku or Kagamine Rin or Megurine Luka	doriko
LOL -lots of laugh-	Hatsune Miku	Ken
Senbonzakura (千本桜)	Hatsune Miku	Kurousa-P
Aku no Musume (悪ノ娘)	Kagamine Rin	Akuno-P
Aku no Meshitsukai (悪ノ召使)	Kagamine Len	Akuno-P
Snowman (スノーマン, Sunooman)	KAITO or Kagamine Len	Halyosy
Invisible (インビジブル, Inbijiburu)	Gumi; Kagamine Rin	Kemu
Gaikotsu Gakudan to Lilia (骸骨楽団とリリア)	Hatsune Miku	Tohma
ARIFURETA SEKAI SEIFUKU (ありふれたせかいせいふく, Common World Domination)	Hatsune Miku	Pinocchio-P
Electric Love (エレクトリック・ラブ, Erekutorikku Rabu)	Hatsune Miku	Hachioji-P
Melancholic (メランコリック, Merankorikku)	Kagamine Rin	Junky
1 2 Fanclub (いーあるふぁんくらぶ, Ii Aru Fankurabu)	Gumi; Kagamine Rin	Mikito-P
Electric Angel (えれくとりっく・えんじぇぅ, Erekutorikku Enjeu)	Hatsune Miku or Kagamine Rin or Megurine Luka	Yasuo-P
Interviewer (インタビュアー, Intabyuaa)	Megurine Luka or Hatsune Miku	Kuwagata-P
Tricolore Airline (トリコロール・エア・ライン, Torikorooru Ea Rain)	Hatsune Miku or Kagamine Rin or Megurine Luka or MEIKO	Atsuzou-kun
Piano x Forte x Scandal (ピアノxフォルテxスキャンダル, Piano x Forute x Sukyandaru)	MEIKO or Hatsune Miku or Kagamine Rin or KAITO	OSTER Project
Kimi no Taion (君の体温)	Hatsune Miku	Kuwagata-P
glow	Hatsune Miku	keeno
Nice To Meet You, Mr. Earthling (はじめまして地球人さん, Hajimemashite Chikyuujin-san)	Hatsune Miku	Pinocchio-P
Watashi no jikan (私の時間)	Hatsune Miku or Kagamine Rin or Kagamine Len	Kuchibashi-P
shake it!	Hatsune Miku; Kagamine Rin; Kagamine Len	emon

- Songs with a gray background are returning songs from previous games.
- Songs with a yellow background are songs exclusive to Project Mirai DX.
