= Hatsune Miku: Project Diva Arcade =

2010 video game

Hatsune Miku: Project DIVA Arcade
- Developer: Sega AM2
- Publishers: Sega; Dwango Music Entertainment
- Series: Hatsune Miku: Project DIVA
- Platforms: Arcade; PlayStation 4 Nintendo Switch; Microsoft Windows
- Release: Arcade: JP: June 23, 2010; Future Tone; Arcade: JP: November 21, 2013; PlayStation 4: JP: June 23, 2016; WW: January 10, 2017; Future Tone DX: JP: November 22, 2017; Mega Mix (WW) / Mega39's (JP): JP: February 13, 2020; WW: May 15, 2020; Mega Mix+ (WW) / Mega39's+ (JP): WW: May 26, 2022
- Genre: Rhythm game
- Mode: Single-player
- Arcade system: Sega RingEdge, Sega Nu (Future Tone)

Hatsune Miku: Project DIVA Arcade (初音ミク Project DIVA Arcade) is a 2010 arcade rhythm game developed by Sega AM2 and published by Sega and Dwango Music Entertainment as well as character and voicebank licensing from Crypton Future Media for arcade machines with the Sega RingEdge arcade system. The game is a port of the 2009 video game, Hatsune Miku: Project DIVA, with updated visuals and was released on June 23, 2010 in Japan. Like the original, the game primarily makes use of Vocaloid, a singing synthesizer program, and the songs are created using voicebanks from the program, most notably, the most-famous and moe anthropomorphic virtual diva and mascot Hatsune Miku.

A sequel titled Hatsune Miku: Project DIVA Arcade Future Tone (初音ミク Project DIVA Arcade Future Tone) was released on November 21, 2013. Notable changes include upgraded graphics and physics, a Touch Slider panel for arrow-shaped notes and new songs, as well as running on the Sega Nu arcade board. The arcade game has been ported to the PlayStation 4 under the title Hatsune Miku: Project DIVA Future Tone (初音ミク Project DIVA Future Tone) The game has been released digitally in two separate packs, Future Sound and Colorful Tone, along with a free Prelude base game demo, on June 23, 2016 in Japan and January 10, 2017 in North America and Europe, with a definitive version with new songs and modules, along with all three starter packs, entitled Hatsune Miku: Project DIVA Future Tone DX (初音ミク Project DIVA Future Tone DX), was released physically and digitally in Japan on November 22, 2017., the Nintendo Switch as Hatsune Miku: Project DIVA Mega Mix, also known in Japan and Asia as Hatsune Miku: Project DIVA Mega39's (初音ミク Project DIVA Mega39's) and Microsoft Windows as Hatsune Miku: Project DIVA Mega Mix+, also known in Japan and Asia as Hatsune Miku: Project DIVA Mega39's+ (初音ミク Project DIVA Mega39's+).

== Gameplay ==
As the game is a port of the PlayStation Portable games, the gameplay is relatively the same as the original. The signature PlayStation shaped buttons, circle, cross, square and triangle are now the 4 large buttons on the machine's panel, and players push those buttons to play the games. Unlike the handheld versions of the game, players can hold a button or buttons for an unlimited time when the game indicates to hold a certain note. This will allow players to receive a bonus which continually increases the score until the player releases one of the held button or a "Max Hold Bonus" is granted. Another difference is that multiple buttons can be hit at the same time up to all four buttons. The arcade version features songs from both Hatsune Miku: Project DIVA series and Hatsune Miku and Future Stars: Project Mirai, along with a variety of original songs not included in either of the handheld versions. The Promotional Videos (PVs) for the game, which are the videos playing in the background during a song have been updated and re-rendered for the game bearing a similar resemblance to the Dreamy Theater versions of the PVs. Players have the ability to choose from a reel of songs and select their difficulty before playing a song, similar to a Dance Dance Revolution arcade game. The four difficulties are Easy, Normal, Hard, and Extreme, as seen in Project DIVA 2nd. The PlayStation 4 version added arrow icons, using the signature PlayStation shaped button colors, in which can be combined to the signature PlayStation button icons (labeled as "Arcade"). Furthermore, MegaMix / Mega39's featured a newly re-tooled toon shader effect to match the anime visuals, along with new letter icons with a different color set to fit the four letter buttons on the Nintendo Switch (red A, orange B, green Y and blue X), with the option to combine it with a new color set to the arrows, using the Switch button colors, Mix Mode, which allows the Joy-Con controllers, using the L/SL and R/SR buttons to the beat, and Touch Play, which uses the Nintendo Switch's touch screen instead of the controllers. In MegaMix+ / Mega39's+ allows the ability to switch between the two visual styles, as well as a new color set to letter button icons to match the signature Xbox letter buttons (red B, green A, blue X and yellow Y), in which can be combined with a new color set to the arrows, matching the signature Xbox button icons. Lyric subtitles in the English version, as well as the Western languages in MegaMix / Mega39's & MegaMix+ / Mega39's+ shows Japanese Romaji lyric subtitles, whereas the Japanese and Chinese versions, as well as the Asian languages in MegaMix / Mega39's & MegaMix+ / Mega39's+, shows Japanese Kanji lyric subtitles.

== IC card function and Diva.Net ==
This arcade game utilizes an IC card function. Players can select to obtain a Project DIVA Arcade access card from any machine. This card will open more functions for use in Project DIVA Arcade, many of those functions resembling features in the hand-held games. With an access card, players will be able to save and load arcade data, select module outfits for use in the game, select a player name, and more. Vocaloid Points (VP) can also be accumulated through successful plays. VP can be used for gaining features, like modules, or changing player's name. Access Card holders can also participate in trials, similar to the console versions of Dance Dance Revolution. In these three-tier trials, named "Clear Trial", "Great Clear Trial", and "Perfect Clear Trial" by difficulty, the player must bet a certain amount of VP. If the player pass a trial, the VP will be kept, and receive the amount the player bet. If the trial is lost, the amount of VP bet is deducted from the total. Clearing "Perfect Clear Trial" will also net a large sum of VP.

Also, during Access Card creation, the game will ask the player to create a user name and password. This will be registered on the Internet and allows an Access Card holder to gain access to the "Project DIVA Arcade Diva.Net". Here, an Access Card holder can edit data and perform many and more of the functions that a Project DIVA Arcade machine can do. However, an Access Card holder must first accumulate 10 non-consecutive plays on any Project DIVA Arcade machine with an Internet connection before they can use many of Diva.Net's functions. Once 10 plays are accumulated, the Access Card holder will gain 30-day access to all of Diva.Net's functions. Access to Diva.Net can only be performed this way, and one gains another 30 days of access every 10 plays. This "access" is known as a Diva.Net Right. Upon first play, a Card holder can automatically obtain a Diva.Net Right once. Losing one's Right does not affect the data, but the Card holder is unable to change it through Diva.Net until another Right is obtained.

== Development ==
Project DIVA Arcade began development on the Virtua Fighter 5 engine, with a Hatsune Miku model being created in the engine with Dural as a base and then with the attributes changed to look like Miku instead. At the Summer 2009 Miku Festival, a prototype of Project DIVA Arcade was made using the Virtua Fighter 5 engine running on the Sega Lindbergh arcade board. Subsequently, the game became a full-fledged project at Sega. Development branched off from Virtua Fighter 5 and was transferred to the newer RingEdge arcade boards that then debuted as a prototype at a Spring 2010 Miku Fan event. Most changes made were with regards to the game's graphics and animation effects such as particles and motion blur.

Sega announced that Hatsune Miku: Project DIVA would be coming to arcades on October 5, 2009 and along with it a plea to fans to submit their own music for the game's track list. This was done between October 15 and October 31 where fans would upload their video to the Project DIVA Nico Nico Channel. These songs needed to be original songs and not remixes or variations of existing songs that were between 2 and a half minutes to 3 and a half minutes. The winners would then have their songs chosen by the game's development staff and then used in the release of the game. In addition, the website Piapro even held an event/contest for artists to submit their own created Vocaloid songs as well as illustrations for the game. Tripshots designed the machine which will include four buttons which has the same gameplay as its predecessor on the PSP.

== Versions ==
=== Project DIVA Arcade ===
- Hatsune Miku: Project DIVA Arcade (2010)
- Hatsune Miku: Project DIVA Arcade Revision 1 (2010)
- Hatsune Miku: Project DIVA Arcade Revision 2 (2010)
- Hatsune Miku: Project DIVA Arcade Revision 3 (2010)
- Hatsune Miku: Project DIVA Arcade Version A (2011)
- Hatsune Miku: Project DIVA Arcade Version A Revision 1 (2011)
- Hatsune Miku: Project DIVA Arcade Version A Revision 2 (2011)
- Hatsune Miku: Project DIVA Arcade Version A Revision 3 (2011)
- Hatsune Miku: Project DIVA Arcade Version A Revision 3.1 (2011)
- Hatsune Miku: Project DIVA Arcade Version A Revision 4 (2012)
- Hatsune Miku: Project DIVA Arcade Version B (2012)
- Hatsune Miku: Project DIVA Arcade Version B Revision 1 (2012)
- Hatsune Miku: Project DIVA Arcade Version B Revision 2 (2012)
- Hatsune Miku: Project DIVA Arcade Version B Revision 3 (2013)

=== Project DIVA Arcade Future Tone ===
- Hatsune Miku: Project DIVA Arcade Future Tone (2013)
- Hatsune Miku: Project DIVA Arcade Future Tone Revision 1 (2013)
- Hatsune Miku: Project DIVA Arcade Future Tone Revision 2 (2013)
- Hatsune Miku: Project DIVA Arcade Future Tone Revision 3 (2014)
- Hatsune Miku: Project DIVA Arcade Future Tone Revision 4 (2014)
- Hatsune Miku: Project DIVA Arcade Future Tone Revision 5 (2014)
- Hatsune Miku: Project DIVA Arcade Future Tone Version A (2014)
- Hatsune Miku: Project DIVA Arcade Future Tone Version A Revision 1 (2014)
- Hatsune Miku: Project DIVA Arcade Future Tone Version A Revision 2 (2015)
- Hatsune Miku: Project DIVA Arcade Future Tone Version A Revision 3 (2015)
- Hatsune Miku: Project DIVA Arcade Future Tone Version A Revision 4.1 (2015)
- Hatsune Miku: Project DIVA Arcade Future Tone Version A Revision 5 (2015)
- Hatsune Miku: Project DIVA Arcade Future Tone Version A Revision 6 (2016)
- Hatsune Miku: Project DIVA Arcade Future Tone Version A Revision 6.1 (2016)
- Hatsune Miku: Project DIVA Arcade Future Tone Version B (2016)
- Hatsune Miku: Project DIVA Arcade Future Tone Version B Revision 1 (2016)
- Hatsune Miku: Project DIVA Arcade Future Tone Version B Revision 2 (2016)
- Hatsune Miku: Project DIVA Arcade Future Tone Version B Revision 3 (2016)

=== Project DIVA Future Tone ===
On September 15, 2015, during the SCEJA Press Conference at Tokyo Game Show 2015, Sega announced that the company was porting Hatsune Miku: Project DIVA Arcade Future Tone to the PlayStation 4 under the title Hatsune Miku: Project DIVA Future Tone. On May 27, 2016, a trailer for the game was released on the franchise's official YouTube channel, where it was revealed that the game would include two expansion packs available to download separately or together via the PlayStation Store; Future Sound and Colorful Tone. Future Sound contains songs originally featured in the mainstream Project DIVA games, while Colorful Tone contains songs originally featured in Project DIVA Arcade (some not included due to rights issues) and the Project Mirai games, as well as over 340 unlockable modules. A base demo software version of the game, Prelude, was also made available. In addition, the game supports a screen resolution of up to 4K at a refresh rate of 60 frames per second.

The game was released digitally on June 23, 2016 in Japan, with an international release following on January 10, 2017.

== Reception ==
Project DIVA Future Tone won the award for "Best Rhythm/Music Game" at Game Informer's Best of 2017 Awards, while it came in third place for the same category in their Reader's Choice Best of 2017 Awards. In addition, it was nominated for "Game, Music or Performance Based" at the National Academy of Video Game Trade Reviewers Awards.
