= Hatsune Miku: Project Diva F 2nd =

2014 video game

Hatsune Miku: Project DIVA F 2nd
- Japanese PlayStation 3 cover art
- Developer: Crypton Future Media
- Publisher: Sega
- Director: Tetsuya Otsubo
- Producer: Seiji Hayashi
- Artist: Hiroshi Fukazawa
- Series: Hatsune Miku: Project DIVA
- Platforms: PlayStation Vita, PlayStation 3
- Release: JP: March 27, 2014; NA: November 18, 2014; EU: November 21, 2014
- Genre: Rhythm game
- Mode: Single-player

Hatsune Miku: Project DIVA F 2nd (初音ミク -Project DIVA- F 2nd) is a 2014 rhythm game created by Sega and Crypton Future Media for the PlayStation Vita and PlayStation 3, and is the direct sequel to Hatsune Miku: Project DIVA F. The Vita version of the game is compatible with the PlayStation Vita TV system. The game was released in Japan on March 27, 2014, in North America on November 18, and in Europe on November 21 in the same year.

== Development ==
The game was publicly announced on 9 July 2013 in a preview for the July 25th issue of Enterbrain's Famitsu magazine. It was reported that at the time of the announcement, development of the game was 39% complete.

The character modules are designed by Kuushin, Nezuki, and Sakura/Alice. The full original cast from the previous game is set to be present in Project Diva F 2nd.

An initial preview playable demo for the PlayStation Vita featuring three songs was made available from 17 to 23 October 2013. A second demo was released on the Japanese PlayStation Network following the game's release.

Costume module, UI skin and rhythm game song downloadable content (DLC) was scheduled to be released every two weeks for a six-month period for both Japanese and Western regions. DLC began rolling out on December 9, 2014, for North America and Europe, and players within these regions were able to purchase DLC season passes.

== Gameplay ==
The game is set to have a similar play style to its predecessor, Hatsune Miku: Project DIVA F, whilst featuring new songs, returning songs from previous games, and character modules. New in-game mechanisms original to the game include sliding touchscreen notes, and double scratch notes. The DIVA room also features various minigames that can be played, including a clapping game. Another new addition to Project DIVA F 2nd over the previous game is the ability to change skins for the rhythm game mode, where decorative skin designs can be downloaded as DLC. The game features cross-save support between PS Vita and PS3 systems. The game tutorial, featuring "Ievan Polkka" just like the previous game, now also includes an extreme mode for advanced players in addition to the standard tutorial for beginners. Furthermore, lyric subtitles can now be shown in Japanese (Kanji or Romaji), English or Chinese, depending on the version.

When played on a PS Vita TV device, the rhythm game features will be available, however AR features relying on the handheld PS Vita's camera will not be accessible. The DualShock 3 controls will be identical to the PS3 version, and a timing adjustment function will be available to take into account of television display lag, just like with the PS3 version.

== Reception ==
The game was given a review score of 37/40 by Famitsu for the PS Vita version, and 36/40 for the PS3 version. PlayStation LifeStyle awarded the Vita version 7/10 and praised the familiar rhythmic gameplay, though said that the new songs were not as strong as the franchise's past offerings. Hardcore Gamer gave the game a 4/5, saying "At its core it may simply be more of the same tight, frantic rhythm gameplay found in its predecessor, but with intelligent additions and a robust track list, Project Diva F 2nd is an easy recommendation for returning fans and anyone looking for a concentrated dose of J-pop flair."

During the first week of release in Japan, the PS Vita version of the game sold 98,628 physical retail copies, ranking first place amongst all software sales in Japan within that week, whilst the PS3 version sold 59,965 physical retail copies, taking third place.

== Song list ==
A total of 42 playable songs are available in the game, in addition to another set of songs exclusively for AR Mode on the Vita and Live Studio on the PS3, and additional downloadable content released following the initial game release. Individual songs appearing within the game are listed below.

Song List
| Song name | Performed by | Producer |
|---|---|---|
| Ievan Polkka (Tutorial mode) | Hatsune Miku | Otomania |
| Melt (メルト, Meruto) | Hatsune Miku | ryo |
| Akatsuki Arrival (アカツキアライヴァル, Akatsuki Araivaru) | Hatsune Miku; Megurine Luka | Last Note |
| Packaged | Hatsune Miku | livetune |
| Glory Music (Glory 3usi9) | Hatsune Miku | Nanou |
| Two Breaths Walking (二息歩行, Nisoku Hokō) | Hatsune Miku | DECO*27 |
| Wintry Winds (番凩, Tsugai Kogarashi) | MEIKO; KAITO | hinayukki@sigotositeP |
| Love-Hate (スキキライ, Suki Kirai) | Kagamine Rin; Kagamine Len | HoneyWorks |
| Clover♣Club (クローバー♣クラブ, Kurōbā Kurabu) | Hatsune Miku | Yuuyu-P |
| Miracle Paint (ミラクルペイント, Mirakuru Peinto) | Hatsune Miku | OSTER project |
| Pinky Swear (指切り, Yubikiri) | Hatsune Miku | Scop |
| Colorful × Melody (カラフル×メロディ, Karafuru×Merodī) | Hatsune Miku; Kagamine Rin | Team MOER |
| Blackjack | Megurine Luka | Yucha-P |
| Clockwork Clown (からくりピエロ, Karakuri Piero) | Hatsune Miku | 40mP |
| Thousand Year Solo (千年の独奏歌, Sennen no Dokusōka) | KAITO | yanagiP |
| Doubleganger (なりすましゲンガー, Narisumashi Gengā) | Kagamine Rin; Hatsune Miku | KulfiQ |
| Meltdown (炉心融解, Roshin Yūkai) | Kagamine Rin | iroha(sasaki) |
| Luka Luka ★ Night Fever (ルカルカ★ナイトフィーバー, Ruka Ruka★Naito Fībā) | Megurine Luka | samfree |
| Knife | Kagamine Rin; Hatsune Miku; Kagamine Len | Rerulili |
| Sakura Rain (桜ノ雨, Sakura no Ame) | Hatsune Miku | halyosy |
| This is the Happiness and Peace of Mind Committee (こちら、幸福安心委員会です。, Kochira, Kōfuku Anshin Iinkai Desu.) | Hatsune Miku | Utata-P |
| Cantarella ~Grace Edition~ (カンタレラ ~grace edition~, Kantarera -grace edition-) | KAITO; Hatsune Miku | Kurousa-P |
| SPiCa -39's Giving Day Edition- (Note: This song is based on Miku no Hi Kanshasai 39's Giving Day (ミクの日感謝祭 39's Giving Day) at Zepp Tokyo, held on March 9, 2010.) | Hatsune Miku | Toku-P |
| Hello, Worker | Megurine Luka | KEI |
| Romeo and Cinderella (ロミオとシンデレラ, Romio to Shinderera) | Hatsune Miku | doriko |
| I'll Miku-Miku You♪ [For Reals] (みくみくにしてあげる♪【してやんよ】, Miku Miku ni Shite Ageru♪ [Shite Yan yo]) | Hatsune Miku | ika_mo |
| Meteor (メテオ) | Hatsune Miku | John Zeroness |
| Heart (ココロ, Kokoro) | Kagamine Rin | Toraboruta |
| Break It, Break It! (壊せ壊せ, Kowase Kowase) | MEIKO | ELVN |
| Soundless Voice | Kagamine Len | Hitoshizuku & Yama△ |
| Close and Open, Demons and the Dead (結んで開いて羅刹と骸, Musunde Hiraite Rasetsu to Mukuro) | Hatsune Miku | Hachi |
| Erase or Zero | KAITO; Kagamine Len | Crystal-P |
| Double Lariat (ダブルラリアット, Daburu Rariatto) | Megurine Luka | Agoaniki |
| Paradichlorobenzene (パラジクロロベンゼン, Parajikurorobenzen) | Kagamine Len | Owata-P |
| Kagerou Daze (カゲロウデイズ, Kagerō Deizu) (Note: English and Chinese subtitles for this song are not available in the English and Chinese versions, respectively. Therefore, Japanese Kanji and Romaji subtitles must be used instead as an optional choice in their respective versions.) | Hatsune Miku | Jin |
| Two-Sided Lovers (裏表ラバーズ, Ura-Omote Rabāzu) | Hatsune Miku | wowaka |
| Envy Cat Walk (エンヴィキャットウォーク, Envi Kyatto Wōku) | Hatsune Miku | Tohma |
| The World is Mine (ワールドイズマイン, Wārudo Izu Main) | Hatsune Miku | ryo |
| Decorator | Hatsune Miku | livetune |
| The Intense Voice of Hatsune Miku (初音ミクの激唱, Hatsune Miku no Gekishō) | Hatsune Miku | cosMo@bousou-P |
| 2D Dream Fever (二次元ドリームフィーバー, Nijigen Dorīmu Fībā) | Hatsune Miku | PolyphonicBranch |
| Sweet Devil | Hatsune Miku | Hachioji-P |
| Cat Food (キャットフード, Kyatto Fūdo) | Hatsune Miku | doriko |
| Hello, Worker (Live Edition) | Megurine Luka | KEI |
| Erase or Zero (Live Edition) | KAITO; Kagamine Len | Crystal-P |
| Piano × Forte × Scandal (ピアノ×フォルテ×スキャンダル, Piano×Forute×Sukyandaru) | MEIKO | OSTER project |
| Love-Hate (Live Edition) (スキキライ (Live Edition), Suki Kirai (Live Edition)) | Kagamine Rin; Kagamine Len | HoneyWorks |
| Tokyo Teddy Bear (東京テディベア, Tōkyō Tedibea) | Kagamine Rin | Neru |
| glow | Hatsune Miku | keeno |
| Tell Your World (DLC) | Hatsune Miku | livetune |
| ODDS&ENDS (DLC) | Hatsune Miku | ryo |
| Sekiranun Graffiti (積乱雲グラフィティ, Sekiran'un Gurafiti) | Hatsune Miku | ryo |
| Aikotoba (愛言葉, Ai Kotoba) | Hatsune Miku | DECO*27 |
| Look This Way, Baby (こっち向いて Baby, Kotchi Muite Bebī) | Hatsune Miku | ryo |
| Yellow | Hatsune Miku | livetune |
| Change Me | MEIKO | shu-t |
| Rolling Girl (ローリンガール, Rōrin Gāru) | Hatsune Miku | wowaka |
| Solitude's End (孤独の果て, Kodoku no Hate) | Kagamine Rin; Kagamine Len | Hikari Shuuyou |
| To the End of Infinity (那由他の彼方まで, Nayuta no Kanata Made) | Kagamine Len; Kagamine Rin | Tsurishi-P |
| Just Be Friends | Megurine Luka | Dixie Flatline |
| magnet | Hatsune Miku; Megurine Luka | minato |
| Rosary Pale | KAITO | Shinjou-P |
| Promise | Kagamine Rin; Hatsune Miku | samfree |
| Marginal (マージナル, Mājinaru) | Hatsune Miku | OSTER Project |
| When First Love Ends (初めての恋が終わる時, Hajimete no Koi ga Owaru Toki) | Hatsune Miku | ryo |
| Electric Angel (えれくとりっく・えんじぇぅ, Erekutorikku Enjeu) | Hatsune Miku | Yasuo-P |
| Though My Song Has No Form (歌に形はないけれど, Uta ni Katachi wa Nai Keredo) | Hatsune Miku | doriko |

- Songs with no background are new songs first introduced in Project DIVA F 2nd.
- Songs with a light-blue background are returning songs from earlier Project DIVA games with remastered PVs that features a new Chance Time sequence, with the exception of Ievan Polkka in the Tutorial Mode.
- Songs with a green background are returning songs from earlier Project DIVA games with new PVs.
- Songs with an orange background are playable DLC songs, and must be purchased on the PlayStation Network.
- Songs with a yellow background are songs only available in AR Live Mode or Live Stage Mode, all based on Magical Mirai 2013 (マジカルミライ2013) at Yokohama Arena, held on August 30, 2013.
