= Hatsune Miku: Project Diva F =

2012 video game

Hatsune Miku: Project DIVA F
- North American PlayStation 3 cover art
- Developers: Sega; Crypton Future Media
- Publisher: Sega
- Director: Tetsuya Otsubo
- Producer: Seiji Hayashi
- Designer: Michiaki Osuga
- Programmer: Hideki Tanaka
- Artist: Hiroshi Fukazawa
- Series: Hatsune Miku: Project DIVA
- Platforms: PlayStation Vita, PlayStation 3
- Release: PlayStation Vita: JP: August 30, 2012; NA: March 4, 2014; EU: March 12, 2014; PlayStation 3: JP: March 7, 2013; NA: August 27, 2013; EU: September 4, 2013
- Genre: Rhythm game
- Mode: Single-player

Hatsune Miku: Project DIVA f (Japanese: 初音ミク -Project DIVA- f) is a 2012 rhythm game created by Sega and Crypton Future Media for the PlayStation Vita and PlayStation 3. It was released on the PlayStation Vita in Japan on August 30, 2012, as the fifth entry in the Hatsune Miku: Project DIVA series.

The game debuted at Sony's E3 2012 booth in June 2012 under the name of Hatsune Miku so as to gauge interest for the game. Like previous games in the series, the game primarily makes use of Vocaloids, a series of singing synthesizer software, and the songs created using these Vocaloids, most notably the virtual-diva Hatsune Miku.

A PlayStation 3 version of the game, titled Hatsune Miku: Project DIVA F (Japanese: 初音ミク -Project DIVA- F) (the only difference being the title uses a capital F as opposed to the original Vita version's lowercase f) was released on March 7, 2013. This version was released physically and digitally in North America on August 27, 2013, making it the first game in the Project DIVA series to be released in the West. It was originally scheduled to be released in Europe at the same time, but instead released one week later, on September 4, 2013, as a digital download-only title. The PlayStation Vita version was later released in North America and Europe in March 2014, both as digital download-only titles as well. This therefore makes it the first game in the series to be multi-platform, with it being developed simultaneously for the PlayStation Vita and PlayStation 3, though there are some differences with regards to control schemes.

A sequel to the game, titled Hatsune Miku: Project DIVA F 2nd, was released for the PlayStation 3 and PlayStation Vita on March 27, 2014, in Japan, November 18, 2014, in North America, and November 21, 2014, in Europe.

== Gameplay ==
The game retains the same basic gameplay mechanics from the series albeit with several new changes, most notably the addition of the "Star" symbol to the game's existing symbols of cross, circle, square, triangle and arrows. The "Star" symbol represents the "Scratch" move where instead of pressing the face buttons as usual, players rub the screen or flick the analogue stick, depending on which system is being used.

In-game screenshot during the new "Technical Zone" of the game. Note the new "Star" symbols in the game.

"Chance Time" has been modified from previous installments, with each successful beat filling a star shaped gauge on the bottom left of the screen. When filled, it triggers a final scratch symbol that, if successfully scored, will change the outcome of the scene. Another new mechanic is the "Technical Zone" mechanic. When it occurs during a song, players must maintain an uninterrupted combo within that time limit for bonus points. Additional features like DIVA Room and Edit Mode also return with additional features.

The game features graphical improvements over its predecessors in light of the PlayStation Vita's higher processing power compared to the PlayStation Portable. The models in the game are also based on the PlayStation Portable predecessors rather than the Dreamy Theater models, which have a slightly different art style. There are also improvements in the animations of the characters, such as smoother movements for Miku's hair and Rin's ribbons; the game also features improved facial expressions and lighting with real-time lighting computation being added into the game.

== Development ==
Development for the game first began in 2011 before the previous entry in the series, Hatsune Miku: Project DIVA Extend. The game is jointly developed by the development teams behind the PlayStation Portable entries in the series, as well as the team behind the Project DIVA Arcade entry in the series. A new entry in the Project DIVA series was first teased by Sega on Christmas Day 2011, when Sega released a teaser video on YouTube with footage of Hatsune Miku singing two different songs and the words "Coming 2012" at the end of the trailer. On April 9, 2012, Sega posted a teaser site online announcing that they would be revealing the next entry in the Project DIVA series on April 12, 2012. The game was then officially revealed on April 12, 2012, as a multiplatform game for both the PlayStation Vita and PlayStation 3, making the series' official debut on both platforms (both Dreamy Theater software for the PS3 were not actual full games for the console.) A "store-front trailer" showed off a new feature – officially called "Photo Studio". Development would be focused on the PlayStation Vita first before being shifted over to the PlayStation 3 at the later part of its development cycle, and hence the former version would release earlier in 2012 with the latter version releasing in 2013. The release date for the PlayStation Vita version of the game was later announced as August 20, 2012 in an issue of Japanese gaming magazine Dengeki PlayStation.

The game was also present at a booth at the Electronic Entertainment Expo 2012, where a partially translated version of the game was playable. The game featured two songs, both in Japanese as well as Japanese Kanji lyric subtitles, but with English menu items. The demo was placed there in order to gauge interest for the game for a potential localization and the response was said to be good, although there were no official plans to localize the game at the time.

On March 7, 2013, the day of the PlayStation 3 version's Japanese release, Sega posted an image of Miku on their English Facebook page, asking fans to like and share the image if they would like to see the PlayStation 3 version of the game released in Western territories. On June 6, 2013, Sega confirmed the game would be released in Western territories in August 2013. A retail release in North America was announced, as well as a digital release on the PlayStation Network in North America and Europe. In November 2013, the PlayStation Vita version was announced for digital release in North America and Europe in March 2014. The English version features Japanese Romaji lyric subtitles, as akin to the Japanese Kanji lyric subtitles in the Japanese version.

== Reception ==
The PS Vita version of Hatsune Miku: Project DIVA f took first place on the Japanese sales charts in its debut week, selling 159,592 physical retail copies. The PS3 version released one year later sold 110,229 physical retail copies within its debut week in Japan, also topping the weekly charts. By 20 April 2013, Sega announced that the game shipped a total of 390,000 copies across both platforms.

PlayStation LifeStyle's import review was very favorable, calling the main portion of the rhythm game "as solid as they come" and recommending it to importers. The PS3 version received a review score of 35/40 from Famitsu.

According to Metacritic, the PS Vita version garnered generally favorable reviews, while the PS3 version's reviews were more mixed.

== Song list ==
There are a total of 38 songs available between Hatsune Miku: Project DIVA f/F. (6 songs returning from previous games) 6 songs are only available through AR Live Mode on the Vita and Live Studio Mode on the PS3, 1 song is DLC and must be purchased from the PlayStation Network, which is only in the Japanese version. The 6 Bonus Songs are included with Project DIVA F on the PS3, but were released as DLC for the Vita version of the game.

Song List
Song Name	Performed by	Producer
Ievan Polkka (tutorial and Edit mode only)	Hatsune Miku	Otomania
Cat Food (キャットフード, Kyatto Fūdo)	Hatsune Miku	doriko
Secret Police (秘密警察, Himitsu Keisatsu)	Hatsune Miku	Buriru-P
Melancholic (メランコリック, Merankorikku)	Kagamine Rin	Junky
Weekender Girl	Hatsune Miku	livetune, Hachioji-P
Time Machine (タイムマシン, Taimu Mashin)	Hatsune Miku	1640mP
DYE	Megurine Luka	AVTechNO
Fire◎Flower	Kagamine Len	halyosy
Summer Idol (サマーアイドル, Samā Aidoru)	Hatsune Miku; Kagamine Rin	OSTER project
ACUTE	Hatsune Miku; Megurine Luka; KAITO	Kurousa-P
Urbandonment (トリノコシティ, Torinoko Shiti)	Hatsune Miku	40mP
What Do You Mean!? (どういうことなの！？, Dō Iu Koto Nano!?)	Hatsune Miku	Kuchibashi-P
Stay With Me	MEIKO	shu-tP
Hm? Ah, Yes. (え？あぁ、そう。, E? Ā, Sō.)	Hatsune Miku	Chouchou-P
Remote Controller (リモコン, Rimokon)	Kagamine Rin; Kagamine Len	Jesus-P
Ashes to Ashes (ハイハハイニ, Hai wa Hai ni)	KAITO	Tennen
WORLD'S END UMBRELLA	Hatsune Miku	Hachi
FREELY TOMORROW	Hatsune Miku	Mitchie M
Monochrome∞Blue Sky (モノクロ∞ブルースカイ, Monokuro∞Burū Sukai)	Hatsune Miku	Noboru↑
Glasses (MEGANE)	Megurine Luka	Ultra-Noob
Kagamine HachiHachi Flower Fight (鏡音八八花合戦, Kagamine Hachi Hachi Hana Kassen)	Kagamine Rin; Kagamine Len	Moja-P
World's End Dance Hall (ワールズエンド・ダンスホール, Wāruzu Endo Dansu Hōru)	Hatsune Miku; Megurine Luka	wowaka
The MMORPG Addict's Anthem (ネトゲ廃人シュプレヒコール, Netoge Haijin Shupurehikōru; Online Game Addicts Sprechchor)	Hatsune Miku	Satsuki Ga Tenkomori
Nostalogic	MEIKO	Yuukiss
Nyanyanyanyanyanyanya!	Hatsune Miku	daniwell
Unhappy Refrain (アンハッピーリフレイン, Anhappī Rifurein)	Hatsune Miku	wowaka
ODDS&ENDS	Hatsune Miku	ryo
Tengaku (天樂, Tengaku)	Kagamine Rin	Yuuyu-P
God-Tier Tune (神曲, Kami Kyoku)	Hatsune Miku	Anyuu-P
Black★Rock Shooter (ブラック★ロックシューター, Burakku★Rokku Shūtā)	Hatsune Miku	ryo
Negaposi*Continues (ネガポジ＊コンティニューズ, Negapoji*Kontinyūzu)	Hatsune Miku	sasakure.UK
Sadistic.Music∞Factory	Hatsune Miku	cosMo
Continuing Dream (夢の続き, Yume no Tsuzuki)	Hatsune Miku; Megurine Luka; Kagamine Rin; Kagamine Len	Dixie Flatline
World is Mine (ワールドイズマイン, Wārudo Izu Main)	Hatsune Miku	ryo
Miracle Paint (ミラクルペイント, Mirakuru Peinto)	Hatsune Miku	OSTER project
I'll Miku-Miku You♪ [For Reals] (みくみくにしてあげる♪【してやんよ】, Miku Miku ni Shite Ageru♪ [Shite Yan yo])	Hatsune Miku	ika
1/6 – out of the gravity	Hatsune Miku	Vocaliod-P
Weekender Girl (Live Mode)	Hatsune Miku	livetune, Hachioji-P
ODDS&ENDS (Live Mode)	Hatsune Miku	ryo
Time Machine (Live Mode) (タイムマシン (Live Mode), Taimu Mashin (Live Mode)	Hatsune Miku	1640mP
39 (DLC)	Hatsune Miku	DECO*27 x sasakure.UK
PoPiPo Special edition (ぽっぴっぽー Special edition, Poppippō Special edition)	Hatsune Miku	LamazeP
Tell Your World	Hatsune Miku	livetune
Dream-Eating Monochrome Baku (夢喰い白黒バク, Yumekui Shirokuro Baku)	Kagamine Len	Nem
Sweet Devil	Hatsune Miku	Hachioji-P
Tokyo Teddy Bear (東京テディベア, Tōkyō Tedibea)	Kagamine Rin	Neru
Rin-chan Now! (リンちゃんなう!, Rin-chan Nau!)	Hatsune Miku; Megurine Luka	Owata-P
Senbonzakura (千本桜)	Hatsune Miku	Kurousa-P

- Songs with a light-blue background are returning songs from previous games.
- Songs with a yellow background are songs only available in 'AR Live Mode' for the Vita and 'Live Stage Mode' for the PS3, all based on DAIBA de DIVA at Tokyo Joypolis, held from August 14 to September 2, 2012.
- Songs with an orange background are DLC and must be purchased on the PlayStation Network to be played. (Japanese version only)
- Songs with a green background are new songs in Project DIVA F for the PS3. They were released as DLC for the Vita version of the game.
