= Hatsune Miku and Future Stars: Project Mirai =

2012 video game

- Developer: Sega
- Publisher: Sega
- Series: Hatsune Miku: Project DIVA
- Platform: Nintendo 3DS
- Release: JP: March 8, 2012
- Genre: Rhythm game
- Mode: Single-player

Hatsune Miku and Future Stars: Project Mirai (初音ミク and Future Stars Project mirai) is a 2012 rhythm game created by Sega and Crypton Future Media for the Nintendo 3DS. The game is a spin-off of the Hatsune Miku: Project DIVA series of Vocaloid rhythm games and was first released on March 8, 2012, in Japan with no international release. Like the original, the game primarily makes use of Vocaloids, a series of singing synthesizer software, and the songs created using them, most notably the virtual-diva Vocaloid Hatsune Miku. It is also the first game in the franchise to include a Vocaloid made by Internet Co., Ltd.; the mascot of Megpoid, Gumi, appears as a guest star.

A sequel to the game, titled Hatsune Miku: Project Mirai 2, was released in Japan on November 28, 2013. On July 2, 2014, it was announced that an enhanced version of the sequel, titled Hatsune Miku: Project Mirai DX, was in development for a 2015 release. On September 8, 2015, the game was released in North America.

== Gameplay ==
In-game screenshot featuring a chibi Hatsune Miku. Note the pointer of the circle and the series of buttons behind it.

As the game is a spin-off from the Project DIVA series, there are numerous differences between the game and the original series. Most prominent of which is the art style of the game as the characters appear as their Nendoroid-style, super deformed versions in which characters have heads that are three times the normal size and not proportionate to the body. Though the game is still a rhythm game, the way the gameplay mechanics work is entirely different. In addition the game does not feature the Edit Mode of the Project DIVA series, while the DIVA Room Mode is replaced by the game's My Room mode whereby players similarly get to interact with their modules in a room. The game includes an Augmented reality mode, where the characters will appear on AR cards viewed with the Nintendo 3DS camera.

For the game's primary gameplay, its music mode, it uses what it calls the "Chance Circle System". Buttons will appear around the border of a circle, and a pointer will appear from the center of the circle extending all the way outside the circle's border. It will then turn in a clockwise or counter-clockwise manner according to the song and when the pointer passes the button, the player has to press the face button on the 3DS. Similar to the series, the player's time accuracy will also be rated on a similar scale and manner that will be displayed on the bottom of the screen. The music videos of the songs in-game are partly animations of the characters like in the previous games, but some songs include the original music video with additional 3D effects. As opposed to the previous games, changing the character will also change the voice in the song in some cases. A few songs also have a change in the lyrics when sung by a different character.

== Development ==
Development of the game began in mid-2010 and was only officially announced in September 2011 as Hatsune Miku -Project Mirai-. In November 2011, Famitsu unveiled the game's final name Hatsune Miku and Future Stars: Project Mirai (the word Mirai meaning "future"). This marks the first time a game in the series has changed its working name for the final release. The game was released in Japan on March 8, 2012, in a limited edition that included a Nendoroid Puchi figure of Hatsune Miku.

== Song list ==
Project Mirai contains a total of 23 songs (39 if alternate-vocal versions are counted).

Song List
Song Name	Performed by	Producer
My Time (私の時間, Watashi no Jikan)	Hatsune Miku or Kagamine Rin or Kagamine Len	Kuchibashi-P
Finder (DSLR remix - re:edit)	Hatsune Miku	kz (livetune)
reverse rainbow (逆さまレインボー, Sakasama reinbō)	Hatsune Miku; Kagamine Rin or Kagamine Rin; Kagamine Len or Hatsune Miku; Megurine Luka	sunriverz
Tricolore Airline (トリコロール・エア・ライン, Torikorōru ea rain)	Hatsune Miku or Kagamine Rin or Megurine Luka or MEIKO	atsuzoukun
Animal Fortune-telling (どうぶつ占い, Dōbutsu uranai)	Hatsune Miku or Kagamine Rin or Megurine Luka or MEIKO	Scop
Cendrillon (サンドリヨン, Sandoriyon)	Hatsune Miku; KAITO	Dios/Signal-P
Adolescence (アドレサンス, Adoresansu)	Kagamine Rin; Kagamine Len	Dios/Signal-P
No Logic	Megurine Luka	JimmyThumb-P
on the rocks	MEIKO; KAITO	OSTER project
Mousou Sketch (妄想スケッチ, Mousou suketchi; Delusion Sketch)	Hatsune Miku or Kagamine Rin	40mP; Signal-P (voice manipulation for Rin version)
Daughter of Evil (悪ノ娘, Aku no musume)	Kagamine Rin	mothy
Servant of Evil (悪ノ召使, Aku no meshitsukai)	Kagamine Len	mothy
SING&SMILE	Hatsune Miku or Kagamine Rin or Kagamine Len or Megurine Luka or MEIKO or KAITO	Re:nG
PIANO*GIRL	Hatsune Miku	OSTER project
Melancholic (メランコリック, Merankorikku)	Kagamine Rin	Junky
Hello/How are you? (ハロ／ハワユ, Haro/Hawayu)	Hatsune Miku	Hoehoe-P
LOL -lots of laugh-	Hatsune Miku	KeN
Deep Sea Girl (深海少女, Shinkai shōjo)	Hatsune Miku	Yuuyu-P
Your Heat (君の体温, Kimi no taion)	Hatsune Miku	Kuwagata-P
Matryoshka (マトリョシカ, Matoryoshika)	Hatsune Miku; Gumi	Hachi
Happy Synthesizer (ハッピーシンセサイザ, Happī Shinsesaiza)	Megurine Luka; Gumi	EasyPop
YUMEYUME (ゆめゆめ, Yumeyume; Dream Dream)	Hatsune Miku	DECO*27
Clover♣Club (クローバー♣クラブ, Kurōbā♣Kurabu)	Hatsune Miku; KAITO (guest)	Yuuyu-P

- Songs with a bright yellow background are returning songs from previous games with new videos.
