= Hatsune Miku – The Planet of Wonder and Fragments of Wishes =

- Developer: Crypton Future Media
- Publisher: Komodo
- Platforms: Nintendo Switch; Windows; Xbox One; Xbox Series X and Series S
- Release: June 7, 2023: Switch; June 7, 2023; Windows, Xbox One, Xbox Series X/S; April 22, 2024
- Genre: Adventure

Hatsune Miku – The Planet of Wonder and Fragments of Wishes is a 2023 adventure game developed by Crypton Future Media and published by Komodo. It focuses on Hatsune Miku and other Vocaloid characters developed by Crypton, as they complete different minigames to collect star fragments to repair their damaged spaceship. The player is awarded with coins for each minigame they complete, which can then be spent to unlock character outfits and music.

The game was initially released on Nintendo Switch on June 7, 2023, with versions for Windows, Xbox One, and Xbox Series X and Series S releasing in 2024. The Planet of Wonder and Fragments of Wishes received mixed reviews from critics, who criticized the game's lack of content and price.

== Gameplay ==
Hatsune Miku – The Planet of Wonder and Fragments of Wishes is an adventure game and minigame compilation. It is centered on the Vocaloid characters created by Crypton Future Media: Hatsune Miku, Kagamine Rin and Len, Megurine Luka, Kaito, and Meiko. While the group were traveling throughout space, a shooting star collided with their spaceship, forcing them to come to an emergency stop in a small town to collect enough star fragments to repair their spaceship.

Each minigame rewards the player with a star fragment, with there being nine minigames in total. Examples of minigames include having to collect falling apples from trees, a rhythm game mode focused on repeating drum patterns, and carrying blocks without falling over. The player also receives coins for each minigame they complete, which can be spent to unlock character outfits and music. Each minigame also features online leaderboards.

== Release and reception ==
Reception

Review scores
Publication	Score
Nintendo Life	4/10
TouchArcade	2.5/5
Digitally Downloaded	4/5

The Planet of Wonder and Fragments of Wishes was developed by Crypton Future Media and published by Komodo. It was initially released on June 7, 2023, for the Nintendo Switch. On April 22, 2024, the game was released for Windows via Steam, Xbox One, and Xbox Series X and Series S.

The game received mixed reviews from critics. PJ O'Reilly of Nintendo Life criticized the game's lack of content, arguing that the game could be completed in under an hour and had no replayability, with the game's offerings not enough to play through it again in pursuit of unlockable content. He also found the game to not be challenging enough. Matt S. of Digitally Downloaded felt that the game, while lacking in content, was polished and an enjoyable experience. He also praised the game's story, praising it for being one of the first attempts to add a story to a Hatsune Miku game and seeing it as a potential gateway for story-focused games later on. Mikhail Madnani of Touch Arcade said that, while fans of Hatsune Miku might enjoy the game, the base price of $30 made it hard to recommend for the lack of content. O'Reilly also criticized the price.
