= Miku Expo =

Concert tours featuring Hatsune Miku

Hatsune Miku Expo
- World tour by Hatsune Miku
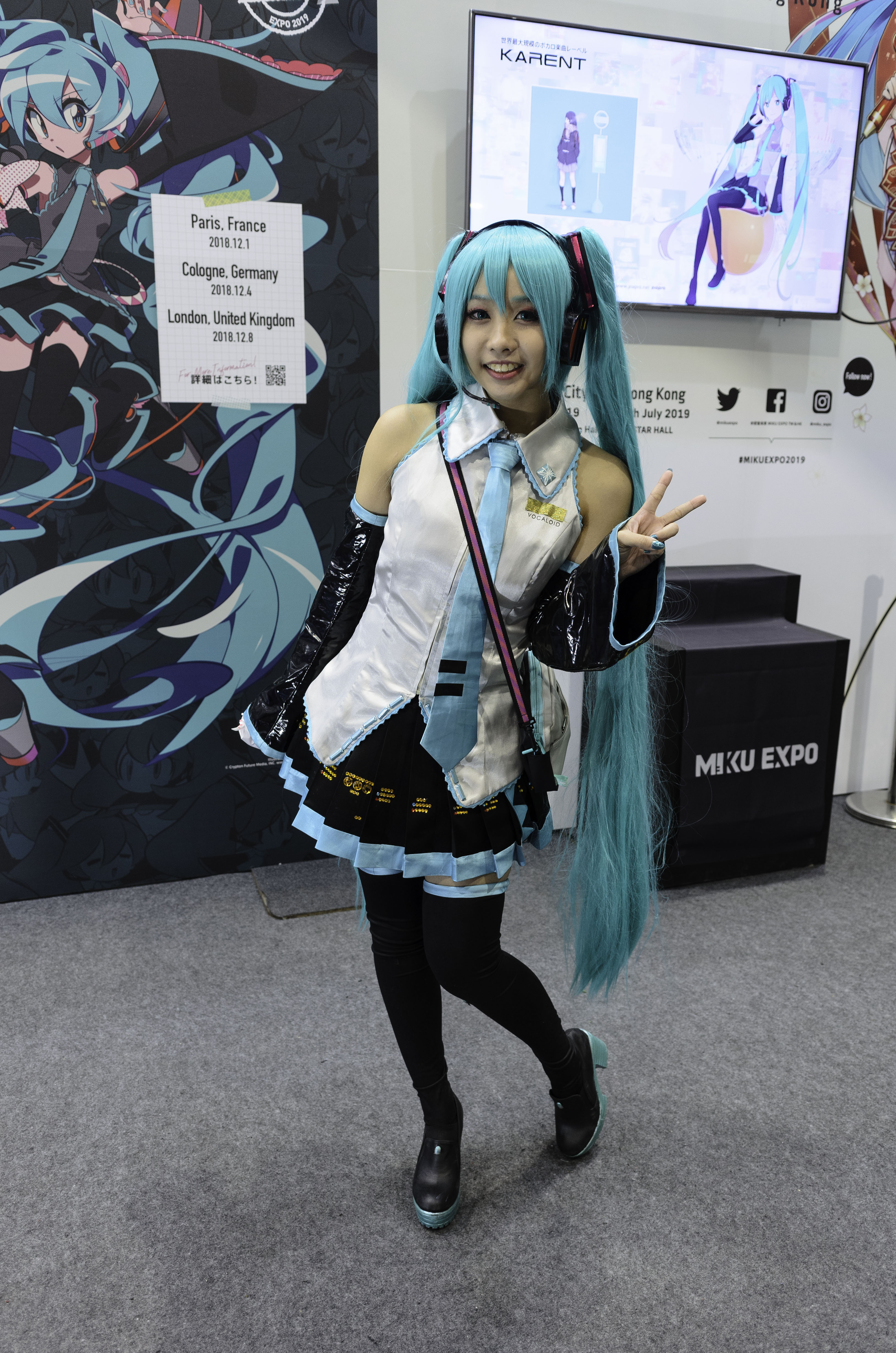
- Cosplay of Hatsune Miku in Taipei promoting Miku Expo 2019
- Start date: May 28, 2014
- No. of shows: 91 (as of 2025)
- Attendance: over 20,000 (record for a single performance)
- Website: mikuexpo.com

Hatsune Miku Expo (stylized in all caps) is a series of world tours organized by Crypton Future Media starring the virtual singing software character Hatsune Miku. The performances include notable user-created Vocaloid songs and digital choreography of Miku dancing, projected onto glass screens. The pre-recorded Miku vocals are backed by a live instrumental band. The tour started on May 28, 2014, in Jakarta, Indonesia, with new shows added every year, with the exception of 2021, 2022 and 2023 where Hatsune Miku-related events were held virtually and livestreamed on platforms such as Twitch, YouTube and Niconico. In-person Miku Expo shows were resumed on April 4, 2024, in Vancouver, Canada. As of 2024, the tour consisted of 82 shows spanning the continents of Asia, North America, Europe and Oceania. The largest attendance for a Miku Expo performance will be over 20,000 at both the O² Arena in London and Accor Arena in Paris for the Europe 2026 tour.

The latest show, and the last show of Miku Expo 2026 North America, was set on May 19, 2026, in Mexico City, Mexico. The latest scheduled tour is Miku Expo 2026 Europe, scheduled from November 12 to 27.

== Performance ==
Hatsune Miku's performance at AFAS Live in Amsterdam, The Netherlands, in 2026

Miku Expo concerts feature Hatsune Miku performing original songs created by fans. Miku's pre-recorded synthesized vocals are backed by a four-piece rock band consisting of a guitarist, a bassist, a drummer and a keyboardist. (except at Miku Expo Europe 2018, where a second guitarist was present making a five-piece rock band)

Alongside Miku, the rest of the Vocaloid characters created by Crypton Future Media – Kagamine Rin & Len, Megurine Luka, Meiko and Kaito – perform on stage. Computer-animated images of the characters dancing are projected onto transparent glass screens to produce a hologram-like illusion. Since 2024, an LED screen was used instead.

=== Digital Stars ===
Alongside the main Miku Expo performance, a club event called Digital Stars has been hosted since 2016 in selected cities, featuring DJ sets from Vocaloid producers, especially those from the city or region the event is held in, though Japanese producers also often participate in overseas Digital Stars events. Unlike Miku Expo, it continued throughout the COVID-19 pandemic with live-streamed events online, eventually returning to in-person events. During that time, it expanded, and has also been held at Magical Mirai, the Niigata Festival, Snow Miku (Sapporo Snow Festival), and Yomiuriland, though it remains primarily a sub-event of Miku Expo.

It has been held at Miku Expo events in Berlin, Chicago, Hong Kong, Los Angeles, New York, San Francisco, Seattle, Singapore, Seoul, and Toronto, and at other events in Fukuoka, Nagoya, Niigata, Osaka, Sapporo, and Tokyo. Past guests have included Akane Yomitan (of Hifumi, Inc.), Atols, Baker, Camellia, Capchii, CircusP, Emon(Tes.), Hachioji P, Hiiragi Magnetite, Hylen, Iosys Trax, Jamie Paige (individually and with Flavor Foley), Kat, Kira, Kotonohouse (online), Kz (of Livetune), Lupo Ichinose, Maigo Hasegawa (of CDs), Maozon, MonochroMenace, Namigroove (of CDs), PinocchioP (online), Tak, Utsu-P (online), Wonderful Opportunity, Xaneiro (of CDs), Yunosuke, Yuyoyuppe, and Yuzen (of Hifumi, Inc.), among many others.

== Production ==
The graphics for the shows are created by Sega and Marza Animation Planet. For the 2024 tours, Marza was responsibe for partial production of character modelling, character set-up and animation. The dancing is originally performed by humans and transferred to 3D models using motion and light reflection capture.

=== Song contest ===
The first Hatsune Miku Expo Song Contest was held from August 26 to October 19, 2015, leading up to the Miku Expo 2016 tour. The contest for original songs featuring Hatsune Miku vocals was open internationally and gathered submissions though SoundCloud. A trial version of Hatsune Miku V3 English was released alongside the contest. The winning song, selected by Crypton staff, was to be performed live at Miku Expo concerts. The grand prize winner, "Ten Thousand Stars", an electronic dance music track produced by CircusP, was announced on November 26. Circus tuned the Miku English vocals to a middle ground between robotic and human-sounding, sacrificing machine perfection for a sense of humanity. A pre-recorded version of the song, backed by a live band, was performed on all concerts in the 2016 tour.

A similar contest was held for Miku Expo 2018 USA & Mexico, from December 27, 2017, to January 31, 2018. This time allowing vocals by all six Vocaloid characters created by Crypton. The winning entry was "Can't Make A Song!!" by Beat_shobon, featuring Miku singing in English. The song was performed during the 2018 USA & Mexico tour (but not during the Europe tour later that year).

The 5th anniversary of Miku Expo saw the song contest returning to its roots, allowing only Hatsune Miku vocals. The contest was held from September 27 to October 31, 2019, having the winning entry be performed live at Miku Expo 2020 Europe. The winning song was "MikuFiesta", a salsa produced by AlexTrip Sands, featuring vocals in Spanish.

== History ==
=== 2010s ===
The first Miku Expo was held in 2014 in Jakarta, Indonesia and in the United States, specifically in Los Angeles and New York City. The theme song for the tour was "Sharing The World", produced by Bighead.

Miku Expo 2015 was held on June 26 and 27 in Shanghai, China.

Miku Expo 2016 was held in Japan from March 23 to April 10, in North America from April 23 to June 5, in Taiwan from June 25 and 26, and in China on December 3 and 4 in Shanghai, and on December 10 and 11 in Beijing. Anamanaguchi was the opening act for the North American tour.

Miku Expo 2017 was held on December 16 in Kuala Lumpur, Malaysia.

Miku Expo 2018 was held from June 29 until July 19 in the United States and Mexico, and on December 1 until 8 in Paris, France; Cologne, Germany; and London, England.

Miku Expo 2019 was held on May 11 in Taiwan and on July 27 in Hong Kong.

=== 2020s ===
Miku Expo 2020 took place in Europe on January 11 to 28, in London, Paris, Berlin, Amsterdam, and Barcelona. A United States and Canada tour was originally scheduled to take place in April and May, but it was postponed to the following year after initially rescheduling to September and October, and later cancelled due to the COVID-19 pandemic.

In October 2020, a virtual livestream performance online was announced and funded by a Kickstarter crowdfunding campaign that ran for 2 months starting on November 12, 2020, and raised over JP¥60,000,000 (approximately US$550,000), more than double its intended target of JP¥25,000,000 (approximately US$230,000) and took place on June 6, 2021.

Miku Expo Rewind was held on June 5, 2022. Unlike previous years, this event consisted of a specially-curated compilation of performances of songs that were recorded at past Miku Expo concerts, many of which had not been released beforehand. In addition, a variety of online sub-events, exhibitions, and workshops were also held in conjunction with the event. A second online event, "Miku Expo Rewind+" was also held on November 6 of the same year.

Miku Expo VR took place on November 12, 2023.

In September 2023, it was announced that Miku Expo 2024 will celebrate their 10th anniversary with a tour across North America, with tour dates scheduled to take place from April to May. In March of the following year, it was also announced that there would also be a tour in Europe, scheduled in October and November. In July, a tour in New Zealand and Australia was announced, scheduled from November 15 to 26, marking Miku's first appearance in these countries.

The 2024 tour was the first to use LED screens to display the virtual performers, as opposed to the commonly used Rear projection techniques (wrongly marketed as "hologram") used at previous Miku Expo tours. The fans at the first showing (April 4, Vancouver) did not expect this change and voiced their frustration and disappointment on social media. Kotaku reported the change as a "drop in quality". On April 12, Crypton Future Media confirmed that the LED screen will be used throughout the North America and Europe tours, noting that the technology had been used for other Hatsune Miku events. (Note: MikuPa Tokyo '11 had a screen instead of the expected hologram, which has caused a backlash among Japanese fans causing 5pb to publicly make an apology on Twitter.) During the Europe tour, the London performance at Wembley Arena broke record as the most-attended Miku Expo concert with over 8,000 attendees.

In July 2025, it was announced that Miku Expo 2025 would tour Asia, scheduled from November 5 to 29. This marks the first ever Asia tour. On August 19, an additional city and show were announced. Taipei received a show and Seoul received another show on the next day.

Miku Expo 2026 was announced in October 2025, with a tour for North America scheduled from April 13 to May 19, 2026. On October 28, select cities received one additional show. Chicago received a show on April 12, San Jose received a show on April 23, and Boston received a show on May 11. On November 4, Los Angeles received an additional show on April 26.

Miku Expo 2026 Europe was announced on February 20, 2026, scheduled to tour six European countries from November 12 to 25. On April 7, an additional show was scheduled for Madrid on November 24, while Lisbon received its first show scheduled on November 27.

== Tour dates ==
List of shows, showing date, city, country and venue
Date	City	Country	Venue	Ref.
2014
May 28	Jakarta	Indonesia	Jakarta Convention Center	
May 29	Jakarta	Indonesia	Jakarta Convention Center	
October 11	Los Angeles	United States	Nokia Theatre	
October 12	Los Angeles	United States	Nokia Theatre	
October 17	New York City	United States	Hammerstein Ballroom	
October 18	New York City	United States	Hammerstein Ballroom	
2015
June 27	Shanghai	China	Shanghai Fengyun E-Sports Arena	
June 28	Shanghai	China	Shanghai Fengyun E-Sports Arena	
2016
March 23	Fukuoka	Japan	Zepp Fukuoka	
March 24	Fukuoka	Japan	Zepp Fukuoka	
March 29	Osaka	Japan	Zepp Namba	
March 31	Nagoya	Japan	Zepp Nagoya	
April 5	Sapporo	Japan	Zepp Sapporo	
April 9	Tokyo	Japan	Zepp Tokyo	
April 10	Tokyo	Japan	Zepp Tokyo	
April 23	Seattle	United States	WaMu Theater	
April 30	San Francisco	United States	The Warfield	
May 6	Los Angeles	United States	Microsoft Theater	
May 14	Dallas	United States	The Bomb Factory	
May 17	Houston	United States	NRG Arena	
May 20	Toronto	Canada	Sony Centre for the Performing Arts	
May 25	Chicago	United States	Chicago Theatre	
May 28	New York City	United States	Hammerstein Ballroom	
June 1	Monterrey	Mexico	Auditorio Banamex	
June 4	Mexico City	Mexico	El Plaza Condesa	
June 5	Mexico City	Mexico	El Plaza Condesa	
June 25	New Taipei City	Taiwan	New Taipei City Exhibition Hall	
June 26	New Taipei City	Taiwan	New Taipei City Exhibition Hall	
December 3	Shanghai	China	Happy Valley Shanghai	
December 4	Shanghai	China	Happy Valley Shanghai	
December 10	Beijing	China	Beijing Exhibition Center	
December 11	Beijing	China	Beijing Exhibition Center	
2017
December 16	Kuala Lumpur	Malaysia	Axiata Arena	
2018
June 29	Los Angeles	United States	Microsoft Theater	
July 1	San Jose	United States	City National Civic	
July 6	Dallas	United States	The Bomb Factory	
July 8	Cedar Park (Note: Labeled as Austin in promotional material.)	United States	H-E-B Center at Cedar Park	
July 12	Washington, D.C.	United States	The Anthem	
July 14	New York City	United States	Hammerstein Ballroom	
July 19	Mexico City	Mexico	Pepsi Center WTC	
December 1	Paris	France	La Seine Musicale	
December 4	Cologne	Germany	Lanxess Arena	
December 8	London	United Kingdom	Olympia London	
2019
May 11	New Taipei City	Taiwan	New Taipei City Exhibition Hall	
July 27	Hong Kong	China	Star Hall	
2020
January 11	London	United Kingdom	Brixton Academy	
January 16	Paris	France	Zénith Paris	
January 20	Berlin	Germany	Verti Music Hall	
January 24	Amsterdam	Netherlands	Ziggo Dome	
January 28	Barcelona	Spain	Sant Jordi Club	
2024
April 4	Vancouver	Canada	Thunderbird Sports Centre	
April 6	Portland	United States	Keller Auditorium	
April 8	San Jose	United States	San Jose Civic	
April 9	San Jose	United States	San Jose Civic	
April 14	Tempe (Note: Labeled as Phoenix in promotional material.)	United States	Mullett Arena	
April 15	Tempe	United States	Mullett Arena	
April 17	Los Angeles	United States	Shrine Auditorium	
April 21	Denver	United States	Mission Ballroom	
April 22	Denver	United States	Mission Ballroom	
April 24	Dallas	United States	The Factory in Deep Ellum	
April 25	Dallas	United States	The Factory in Deep Ellum	
April 27	Cedar Park	United States	H-E-B Center at Cedar Park	
April 30	College Park (Note: Labeled as Atlanta in promotional material.)	United States	Gateway Center Arena	
May 2	Orlando	United States	Walt Disney Theater	
May 5	Washington, D.C.	United States	The Anthem	
May 7	Newark	United States	Prudential Center	
May 9	Boston	United States	Wang Theatre	
May 12	Detroit	United States	Fisher Theatre	
May 14	Chicago	United States	Auditorium Theatre	
May 16	Toronto	Canada	Coca-Cola Coliseum	
May 21	Mexico City	Mexico	Pepsi Center WTC	
October 26	London	United Kingdom	Wembley Arena	
October 28	Brussels	Belgium	ING Arena	
October 29	Paris	France	Zénith Paris	
October 30	Amsterdam	Netherlands	AFAS Live	
November 1	Düsseldorf	Germany	Mitsubishi Electric Halle	
November 2	Berlin	Germany	Uber Eats Music Hall	
November 15	Auckland	New Zealand	Spark Arena	
November 18	Brisbane	Australia	Brisbane Convention & Exhibition Centre	
November 20	Sydney	Australia	ICC Sydney Theatre	
November 22	Melbourne	Australia	John Cain Arena	
November 26	Perth	Australia	Perth Arena	
2025
November 5	Bangkok	Thailand	UOB LIVE	
November 8	Hong Kong	China	AsiaWorld-Arena	
November 12	Jakarta	Indonesia	Tennis Indoor Senayan	
November 16	Manila	Philippines	SM Mall of Asia Arena	
November 19	Singapore	Singapore	The Star Theatre	
November 22	Kuala Lumpur	Malaysia	Idea Live KL	
November 26	Taipei	Taiwan	Taipei Arena	
November 29	Seoul	South Korea	Hwajeong Gymnasium	
November 30	Seoul	South Korea	Hwajeong Gymnasium	
2026
April 12	Chicago	United States	The Auditorium Theatre	
April 13	Chicago	United States	The Auditorium Theatre	
April 15	Denver	United States	Mission Ballroom	
April 18	Vancouver	Canada	Doug Mitchell Thunderbird Sports Centre	
April 20	Seattle	United States	WaMu Theater	
April 22	San Jose	United States	San Jose Civic	
April 23	San Jose	United States	San Jose Civic	
April 25	Los Angeles	United States	Peacock Theater	
April 26	Los Angeles	United States	Peacock Theater	
April 28	Glendale	United States	Desert Diamond Arena	
April 30	Grand Prairie	United States	Texas Trust CU Theatre	
May 1	Cedar Park	United States	H-E-B Center at Cedar Park	
May 3	Duluth	United States	Gas South Arena	
May 5	Washington	United States	The Anthem	
May 7	Newark	United States	Prudential Center	
May 10	Boston	United States	Wang Theatre At The Boch Center	
May 11	Boston	United States	Wang Theatre At The Boch Center	
May 13	Hamilton	Canada	TD Coliseum	
May 19	Mexico City	Mexico	Pepsi Center WTC	
November 12	London	United Kingdom	The O2 Arena	
November 14	Brussels	Belgium	ING Arena	
November 15	Amsterdam	Netherlands	AFAS Live	
November 17	Berlin	Germany	Velodrom	
November 20	Düsseldorf	Germany	PSD Bank Dome	
November 22	Paris	France	Accor Arena	
November 24	Madrid	Spain	Palacio Vistalegre	
November 25	Madrid	Spain	Palacio Vistalegre	
November 27	Lisbon	Portugal	Sagres Campo Pequeno	

=== Cancelled shows ===
List of cancelled shows, showing original and rescheduled dates, city, country, venue and reason for cancellation
Original date (2020)	First rescheduling (2020)	Second rescheduling (2021)	City	Country	Venue	Reason
2020–2021
April 26	September 4	April through May	Orlando	United States	Dr. Phillips Center for the Performing Arts	COVID-19 pandemic
April 29	September 8	April through May	National Harbor (Note: Labeled as Washington, D.C. in promotional material.)	United States	MGM National Harbor	COVID-19 pandemic
May 2	September 11	April through May	Asbury Park	United States	Asbury Park Convention Hall	COVID-19 pandemic
May 5	September 17	April through May	Boston	United States	House of Blues	COVID-19 pandemic
May 15	September 20	April through May	Laval (Note: Labeled as Montreal in promotional material.)	Canada	Place Bell	COVID-19 pandemic
May 13	September 23	April through May	Toronto	Canada	Coca-Cola Coliseum	COVID-19 pandemic
May 9	September 25	April through May	Chicago	United States	Aragon Ballroom	COVID-19 pandemic
April 4	September 30	April through May	Vancouver	Canada	Thunderbird Sports Centre	COVID-19 pandemic
April 14	October 4	April through May	San Jose	United States	San Jose Civic	COVID-19 pandemic
April 8	October 18	April through May	Los Angeles	United States	Shrine Auditorium	COVID-19 pandemic
April 21	October 21	April through May	Dallas	United States	The Bomb Factory	COVID-19 pandemic
April 24	October 24	April through May	College Park	United States	Gateway Center Arena	COVID-19 pandemic

== Notes ==
Cities

Others

== Works cited ==
- Lam, Ka Yan (October 2016). "The Hatsune Miku Phenomenon: More Than a Virtual J‐Pop Diva". The Journal of Popular Culture. 49 (5). doi:10.1111/jpcu.12455.
- Anderson, Natasha (October 11, 2021). "Hatsune Miku, Virtual Idols, and Transforming the Popular Music Experience". Musicology.ECA (2). Edinburgh College of Art. doi:10.2218/music.2021.6478. ISSN 2752-7069.
