= Hatsune Miku: Unofficial Hatsune Mix =

Japanese manga

- Cover of volume 1

メーカー非公式 初音みっくす (Mēkā Hikōshiki Hatsune Mikkusu)
- Manga
- Written by: Kei
- Published by: Jive
- English publisher: NA: Dark Horse Comics
- Magazine: Comic Rush
- Original run: January 2008 – December 2010
- Volumes: 3

Hatsune Miku: Unofficial Hatsune Mix (メーカー非公式 初音みっくす, Mēkā Hikōshiki Hatsune Mikkusu) is a Japanese manga written and illustrated by Kei, the original artist of Vocaloid 2 Hatsune Miku. The manga was originally based on Miku, but came to feature other Vocaloid 1 and 2 characters as the series progressed. The manga was serialized in Jive's shōnen manga magazine Comic Rush between the January 2008 and December 2010 issues. However, the characters and settings depicted in this manga are not official. It is licensed for distribution in North America by Dark Horse Comics, who released the entire series in one volume in 2014.

== Plot ==
Each chapter in Hatsune Miku: Unofficial Hatsune Mix is a self contained story and there is often little to connect two chapters together. Despite this, they still form a rough chronological order, taking into account the first appearances of the different characters. The series is set in Sapporo, Japan as that is the location of Crypton Future Media, the developers of Hatsune Miku and related software. The characters share personality traits that were influenced by the Vocaloid fan community. Items and food associated with the Vocaloids are also depicted. Kasane Teto also makes several guest appearances within the series.

== Characters ==
- Hatsune Miku (初音 ミク)
- Kagamine Rin (鏡音 リン)
- Kagamine Len (鏡音 レン, Kagamine Ren)
- Megurine Luka (巡音 ルカ, Megurine Ruka)
- Meiko, known as Onee-san (お姉さん, big sister)
- Kaito, known as Onii-san (お兄さん, big brother)
- Gackpoid (がくっぽいど, Gakuppoido) (guest appearance)

The characters who appear in the manga are used differently in every storyline and their personalities are subject to change. For example, in "Mermaid Mix", Miku appears as a mermaid trying to win the affection of a Prince (Kaito) was kidnapped by a temptress (Meiko).

== Manga ==
The manga was serialized in Jive's shōnen manga magazine Comic Rush between the January 2008 and December 2010 issues. Three tankōbon volumes were released in Japan between December 7, 2008, and November 6, 2010. Dark Horse Comics licensed the manga for distribution in North America.

No.	Release date	ISBN
01	December 7, 2008	978-4-8617-6589-6
01 "Giant Mix" (2nd Song in Comic Rush); 02 "Chocolate Mix" (3rd Song); 03 "Teacher Mix" (4th Song); 04 "Sakura Mix" (5th Song); 05 "Wandering Mix" (6th Song); 06 "Work Mix" (7th Song); 07 "Future Mix" (8th Song); 08 "Mermaid Mix" (9th Song); 09 "Chibi Mix" (10th Song)
02	November 7, 2009	978-4-8617-6727-2
10 "Snow Mix" (13th Song); 11 "Painful Mix" (11th Song); 12 "Kagamine Mix" (14th Song); 13 "Celeb Mix" (12th Song); 14 "Love Mix" (15th Song); 15 "Graduation Mix" (16th Song); 16 "Luka Mix" (17th Song); 17 "Ring Mix" (18th Song); 18 "Megurine Mix" (19th Song); 19 "Plum rain Mix" (20th Song)
03	November 6, 2010	978-4-8617-6799-9
20 "Hina Mix" (26th Song); 21 "Matsuri Mix" (21st Song); 22 "Sports day Mix" (22nd Song); 23 "Santa Claus Mix" (24th Song); 24 "Sibyl Mix" (25th Song); 25 "Pygmy Mix" (29th Song); 26 "Magical Mix" (31st Song); 27 "Scolded Mix" (28th Song); 28 "Tricked Mix" (32nd Song); 29 "Module Mix" (23rd Song); 30 "Costumes Mix" (27th Song); 31 "Duet Mix" (30.5th Song)

== Notes and references ==
- The chapter "Abandoned Mix" is not included in volume one, and the orders of chapters in volume two and three are different from that in Comic Rush.
