= Colorful Stage! The Movie: A Miku Who Can't Sing =

2025 Japanese animated film by Hiroyuki Hata

- Theatrical release poster
- Japanese: 劇場版プロジェクトセカイ 壊れたセカイと歌えないミク
- Revised Hepburn: Gekijōban Purojekuto Sekai Kowareta Sekai to Utaenai Miku
- Directed by: Hiroyuki Hata
- Written by: Yoko Yonaiyama
- Based on: Hatsune Miku: Colorful Stage! by Colorful Palette and Sega
- Starring: Hatsune Miku (Note: Original voice by Saki Fujita); Ruriko Noguchi; Yui Ogura; Akina; Daisuke Hirose; Tomori Kusunoki
- Edited by: Ayumu Takahashi
- Music by: Satoshi Hōno
- Production company: P.A. Works
- Distributed by: Shochiku
- Release date: January 17, 2025 (Japan)
- Running time: 110 minutes
- Country: Japan
- Language: Japanese
- Box office: $12.2 million

Colorful Stage! The Movie: A Miku Who Can't Sing (Note: Japanese: 劇場版プロジェクトセカイ 壊れたセカイと歌えないミク, Hepburn: Gekijōban Purojekuto Sekai Kowareta Sekai to Utaenai Miku; lit. 'Project Sekai the Movie: Broken Sekai and Miku Who Can't Sing') is a 2025 Japanese animated musical drama film based on the mobile game Hatsune Miku: Colorful Stage! developed by Colorful Palette and published by Sega. Produced by P.A. Works and distributed by Shochiku, the film is directed by Hiroyuki Hata and written by Yoko Yonaiyama. It is the first feature film based on the Vocaloid character Hatsune Miku.

The film debuted in Japanese theaters on January 17, 2025. GKIDS licensed the film for an official English release and released it in North American cinemas on April 17, 2025.

== Plot ==
In Shibuya, five musical bands of teenagers (Leo/need, More More Jump!, Vivid Bad Squad, Wonderlands x Showtime, and Nightcord at 25:00) go about their lives while producing music. They do so with the support of alternate themed versions of Virtual Singers Hatsune Miku, Kagamine Rin & Len, Megurine Luka, Meiko, and Kaito, who reside in Sekai, virtual dimensions made from the group members' emotions, which they travel to using their phones or computers.

Meanwhile, a previously unseen version of Hatsune Miku (Note: Identified off-screen and in Hatsune Miku: Colorful Stage as the Miku of the Window Sekai (窓のセカイ, Mado no Sekai)) is traveling between screens in Japan, looking for help. Originating from a gloomy and unwelcoming Sekai, the people whose feelings that gave rise to it experience depression and consider abandoning their creative ambitions, believing they are unable to achieve them. Consequently, this version of Miku is despondent and lonely, and discouraged whenever trying to connect emotionally through a song to the people whose feelings make up her Sekai, to no avail. Said Miku seeks the help of the members of all five bands, who each help her refine her song and gain confidence in herself. Reinvigorated, she once again attempts to reach out in song to the people whose feelings formed her Sekai, but is again met with failure.

As the individuals that formed her Sekai fall further into depression, the lonely Miku begins to fall into despair, so she transports the five groups into her Sekai. Inside, they witness scenes of each of the people whose feelings created it struggling in their daily life and unsuccessfully attempt to persuade Miku to not give up. Miku tearfully thanks them for their efforts and sends them away, and her lonely Sekai is swallowed in an ocean of darkness, which also permeates the other five Sekai to abduct each of the groups' versions of Hatsune Miku. The Sekais' collapse causes an unusual blackout throughout Japan, and the groups subsequently discover that all traces of Miku's voice in songs and elsewhere have disappeared from the real world.

The bands each realize the connection between the depressed people in reality and the Sekai, and come to the conclusion that the only way to save the lonely Miku and restore their own Mikus to existence is to cheer up the people whose feelings formed the lonely Sekai. In order to do this, they resolve to create and publicly perform new songs about hope, hoping it will reach the people and ameliorate their depression, dispersing the ocean of darkness subsiding from the lonely Miku's Sekai as more people start listening to them, restoring the other Sekai's Mikus. Now empowered with renewed hope, Miku reappears and performs her song, "Hello, Sekai" (ハローセカイ), for all of Shibuya, and this time successfully connects emotionally with the populace.

After the performance, the now optimistic Miku teleports the groups to her Sekai, now bright and filled with hope, thanking them for helping her complete her song. The bands bid her farewell and return to their normal lives. Later, one of the people whose feelings created the new Miku's Sekai visits her. She greets them, having awaited their arrival.

== Production ==
The film was announced on July 29, 2024. The film is produced by P.A. Works and directed by Hiroyuki Hata, with Yoko Yonaiyama writing the script, Yuki Akiyama designing the characters, and Satoshi Hōno composing the music. The cast members from the smartphone game Hatsune Miku: Colorful Stage! reprise their roles.

=== Release ===
The film is distributed by Shochiku and opened in Japan on January 17, 2025. It was initially stated to be released in US theaters by GKIDS on April 11, but was later delayed to April 17, 2025. GKIDS also released the film in Canada on May 11. Madness Entertainment licensed the film for theatrical distribution in Mexico, where it was released on March 13. Cinecolor licensed the film for theatrical distribution in Chile, where it was released on April 24. Commemorative postcards containing special serial codes which unlocked content within the mobile game were given away at Japanese theaters to those who attended screenings of the film. The commemorative postcard giveaways also took place at theaters showing the film in the United States, Mexico and Chile. The film was distributed in 800 North American theaters.

In Asia, Medialink acquired the film, releasing it in Taiwan on March 28, Hong Kong and Macau on April 3, Thailand on April 10, Malaysia and Singapore on April 17, the Philippines on April 19, Indonesia on May 9, Vietnam on June 13, and China on October 25. PVR Inox Pictures acquired and released the film in India on August 29.

In Australia and New Zealand, the film was acquired by Sugoi Co and released for a limited time on May 1, 2025. A special premiere screening was held in Sydney at Event Cinemas George Street on April 28.

In the United Kingdom, the film was announced to be released in the Summer after it was publicly announced that Anime Limited had acquired the rights on May 23. As of Monday July 7, 2025, the film was announced to be released in UK and Irish cinemas on August 31, 2025.

On December 16, 2025, the film was released digitally.

On April 14, 2026, GKIDS released a collector's edition Blu-ray of the film. A standard edition Blu-ray was later released on June 16.

=== Songs ===
The theme song by 40mp and sasakure.UK titled "Hajimari no Mirai" (はじまりの未来; 'The Future of Beginning') features vocal by Hatsune Miku, and the ending song by Jin titled "Worlders" with an arrangement by TeddyLoid is performed by all 26 characters. The film also featured six new songs that are written and composed by Deco*27, with each song arranged by six different Vocaloid producers:

Title (Note: Information is taken from the official X account of the film.)	Arrangement	Vocal
"Hello, Sekai" (ハローセカイ)	tepe	Hatsune Miku
"SToRY"	Shota Horie (kemu)	Leo/need
"Fun!!"	Iyowa	More More Jump!
"Fire Dance" (ファイアダンス)	Giga	Vivid Bad Squad
"Smile*Symphony" (スマイル*シンフォニー)	Nilfruits	Wonderlands x Showtime
"Soko ni Aru, Hikari." (そこに在る、光。; 'The Light That Dwells Here')	Surii	Nightcord at 25:00

The film also featured previously released songs with new arrangement. A new insert song titled "Kimikoi Quest" (君恋クエスト) composed by irucaice and Ichinose LUPO, and arranged by, in addition to the composers, Tanchiky. Some Vocaloid songs also made a cameo in the film. (Note: While some songs are played, some appeared as CD jacket, advertisement board, or simply being referenced.)

== Reception ==
=== Box office ===
In its first weekend, Colorful Stage! The Movie: A Miku Who Can't Sing made roughly 307 million yen at the Japanese box office and finished in second place behind Mobile Suit Gundam GQuuuuuuX Beginning. The film came in first in terms of its screen average (box office revenue per screen) that weekend. As of February 23, 2025, box office revenue has exceeded 1.03 billion yen (equivalent to US$7,216,471).

In the United States (reported by BoxOfficeMojo), this film earned an estimated US$3,338,141 and ranked #7 at the U.S. box office in its weekend limited screening, with an estimated US$1,424,687 on Friday (including Thursday previews), an estimated US$793,017 on Saturday and an estimated US$605,431 on Sunday. The screening continued, making the film gross US$3,020,824 in its first week. In its second week, the film earned an estimated US$302,184, and an estimated US$15,133 in its third week. In Mexico, it reached #6, with an estimated revenue of $381,232. In China, it debuted in second place with $2.8 million.

=== Critical response ===
Richard Eisenbeis of Anime News Network noted that while the film was packed with "great animation, superb music, and a straightforward, thematically poignant plot", it did not properly introduce any of its characters, making it difficult for viewers to juggle "more than 20 new characters while trying to figure out the rules of the world on the fly", if the viewer did not play or was not at least familiar with the original game.

Petrana Radulovic of Polygon also echoed these concerns of the movie being confusing for those who were not already familiar with the game, but said that after taking time to research the characters and setting she was glad that she "took the time to do my homework with this one". Radulovic noted that it was difficult for her to keep track of the cast, saying that it was "so much to keep track of", and that "The character designs are admittedly all distinct and fun, but when a given character is only on screen for a few minutes at a time before the story jumps to the next group and then the next, the brightly colored hair and big eyes all blur together." Despite these issues, she called the movie "particularly special", appreciating its themes of "how music connects all different sorts of people, and how different musical stylings can convey the same message."

Writing for The Guardian, Phil Hoad reviewed the film negatively. He said that the film's plot was "particularly incomprehensible", complaining that the characters are given no development and that the stakes are poorly defined. He said the film was "garbled", "chronically online", and "like The Matrix if Neo had huffed a nitrous oxide canister before having every edition of Pop Idol downloaded into his cranium".
