= Magical Mirai =

Yearly event in Japan

Magical Mirai (Japanese: マジカルミライ) is a yearly combined event hosted by Crypton Future Media and TOKYO MX centered around the Piapro Characters Hatsune Miku, Megurine Luka, Kagamine Rin/Len, MEIKO, and KAITO, it's an exhibition and live concert and is held annually since 2013 and it has a different theme each year. The event is held around the summertime in major cities in Japan.

== Content ==
=== Live concert ===
The live concert features 3DCG performances by Hatsune Miku and other virtual singers, which include notable Vocaloid songs and digital choreography of Miku dancing, projected onto transparent screens. The performers typically include the 6 Piapro Characters.

The concerts are accompanied by a live backing band, with musicians performing instruments such as guitar, bass, drums, and keyboard. The setlist consists of songs by various Vocaloid producers, including both established and newer works, as well as the event's annual theme song.

=== Exhibition ===
The exhibition features works by creators associated with Hatsune Miku and the Piapro Characters, alongside displays of artwork and booths from participating companies and organizations. Official merchandise is also sold at the exhibition, including event-exclusive clothing, accessories, character goods, and other products featuring the event's annual visual designs.

The exhibition also includes interactive activities that allow visitors to participate in creative experiences and engage with other fans and creators including workshops, stage events, and other programs related to the Piapro Characters and Vocaloid culture. The exhibition has also hosted the Creator's Market, a music sales event presented by KARENT that allows participating Vocaloid creators to sell their music directly to visitors featuring music creators and labels across multiple booths.

== History ==
=== 2010s ===
Hatsune Miku "Magical Mirai 2013"

The first Magical Mirai was held on August 30, 2013, at Yokohama Arena in Yokohama, Japan. The event was divided into three areas: the Maji Area, which hosted the live concert; the Karu Area, which featured exhibitions and workshops centered on Hatsune Miku's creative culture; and the Mirai Area, which included corporate booths, collaborations, and merchandise. The main visual was created by illustrator CHRIS, with additional key visuals contributed by KEI and iXima.

Hatsune Miku "Magical Mirai 2014"

The 2014 Magical Mirai was held at Tokyo Metropolitan Gymnasium in Tokyo on September 20, 2014, and INTEX Osaka in Osaka on August 30, 2014. Osaka featured a special exhibition area in addition to the usual concerts. Its official theme song was "Next Nest" by Satsuki ga Tenkomori and the main visual was illustrated by MONQ, depicting Hatsune Miku alongside the event's cube motif, representing the six Piapro Characters and the expansion of their creative culture, while incorporating the themes of "VIVID," "MUSIC," and "FUTURE".

Hatsune Miku "Magical Mirai 2015"

The 2015 Magical Mirai was held in Tokyo from September 4–6, 2015, with concerts at Nippon Budokan for two days and an exhibition at the Science Museum for three days. The theme was "CUBE," with "Hand in Hand" by livetune as its theme song. The main visual was illustrated by hoshima, based on a costume design by shikimi, and centered on the concept of the "chain of creation".

Hatsune Miku "Magical Mirai 2016"

The 2016 Magical Mirai was held at Makuhari Messe in Chiba from September 9–11, 2016, with the exhibition taking place in Halls 10–11 and the live concerts in Hall 9. The event's theme focused on Hatsune Miku's music and the creative culture surrounding her, with "39 Music!" by mikitoP. The main visual and costume design were created by illustrator LENA[A-7], depicting Miku in a futuristic and colorful outfit.

Hatsune Miku "Magical Mirai 2017"

The 2017 Magical Mirai was held at Makuhari Messe in Chiba from September 1–3, 2017, with the live concerts in Hall 3 and the exhibition in Halls 1–2. The event marked the fifth anniversary of Magical Mirai and the 10th anniversary of Hatsune Miku, with "Dune" by Hachi serving as its theme song. The main visual was illustrated by iXima, who also designed the costume, with an idol-inspired design created to commemorate the two anniversaries.

Hatsune Miku "Magical Mirai 2018"

The 2018 Magical Mirai was held at INTEX Osaka in Osaka on August 25–26, 2018, and Makuhari Messe in Chiba from August 31–September 2, 2018, marking the event's return to Osaka for the first time since 2014. The exhibitions additionally featured a Kagamine Rin & Len 10th Anniversary exhibition alongside the usual contents. The event's theme centered on experiencing and celebrating the creative culture surrounding Hatsune Miku, with "Greenlights Serenade" by Omoi serving as the main theme song. The main visual was designed and illustrated by Mika Pikazo, depicting Hatsune Miku in a colorful futuristic outfit with a megaphone motif.

Hatsune Miku "Magical Mirai 2019"

The 2019 Magical Mirai was held at INTEX Osaka in Osaka from August 9–11, 2019, and Makuhari Messe in Chiba from August 30–September 1, 2019, with exhibitions taking place in Halls 4 and 5B in Osaka and Halls 1–2 in Tokyo, alongside live concerts. The exhibitions additionally featured a Megurine Luka 10th Anniversary exhibition as well. The event's theme was "Future Circus," with "Bless Your Breath" by WADATAKEAKI serving as the theme song. The main visual and costume design were created by illustrator ni02, depicting Hatsune Miku and the other virtual singers in colorful circus-inspired outfits with a futuristic aesthetic.

=== 2020s ===
Hatsune Miku "Magical Mirai 2020"

The 2020 Magical Mirai was held at INTEX Osaka in Osaka from November 27–29, 2020, and Makuhari Messe in Chiba from December 18–20, 2020, after the Osaka event was postponed from its originally scheduled August dates due to the COVID-19 pandemic. The exhibitions additionally featured a MEIKO 15th Anniversary exhibition as well. The event's common theme was "MATSURI (Festival)," with Osaka presented as a "Summer Festival" and Tokyo as a "Winter Festival," The theme song was "Because You're Here" by PinocchioP, while the main visual and costume design were created by illustrator fujichoco, depicting Hatsune Miku in a colorful festival-inspired design.

Hatsune Miku "Magical Mirai 2021"

The 2021 Magical Mirai was held at INTEX Osaka in Osaka from October 22–24, 2021, and Makuhari Messe in Chiba from November 5–7, 2021. The event's theme was "Fairy Tale Fantasy," with special programming also celebrating the 15th anniversary of KAITO. The theme song was "Hatsune Creation Myth" by cosMo@Bousou-P, while the main visual and costume design were created by illustrator left, depicting Hatsune Miku in a fairy-tale-inspired fantasy design.

Hatsune Miku "Magical Mirai" 10th Anniversary

The 2022 Magical Mirai, celebrating its 10th anniversary, was held at INTEX Osaka in Osaka from August 12–14, 2022, and Makuhari Messe in Chiba from September 2–4, 2022. The 10th-anniversary edition also expanded the event to Sapporo, where a live concert was held at Sapporo Cultural Arts Theater hitaru on February 4–5, 2023. The exhibitions additionally featured historical displays documenting the event's previous editions The theme was "Retro Future," with "Future Eve" by sasakure.UK serving as the theme song. The main visual was illustrated by KEI, with the costume designed by NOCO, depicting Hatsune Miku in a colorful, space-themed retro-futuristic outfit.

Hatsune Miku "Magical Mirai 2023"

The 2023 Magical Mirai was held at INTEX Osaka in Osaka from August 11–13, 2023, and Makuhari Messe in Chiba from September 1–3, 2023. The event's theme was "Hero," focusing on the idea of Hatsune Miku and creators as heroes, with "HERO" by Ayase serving as the theme song. The main visual and costume design were created by illustrator LAM, depicting Hatsune Miku in a distinctive hero-inspired outfit incorporating red accents and futuristic elements.

Hatsune Miku "Magical Mirai 2024"

The 2024 Magical Mirai was held at Fukuoka Sunpalace and the Fukuoka Convention Center in Fukuoka from August 17–18, 2024, Makuhari Messe in Chiba from August 30–September 1, and INTEX Osaka in Osaka from October 12–14, 2024, making Fukuoka a new host city for the event. The event's theme was "FAN FUN TRIP," inviting attendees to embark on a creative journey together, with "Antenna 39" by Hiiragi Magnetite serving as the theme song. The main visual was illustrated by tama, depicting Hatsune Miku in a colorful travel-inspired design.

Hatsune Miku "Magical Mirai 2025"

The 2025 Magical Mirai was held at Sendai Sunplaza in Sendai from August 1–3, 2025, INTEX Osaka in Osaka from August 9–11, and Makuhari Messe in Chiba from August 29–31, 2025, marking the event's first appearance in Sendai. The event's theme was "Starry River in the Sky," with *"Lustrous" by *Luna serving as the theme song. The main visual was created by illustrator Tiv, depicting Hatsune Miku in a starry, celestial-themed design.

Hatsune Miku "Magical Mirai 2026"

The 2026 Magical Mirai was held at Act City Hamamatsu in Hamamatsu from July 24–26, 2026, INTEX Osaka in Osaka from August 14–16, and Makuhari Messe in Chiba from August 28–30, 2026, marking the event's first appearance in Hamamatsu. The event's theme was "Sonare of the Lake," inspired by the lake and musical culture of Hamamatsu, with "Sora ni Menjite" by Tota Kasamura serving as the theme song. The main visual was illustrated by wata, depicting Hatsune Miku in a lake- and music-inspired design.
