= Piko (singer) =

Japanese pop singer

- Born: March 11, 1988 (age 38); Himeji, Hyōgo Prefecture, Japan
- Origin: Himeji, Hyōgo Prefecture, Japan
- Genres: J-pop; pop rock; electropop; folk-pop
- Occupation: Singer
- Years active: 2009–present
- Labels: Heart Full Entertainment (2009); Ki/oon Music (2010–2016); GiM Entertainment (2017–present)
- Website: ch.nicovideo.jp/pikoch/blomaga

Piko (ピコ, Piko; born March 11, 1988) is a male Japanese pop singer signed to the Sony Music Entertainment sub-label Ki/oon Music. He became popular on the Internet through the video sharing network Nico Nico Douga. His fans call him "Ryouseirui" (両声類; lit. "both-voice types"), a fan-made word to describe his wide vocal range that includes notes typical of both male and female voice types.

His kaomoji is "ﾋﾟωﾟｺ". As a Vocaloid producer, he uses the name Chuutoro-P.

== Biography ==
Piko began music as the vocalist of a band during his second year of high school, and continued activities in the music department of his college.

In 2007, while browsing the music cover section of popular internet video-sharing site Nico Nico Douga, Piko's mother encouraged him to upload his own covers and he became widely popular on this site. His Nico Nico username and stage name comes from the name of a pet dog he has.

He is good friends with another Ryouseirui on Nico Nico Douga called Sekihan. They formed a group called Akapiko Hammer (赤ピコ飯まー☆) and often make songs comedic.

His kaomoji is also his logo and the design for his hand puppet, a mouse which has been affectionately called "Pikochu". However, many people misunderstand it as a cat.

On July 22, 2009, he released his first physical single, "Thanatos" feat. Tissue Hime and later made his major debut with Ki/oon Records at a concert at Shibuya-AX on March 27, 2010. Piko's major debut single "Story" was released October 13, 2010. Then, he concentrated on performing many songs of anime. His second major single, "Wasurenagusa", was released in December 2010 and was used as the Ending theme for the anime Tegami Bachi Reverse. On March 9, 2011, his 4th major single, "Sakurane" was chosen as an ending theme for the anime Gintama. On August 15, 2012, his 7th major single "Make My Day" which was used as the opening track for the anime Binbougami ga!. On June 5, 2013, his 8th major single "Kotonoha", produced by Samfree was used as the ending theme for the anime Katanagatari (Noitamina version).

Piko's first album after debut, 1PIKO, was released on May 11, 2011, and his second album, 2PIKO, was released on May 30, 2012. His cover album, Hitokoe -42701340-, an album of vocaloid songs, was released on February 20, 2013. His first Best Collection Album, PIKOllection Best+4 was released on February 20, 2013. His third album, Pathfinder, was released on May 1, 2019. His fourth album, 柩 -HITSUGI-, was released on March 8, 2023.

Piko provided the voice for Utatane Piko, a Vocaloid library from Sony Music Distribution which uses the Vocaloid 2 engine. It was released on December 8, 2010.

== Discography ==
=== Singles ===
Released	Title
22 July 2009	Thanatos
13 October 2010	Story
8 December 2010	Wasurenagusa
9 March 2011	Sakurane
5 October 2011	Yume Hana
25 April 2012	Emiiro Refrain
15 August 2012	Make My Day!
5 June 2013	Kotonoha
30 September 2015	Murabito A
27 December 2017	Re:Act
31 August 2018	Hero
17 April 2019	Tokyo Shinobizaki (Enshii!! Rikoda-chan ending)
18 December 2021	Poltergeist
28 September 2022	Kurage no Yuurei

=== Albums ===
Released	Title
9 September 2009	INFINITY
11 May 2011	1PIKO
30 May 2012	2PIKO
20 February 2013	Hitokoe −42701340-
24 July 2013	PIKOllection Best+4
1 May 2019	Pathfinder
8 March 2023	柩 -HITSUGI-

=== DVD ===
Released	Title
21 December 2011	Piko LIVE TOUR 2011 〜1PIKO〜 "Piko no natsumatsuri"
