= Hatsune Miku =

Singing voice synthesizer software

- Software box art, 2007
- Developer: Crypton Future Media
- Release: August 31, 2007
- Stable release: Hatsune Miku V6 / April 14, 2026
- Operating system: Microsoft Windows, macOS
- Platform: PC
- Available in: Japanese; English; Chinese
- Type: Vocal synthesizer application
- License: Proprietary (Vocaloid voice/software); Creative Commons BY-NC (character design)
- Website: ec.crypton.co.jp/pages/prod/vocaloid/cv01_us

Hatsune Miku (Japanese: 初音ミク, [hatsɯ̥ne miꜜkɯ]), officially code-named CV01, is a Vocaloid voicebank and software application developed by Crypton Future Media. Her voice is generated using vocal sound samples provided by Japanese voice actress Saki Fujita. The software is personified by an official mascot character depicted as a 16-year-old girl with turquoise twintails. Marketed as a virtual idol, Miku has performed at live virtual concerts as an animated projection.

Released in August 2007, Hatsune Miku was the second product built on Yamaha Corporation's Vocaloid 2 engine and the first Japanese voicebank for the platform. Subsequent updates have expanded her functionality across Vocaloid 3, Vocaloid 4, and Vocaloid 6 technology, alongside Crypton's proprietary Piapro Studio editor.

The name of the character comes from merging the Japanese words for first (初, hatsu), sound (音, ne), and future (ミク, miku), (Note: Miku is a nanori reading of the word for "future" (未来), which is normally read using the on'yomi readings of its characters as mirai. These are the same characters used in Miku's Chinese name (Simplified Chinese: 初音未来; traditional Chinese: 初音未來; pinyin: Chūyīn Wèilái).) thus meaning "the first sound of the future", which, along with her code name, refers to her position as the first of Crypton's "Character Vocal Series" (abbreviated "CV Series"), preceding Kagamine Rin/Len (code-named CV02) and Megurine Luka (code-named CV03). The number 01 can be seen on her left shoulder in official artwork.

== Development ==
Hatsune Miku's voice
Hatsune Miku sings "Kimigayo" acapella

Hatsune Miku was the first Vocaloid developed by Crypton Future Media after they handled the release of the Yamaha vocal Meiko and Kaito. Miku was intended to be the first of a series of Vocaloids called the "Character Vocal Series" (abbreviated "CV Series"), which included Kagamine Rin/Len and Megurine Luka. Each had a particular concept and vocal direction.

During Miku's development, Crypton decided to create an illustrated persona to represent the voice. The software was initially targeted primarily at professional music producers, as a broader consumer market for vocal synthesizers had not yet emerged.

The task of coming up with Miku's image went to the manga artist Kei Garō, who was already known from doing art for various doujin artists. When Kei designed Miku, his only direction was her color scheme (based on Yamaha's synthesizer's signature turquoise color), and that she was an android. Various aspects of her clothing, such as the computer interface on her left sleeve, were based on Yamaha's synthesizers.

Miku's vocal samples were taken from voice actress Saki Fujita at a controlled pitch and tone. Those samples all contain a single Japanese phonic that, when strung together, creates full lyrics and phrases.

Hatsune Miku was first released on August 31, 2007, as the third commercially sold Vocaloid library. Crypton chose to market Miku as "an android diva in the near-future world where songs are lost." Hatsune Miku was released for Vocaloid 3 on August 31, 2013, including an English vocal library.

=== Additional software ===
On April 30, 2010, an add-on for Vocaloid 2 called Hatsune Miku Append was released. Consisting of six different timbres for the voice: Soft (gentle timbre), Sweet (young, chibi quality), Dark (mature and melancholic), Vivid (bright and cheerful), Solid (loud, clear voice), and Light (innocent and angelic). Miku Append was created to expand Miku's voice library, and as such requires the original program to be installed on the user's computer. This was the first time a Vocaloid had such a release, and more Append versions were reported from Crypton Future Media at later dates.

It was mentioned that a seventh Append voicebank, a falsetto voice, had been recorded; however, since the developers did not think it would be useful on its own, no plans were made for an independent release. Miku's English vocal was due for a Vocaloid 2 release, but it was not released in the engine due to low quality.

To aid in the production of 3D animations, the unofficial program MikuMikuDance was developed by independent programmer HiguchiM in 2008. The freeware software allowed a boom in fan-made animations to be developed, as well as being a boost for promoting Vocaloid songs themselves.

An English voicebank for Hatsune Miku was officially announced in 2013, following earlier development plans from 2010. The decision to move to Vocaloid 3 and lack of experience with English pronunciation delayed the release. It was finally released on August 31, 2013, as a digital distribution.

The Hatsune Miku Vocaloid 3 Japanese vocal library was released on September 26, 2013. It contained updates to all previous Vocaloid 2 vocals except Vivid and Light. These were later released separately, though they were initially offered to anyone who already owned Hatsune Miku, Hatsune Miku Append, and Hatsune Miku V3. Once imported into Vocaloid 4, all Hatsune Miku V3 vocals could use the new Cross-Synthesis system (XSY) built for the new engine of Vocaloid 3. The voice was imported into a device called Pocket Miku, released on April 3, 2014.

"エビチャーハン! (You’re Telling Me A SHRIMP Fried This Rice !)" by Jamie Paige, showcasing the V4 English iteration of Hatsune Miku.

Hatsune Miku received an update for Yamaha's Vocaloid 4 engine under the name of Hatsune Miku V4X. It makes use of the new EVEC system for Piapro Studio, a VSTi plugin used as an alternative to the traditional Vocaloid Editor. EVEC consists of recorded vowels. Along with the consonant, a different vocal tone can be achieved. Two vocal tones are included in the EVEC system: Power and Soft. Along with the new EVEC system, phoneme errors found in Miku's V2 and V3 voicebanks were resolved to improve vocal manipulation. Hatsune Miku V4X/V4 English was released on August 30, 2016.

A Mandarin Chinese voicebank was released in September 2017, making Hatsune Miku the first officially trilingual Vocaloid product. Her Chinese name is 初音未来; Chūyīn Wèilái; 未来 are the kanji characters for her given name, Miku.

At Magical Mirai 2019, head of Crypton Future Media's Character Development Wataru Sasaki announced that Hatsune Miku would be departing Yamaha's Vocaloid engine, and would not be utilizing Vocaloid 5 for any further development of their voice banks. It was established that the "identity" of the voices would remain the same, however. Then, on December 24, 2019, Sasaki announced that information about Hatsune Miku NT (Newtype) would be released. On the same day, Sonicwire announced that the release of Hatsune Miku NT was planned for summer 2020, and those who had registered for the software early would be able to access a prototype of the new engine, Piapro Studio NT. After delays, the Piapro Studio prototype was released on June 4, 2020. The full version of Piapro Studio and Hatsune Miku NT were released on November 27, 2020.

On August 1, 2024, Sonicwire posted that on August 30, 2024, they would be releasing the Piapro Characters Super Pack, a voicebank bundle that includes a Hatsune Miku variant for Vocaloid 4. In this post, it was also announced that Hatsune Miku V6 would be released, compatible with Vocaloid 6 and its AI voice synthesization tools. Hatsune Miku V6 was eventually released on April 14, 2026, after prolonged development delays, and included two voicebanks; Original and Soft, capable of singing in Japanese, English and Chinese. It was also announced that an updated version of Hatsune Miku NT was anticipated for the end of the year. Early access for Hatsune Miku NT V2 was released on October 23, 2024, before being officially launched on March 18, 2025.

== Marketing ==
Miku has been promoted since 2008 and was originally aimed at professional musicians. On September 12, 2007, Amazon.co.jp reported sales of Hatsune Miku totaling 57,500,000 yen, making the character the number-one-selling software of that time. She was the first Japanese vocal to be developed and distributed by Crypton Future Media. Following its launch, the software achieved notable commercial success in Japan, selling approximately 40,000 units by July 2008 and averaging 300 units a week. By January 2011, she had sold 60,000 units.

=== Merchandising ===
Following the commercial success of the initial software release, merchandising and brand licensing expanded significantly from 2008 onward. Miku's persona continues to serve as the primary brand for Crypton Future Media's commercial products. In March 2012, the Nomura Research Institute estimated that total sales of Hatsune Miku-branded merchandise reached approximately ¥10 billion since 2007. A 2013 survey by Tokyo Polytechnic University found that Miku had the highest name recognition among all Vocaloid products.

In 2011, Crypton expanded its marketing to North American audiences. In May 2011, a digital release of Supercell's song "World is Mine" on iTunes reached number seven on the platform's world music chart in its debut week. Crypton also solicited feedback from Japanese consumers regarding promotional strategies for overseas markets.

=== Good Smile Racing ===
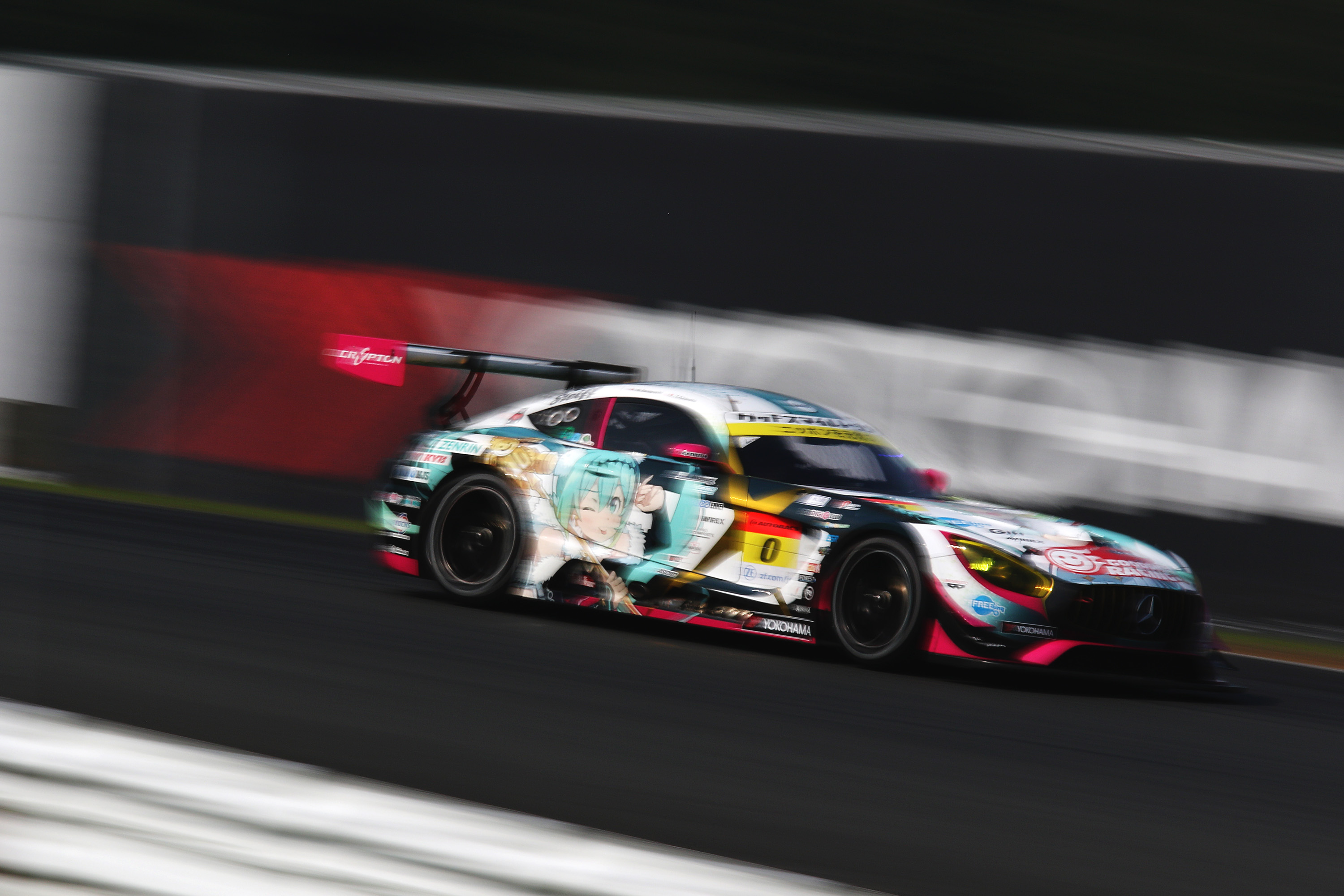
Good Smile Racing Mercedes-AMG GT3 at Fuji Speedway, 2018

In 2008, Good Smile Racing began licensing Hatsune Miku and other Crypton Future Media-related Vocaloid content. Studie participated in the 2008 and 2009 seasons using a BMW Z4 E86 painted in official Hatsune Miku art, and fan-derivative versions of Hatsune Miku in some races in the 2009 season. During race events, the team featured promotional models styled as "Racing Queens" wearing costumes inspired by Hatsune Miku and other Character Vocal Series figures.

=== Winter festivals ===
Sapporo has been a major target of sponsorship since 2010, with Crypton Future Media sponsoring the Sapporo Snow Festival. The portrayal of Hatsune Miku for the event is a derivative design called Snow Miku. Although originally this was simply a recoloring of the normal Hatsune Miku, unique designs have occurred every year since 2011, and figurines based on the design have been made based on the year's design.

The 2012 design was chosen via a contest. The winning entry was referred to as "Fluffy Coat Snow Miku". The 2013 design was called "Strawberry Daifuku Shiromuku Miku". The 2014 design was based on a magical girl design by dera_fury, who was the winner of the 2014 Snow Miku contest. The illustration was "Nekosumi". The design featured a pet called Rabbit Yukine, based on a mountain hare. From 2015 on, design submissions also include a costume for Rabbit Yukine. The 2015 design was called "Snow Bell Snow Miku" and was illustrated by Nardack.

In 2012, several ice sculptures of the Character Vocal series and several snow sculptures of Miku were produced for the event. However, on February 7, 2012, one of the Snow Miku sculptures collapsed due to thawing temperatures and was rebuilt with reinforced structural support; the incident caused minor injury to a spectator.

=== Spring festivals ===
During March 2019, Sakura Miku, a springtime variant of the character Hatsune Miku themed largely around cherry blossoms, was announced as the official supporting character for the Hirosaki Cherry Blossom Festival in Aomori Prefecture, Japan. The campaign's promotional activities were set to include illustrations of Sakura Miku by multiple artists (with the main visual illustrated by iXima, an illustrator who was credited with illustrating the packaging artwork for the Japanese version of Hatsune Miku V3 in 2013), posters, a stamp rally, and character merchandise sales at local tourist facilities.

== Cultural impact ==
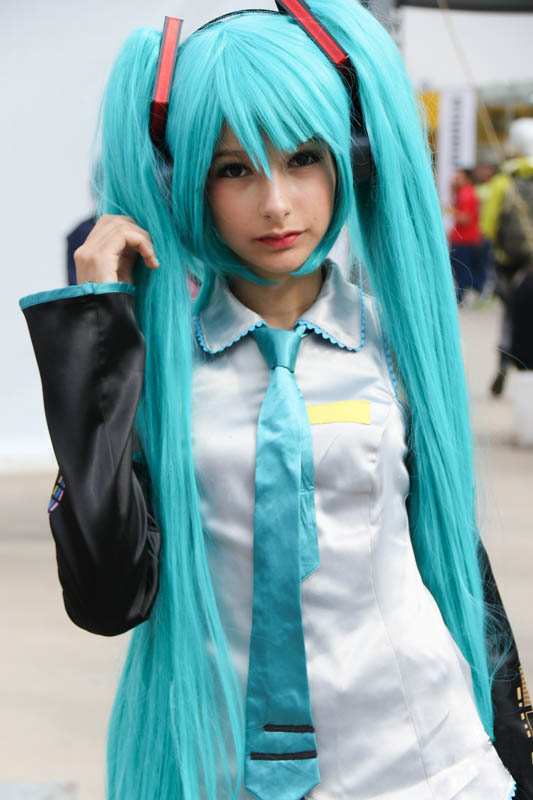
Cosplay of Hatsune Miku

Nico Nico Douga, a Japanese video streaming website similar to YouTube, played a fundamental role in the recognition and popularity of the software. Soon after Miku's release, Nico Nico Douga users started posting videos of songs created using the character's sound bank. According to Crypton, a popular video featuring Miku's chibi version, Hachune Miku, singing and dancing to "Ievan Polkka" while spinning a spring onion in homage to Loituma Girl's original video (which led to Miku being commonly associated with spring onions, as well as leeks, due to the Japanese variation looking similar to them) demonstrated the potential of the software in multimedia content creation. As Miku's recognition and popularity grew, Nico Nico Douga became a place for collaborative content creation. Popular original songs written by a user would inspire illustrations, animations in 2D and 3D, and remixes by other users. Some creators would show their unfinished work and ask for ideas.

In September 2009, three figurines based on the derivative character "Hachune Miku" were launched in a rocket from the United States state of Nevada's Black Rock Desert, though it did not reach outer space. In late November 2009, a petition was launched in order to get a custom-made Hatsune Miku aluminum plate (8 cm × 12 cm, 3.1" × 4.7") made that would be used as a balancing weight for the Japanese Venus spacecraft explorer Akatsuki. Started by Hatsune Miku fan Sumio Morioka (known online as "chodenzi-P", his producer name), this project has received the backing of Dr. Seiichi Sakamoto of the Japan Aerospace Exploration Agency. On December 22, 2009, the petition exceeded the 10,000 signatures necessary to have the plates made. An original deadline of December 20, 2009, had been set to send in the petition, but due to a couple of delays in the Akatsuki project, a new deadline of January 6, 2010, was set; by this deadline, over 14,000 signatures had been received. On May 21, 2010, at 06:58:22 (JST), Akatsuki was launched, having three plates depicting Hatsune Miku and Hachune Miku in several monochrome images, composed of the miniature letters of the messages from the petition form etched in the plates. The UK 59th issue of the music and fashion magazine Clash featured Hatsune Miku as their cover star (using a real-life photo model), with a full feature on her. The third launch of the MOMO sounding rocket by Interstellar Technologies used Hatsune Miku's voice for the countdown.

The Vocaloid software has had a notable influence on the character Black Rock Shooter, who looks like Hatsune Miku but is not linked to her by design. The character was made famous by the song "Black Rock Shooter", and a number of figurines have been made. An original video animation made by Ordet was streamed for free as part of a promotional campaign running from June 25 to August 31, 2010. A televised anime series aired in February 2012.

The flag of the city of Chiba was considered to coincidentally resemble the silhouette of Hatsune Miku, and on the 10th anniversary on August 31, 2017, the municipal government website temporarily changed its logo to look like Miku. Geoffrey Cain of GlobalPost has argued that the cultural reception of Hatsune Miku in Japan is related to historical concepts of animism and Shinto, as well as the tradition of Karakuri ningyō (automated mechanical puppets), which facilitate the public acceptance of synthetic personas.

In internet culture, Hatsune Miku has been humorously attributed as the creator of works such as the video game Minecraft and the Harry Potter book series by fans on social media in response to controversies surrounding their original authors, Markus Persson and J. K. Rowling.

Akihiko Kondo, a Japanese school administrator, unofficially married Hatsune Miku. In November 2018, he held a formal wedding with the character, attracting media attention. Crypton Future Media wrote a statement to Fox News, clarifying that the company was not involved in the wedding. Commenting on it, they said: "We see this as one individual's way of expressing his appreciation for Hatsune Miku, and we respect that."

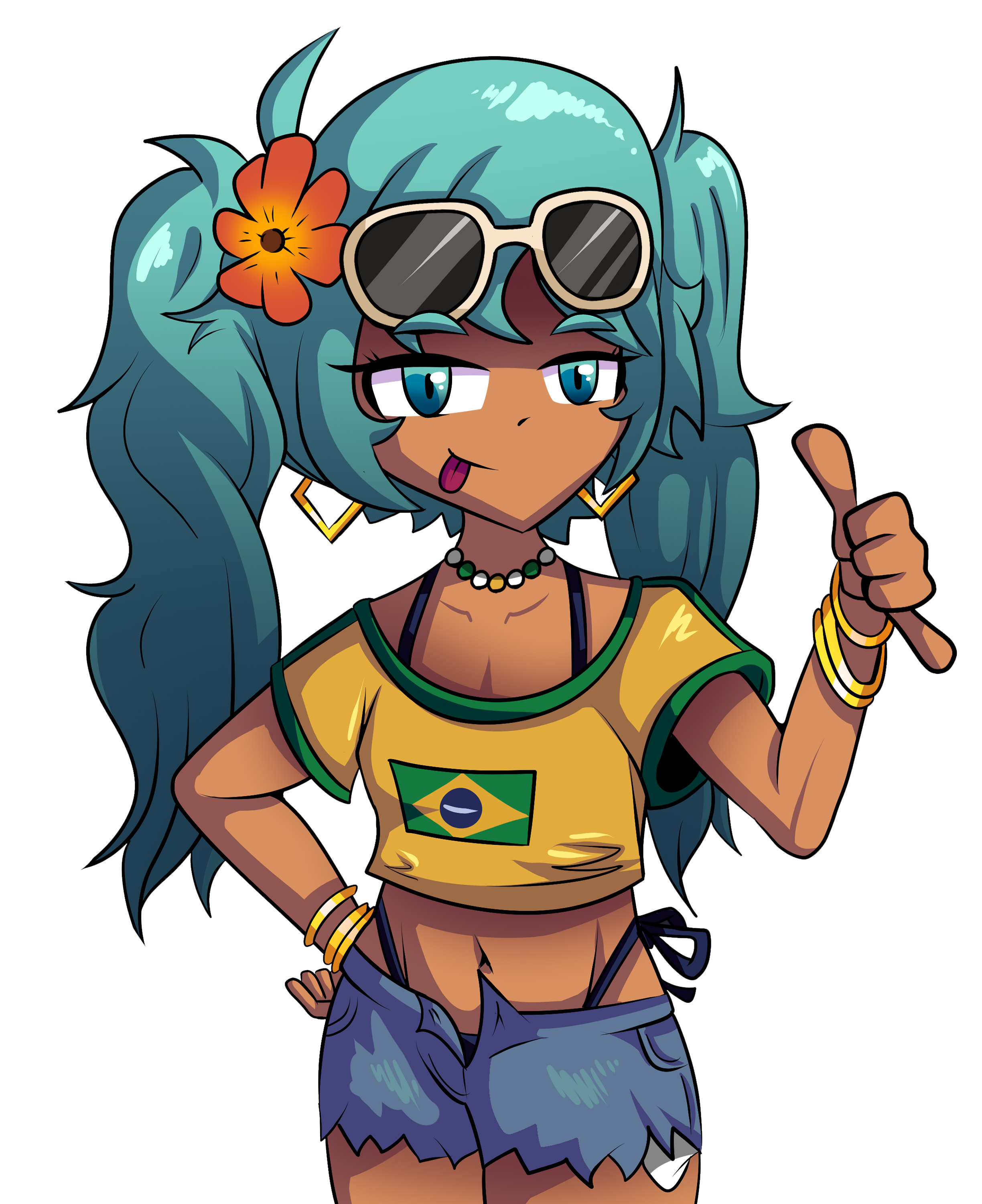
"Brazilian Miku", a fan-created derivative style of Hatsune Miku

In 2024, a fan-created variation named "Brazilian Miku" gained popularity online, in which Hatsune Miku is depicted with a darker skin tone and wearing a Brazilian soccer jersey and hotpants. Several other nationality-themed variations soon emerged, including during the 2026 FIFA World Cup.

The name "Miku" is also associated with Japanese numerical wordplay (goroawase) for the number 39 (san-kyū), which phonetically resembles the English phrase "thank you" while also permitting the alternate phonetic reading mi-ku (3–9).

=== Appearances in other media ===
Miku is the protagonist of the official anthology manga series Maker Hikōshiki Hatsune Mix, illustrated by Kei Garō, which depicts standalone, non-canonical comedic and dramatic stories featuring the character. She appeared in the anime Shinkansen Henkei Robo Shinkalion the Animation as a recurring character, and in 2022's Dropkick on My Devil! X, the third anime season based on Yukiwo's manga series, voiced directly by Saki Fujita rather than synthesized Vocaloid software.

Sega has produced a licensed series of rhythm games, Hatsune Miku: Project DIVA, which has sold over six million copies. Hatsune Miku and Future Stars: Project Mirai was developed for the Nintendo 3DS with character appearances based on the Nendoroid figure line. In 2020, the mobile rhythm game Project Sekai: Colorful Stage! (marketed as Hatsune Miku: Colorful Stage! outside Asia) was released, featuring Miku and other Crypton Vocaloids alongside human characters, with many playable songs consisting of covers of Vocaloid originals. An animated feature film adaptation, Colorful Stage! The Movie: A Miku Who Can't Sing, was released in Japanese theaters on January 17, 2025.

In 2012, a collaboration between Louis Vuitton, Marc Jacobs, and Hatsune Miku produced costumes for the opera The End, which featured Vocaloid performers in place of human actors and debuted at the Yamaguchi Center for Arts and Media. Audio manufacturer Korg released "Miku Stomp" in 2014, a guitar effects unit that emulates her vocal tone. Multiple songs featuring Miku have appeared in the Just Dance series, including "Tell Your World" in Just Dance Wii U, "Ievan Polkka" in Just Dance 2016, "PoPiPo" in Just Dance 2017, and "Love Ward" in Just Dance 2018, and a remix was featured in an LG G5 commercial. In August 2017, for her tenth anniversary, Ricoh released the Ricoh Theta SC Type Hatsune Miku, a limited-edition 360° camera featuring custom branding, an illustrated case by Fuzichoco, and an augmented-reality mobile application.

Miku has also appeared in numerous video game crossover promotions and downloadable content. She was released as DLC for the PlayStation 3 version of The Idolm@ster 2, in Persona 4: Dancing All Night, and as a playable racer in Sonic Racing: CrossWorlds (promoted alongside the five-track collaborative music project Project ONSOKU). In Phantasy Star Online 2, her outfit appeared as a costume item alongside a "Miku Dayō" Mag design. She has made appearances in the mobile RPG Brave Frontier, the online virtual world TinierMe, and Space Channel 5 VR: Kinda Funky News Flash, which featured a dedicated "space39 miku Pack" allowing players to dance alongside Miku, Ulala, 88MAN, or Pudding while unlocking a Miku-themed costume for Ulala. In 2024, tracks from Colorful Stage! were included as collectible items in Like a Dragon: Infinite Wealth, a dedicated character DLC was added to Crypt of the NecroDancer featuring an additional soundtrack with two tracks created exclusively for the game, and six themed cards were released for Magic: The Gathering Secret Lair. She was also featured in Season 7 of Fortnite Festival with character outfits and cosmetic items, and received vehicle cosmetics in Rocket League.

=== Project Voltage ===
In September 2023, a collaboration project between Pokémon and Hatsune Miku was announced, featuring 18 illustrations and 18 songs with music videos. The project also featured a live performance in 2026.

== Featured music ==
"Freely Tomorrow" by Mitchie M
Example of a song created using Vocaloid software with vocals by Hatsune Miku.

In August 2010, over 22,000 original songs had been written under the name Hatsune Miku. In 2011, it was reported that she had 100,000 songs to her name.

One of the Vocaloid compilations, Exit Tunes Presents Vocalogenesis feat. Hatsune Miku, debuted at number one on the Japanese weekly Oricon album charts dated May 31, 2010, becoming the first Vocaloid album to top the charts. Another album, Supercell, by the group Supercell, also features a number of songs using Vocaloids. Other albums, such as 19's Sound Factory's First Sound Story and Livetune's Re:package, and Re:Mikus also feature Miku's voice. Other uses of Miku include the albums Sakura no Ame (桜ノ雨) by Absorb, Miku no Kanzume (みくのかんづめ) by OSTER-project, and Unhappy Refrain (アンハッピーリフレイン) by Wowaka. The viral Nyan Cat meme featured an Utau cover of "Nyanyanyanyanyanyanya!" by Daniwell-P, the original song featuring Miku.

Hatsune Miku first featured in a "live" virtual concert during Animelo Summer Live at the Saitama Super Arena on August 22, 2009, where a video of her singing two songs was projected. Miku made her first overseas live appearance at a concert on November 21, 2009, during Anime Festival Asia (AFA) in Singapore. Her first solo "live" performance titled "Miku no Hi Kanshasai 39's Giving Day" was held at Zepp Tokyo in Odaiba, Tokyo. Miku performed in the United States on July 2, 2011, at the Nokia Theater at L.A. Live during the 2011 Anime Expo in Los Angeles. The concert followed the same format as the previous "39's Giving Day" concert. She has continued performing since then, with tours in Asia, North America, Europe, and Oceania.

A young male prototype used for the "Project If..." series was used in Sound Horizon's musical work "Ido e Itaru Mori e Itaru Ido", labeled as the "prologue maxi". The prototype sang alongside Miku for their music and is known only by the name "Junger März_Prototype β". Hatsune Miku was the opening act for Lady Gaga's world tour ArtRave: The Artpop Ball, performing throughout the first month of Gaga's tour from May 6 to June 3, 2014.

In March 2014, Hatsune Miku and Crypton Future Media collaborated with Japanese rock band Bump of Chicken on the song "Ray". The accompanying music video featured the band performing alongside a live projection of Miku in real time without post-production composite editing.

Pharrell Williams produced a remix of Livetune's song "Last Night, Goodnight" featuring Hatsune Miku. On October 8, 2014, Miku debuted on American network television performing "Sharing the World" on the Late Show with David Letterman on CBS. Hatsune Miku is featured in "B Who I Want 2 B" produced by Sophie from Namie Amuro's album Genic. The 2016 Hatsune Miku Expo tour featured American chiptune band Anamanaguchi as an opening act; to commemorate the tour, the band recorded a single track titled "Miku", which they performed live on the tour with Miku as an encore song. Big Boi (of Outkast) sampled Aura Qualic's song "DATA 2.0", featuring Hatsune Miku for his 2017 single "Kill Jill", also appearing in the song's music video. Slushii collaborated with Hatsune Miku on the song "Through the Night", released on May 11, 2018.

In January 2020, Hatsune Miku was announced as a performer at the Coachella festival in Indio, California, which was later cancelled due to the COVID-19 pandemic. On December 11, 2020, Hatsune Miku was a featured artist on a remixed version of American rapper Ashnikko's song "Daisy" titled "Daisy 2.0". In January 2024, she was once again announced as a performer at Coachella.

In 2022, American rock band Set It Off featured Hatsune Miku in their single "Why Do I", which replaces some of the vocals from their song of the same name from their Elsewhere album with Hatsune Miku.

In 2026, Hatsune Miku featured as the vocals of "Cutie Mew Mew Magic", a track in the Deltarune soundtrack for Chapter 5 arranged by Camellia.

== See also ==
- Bilibili
- Speech synthesis
- Virtual influencer
