= Sound generator =

A sound generator is a vibrating object which produces a sound. There are two main kinds of sound generators (thus, two main kinds of musical instruments).

A full cycle of a sound wave will be described in each example which consists of initial normal conditions (no fluctuations in atmospheric pressure), an increase of air pressure, a subsequent decrease in air pressure which brings it back to normal, a decrease in air pressure (less pressure than initial conditions), and lastly, an increase which brings atmospheric pressure back to normal again. Therefore, the final conditions are the same as the initial, at-rest conditions.

The first kind is simple and is called the vibrating or oscillating piston. Examples of this type of sound generator include the soundboard of a piano, the surfaces of drums and cymbals, the diaphragm of loudspeakers, etc. The forward movement of something through the atmosphere causes an immediate increase in air pressure (compression) or condensation in the air adjacent to the piston. A complete cycle, or one complete soundwave, consists of an increase of pressure in the air, a subsequent decrease of pressure so that the pressure is back to normal, and a following decrease in air pressure called rarefaction. One complete cycle is produced when a drum is hit once with force.

The second kind of sound generator is the method utilized by wind instruments, such as trumpets. At the beginning of the cycle, sound pressure is normal. Then, an opening called an aperture (such as the opening on the mouthpiece of a trumpet) is partially open and a short stream of air under pressure is released. In the second step of a full cycle, the valve is completely open and pressure is at a maximum. In the third cycle, the valve is partially closed, and the pressure has decreased from the maximum value. Then, the valve is closed and the pressure is the same as normal undisturbed atmospheric pressure. Thus, a full cycle is produced. This happens very quickly in the vibration of lips (i.e., the aforementioned "valve") as they quickly open and close (or vibrate). More examples of this type of sound instrument include sirens, organs, saxophones, and trombones.

== Electronic tone generators ==
Modern sound generation also includes electronic devices that produce precise audio frequencies, commonly used in music production, hearing tests, and scientific research. Unlike acoustic instruments, these generators create sound using digital signal processing (DSP) or analog oscillators. Examples include:

- Function generators (sine, square, sawtooth waves)
- Software-based tone generators (used in audio engineering)
- Online tone generators (web applications that produce specific frequencies)

These tools are essential in fields like acoustics research, audiology, and electronic music composition.
