= Zero-G Ltd =

Music company

Zero-G Ltd.
- Type: Public
- Industry: Software, Internet
- Genre: Music and video
- Founded: 1990
- Headquarters: London, England
- Area served: British Isles, European Union
- Products: Products
- Services: Online shopping; Music education; Consumer generated media

Zero-G is a British company that develops sound libraries, sound effects and audio loops. It also develops "singing" synthesisers using the Vocaloid engine developed by Yamaha Corporation.

== Products ==
=== Sample packs ===
In the early 1990s, Zero-G released the Datafile series, a trilogy of sample libraries comprising samples taken from the personal collection of Zero-G's founder, Ed Stratton. They were widely used in electronic music in the 1990s, particularly British house and drum and bass. The samples were unlicensed and the packs are no longer commercially available.

Zero-G has also released other known sample packs such as the Cuckooland series, Planet of the Breaks, and Ethnic Flavours.

=== Vocaloid ===
Your Fish Tank, sung by Miriam

Zero-G developed an English edition of Vocaloid software. They subsequently were given recommendations by Crypton Future Media to Yamaha Corporation. The company then went on to releasing both the first Vocaloid voices and the first English voices. The first Vocaloids, Leon and Lola, were released by Zero-G on 3 March 2004, both of which were sold as a "Virtual Soul Vocalist". Leon and Lola made their first appearance at the NAMM Show on 15 January 2004. Leon and Lola were also demonstrated at the Zero-G Limited booth during Wired Nextfest and won the 2005 Electronic Musician Editor's Choice Award. Zero-G later released Miriam, with her voice provided by Miriam Stockley, in July 2004. A patch was later released to update all Vocaloid engines to Vocaloid 1.1.2, adding new features to the software, although there were differences between the output results of the engine.

After interest in Vocaloids grew, Zero-G began reselling their Vocaloid products again on their website, and were considering to update their box art to match current Vocaloid trends better.

Zero-G's first Vocaloid 2 product, Prima, came out on 14 January 2008 with voice of a Soprano opera singer. The second Vocaloid 2 product, Sonika, is marketed as being able to speak any language, even though she is primarily an English vocalist.

An edition of Sonika was released in Taiwan on 1 August 2010. Users can choose to use the original English or traditional Chinese interface, however it does not have a Chinese language input method or a Chinese singing voice. This is the first edition of Vocaloid software widely released to speakers of Chinese.
