= Kaito (software) =

Vocaloid software

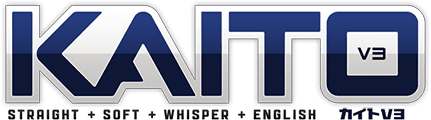

- Kaito V3 package
- Developers: Yamaha Corporation (Vocaloid), Crypton Future Media (Vocaloid 3)
- Release: February 14, 2006
- Stable release: Kaito V3 / February 15, 2013
- Operating system: Windows, OS X
- Platform: PC
- Available in: Japanese, English
- Type: Vocaloid, Piapro Studio
- License: Commercial proprietary software
- Website: www.crypton.co.jp/mp/pages/prod/vocaloid/kaitov3.jsp

Kaito (Japanese: カイト), officially stylized as KAITO, is a Voice Synth developed by Yamaha Corporation for the Vocaloid engine, and distributed by Crypton Future Media. He has performed at live concerts onstage as an animated projection along with Crypton's other Voice Synth characters. His original codename was "TARO" back during "Project Daisy", the predecessor of Vocaloid, and was one of the original four known vocals for the project. His voice provider is Japanese singer Naoto Fūga. He was the fifth and final vocal released for the original Vocaloid software, and the second vocal released in Japanese.

The product's name was invited to be chosen by the public, and "Kaito" was selected from among the applicants, which was Vocaloid producer Shu-tP's offered idea. One of the reasons why his name "Kaito" was selected was because it would be easy for non-Japanese speakers to pronounce, and it looked fitting with the name Meiko when they were put next to one another.

In all releases, Kaito is marketed as the counterpart of Meiko.

== Development ==
Kaito was developed by Yamaha, and distributed by Crypton Future Media. His voice was created by taking vocal samples from his voice provider at a controlled pitch and tone.

=== Additional software ===
A Vocaloid 2 update for Kaito was in development, but was scrapped after it failed to meet the deadline for Vocaloid 2's retirement. One of the beta versions of the vocals was used in Hatsune Miku and Future Stars: Project Mirai, with the most notable use being the song "On the Rocks", Composed by veteran Vocaloid music producer OSTER Project. The song also utilizes the unreleased Meiko Append vocal as well. The results are noticeably smoother and more natural sounding compared to the original Kaito vocal. OSTER Project was one of a select few producers who were given access to these vocals.

On February 15, 2013, a new version of Kaito, called Kaito V3, was released for Vocaloid 3 containing four different vocals for Kaito:

- Straight: A vocal designed to hold the tone of the original Kaito vocal, but being much higher in quality to match the standards of Vocaloid 3 at the time. This vocal was originally known as "Normal" during development.
- Soft: A vocal designed to give a softer tone to song lyrics. Crypton themselves considered this vocal to be Kaito's most natural-sounding vocal.
- Whisper: A vocal with a gentle, soft whisper-like tone suited for calmer songs. Compared to the other vocals within the Kaito V3 package, Whisper is more capable of handling slower songs.
- English: A vocal designed to give Kaito the ability to sing in English. This vocal allows for better English results than what would be achieved by using his Japanese vocals for the same purpose (a common practice among Voice Synth users).

A fifth vocal, "Light", was mentioned by Crypton employee and lead developer Wataru Sasaki (responsible for the creation of the Hatsune Miku software) as one of three experimental vocals whose wavelengths he was playing around with at the time, and had expressed desire to release it at some point in the future. However, the vocal remains unreleased and little is known about it.

Once imported into the engine, the 3 Japanese vocals can access the Vocaloid 4 function Cross-Synthesis (XSY).

It is known that there was the consideration of updating Kaito to Vocaloid 4, however details regarding this remain vague. The update ultimately never came to fruition by the time of Vocaloid 4's retirement upon the release of Vocaloid 5 in 2018. During Hatsune Miku Magical Mirai 2019, Crypton announced their departure from Vocaloid to focus on the development of their own voice synthesis engine, Piapro Studio NT. Despite this, Crypton stated that the Vocaloid releases would continue to be sold in parallel to future Piapro Studio NT releases.

== Marketing ==
After initial release in 2006, Kaito was considered "a commercial failure". At the time, Vocaloid was advertised mostly in magazines for Desktop Musicians, and the DTM community at the time was 80% male. Crypton's CEO assumed that few people in the community would want to buy a male voice. Upon release, Kaito sold only 500 units in his first year, in which he needed to sell 1,000+ units to be counted as "successful" commercially. By comparison, Meiko was more positively received and sold 3,000+ units. After this, 100 units were sold in January 2008 and this amount began to rise rapidly. By 18 June 2008, Kaito sold an additional 1,000 units; twice as much as his initial sales. This shocked the Vocaloid developers at Crypton Future Media, who were surprised by the sudden interest in older Vocaloid software.

At the height of his sales, he was the only one of the two Vocaloid engine vocals to have a consistent ranking as one of the Crypton's Top Ten Products. In 2010, Kaito was ranked as the 7th most popular Vocaloid product they sold. In some instances after his rediscovery, Vocaloid Kaito was even more popular than the Vocaloid 2 engine Appends for Miku and the Kagamines.

Unlike Kaito, Kaito V3 was very well received upon release. In April 2013, Crypton updated its music software sales page and the data showed that Kaito V3 was the best-selling product in March of that year. He managed to surpass Meiko V3 in sales and in August 2014, was in third place while she remained in sixth; first and second place were held by Hatsune Miku V3 and Hatsune Miku V3 Complete respectively.

Initially, Kaito was the least popular compared to Meiko. This would later flip, in which Kaito is now popular compared to Meiko, who now is the least popular Voice Synth product offered by Crypton.

== Characteristics ==
The image on the box art of the original Kaito package was not meant to be a personification of the vocal, as would be the case with later Vocaloid products. As of Vocaloid 3, the character on the boxart has been accepted as the official personification of Kaito. For his V3 update, Kaito was redesigned by iXima, an illustrator from Osaka, Japan. This redesign kept key elements of his original concept art, but modernized Kaito's overall appearance.

Kaito's primary design color is blue, and the defining features his design include his short blue hair and his muffler (scarf). In keeping with the blue theme, Kaito's nails are painted blue as well. Painted nails are considered a staple of Crypton's Piapro Characters. Hatsune Miku's are painted teal, Kagamine Rin & Len's are painted yellow, Megurine Luka's are painted light blue, and Meiko's are painted red.

Name	Kaito
Release	February 14, 2006 (Yamaha); February 17, 2006 (Crypton Future Media); February 15, 2013 (V3)
Suggested Genre	Folk, pop, rock, soft rock, ambient, ballads, jazz, soul, crossover, dance, electronica
Suggested Tempo	90-200bpm (V3 Straight), 80-180bpm (V3 Soft), 65-150bpm (V3 Whisper), 70-190bpm (V3 ENG)
Suggested Vocal Range	B1-C3 (V3 Straight), D2-B2 (V3 Soft), F2-D3 (V3 Whisper), B1-B2 (V3 ENG)

== Featured music ==
The song "シャンティ (SHANTI)" by wotaku is one of Kaito's most popular songs, and his most viewed song to date, with 13 million views on the official YouTube upload. It is also wotaku's most notable song.
