= Vocaloid 2 =

2007 singing voice synthesizer

- Vocaloid 2 on Windows 10
- Original author: Yamaha Corporation
- Developers: Yamaha Corporation; Bplats
- Release: June 29, 2007
- Final release: 2.0.12 / November 6, 2010
- Operating system: Microsoft Windows
- Predecessor: Vocaloid (software)
- Successor: Vocaloid 3
- Available in: English, Japanese
- Type: Voice Synthesizer Software
- License: Proprietary
- Website: Vocaloid 2 Character Lineup at the Wayback Machine (archived February 2, 2013)

Vocaloid 2 (Note: Japanese: ＶＯＣＡＬＯＩＤ２. (while Yamaha uses the latin alphabet to write the official name, it unofficially uses "ボーカロイド" (Bōkaroido) in katakana within its documentation and press releases in Japanese).) is a singing vocal synthesizer and the successor to the Vocaloid voice synthesizer application by Yamaha. Unlike the first engine, Vocaloid 2 based its output on vocal samples, rather than voice analysis. The synthesis engine and the user interface were completely revamped, with Japanese Vocaloids possessing a Japanese interface, as opposed to the previous version, which used English for both versions. It is noteworthy for introducing the popular character Hatsune Miku. It was succeeded by Vocaloid 3. This version was not backward compatible with the original Vocaloid engine. Its first voice bank, Sweet Ann, was released in 2007. New features included note auditioning, transparent control track, toggling between playback and rendering, and expression control.

== History ==
Vocaloid 2 was announced in 2007. Unlike the first engine, Vocaloid 2 based its synthesis on vocal samples, rather than analysis of the human voice. Due to time constraints, unlike the previous engine, it did not have a public beta test and instead bugs were patched as users reported them. The synthesis engine and the user interface were completely revamped, with Japanese Vocaloids possessing a Japanese interface, as opposed to all versions being in English, as was the case with its predecessor. New features included note auditioning, transparent control track, toggling between playback and rendering, and expression control. One's breath and voice could also be recorded into the library to make realistic sounds. This version was not backward compatible with the original Vocaloid engine, and its editor could not load libraries built for the previous version.

In addition to the PC software, Yamaha also offered an online service called NetVocaloid. This software was not localized, and Vocaloids made with either the English or Japanese in mind version would only be compatible with their respective version; for example, although Megurine Luka had an English library included, as a Japanese Vocaloid she was only usable with the Japanese version of the software.

Yamaha also released a version of the Vocaloid 2 software for the iPhone and iPad, which was first exhibited at the Y2 Autumn 2010 Digital Content Expo in Japan. This version of the software was later released using the voice of Yamaha's own Vocaloid called VY1. These products were launched as iVocaloid and i-Vocaloid, though the latter was later renamed to VocaloWitter.

Unlike the original Vocaloid software, Vocaloid 2 vocals could be imported into Vocaloid 3. However, it was not possible to import any Vocaloid 2 vocals into Vocaloid Neo or the Mac ports of Vocaloid Editor for Cubase. It was also possible to import Vocaloid 2 vocals into Vocaloid 4, either by importing them into Vocaloid 3 then Vocaloid 4, or via the use of the Vocaloid 2 import tool. Furthermore, while VSTi plug-in support for the software was provided, Vocaloid 2 would not work with some digital audio workstations such as Sonar, and had compatibility issues with others such as Fl Studio.

In total, there were 35 vocal libraries produced for Vocaloid 2; 17 in the Japanese version, and five in the English version.

Support for Vocaloid 2 ended in March 2016.

== Products ==
=== Sweet Ann ===
Released on June 29, 2007 by PowerFX, Sweet Ann was originally developed for the original Vocaloid engine, but was later ported to Vocaloid 2, and was released as the first voice bank for the engine. She was also released in Taiwan on September 7, 2011, with boxart that was reworked for the Taiwanese market. She was sold as the "Space lounge vocal sensation".

Sweet Ann's most notable use was in the anime Nichijou.

=== Hatsune Miku ===
Released on August 31, 2007 as the first of the "Character Voice Series", her codename was "CV01" and she was designed to sound cute. She was the first vocal not based on a professional singer results and based on the voice of Saki Fujita. She was the first vocal to be developed and distributed by Crypton Future Media and sung in Japanese. Her instant success is owed to Vocaloid being a cultural hit in Japan and she reportedly sold 40,000 units by July 2008, selling on average 300 units a week. By Jan 2011, she had sold 60,000 units. Due to the success of the product, a later expansion pack was released on April 30, 2010 called "Hatsune Miku append" which added 6 new voices ("dark", "soft", "solid", "light", "vivid" and "sweet") for the Miku vocal.

=== Kagamine Rin/Len ===
Released on December 27, 2007, Kagamine Rin and Len are a pair of Japanese vocals based on the voice of Asami Shimoda and codenamed "CV02", being the second package for the Character Voice series. They were created to be a male and female pair of vocals that could fulfill a variety of roles within music. They were not as successful as Hatsune Miku, selling 20,000 units by July 2008. On July 18, 2008, due to numerous complaints about the quality of their vocals in comparison to Hatsune Miku, a second version of the package called "Act2" was released to replace the original Kagamine Rin/Len voice. The Crypton Future Media end-user agreement was also updated with the Act2 release to make it more easier to understand. Like the Hatsune Miku vocal, they too received an expansion pack titled "Kagamine Rin/Len Append," adding 3 voices each for Rin ("power", "warm", "sweet") and Len ("power", "cold" and "serious"), a total of 6 altogether.

=== Prima ===
Prima was a female English vocal released by Zero-G Ltd. She possessed the voice of a female Soprano opera singer and sang in English. Prima was first demonstrated along with Sweet Ann and Big Al at the NAMM show in 2007, and was released on January 14, 2008. Prima was noted for having a customized English library with more phonetic sounds than the standard English vocal contained.

=== Gackpoid ===
Gackpoid is a male vocal developed by Internet Co., Ltd. His voice was sampled from the Japanese singer and actor Gackt. The mascot of the software is called Camui Gackpo, after Gackt's alias name. Gackpo is sometimes referred to as Gackpo Camui or Gakupo Kamui, and usually referred to as Kamui Gakupo.

=== Megurine Luka ===
Megurine Luka was the third and final member of the Character Voice series. She was noteworthy for being the first vocal capable of both English and Japanese speech. She was released on January 30, 2009, and was codenamed "CV03" prior to release. Her English vocal initially did not have a full library and was capable of only 2,200 words, though she was later updated to fix the problem. It is notable that her package was originally going to be called "Hatsune Miku", designed when Vocaloid 2 was first announced to be a bilingual English and Japanese vocal, being the first planned member of the Character Voice series.

=== Megpoid ===
Megpoid is a Vocaloid by Internet Co., Ltd. Her voice is sampled by Megumi Nakajima. The mascot of the software is called GUMI. The name GUMI is the voice provider Megumi Nakajima's nickname from her childhood. The software name, "Megpoid", was taken from the provider's name, "Megumi." The second half, the "poid", is short for "like Vocaloid," the full implied name of this product is "Megumi-like Vocaloid."

=== Sonika ===
Sonika was an English vocal developed by Zero-G Limited and released in July 2009. She was advertised as a "virtual vocalist modeled on the voice of a young girl pop singer". Sonika was the first Zero-G vocal to be based on an amateur singer's voice rather than that of a professional.

=== SF-A2 Miki ===
Designed to be a professional product, she was one of three products released on December 4, 2009 by AH-Software. She was based on the voice of Miki Furukawa and sings in Japanese.

=== Kaai Yuki ===
The second vocal released on December 4, 2009 by AH-Software. She is designed to be a Japanese vocal with human characteristics. Her voice is based on a child's voice and is not meant to be a professional singer.

=== Hiyama Kiyoteru ===
Hiyama Kiyoteru was the third product released on December 4, 2009 by AH-Software. He is a male voice with humanistic qualities to it. He was designed to be Kaai Yuki's school teacher. The voice is based upon the voice of Kiyoshi Hiyama and sings in Japanese.

=== Big Al ===
Big Al was an English vocal developed and distributed by Crypton PowerFX Systems AB. Al had a deep toned, masculine sounding voice, and was the complementary vocal to Sweet Ann. He was announced on January 21, 2007, and was released on December 22, 2009. He was released with a voice provided by ex-employee Frank Sanderson after the intended provider, Elvis Presley impersonator Michael King, was unable to return for further recordings after his initial samples were considered not at a high enough quality to be released.

=== Tonio ===
A male voice that was designed to be a complementary voice to Prima. After a 5-month delay, he was released in July 2010 by Zero-G Limited. Tonio was advertised as a "virtual vocalist modelled on the voice of professional male classical singer". Like Prima, he is an opera based vocal and covers the ranges from baritone to tenor.

=== Lily ===
Lily is a Japanese vocal developed by Internet Co., Ltd. and released on August 25, 2010. She was a promotional product produced with Avex Management. Her voice was provided by Yuri Masuda, a Japanese singer, musician, and performance artist from Japanese band m.o.v.e. Unlike the previous two vocals released by Internet Co., Ltd., Lily's product did not have a separate name for both product and mascot.

=== VY1 ===
VY1 was developed under the codename of "Mizki" as a professional Japanese female vocal with no mascot, designed to fulfill any role and head any Yamaha Vocaloid product. It was released on September 1, 2010 by Bplats and designed to act as a "Standard" vocal of noted quality for the Vocaloid software. It was released on September 1, 2010. It handled samples differently to previous Japanese vocaloids. It sold with a standard and a "deluxe" version, the deluxe version came with a CD called "feat.VY1". The CD featured various songs and producer made content and was designed to display the creative freedom that VY1 brought. This was due to it having no official set mascot, leaving her appearance, age and even gender be up to the producer.

=== Gachapoid ===
Gachapoid was the third and final "Poid" product released by Internet Co., Ltd. for the Vocaloid 2 engine. He sang in Japanese and was meant to be based on the character of Gachapin. The mascot of the product is "Ryūto" and is based upon the Gachapin voice of Kuniko Amemiya. It was released on October 8, 2010.

=== Nekomura Iroha ===
Nekomura Iroha was the 4th product by AH-Software released for the Vocaloid 2 engine, and was created in collaboration with Sanrio. She was released on October 22, 2010, and had a deep but cute Japanese female voice.

=== Utatane Piko ===
Utatane Piko was a high pitched male Japanese vocal developed distributed by Ki/oon Music Inc. under Sony Music Entertainment Japan, and was released in December 2010. His voice was provided by the Japanese pop singer Piko. He was released for download only on December 8, 2010.

=== VY2 ===
VY2 was the second addition to the "VY" series, after VY1 and was designed to complement the VY1 voice, its codename is "Yūma". The voice of VY2 is masculine and sings in Japanese. It was released on April 25, 2011. VY1 it also was designed to be unbound by having no set avatar allowing it to take any appearance, sex or age. Effort was made to disassociate VY2 with anything personal, bares a sword on the boxart because they felt items such as clothing would be too personal but chose its codename to help direct producers to the direction the voice was heading for of a handsome young male. A producer working with the VY2 found when he wrote a song that VY2 was the only male Japanese vocal that could produce a quality of vocal good enough for the song and he labelled the vocal as the best Japanese male. When producing this vocal, the developers had compare it also with other masculine vocals within the series (excluding Ryuto and Kagamine Len, both of which are voiced by female vocalists), with only the Gackpoid software coming close to VY2.

=== Azuki Masaoka/Matcha Kobayashi ===
Only usable in 575 Utami, these two voices are based on Yuka Ōtsubo (Azuki Masaoka) and Ayaka Ohashi (Matcha Kobayashi). They are a pair of female vocals produced by Sega to sing within the game in Japanese.

=== Megurine Luka Append, Meiko V2, Kaito V2 and Hatsune Miku English ===
Crypton Future Media had produced vocals for this version of the software Renders of the beta vocals could be heard in various mediums. Meiko was used in the song "Piano × Forte × Scandal" (ピアノ×フォルテ×スキャンダル) on the album Oster-san no Best (OSTERさんのベスト). Originally, the song used Meiko's original Vocaloid vocal. Luka's Append vocal was used on the album Vocaloid Minzoku Chō Kyokushū (VOCALOID民族調曲集) for the song "Hoshizora to Yuki no Butōkai (Zeal mix)". The promotional album Vocalo Append used a beta of Luka's "Soft" Append. Miku's English vocal in particular was low quality and was not released in the engine for this reason. The vocals were announced to have been dropped in favor of Vocaloid 3 productions on December 1, 2011. Songs using the beta versions also featured in Hatsune Miku and Future Stars: Project Mirai.

With the exception of the Megurine Luka Append, which was later released for Vocaloid 4, all vocals were later released as Vocaloid 3 products.

A 7th Hatsune Miku Append vocal "Falsetto" was also created but never released due to its limited usefulness.

=== Megpoid Extend ===
It was an "Append-like" vocal package designed for Megpoid. It was later change to the V3 Megpoid package.

== Critical reception ==
Vocaloid 2 was generally better received than its predecessor. John Walden of Sound on Sound had reviewed Leon, Lola and Miriam and noted that Vocaloid itself had no previous rival technology to contend with, and praised Yamaha for their efforts as Vocaloid was an ambitious project to undertake, considering that the human voice was more complex to synthesize than instruments such as the violin. In his review of Vocaloid 2, he referred to the original software engine in a passing comment stating, "Undoubtedly a remarkable and innovative product and, with experience and patience, was capable of producing results that could be frighteningly realistic." While he congratulated the improvements made in Vocaloid 2, he noted the software was still far from being regarded as a top rate singer. Particularly what makes Vocaloid difficult to sell as a product is the notion that the human ear can pick up faults in vocal speech. When reviewing Tonio, Sound on Sound writer Tom Flint argued that with the amount of time it takes to understand and learn how to use the software, it would be easier to hire a singer for half an hour to do the recording session. He, along with fellow writer John Walden during a review on Sonika, both stated singers don't have to fear losing their jobs just yet.

The Vocaloid 2 software was an instant success in Japan upon the release of the Hatsune Miku product. Bil Byrant of PowerFX, in an interview after the release of Big Al, noted that when they released Sweet Ann that they expected the electronica based music producers to use Vocaloid and were surprised that they were reluctant to embrace the software. At this point, a large Japanese producer base had formed and a large number of videos were being posted on YouTube. Hatsune Miku's success at selling 60,000 copies was also a noteworthy number, as at the time of Miku's release selling 1,000 copies of a software synthesizer was considered "a commercial success".

The Hatsune Miku product in particular went on to win several awards including;

- She was nominated for and won an award in the "All About" awards of 2007.
- Crypton Future Media picked up a BCN award in 2008 for their productions, with their sales reaching a 211% increase thanks to several products (One of which being Hatsune Miku).
- In March 2008, Hatsune Miku won the "Digital Content" AMD award.
- In June, Hatsune Miku picked up the 2008 MM Research Institute award.
- At the DaiKon7 in August 2008, Hatsune Miku received another award.
- Hatsune Miku was awarded the "Good Design Award 2008".
- Hatsune Miku won the Grand Prize at the BCN AWARD 2009.

As reported in 2014 by Crypton Future Media's website "Sonicwire", Vocaloid2 was able to compete against the sales of Vocaloid3 vocals even as late as 2014, both Crypton themselves and fellow developer PowerFX vocaloids saw sales from both versions despite the improvements made in Vocaloid3.
