= Crypton Future Media =

Japanese media company

Crypton Future Media, Inc.
- Native name: クリプトン・フューチャー・メディア株式会社
- Type: Kabushiki gaisha (unlisted)
- Industry: Software, Internet
- Genre: Music
- Founded: July 1995; 31 years ago
- Headquarters: 11F Nihon Seimei Sapporo Bldg., 1-1 Nishi4 Kita3, Chūō-ku, Sapporo 060-0003 Japan
- Area served: Japan
- Key people: Hiroyuki Itō (伊藤 博之), President
- Products: Vocaloid: Sound generator software; Sampling CDs and DVDs; FX libraries; BGM libraries
- Services: Online shopping; Online community; Mobile content
- Number of employees: 130
- Divisions: Media Phage; FX and BGM libraries; Mobile Contents Service Provider
- Website: www.crypton.co.jp (in Japanese)

Crypton Future Media, Inc. (クリプトン・フューチャー・メディア株式会社, Kuriputon Fyūchā Media Kabushiki gaisha), or simply Crypton, is a Japanese media company based in Sapporo, Japan. It develops, imports, and sells products for music, such as sound generator software, sampling CDs and DVDs, and FX and BGM libraries. The company also provides services of online shopping, online community, and mobile content.

== History ==
Crypton Future Media was founded in July 1995 by Hiroyuki Itō. The company began operations in Sapporo as a "trading house for sounds", importing and selling audio products such as sound effects, background music (BGM), and sampling CDs from international sources. Around 2000, Crypton expanded its digital content lineup to include sound effects for mobile phone ringtones and began operating mobile services.

Crypton subsequently entered the vocal synthesis market by collaborating with Yamaha Corporation, taking charge of the commercial releases for the first Japanese Vocaloids, Meiko in 2004 and Kaito in 2006. In 2007, the company released its own singing synthesizer software and virtual singer, Hatsune Miku. Miku's immense success shifted the company's focus toward character licensing and empowering digital content creators. In response to the explosion of user-generated content, Crypton launched the Piapro online community in December 2007 to allow fans to upload and share their derivative works.

In 2014, Crypton began organizing "Miku Expo", a series of worldwide augmented reality concert tours starring Hatsune Miku, further establishing the company's global presence.

== Overview ==
Crypton Future Media started business importing audio products in 1995, and has been involved in the development, import, and sales of sampling CDs and DVDs, FX and BGM libraries, and musical synthesizer/synthesiser applications. Its main business partners in Japan include musical instrument shops, computer stores, and software distributors.

The company has licensed software to the following organizations:

- Video game publishers and developers, such as Konami, Sega, Sony Interactive Entertainment, Bandai Namco Entertainment, and Nintendo
- Public and private broadcasting media (television, radio, and cable), such as NHK
- American computer manufacturers, such as Apple Inc., Dell, and Microsoft
- Musical instrument companies, such as Roland Corporation and Yamaha Corporation
- Public institutions, such as local governments, the Ministry of Defense and the Ministry of Education, Culture, Sports, Science and Technology
- Educational institutions, such as high schools, universities, and vocational schools

Crypton Future Media also operates a number of Japanese mobile websites, mainly for i-mode of NTT docomo, EZweb of au by KDDI, and Yahoo! Keitai of SoftBank Mobile, to distribute ringtones, sound effects (SFX), and voice-based ringtones (chaku-voice), including:

- Hatsune Miku Mobile
- Pocket Sound Effect Pro
- Mazeteyo Nama Voice

Crypton Future Media imports products from more than 50 international suppliers based in Austria, Canada, Denmark, France, Germany, Hungary, Italy, Russia, South Africa, South Korea, Sweden, Switzerland, the United Kingdom, and the United States.

In 2010, Crypton Future Media was announced as a number-one company for sound-related software, bringing a share of 21.4% of the marketing for its products.

== Vocaloid products and services ==
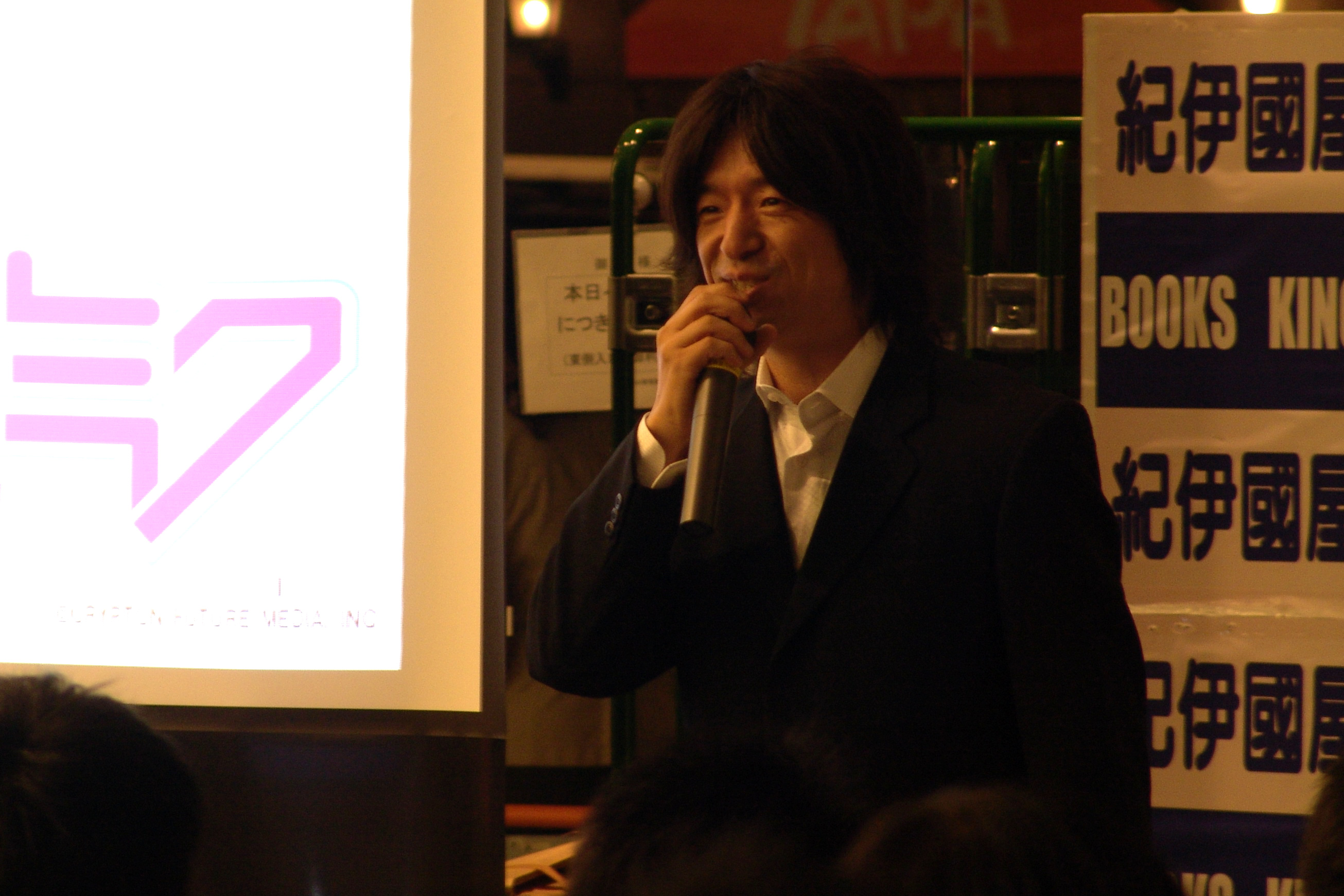
On October 12, 2008, Crypton president Hiroyuki Itō made a speech at the Science Café titled "Hatsune Miku Night - the diva transcending science" in Sapporo.

Crypton is best known for production and sales of speech synthesis software for computer music. Its products use the Vocaloid singing synthesis engine developed by Yamaha Corporation; they were also charged with finding and contacting English studios in order to gain recommendations for the English version of the Vocaloid software. The company released Meiko in 2004 and Kaito in 2006, who were originally developed by Yamaha leaving the commercial release to Crypton Future Media. The company then released the first Vocaloid developed by them, and member of the official Character Vocal Series, Hatsune Miku, which used the upgraded engine Vocaloid 2. The success of the Hatsune Miku Voicebank in Japan (and later in other countries) greatly raised Crypton's profile. The second Character Vocal Series are Kagamine Rin and Len and the third Megurine Luka. Because the popularity of these Vocaloids grew, Crypton launched the website Piapro to upload fan-made content and its own music label KarenT to sell Vocaloid songs.

On 31 August 2019, it was confirmed that Crypton ceased releasing new Vocaloid products on Yamaha's synthesis engine and Cubase editor. Instead, they will release new "Vocaloid" products on their newly-developed Piapro Studio engine-editor with the name NT (New Type) once Crypton has removed compatibility with the Cubase editor for their speech synthesis products.

They, however, reversed this decision on August 30th 2024 with the release of the PIAPRO SUPERPACK powered by the VOCALOID4 engine.

A new version of Hatsune Miku V6 was also announced. Originally planned for the end of 2024, she was then delayed to a 2025 release.

=== Vocaloid products ===
Kaito was the only one sold using the Vocaloid 1.1 engine; the previous Vocaloids before him were sold as Vocaloid 1.0, which he was also supplied with. However, he needed the additional Vocaloid 1.1.2 patch to work on the Vocaloid 1.0 engine. A patch was later released to update all Vocaloid engines to Vocaloid 1.1.2, adding new features to the software, although there were differences between the output results of the engine. Even though Kaito and Meiko were Japanese and sung using Japanese phonetics, the main interface was written in English for both English and Japanese Vocaloids.

Due to the success of placing a character on the box art of Meiko, the concept was carried over to her successor Kaito and later Vocaloids to encourage creativity; however, neither Vocaloid's box art originally had the intention to represent that Vocaloid. Though Meiko experienced good sales, Kaito failed commercially, causing less demand for male voices for a while after Kaito's initial release. However, sales eventually picked up and Kaito later won the Nico Nico Douga second best seller award of 2008. In 2010, it was reported that Meiko and Kaito were in the discussion to receive updates. Several updated vocal expressions have already been recorded for Kaito that year. In April 2011, it was confirmed six vocal expressions had been created for Kaito, two of which were dropped and the remaining four were being brought forward with one having reached alpha stage at that point. The Character Vocal (Hatsune Miku, Kagamine Rin/Len and Megurine Luka) series Appends had been created from the vocal performances of their voice providers; however the new Kaito Appends were created by adding echo, force, and tension to the samples.

Product	Language	Gender	Voice actor	Release date
Meiko	Japanese	Female	Meiko Haigō	November 5, 2004
Kaito	Japanese	Male	Naoto Fūga	February 17, 2006

=== Vocaloid 2 products ===
Crypton released Hatsune Miku, on August 31, 2007. The second of the Character Vocal Series is the first dual Vocaloid Kagamine Len and Kagamine Rin, a Japanese male and female, released on December 27, 2007. On July 18, 2008, the updated edition of Kagamine Rin and Len, named "act2" was released. For a period of time, users who had bought the old version were allowed to get the new version for free. On June 18, 2008, beta demonstration songs using the new version were released on the company's official blog. The expansion disc is an entirely different software and does not affect the original Kagamine Rin/Len installation in any way, giving the user options to either use the old or new voice sets exclusively or combine their usage. Crypton Future Media have now retired the sale of their old Kagamine Vocaloid and it is now no longer possible to buy the software from them. This was also the very first Vocaloid update to be done for any Vocaloid. The third product of Crypton's Character Vocal Series is Megurine Luka, the first bilingual Vocaloid.

On April 30, 2010, an updated version of Miku called Hatsune Miku Append was released containing a package of six different tones of Miku's voice: Soft (gentle, delicate voice), Sweet (young, chibi voice), Dark (mature, heartbroken-like voice), Vivid (bright, cheerful voice), Solid (loud, clear voice), and Light (innocent, heavenly voice). Crypton Future Media also released Kagamine Rin/Len Append on December 27, 2010.

Product	Language	Gender	Voice actor	Release date
Hatsune Miku (CV01)	Japanese	Female	Saki Fujita	August 31, 2007
Kagamine Rin/Len (CV02)	Japanese	Female (Rin), Male (Len)	Asami Shimoda	December 27, 2007
Kagamine Rin/Len (CV02) Act 2	Japanese	Female (Rin), Male (Len)	Asami Shimoda	July 18, 2008
Megurine Luka (CV03)	Japanese, English	Female	Yū Asakawa	January 30, 2009
Hatsune Miku Append	Japanese	Female	Saki Fujita	April 30, 2010
Kagamine Rin/Len Append	Japanese	Female (Rin), Male (Len)	Asami Shimoda	December 27, 2010

- Crypton has a "Project if..." with a mysterious, childlike voice.
- Crypton has also done some work on a "CV04" with a male voice

=== Vocaloid 3 products ===
According to Crypton, a petition started on Facebook exceeded the needed 39,390 members in November 2010 to join Hatsune Miku's account for an English version to be released; Crypton announced that they were working on an English Miku and was planned to be released in 2013. Hatsune Miku English was released on August 31, 2013. Hatsune Miku V3 was released September 26, 2013.

Product	Language	Gender	Voice actor	Release date
Kaito V3	Japanese, English	Male	Naoto Fūga	February 15, 2013
Hatsune Miku V3 English	English	Female	Saki Fujita	August 31, 2013
Hatsune Miku V3	Japanese	Female	Saki Fujita	September 26, 2013
Meiko V3	Japanese, English	Female	Meiko Haigō	February 4, 2014

=== Vocaloid 4 products ===
Product	Language	Gender	Voice actor	Release date
Megurine Luka V4X	Japanese, English	Female	Yū Asakawa	March 19, 2015
Kagamine Rin/Len V4X	Japanese	Female (Rin), Male (Len)	Asami Shimoda	December 24, 2015
Kagamine Rin/Len V4 English	English	Female (Rin), Male (Len)	Asami Shimoda	December 24, 2015
Hatsune Miku V4X	Japanese	Female	Saki Fujita	August 30, 2016
Hatsune Miku V4 English	English	Female	Saki Fujita	August 30, 2016
Hatsune Miku V4 Chinese	Chinese (Mandarin)	Female	Saki Fujita	September 10, 2017
Piapro Characters Super Pack	Japanese	Female (Luka, Meiko, Miku and Rin), Male (Kaito and Len)	Various	August 30, 2024

=== Piapro ===
In response to the growing popularity of derivative works created with Hatsune Miku and the other Vocaloid applications, Crypton opened an online community Piapro (stylized as PIAPRO) on December 3, 2007. Vocaloid fans can upload their own content, such as music, art, lyrics, characters, and 3D models to the platform. "Piapro" stands for peer production and promotes consumer generated media.

==== Piapro Studio ====
Also under the Piapro brand is Crypton's Piapro Studio, a Vocaloid vocal editor implemented as a VST/AU plugin bundled with all of their full V3 Vocaloid products (Miku V3, Miku V3 English, Miku V3 Bundle, Meiko V3, Kaito V3). This allows for full vocal editing functionality nearly identical in feature support to Yamaha's full Vocaloid 3 Editor software, which is available either as a standalone application or a plugin for Cubase. All Vocaloid 3 voice libraries include the Tiny Vocaloid 3 Editor for free, however this is severely limited in functionality compared to the full V3 editor - serving mainly as a beginner's taste of Vocaloid editing or a way to easily test out a new vocal library. Piapro Studio was created to allow owners of Crypton's V3 products to have a fully featured vocal editor with a modernized and streamlined interface bundled free of charge. It also allows for the loading of 3rd-party, non-Crypton Vocaloid 3 voicebanks - as well as V2's that have been imported into the full V3 editor beforehand. Being a VST plugin, it allows the user to operate entirely within their DAW of choice, in contrast to the tiny or full V3 editors which are standalone applications and the user must export a wav to import into their DAW each time a change or update is needed - or export an updated wav file from their DAW as the background music to import into the V3 editor allowing for convenient editing and a smoother workflow. Currently Piapro Studio lacks some features of the full V3 editor, but most of these are not needed to work with the vocal composition and tuning of the Vocaloid. Crypton however has mentioned they would like to implement something similar to Job Plugins at some point in the future.

Piapro Studio is also regularly updated every few months with new features and bug fixes. Vocaloid 3 Editor updates appear much less frequently, generally only around the time of release of a new Vocaloid. Piapro Studio also features some Piapro social designed singer icons and vocal preview samples, added in an update in the Summer of 2014.

=== Karent ===
Karent is a record label operated by Crypton Future Media. The label, which specializes in Vocaloid content, publishes albums and songs from musicians across the world.

== Published games ==
In addition to their collaboration with Sega on the Hatsune Miku: Project DIVA series and the Hatsune Miku: Colorful Stage! spin-off, Crypton Future Media also release their own smaller titles for smartphones, VR, and consoles. On Steam, their games are published by Komodo (formerly known as Degica Games).

Year	Title	Platform	Genre
2018	Hatsune Miku VR	Windows (Steam VR)	Rhythm
2019	Hatsune Miku VR	PlayStation VR	Rhythm
2020	Hatsune Miku VR	Oculus Quest 2	Rhythm
2020	Hatsune Miku Logic Paint	Android, iOS	Puzzle (nonogram)
2020	Hatsune Miku Amiguru Jump	Android, iOS	Platformer
2020	Hatsune Miku Amiguru Train	Android, iOS	Puzzle, auto-runner
2021	Hatsune Miku Tycoon	Android, iOS	Cards
2021	Hatsune Miku Logic Paint S	Nintendo Switch	Puzzle (nonogram)
2022	Hatsune Miku Logic Paint S	Windows, Xbox One, Xbox Series X/S	Puzzle (nonogram)
2022	Hatsune Miku Connecting Puzzle Tamagotori	Nintendo Switch	Puzzle (tile-matching)
2022	Hatsune Miku Jigsaw Puzzle	Nintendo Switch, Windows, Xbox One, Xbox Series X/S	Puzzle (jigsaw)
2023	Hatsune Miku: The Planet of Wonder and Fragments of Wishes	Nintendo Switch	Minigame compilation, adventure
2024	Hatsune Miku: The Planet of Wonder and Fragments of Wishes	Windows, Xbox One, Xbox Series X/S	Minigame compilation, adventure
2024	Fitness Boxing feat. Hatsune Miku	Nintendo Switch	Exergame
2025	Hatsune Miku Logic Paint S+	Nintendo Switch, PlayStation 4, PlayStation 5, Windows, Xbox One	Puzzle (nonogram)

== See also ==
- Vocaloid
  - Meiko
  - Kaito
  - Hatsune Miku
  - Kagamine Rin/Len
  - Megurine Luka
- Speech synthesis
- Computer music
- Auto-Tune
