= Vocaloid (software) =

2004 singing voice synthesizer

- Vocaloid on Windows 10
- Release: January 15, 2004; 22 years ago
- Operating system: Microsoft Windows
- Successor: Vocaloid 2
- Available in: English, Japanese
- Type: Voice synthesizer software
- License: Proprietary

Vocaloid (Note: Japanese: VOCΑLOID. (while Yamaha uses the latin alphabet to write the official name, it unofficially uses "ボーカロイド" (Bōkaroido) in katakana within its documentation and press releases in Japanese).) is a singing vocal synthesizer and the first engine released in the Vocaloid series. It was succeeded by Vocaloid 2. This version was made to be able to sing both English and Japanese.

== History ==
The earliest known development related to Vocaloid was a project that had occurred two years prior and funded by Yamaha. The project was codenamed "Elvis" and did not become a product because of the scale of its vocal building required for just a single song. It is credited as the project that established many of the earliest models and ideas that would later be tested and tried for Vocaloid.

Yamaha started development of Vocaloid in March 2000 and announced it for the first time at the German fair Musikmesse on March 5–9, 2003. It was created under the name "Daisy", in reference to the song "Daisy Bell", but for copyright reasons, this name was dropped in favor of "Vocaloid".

The first Vocaloids, Leon and Lola, were released by the studio Zero-G on March 3, 2004, both of which were sold as a "Virtual Soul Vocalist". Leon and Lola made their first appearance at the NAMM Show on January 15, 2004. Leon and Lola were also demonstrated at the Zero-G Limited booth during Wired Nextfest and won the 2005 Electronic Musician Editor's Choice Award. Zero-G later released Miriam, with her voice provided by Miriam Stockley, in July 2004. Later that year, Crypton Future Media also released the first Japanese Vocaloid Meiko who, along with Kaito, was developed by Yamaha. In June 2005, Yamaha upgraded the engine version to 1.1. A patch was later released to update all Vocaloid engines to Vocaloid 1.1.2, adding new features to the software, although there were differences between the output results of the engine. A total of five Vocaloid products were released from 2004 to 2006. Vocaloid was also noted for its more husky results than later engine versions.

Vocaloid had no previous rival technology to contend with at the time of its release, with the English version only having to face the later release of VirSyn's Cantor software during its original run. Despite having Japanese phonetics, the interface lacked a Japanese version and both Japanese and English vocals had an English interface. The only differences between versions were the color and logo that changed per template. As of 2011, this version of the software is no longer supported by Yamaha and will no longer be updated. All Vocaloid 1 products were permanently retired on January 1, 2014.

== Products ==
A total of five products were released for the engine version.

LEON Vocaloid Brand Logo

=== Leon ===
A male vocal released capable of singing in English. He was released on January 15, 2004. He was built as a soul singer. His provider is unknown, save for the fact that he was a "British black singer". Leon, along with his complementary vocal "Lola", were noted for their attempt to convey racial qualities within a vocal, due to their genre choice of "soul music". He was considered the overall weaker of the two soul singer voices and the weakest of the three English vocals.

LOLA Vocaloid Brand Logo

=== Lola ===
A female vocal released as a complementary vocal to Leon, Lola also sings in English. Also released on January 15, 2004. Lola was noted for her deep tone that left her sounding "like Big Ma", but was generally considered the better of the two Soul singers. Nothing is known about her voice provider except she was a black singer who was established in Great Britain, whose roots were noted back in the Caribbean. A notable issue with her voice was that when used outside of genres other than soul, her provider's Caribbean accent would sound out, giving an atypical soul singer result.

Lola is also known to have the oldest Vocaloid works on website Nico Nico Douga out of all Vocaloids. She was also used by Susumu Hirasawa on various tracks for the film Paprika.

=== Miriam ===
Miriam, based on the voice of Miriam Stockley, was the third English vocal released for the engine. Released on July 1, 2004, Miriam was an improvement over Leon and Lola and had a softer toned vocal. She was considered the strongest English vocal released for the engine version.

=== Meiko ===
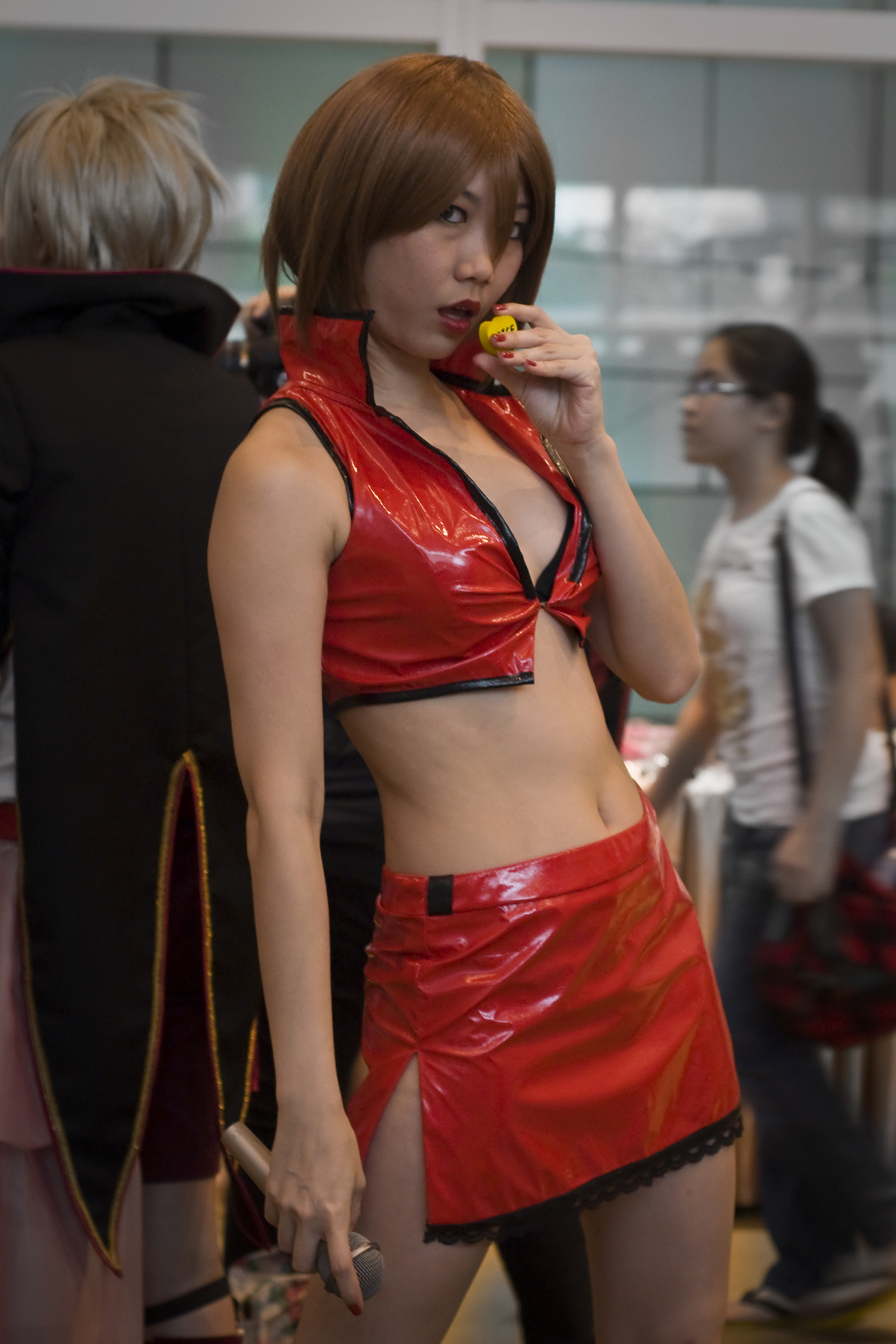
Cosplay of Meiko

Meiko was the first of the two Japanese vocals developed by the company, Yamaha, and has a name that was chosen among two other proposals. She was originally codenamed "Hanako" which likely came from Yamada Hanako (山田花子), a placeholder name for any female characters, and the Japanese equivalent to "Jane Smith". During her development the name "Megumi" was also considered before a final decision was made. The name "Meiko" was ultimately chosen to go along with her voice provider Meiko Haigo. Her commercial handling was done by Crypton Future Media and she was released on November 5, 2004. Meiko was ranked as the seventh most popular Vocaloid product they sold and the least popular of Crypton Future Media's own Vocaloids.

Cosplay of Kaito

=== Kaito ===
A complementary male vocal for Meiko, Kaito was released on February 17, 2006 for the Japanese version of the software. He was developed by Yamaha and was originally codenamed "Taro". Kaito was initially acknowledged as a commercial failure and sold poorly, bringing in only 500 units in contrast to Meiko's 3,000. His lack of sales in contrast to Meiko was put down to the reader demographic of DTM magazine, which 80% were male. Sales picked up suddenly in 2008 to the surprise of Wataru Sasaki and other members of Crypton Future Media and by 2010 had over taken Meiko in popularity.

== Reception ==
Reviewers such as Michael Stipe of R.E.M. praised it when it was first announced in 2003. Stipe noted that one of the more useful aspects of the software was that it gave singers a method of preserving their voice for future use should they lose their own, but as the technology progressed it could also be used to bring back the voices of singers whose voices have already been lost. However, while the provider of "Miriam", Miriam Stockley, had accepted that there was little point in fighting progress, she had noted there was little control over how her voice was used once the software was in the hands of others. At the time of its release, Popular Science reported that, "Synthetic vocals have never even come close to fooling the ear, and outside of certain Kraftwerk chestnuts, robo-crooning is offputting." It was noted that the Vocaloid software was the first to touch the uncanny job of recreating the human voice. Yamaha received much praise and Vocaloid was hailed as a "quantum leap" on vocal synthesis, while Vocaloid itself received much attention and praise within the industry.

Sales of the product were also reported to be very sluggish at first. The CEO of Crypton Future Media noted the lack of interest in Vocaloids overall was put down to the lack of response in the initial Vocaloid software. With regard to the development of the English version of the software specifically, many studios when approached by Crypton Future Media for recommendations towards developing the English Vocaloids had no interest in the software initially, with one particular company representative calling it a "toy". A level of failure was put on Leon and Lola for lack of sales in the United States, putting the blame on their British accents.

Prior to the release of the Hatsune Miku product, Crypton Future Media had also noted there was some criticism at choosing to release the original Vocaloid engine as a commercial licensing product, although felt that the choice was for the better of the engine. Furthermore, it was noted that the original Vocaloid engine felt more like a prototype for future engine versions.
