= Kagamine Rin/Len =

Humanoid personas voiced by a synthesizer software

Kagamine Rin & Kagamine Len

- Kagamine Rin/Len V4X and English bundle (2015)
- Developer: Crypton Future Media
- Release: December 27, 2007; 18 years ago
- Stable release: V4X / December 24, 2015; 10 years ago
- Operating system: Windows
- Platform: PC
- Available in: English, Japanese
- Type: Vocal Synthesizer Application
- License: Commercial proprietary software
- Website: www.crypton.co.jp/mp/pages/prod/vocaloid/rinlenv4x.jsp

Kagamine Rin's voice

Kagamine Len's voice

Kagamine Rin & Len (Japanese: 鏡音リン・レン), officially code-named CV02, are a pair of Vocaloid software voicebanks developed by Crypton Future Media, headquartered in Sapporo, Japan. Their official moe anthropomorphism consists of a pair of singers, a boy and a girl, respectively named Len and Rin. They use Yamaha Corporation's Vocaloid 2 and Vocaloid 4 voice synthesizing technology. Their voices are samples of voice actress Asami Shimoda. They have performed at live concerts together, as they are each other's mirrors.

Their official code name, CV02, refers to their position as the second Vocaloids made by Crypton Future Media for their "Character Vocal Series" (abbreviated "CV Series"), succeeding Hatsune Miku (code-named CV01) and preceding Megurine Luka (code-named CV03). The number 02 can be seen on Rin's left shoulder in official artwork.

== Development ==
Kagamine Rin & Kagamine Len were developed by Crypton Future Media using Yamaha Corporation's Vocaloid 2. Their voices were created by taking vocal samples from voice actress Asami Shimoda at a controlled pitch and tone. They were the second release within the "Character Vocal Series," (abbreviated "CV Series") which included Crypton Future Media's other Vocaloids, Hatsune Miku and Megurine Luka. Initially, only Rin's concept art was made public, and Len was conceptualised subsequently.

They received mixed results from producers because compared to Hatsune Miku, they were considered much harder vocals to use. Asami Shimoda noted that she often received comments from Vocaloid fans that Rin's voice echoes within their heads and makes them feel dizzy, while Len's higher ranges were not favored by those not fond of the pair entirely.

Despite being released as masculine characters, during the development of VY2, the vocals of Ryuto or Kagamine Len were not classified as "masculine vocals" and were not considered capable of holding low masculine tones because of it. As a result, he and Ryuto were not referenced in the development of VY2.

=== Additional software ===
Due to a number of complaints and issues with the original vocal, the "ACT1" package was replaced with the "ACT2" package. This package acted independently from the original package. It addressed issues regarding their ability to vocalize clearly. People who purchased the old version were able to claim the updated disc until 20 September 2008.

In 2010 after Hatsune Miku Append was released for Hatsune Miku, Kagamine Rin & Len Append was released for Rin & Len. Rin's appends are "Power," "Warm," and "Sweet" while Len's appends are "Power," "Cold," and "Serious."

An update, Kagamine Rin/Len V4X, was released for Vocaloid 4 on December 24, 2015. This package contains six Japanese vocals, three for Rin and three for Len. They are updated on the old Append vocals from Vocaloid 2. Rin's vocals are "Power E.V.E.C.," "Warm" and "Sweet" while Len's are "Power E.V.E.C.", "Cold" and "Serious." Enhanced Voice Expression Control (E.V.E.C.) is a new system developed for Piapro Studio which allows delicate changes to how phonemes sound. There are two options for the E.V.E.C. vocals: "Power" and "Soft." All Rin and Len vocals can use the new Cross-Synthesis (XSY) system developed for Vocaloid 4, though are limited to only being able to do so with other vocals of their assigned characters of "Rin" or "Len". Rin and Len each received an English vocal which was released on the same day as the Japanese vocal. These vocals are available separately as a download or as a bundle with Japanese vocals.

== Marketing ==
20,000 copies were sold on initial release. The Kagamine Append package was released and went straight to fifth place in December 2010, the day of their release.

== Characteristics ==
During development, Crypton's initial concept was to make a pair of female and male vocals. The first idea of this concept was twin voices of a girl and her mirror image of opposite gender. Crypton Future Media had the intention to distribute them as twins, but this idea was not adopted and their relationship was left unconfirmed. Despite this, many had seen the Kagamines as twin siblings, due to their similarities found in their appearance.

After seeing many works that depict their relationships differently, Crypton announced on a magazine interview that those would meet their ideal. Crypton's final announcement was that they are neither siblings nor lovers. Popular songs featuring them are just as likely to feature them as siblings as they are as lovers. Examples of this variance include Mothy's "Evillious Chronicles" series (where they are depicted as being multiple sets of siblings, often twins), as well as Hitoshizuku-P x Yama's "Feathers Across the Seasons" (where they are depicted as an adult married couple). Both have been featured in official media; Evillious Chronicles was featured at Mikupa 2011 in Sapporo while Feathers Across the Seasons was featured in Miku Symphony 2018–2019.

Merchandise companies such as Goodsmile will use "twin" in their description of the characters on some products or not use the descriptor in other products. Crypton's official website advertises the two as "powerful and charming twin vocals". The reference is in the vocals however, and not the characters themselves.

During Vocaloid 2 Append production, Wataru Sasaki described them as having one soul between the two of them, having only one append shared, POWER.

For their appends, Wataru wanted them to have a sense of transparency with their design. In clarification to what he meant by this, he stated the "transparency" was in reference to their hearts.

For the V4x design, Rin was given a more silver/whiter look to make her appearance more refreshing. The design also was based more on the EOS B700 rather than the Kx5 because of its more whiter appearance. More synthesizer base music symbols were used in addition.

=== Rin ===
Age	14
Birthday	December 27
Height	152 cm (5 ft 0 in)
Weight	43 kg (95 lb)

Append	Suggested tempo	Suggested vocal range
ACT2	85-175BPM	F♯3-C♯5
Power	65-170BPM	F3-B4
Warm	60-160BPM	F3-B4
Sweet	55-155BPM	G3-C5

V4X	Suggested tempo	Suggested vocal range
Power	50-170BPM	F2-E4
Warm	50-160BPM	F2-C4
Sweet	55-155BPM	G2-D4
English	55-155BPM	G2-B3

=== Len ===
Age	14
Birthday	December 27
Height	156 cm (5 ft 1 in)
Weight	47 kg (104 lb)

Append	Suggested tempo	Suggested vocal range
ACT2	70-160BPM	D3-C♯5
Power	65-170BPM	A2-D4
Cold	60-160BPM	B2-C4
Serious	55-155BPM	A2-C4

V4X	Suggested tempo	Suggested vocal range
Power	60-170BPM	D2-D4
Cold	60-160BPM	E2-C4
Serious	55-155BPM	F2-C4
English	55-155BPM	E2-G#3
