= Chir, Iran =

Chir or Chiyar (Persian: چير) may refer to:

- Chir, Bavanat, Fars Province
- Chir, Mamasani, Fars Province
- Chir, Kohgiluyeh and Boyer-Ahmad
- Chir, West Azerbaijan
- Chir, Urmia, West Azerbaijan Province
- Chiyar, Zanjan
- Chir, alternate name of Chavor, Zanjan Province
