= Chir =

Chir or CHIR may refer to:

== Places ==
=== Algeria ===
- Chir, Algeria

=== Iran ===
- Chir, Bavanat, Fars
- Chir, Mamasani, Fars
- Chir, Kohgiluyeh and Boyer-Ahmad
- Chir, West Azerbaijan
- Chavor, Zanjan Province, also known as Chīr
- Cher, Iran, also known as Chīr

=== Russia ===
- Chir (river), a tributary of the Don in Russia

== Species ==
- Chir pine (Pinus roxburghii), a species of pine tree in the Himalayas
- Broad whitefish (Coregonus nasus), also known as Chir, a species of freshwater whitefish in the arctic and subarctic regions of Russia, United States, and Canada

== Other uses ==
- CHIR, the former call sign of Canadian radio station CHYR-FM
- Chir Batti, a ghost light reported in the Banni grasslands near the India–Pakistan border

== See also ==
- Chic (disambiguation)
- Chik (disambiguation)
- Chira (disambiguation)
