= Chira =

Chira may refer to:

- Chira (spider), a genus of spiders
- Chira language, an extinct Catacaoan language of the Piura Region of Peru
- Can de Chira, a dog originated from Aragon, Spain
- Flattened rice, a type of jolpan in Indian cuisine

== Places ==
- Chira, Lebanon, a village in Koura District
- Chira County, a county in Hotan, Xinjiang, China
- Chira Island, Costa Rican Pacific island located at the upper end of the Gulf of Nicoya
- Chira River, a river in northern Peru
- Sreeraman Chira, a fresh water lake in Kerala state in India

== People ==
- Alexander Chira (1897–1983), bishop of the Ruthenian Catholic Church
- Susan Chira, American journalist
- Chira Apostol (born 1960), former Romanian rower
- Chira Prabandhayodhin (born 1939), Thai former sports shooter
- Chira Ratanarat (born 1940), chief executive officer of The Siam Chemicals Public Company

== See also ==
- Río Chira (disambiguation)
- Chiras (disambiguation)
- Chirui River (disambiguation)
- Chir (disambiguation)
