= Chin (disambiguation) =

The chin is the lowermost part of the human face.

- Double chin, an extra layer of fat that protrudes from underneath the chin
- Cleft chin, a chin with a dimple in the center
- Chin-up, a strength training exercise
- Chin (combat sports), "a good chin", a fighter's ability to tolerate hard punches to the face without being knocked out
- Chinface, a comical performance where eyes are drawn on the chin and it is filmed upside-down

Chin may also refer to:

== China ==
- Jin (disambiguation), romanized as Chin in Wade–Giles
- Qin (disambiguation), romanized as Ch'in in Wade–Giles

== Myanmar ==
- Chin State, a state in Myanmar
- Chin people, the name of an ethnic group living in Myanmar, India and Bangladesh
- Chin languages, family of Tibeto-Burman languages

== Personal names ==
- Chinn, or Chin, English surname
- Chin (surname), an alternate spelling for several East Asian surnames of Chinese origin:
  - Qin (surname)
  - Jin (Chinese surname)
  - Qian (surname)
  - Chen (surname)
- Vincent Gigante (1928–2005), a notorious mafioso, often referred to by his nickname "Chin"
- Chinawut Indracusin (born 1989), also known as "Chin", a Thai-French singer

== Fictional characters ==
- The Crimson Chin, in the animated series The Fairly OddParents
- Chin Gentsai, in the video game series King of Fighters
- Chin the Conqueror, in the animated series Avatar: The Last Airbender
- Grace Chin
- Chin, in the video game Hong Kong 97

== Geography ==
- Chin, alternative name of China
- Chin, Alberta, a small hamlet in Canada
- Chin, Iran, a village in Chaharmahal and Bakhtiari Province, Iran
- Chin, Zanjan, a village in Zanjan Province, Iran
- Chin Rural District, in Kohgiluyeh and Boyer-Ahmad Province, Iran

== Other ==
- Transliteration variant of the Chinese "Jin"
  - Chin dynasty (disambiguation)
- Chin (Mayan god), a god in Mayan mythology
- Chinovnik, a rank given to a civil servant in Imperial Russia; the same term also refers to Euchologion, the liturgical book used by a bishop
- Japanese Chin, a dog breed

== See also ==
- Chic (disambiguation)
- Chik (disambiguation)
- Qin (disambiguation)
- CHIN (disambiguation)
- China (disambiguation)
- Shin (disambiguation)
