= Chic (disambiguation) =

Chic means fashionably "stylish" or "smart".

Chic may also refer to:

== Arts and entertainment ==
=== Magazines ===
- Chic (1980s magazine), a defunct British monthly magazine aimed at young black women established in 1984
- Chic (pornographic magazine), a defunct pornographic magazine started by Larry Flynt in 1976

=== Music ===
- Chic (band), an American disco and funk music group
  - Chic (album), the 1977 debut album of the band
- Chic Chocolate (1916–1967), stage name of Goan trumpeter and composer Antonio Xavier Vaz

=== Other arts and entertainment ===
- Chic!, a 2015 French romantic comedy film
- CHIC-FM, a Canadian radio station in Quebec
- CHIC, former callsign (1960–1977) of CIAO (AM), a Canadian radio station in Ontario

== Other uses ==
- Chic (nickname), nickname for people named Charles
- Chic (automobile), an automobile manufactured in Australia in the early 1920s
- Chic (horse), a thoroughbred racehorse
- Cooking and Hospitality Institute of Chicago

== See also ==
- Chi (disambiguation)
- CHI (disambiguation)
- Chia (disambiguation)
- Chica (disambiguation)
- Chick (disambiguation)
- Chico (disambiguation)
- Chik (disambiguation)
- Chin (disambiguation)
- Chip (disambiguation)
- Chir (disambiguation)
- Chiu (disambiguation)
