= CHI =

The initialism CHI may refer to:

== Health ==
- Catholic Health Initiatives, a hospital network in the United States
- Child Health International, UK-based charity
- Children's Health Ireland, governs paediatric hospitals in Ireland
- Commission for Health Improvement, former UK body
- Community Health Index, Scotland
- Comprehensive health insurance
- Congenital hyperinsulinism, a genetic medical condition that causes the overproduction of insulin in newborns, abbreviated as HI or CHI
- Creatinine height ratio, estimating protein in body composition

== Places & Sports Teams ==
- An abbreviation for the U.S. city of Chicago, Illinois and its major professional sports teams
  - Chicago Bears of the National Football League
  - Chicago Blackhawks of the National Hockey League
  - Chicago Bulls of the National Basketball Association
  - Chicago Cubs, also CHC, of Major League Baseball
  - Chicago Fire of Major League Soccer
  - Chicago White Sox, also CWS, of Major League Baseball
- Chile (in sports: IOC and FIFA code CHI)
- Channel Islands, a UK dependency (Chapman code: CHI)

== Science and technology ==
- Carvill Hurricane Index
- Computer–human interaction or human–computer interaction
  - CHI (conference)
- CHI (compiler), an Intel C compiler for heterogeneous integration
- Calinski–Harabasz index, a metric for evaluating clustering algorithms
- Hyperbolic cosine integral, in trigonometry

== Transit ==
- Chingford railway station, United Kingdom — railway station code
- IATA code for all Chicago airports
- Chicago Union Station (Amtrak code)
- Chiltern railway station, Australia

== Other ==
- Chichester and Harbour Independents, a minor British political party (Chichester, England)
- Columbia Helicopters, an American aircraft manufacturer
- CHI, one of Longwood University § Secret societies (Virginia, USA)
- Cationic Hydration Interlink, a hair-care brand owned by Farouk Systems (founded by Farouk Shami).

== See also ==
- Chi (disambiguation)
- Chic (disambiguation)
- Chik (disambiguation)
