= Chiclet (disambiguation) =

Chiclets is a brand of candy-coated chewing gum.

Chiclet or Chiclets can also refer to:

- Chiclets (film), a 2024 Indian teen drama film
- Chiclet keyboard, characterized by small keys that resemble Chiclets

== See also ==
- Chick (disambiguation)
- Chick lit, a genre of contemporary fiction targeted at younger women
- Chicle, a gum from Manilkara trees
- Chicklet, a Canadian musical group
- Chicklet, a small or young chick
