= Sethubandhanam at Sreeraman Chira Chemmappilly =

Hindu ceremony

Coordinates: 10.427°N 76.118°E

Sethubandhanam at Sreeraman Chira or Chira kettal is a Hindu ceremony reminiscent of the Sethubandhanam where Hanuman and his army built Rama Setu to reach Sri Lanka and rescue Sita from the Rakshasa king, Ravana. It is held annually on Thiruvonam day of the Malayalam month of Kanni (September - October) in every year.conducted at Sreeraman Chira, a field in Chemmappilly in the Thrissur district of Kerala state in India.
