= Aneswaram Siva Temple =

Hindu temple in Thrissur, Kerala, India

Coordinates: 10°25′53″N 76°06′52″E

Aneswaram Siva temple is at Chemmappilly, Thrissur, Kerala, India. Its main deity is Shiva.
