= Chik =

Chik may refer to:

- Chik (community), Muslim community in India
- Chik (urban-type settlement), urban-type settlement in Novosibirsk Oblast, Russia
- Chik, Iran, village in South Khorasan Province, Iran
- Chik (name)
- CHIK-FM, French-language radio station located in Quebec City, Quebec, Canada

== See also ==
- Chi (disambiguation)
- CHI (disambiguation)
- Chia (disambiguation)
- Chick (disambiguation)
- Chin (disambiguation)
- Chink (disambiguation)
- Chip (disambiguation)
- Chir (disambiguation)
- Chiu (disambiguation)
