= Chick =

Chick or Chicks may refer to:

== Common meanings ==
- Chick (young bird), a bird that has not yet reached adulthood
- Chick, a young chicken
- Chick, slang for a young woman

== People and fictional characters ==
- Chick (nickname), a list of people and fictional characters
- Chick (surname), various people
- Chick Corea, stage name of a musician and band leader
- Chick Hicks, a character from the Pixar franchise Cars
- Chick McGee, stage name of radio personality Charles Dean Hayes (born 1957)

== Places ==
- Chick Island, in Lake Erie, Canada
- Chick Springs, Taylors, South Carolina, United States, a mineral spring

== Arts, entertainment, and media ==
=== Films ===
- Chick (1928 film), a British film
- Chick (1936 film), a British film
- Les Nanas (The Chicks), a 1985 French comedy film

=== Music ===
- The Chicks, the current name of the band formerly known as the Dixie Chicks
- The Chicks (duo), a New Zealand singing sibling duo, active in the 1960s
- Chick, an alternative rock music project led by Mariah Carey
- "Chick", a song by Brockhampton

=== Other ===
- Chick (novel), a 1923 novel by Edgar Wallace
- Chick, a Dutch pornographic magazine published by Joop Wilhelmus
- "Chicks", an episode of the television series Teletubbies

== Baseball teams ==
- Grand Rapids Chicks, a part of the All-American Girls Professional Baseball League from 1945 to 1954
- Lancaster Red Roses, formerly named the Lancaster Chicks in 1894–1895, based in Lancaster, Pennsylvania
- Memphis Chicks (Southern Association), a former minor league team in Memphis, Tennessee, from 1901 to 1960
- Memphis Chicks (Southern League), a former minor league team in Memphis, Tennessee, from 1978 to 1997
- Milwaukee Chicks, an All-American Girls Professional Baseball League team in 1944
- Sumter Chicks, a former minor league team in Sumter, South Carolina

== Other uses ==
- Chick's Deli, a deli located in Cherry Hill, New Jersey, United States

== See also ==
- Chic (disambiguation)
- Chica (disambiguation)
- Chik (disambiguation)
