= Southern Bleachery and Print Works =

- U.S. National Register of Historic Places
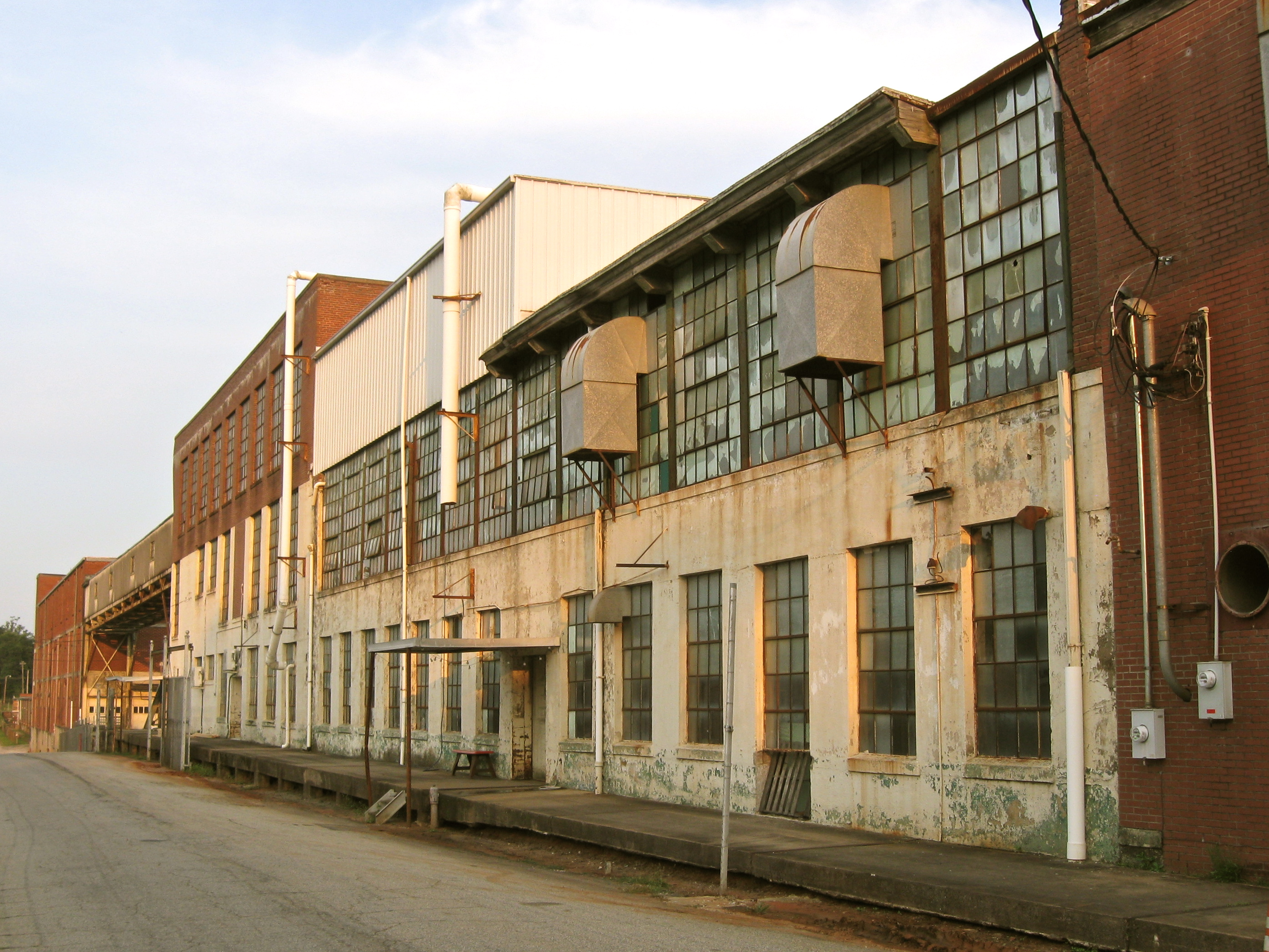
- Southern Bleachery and Print Works, August 2014

- Location within South Carolina Location within the United States
- Location: 113 Mill St., Taylors, South Carolina
- Coordinates: 34°55′12″N 82°17′21″W
- Area: 31.5 acres (12.7 ha)
- Built: 1924-1952
- Architect: J.E. Sirrine Company
- NRHP reference No.: 12000439
- Added to NRHP: July 25, 2012

Southern Bleachery and Print Works is a historic factory building in Taylors, Greenville County, South Carolina. Founded by former Furman University English professor Bennette Geer (who was operating under the aegis of James Buchanan Duke), and built by the J. E. Sirrine Company of Greenville, the mill operated between 1924 and 1965, with the last historic structure being built in 1952. The property consists of 15 contributing resources, including a main building, warehouses, a smokestack, a detached boiler room with smokestack, a filtration plant, and two ponds. The bleachery acquired unfinished goods produced by other textile mills and converted them by bleaching, dyeing, and finishing into material used to manufacture clothing and other items. A small mill village, including Baptist and Methodist churches, was established nearby, and many mill houses continued to exist into the 21st century.

There are about 827,000 square feet of interior space, and although after closure of the mill in 1965, a few businesses operated from the facility, no major company ever again used its "cavernous halls." In 2015, the main portion of the structure was purchased by Taylors Mill Development, LLP, and space was leased to artists and craftsmen as well as to a restaurant, a brewery, and a bar. The property was listed on the National Register of Historic Places in 2012.

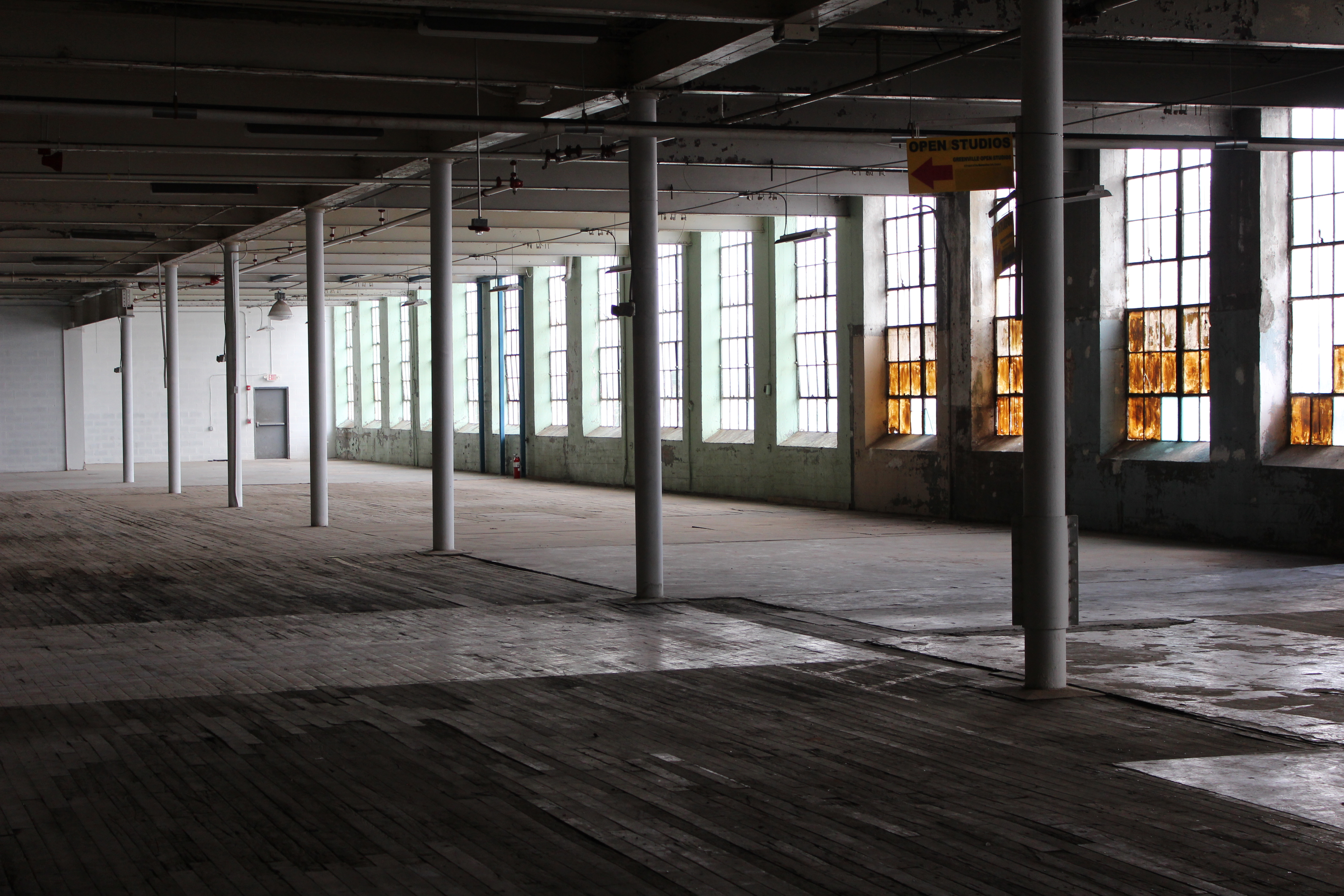
Interior space, 2018
