= CHIN =

CHIN may refer to:

- Canadian Heritage Information Network, a government agency in Canada that promotes Canadian culture and heritage on the Internet
- CHIN Radio/TV International, a media company based in Toronto, Ontario, Canada
- CHIN (AM), a radio station (1540 AM) licensed to Toronto, Ontario, Canada
- CHIN-FM, a radio station (100.7 FM) licensed to Toronto, Ontario, Canada

== See also ==
- Chin (disambiguation)

These meanings are distinct from the word chin.
