= Sreeraman Chira =

Fresh water lake in Kerala, India

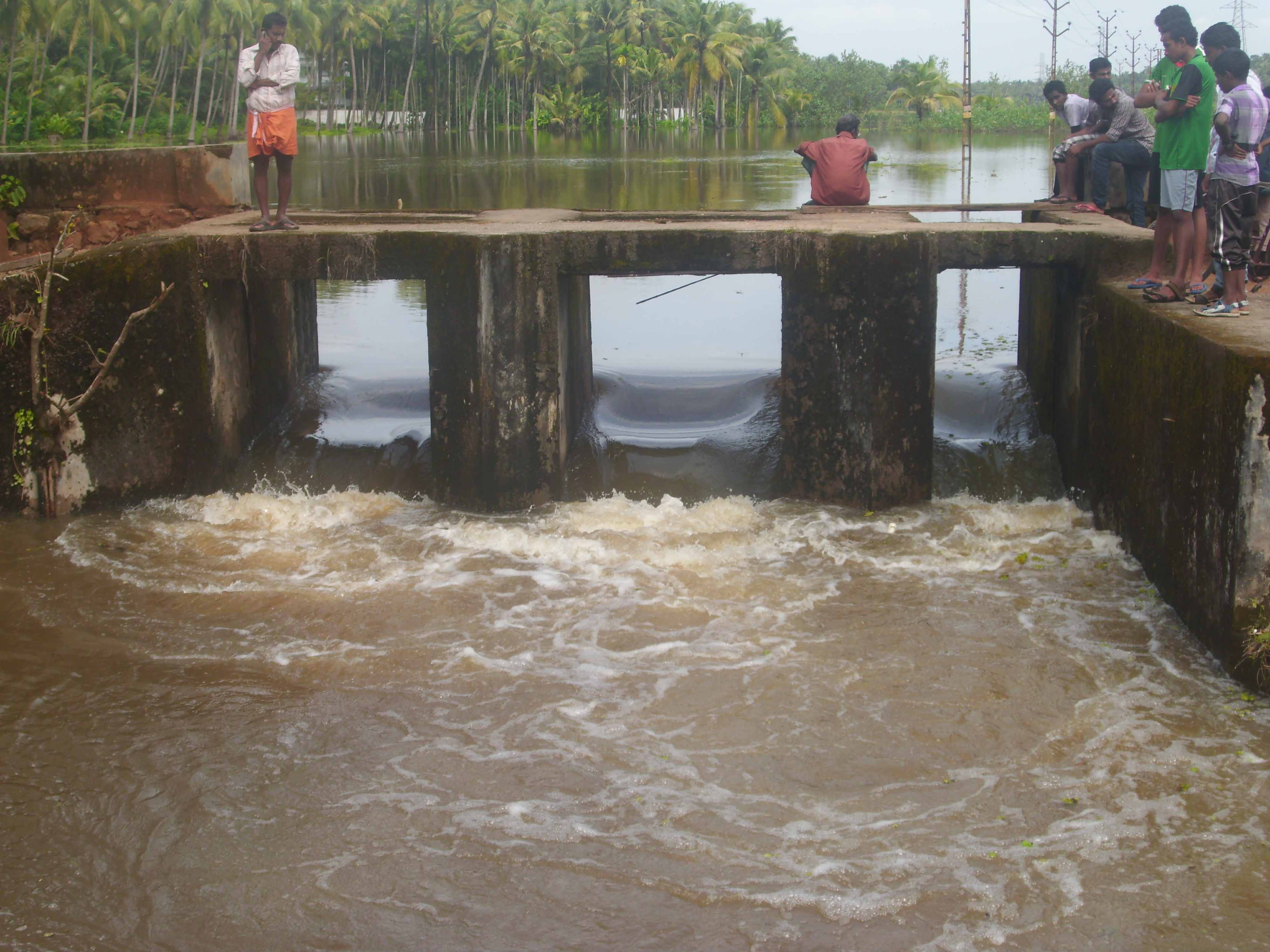
- A view of Sreeraman Chira

- Location within Kerala Location within India
- Location: Triprayar, Thrissur, Kerala
- Coordinates: 10°25′37″N 76°07′05″E
- Type: Pond
- Basin countries: India
- Surface area: 900 acres (360 ha)

Sreeraman Chira is a fresh water lake which contains 900 hectares of paddy fields situated in Chemmappilly near Triprayar of Thrissur district of Kerala state in India. The lake is linked to the Ramayana, where the Chira kettal ceremony reminiscent of the Sethubandhanam where Hanuman and his army built Rama Setu to reach Sri Lanka and rescue Sita from the Rakshasa King, Ravana.
