= Chinface =

Performance involving a person's chin

A chinface, sometimes referred to as a chinikin, chinhead, chinman, or chinmonster is a performance, usually of a comical nature, involving someone's chin. By drawing or attaching eyes, it gives the impression of a distorted face when viewed upside down.

== Origins ==
Physicist Robert W. Wood claimed that he invented this illusion (which he did not name) while a graduate student at Johns Hopkins University in Baltimore in 1891–92:

Lying on the floor one evening and watching the inverted face of one of the graduate students who was talking while standing up, I was intrigued by the ludicrous expressions of the talking mouth when viewed upside down. In my imagination I pictured eyes and nose on the chin to complete a small face engaged in animated conversation. It was screamingly funny, and I at once got out my water colors and painted the eyes and nose in the proper position with respect to the mouth, laid a mirror flat on a table, seated myself before it, and covered the upper part of my face with a black veil, transparent enough to see through. By holding a mirror in my hand well out in front of me, I could see the reflected image of the little face right side up in the large mirror, and I recited Jabberwocky with many grimaces to observe the effect. It was a great success, and had been exhibited on many occasions to small but enthusiastic audiences seated in front of the mirror.

Later Wood came up with a way to project the image onto a cloth dummy. He said that [Florence] Ziegfeld talked to him about using it (presumably for his Follies).

In the early 1950s ventriloquist Paul Winchell created a chin face character named Oswald.

== Popular culture ==
In 1964, Bob Denver performed a chin face in the beach party film, For Those Who Think Young.

In 1988, McEwans Lager launched a new TV ad campaign featuring 'The Chinheads', a fictional and quirky 'upside-down' rock/soul band. The award-winning TV advert was directed by Steve Barron (director of Michael Jackson's "Billie Jean", A-Ha's "Take On Me", and Teenage Mutant Ninja Turtles) and featured the track "Something So Real" by Scottish band, The Love Decree.

In 1989, a single was subsequently released and charted nationally, peaking at No.61 (No.1, Outselling Black Box's "Ride On Time" in Scotland). The Love Decree were: Robin Gow (Keyboards/Songwriter), Grant Macintosh (Vocals/Songwriter) and Gordon Gow (Percussion). The track 'Something So Real" was produced by Robin Gow.

The 'Chinheads' TV Ad can be viewed Here

Ben Elton's 1990 television show The Man from Auntie featured several chinface performances.

In 1993, an episode of Red Dwarf, "Gunmen of the Apocalypse", Lister used a chinface when the crew had to convince a ship of simulants (artificially created, cyborg humanoids) that there were no humans aboard, insisting instead that the ship was crewed by curry-based lifeforms known as "Vindaloovians".

Since video hosting sites have become available on the internet, chinface videos have become increasingly common.

In the mid-1990s, Kraft Canada released TV ads for Kraft Dinner featuring various people performing chinfaces and eating the product.

The video game You Don't Know Jack featured as an ending to Volume 4 (The Ride) footage showing part of the hosts' faces. The character Guy Towers is portrayed as a chin face, with oversized glasses.

Disc 4 of the Jackass DVD Box Set features Chris Pontius performing a chinface of a "Latvian Gangster" during a running of the Gumball 3000.

They Might Be Giants' first video, for their song "Put Your Hand Inside the Puppet Head," features one of them doing the chinface, with a xeroxed picture of his eyes placed on his chin.

In the video for Weird Al Yankovic's style-parody of Devo, his band is shown several times as chinfaces wearing Devo's yellow tyvek suits.

In the Atomic Brain episode of Mystery Science Theater 3000, Mike Nelson demonstrates to the 'bots a "chin face". He says that the tradition is "fun...whimsical"; Crow counters that it is "odd and disturbing".

In The Nanny, Fran and Gracie enter a Mother-Daughter beauty pageant, for the talent competition both sang a song as chin faces.

In the popular French film Amélie, the main character is shown in a scene performing chinface.

In The Amazing World of Gumball, one of Gumball's classmates, Sussie, is a chin face puppet, as are her parents. She is known for her erratic and strange personality.

In Jackass 3D, Chris Pontius performs a chinface of a barbarian as part of the stunt "Pontius the barbarian"

In the 1950s, television ventriloquist Paul Winchell featured a chin face character named Ozwald on his Paul Winchell and Jerry Mahoney show. In 1961, Berwin Novelties introduced a home version of the character with a "body," pencils for drawing eyes, and a "magic mirror" that turned the image upside down.

== See also ==
- Puppets
- Acting
- Comedy
