= Taylors, South Carolina =

- CDP
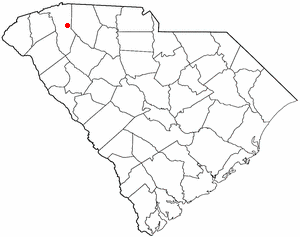
- Location of Taylors, South Carolina
- Coordinates: 34°54′48″N 82°18′39″W
- Country: United States
- State: South Carolina
- County: Greenville

Government
  - Type: Town Administrator

Area
  - Total: 10.60 sq mi (27.46 km^{2})
  - Land: 10.56 sq mi (27.35 km^{2})
  - Water: 0.039 sq mi (0.10 km^{2})
- Elevation: 925 ft (282 m)

Population (2020)
  - Total: 23,222
  - Density: 2,198.8/sq mi (848.98/km^{2})
- Time zone: UTC−5 (Eastern (EST))
  - Summer (DST): UTC−4 (EDT)
- ZIP code: 29687
- Area codes: 864, 821
- FIPS code: 45-71395
- GNIS feature ID: 2402918

Taylors is a census-designated place (CDP) in Greenville County, South Carolina, United States. The population was 23,222 at the 2020 census. It is part of the Greenville-Mauldin-Easley metropolitan area.

== History ==
The Southern Bleachery and Print Works, now known as the Taylors Mill, was listed on the National Register of Historic Places in 2012.

== Geography ==
The Enoree River flows through the community, and during the late nineteenth and early twentieth centuries, Chick Springs served as the focus of a small Upstate South Carolina resort community.

According to the United States Census Bureau, the CDP has a total area of 10.9 square miles (28 km^{2}), all land.

== Demographics ==
Historical population
Census	Pop.	Note	%±
1950	1,518		—
1960	1,071		−29.4%
1970	6,831		537.8%
1980	15,801		131.3%
1990	19,619		24.2%
2000	20,125		2.6%
2010	21,617		7.4%
2020	23,222		7.4%
U.S. Decennial Census

=== 2020 census ===
As of the 2020 census, Taylors had a population of 23,222, 9,326 households, and 5,844 families; the median age was 38.1 years. 23.1% of residents were under the age of 18 and 17.9% were 65 years of age or older. For every 100 females there were 92.6 males, and for every 100 females age 18 and over there were 88.6 males age 18 and over.

100.0% of residents lived in urban areas, while 0.0% lived in rural areas.

There were 9,326 households in Taylors, of which 31.4% had children under the age of 18 living in them. Of all households, 48.9% were married-couple households, 16.4% were households with a male householder and no spouse or partner present, and 28.9% were households with a female householder and no spouse or partner present. About 26.3% of all households were made up of individuals and 10.5% had someone living alone who was 65 years of age or older.

There were 9,826 housing units, of which 5.1% were vacant. The homeowner vacancy rate was 1.2% and the rental vacancy rate was 7.1%.

Racial composition as of the 2020 census
Race	Number	Percent
White	16,204	69.8%
Black or African American	2,909	12.5%
American Indian and Alaska Native	104	0.4%
Asian	893	3.8%
Native Hawaiian and Other Pacific Islander	7	0.0%
Some other race	1,414	6.1%
Two or more races	1,691	7.3%
Hispanic or Latino (of any race)	2,682	11.5%

=== 2010 census ===
As of the census of 2010, there were 21,617 people, 7,978 households, and 5,720 families living in the CDP. The population density was 1,853.7 inhabitants per square mile (715.7/km^{2}). There were 8,550 housing units at an average density of 787.5 per square mile (304.1/km^{2}). The racial makeup of the CDP was 81.59% White, 14.19% African American, 0.24% Native American, 1.52% Asian, 0.03% Pacific Islander, 1.11% from other races, and 1.31% from two or more races. Hispanic or Latino of any race were 2.91% of the population.

There were 7,978 households, out of which 34.3% had children under the age of 18 living with them, 56.4% were married couples living together, 12.5% had a female householder with no husband present, and 28.3% were non-families. 23.4% of all households were made up of individuals, and 6.2% had someone living alone who was 65 years of age or older. The average household size was 2.52 and the average family size was 2.98.

In the CDP, the population was spread out, with 25.7% under the age of 18, 8.4% from 18 to 24, 31.5% from 25 to 44, 24.0% from 45 to 64, and 10.4% who were 65 years of age or older. The median age was 36 years. For every 100 females, there were 93.8 males. For every 100 females age 18 and over, there were 89.4 males.

The median income for a household in the CDP was $46,986, and the median income for a family was $55,241. Males had a median income of $39,458 versus $28,057 for females. The per capita income for the CDP was $21,463. About 6.8% of families and 8.0% of the population were below the poverty line, including 11.2% of those under age 18 and 6.6% of those age 65 or over.

== Economy ==
Taylors was the global headquarters for Fatz, a fast casual Southern food restaurant with 43 locations. All Fatz locations shut down in 2023.

The Foundations Baptist Fellowship International, an affiliation of Independent Baptist individuals (not churches), is also based in Taylors.

== Arts and culture ==
Taylors has a public library, a branch of the Greenville County Library System.

== Education ==
- Eastside High School
