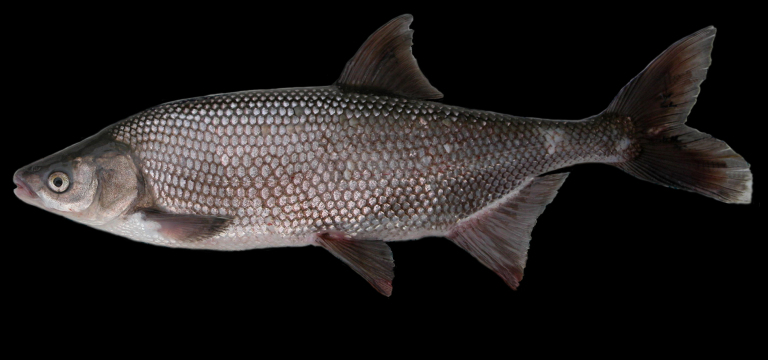

Conservation status
- Least Concern (IUCN 3.1)

- Apparently Secure (NatureServe)

Scientific classification
- Kingdom: Animalia
- Phylum: Chordata
- Class: Actinopterygii
- Order: Cypriniformes
- Family: Leuciscidae
- Subfamily: Laviniinae
- Genus: Lavinia; Girard, 1854
- Species: L. exilicauda

Binomial name
- Lavinia exilicauda S. F. Baird & Girard, 1854
- Lavinia exilicauda natural range, USGS, 2004

Synonyms
- Lavinia compressa Ayres, 1854; Leucosomus occidentalis Baird & Girard, 1854; Lavinia harengus Girard, 1856; Lavinia ardesiaca Snyder, 1913; Lavinia exilicauda chi Hopkirk, 1974

= Lavinia exilicauda =

Lavinia exilicauda Temporal range: Middle Miocene to present

Apecies of fishes

Lavinia exilicauda, the hitch, is a species of freshwater ray-finned fish belonging to the family Leuciscidae, which includes the daces, chubs, Eurasian minnows and related fishes. This species is endemic to central California, and was once very common. The common name may derive from a Pomoan word for this species. (Note: According to Hopkirk (1988), the Pomoan word hitch refers to the Clear Lake splittail (Pogonichthys ciscoides)) It is the only species in the monospecific genus Lavinia.

== Taxonomy ==
Lavinia exilicauda was first formally described in 1854 by Spencer Fullerton Baird and Charles Frédéric Girard with its type locality given as the Sacramento River in California. While the hitch is closely related to the California roach (Hesperoleucus symmetricus), and the two species can hybridize, leading some authorities to place H. symmetricus in Lavinia, genomic data appear to support the fishes' separate lineages. This taxon is classified in the subfamily Laviniinae, the "Western chubs", of the family Leuciscidae.

Three distinct population segments (DPS) or subspecies of the hitch are recognized:

- Clear Lake hitch (chi in Pomoan language)
- Monterey hitch (Salinas hitch, Pajaro hitch)
- Sacramento hitch (Central Valley hitch)

These common names or DPS correspond to the subspecies Lavinia exilicauda chi Hopkirk, 1974, Lavinia exilicauda harengus Girard, 1856 and Lavinia exilicauda exilicauda Baird and Girard in Girard, 1854, respectively.

The hitch is the only extant member of Lavinia, but two fossil species are also known from the Interior West, both from well-preserved specimens. †Lavinia lugaskii Kelly, 2010 has been described from multiple complete skeletons recovered from the Middle Miocene-aged Aldrich Station Formation of Nevada. †Lavinia stuwilliamsi McClellan & Smith, 2020 is known from multiple complete skeletons from the Late Miocene-aged Salt Lake Formation of Utah.

== Description ==
Lavinia exilicauda has a deep and laterally compressed body, with a small head, and a terminal mouth pointing upwards. They are generally silver all over; younger fish have a black spot at the base of the tail, losing it as they age, and becoming generally darker as well. The anal fin is noticeably longer than for other California minnows, with 11–14 rays, while the dorsal fin has 10–13 rays, and is placed further back, the base being positioned between pelvic and anal fins. The tail fin is large and deeply forked. They can get large for minnows, with lengths of up to 36 centimetres (14 in) total length. All of these features make them look much like the golden shiner. The hitch is closely related to the California roach (Hesperoleucus symmetricus complex), and these taxa can hybridize with each other.

Hitch are omnivores of the open water, eating a combination of filamentous algae, insects, and zooplankton. They can be found in lakes, sloughs, and slow-moving sections of rivers and streams. With the highest temperature tolerance among the native fish of the Central Valley, they can be found in both warm and cool water; they also have considerable salt tolerance, for instance occurring in Suisun Marsh (7–8 ppt salinity), and Salinas River lagoon (9 ppt).

== Distribution ==
Lavinia exilicauda has a range which includes the Sacramento River–San Joaquin River System of the Central Valley, the Russian River, Clear Lake, Pajaro River, and Salinas River. Although once abundant, but no longer commercially fished in Clear Lake, populations have been declining. The most likely cause appears to be loss of springtime spawning water flows due to water diversion and damming.

== Conservation ==
The Clear Lake hitch was listed as threatened under the California Endangered Species Act in 2014.
