= Ben Elton: The Man from Auntie =

- Genre: Comedy
- Written by: Ben Elton
- Directed by: John Burrows
- Presented by: Ben Elton
- Country of origin: United Kingdom
- Original language: English
- No. of series: 2
- No. of episodes: 12

Production
- Producer: Geoffrey Perkins
- Running time: 30 mins

Original release
- Network: BBC1
- Release: 15 February 1990 – 10 March 1994

Ben Elton: The Man from Auntie is a British television comedy series written and performed by Ben Elton. The title of the series was a play on words of the American spy series The Man from U.N.C.L.E., and "Auntie", an informal name for the BBC.

The first series aired on BBC1 in 1990. A second series with a slightly different format was aired four years later in 1994.

The series was primarily based on Elton's stand-up comedy routines, with his monologues interspersed with occasional filmed sketches and parodies, as well as soundbites from chinface "potato heads". Another regular segment were "Farties' Guides" to such tasks as catching a train or setting up home—Elton described "Farties" as "you and me"—ordinary people endeavouring to make it through life despite the efforts of entities such as the "body conspiracy" and the Ministry of Crap Design.

== Series overview ==
Series	Episodes	Originally released	
Series	Episodes	First released	Last released
1	6	15 February 1990	22 March 1990
2	6	27 January 1994	10 March 1994
