= Chiras =

Chiras may refer to:

- Chiras, Afghanistan, a major village and valley in northern Afghanistan
- Mihaela Chiras (born 1984), Romanian luger

== See also ==
- Chira (disambiguation)
