= Chi =

Chi may refer to:

== Greek ==
- Chi (letter) (Χ or χ), the twenty-second letter of the Greek alphabet

== Chinese ==
- Chi (length) (尺), a traditional unit of length, about a third of a meter
- Chi (mythology) (螭), a dragon
- Chi (surname) (池, pinyin: chí)
- Ch'i or qi (氣), "energy force"
- Chinese language (ISO 639-2 code "chi")
- Ji (surname), various surnames written Chi in Wade–Giles

== Japanese ==
- Chi (kana), (hiragana ち, katakana チ)

== Igbo ==
- Chi (spirit), a personal guardian deity (Chukwu)
- Chi (daylight), as in daybreak (chi obibo) or sunset (chi ojiji)

== Arts and entertainment ==
- Chi (2013 film), a Canadian documentary film
- Chi (2019 film), a Burmese drama film
- Chi: On the Movements of the Earth, a manga series by Uoto
- The Chi, an American drama television series
- Chi (Chobits), a character in the manga series Chobits
- Sailor Chi, a character in the manga series Sailor Moon
- Chi, a character in the manga series Chi's Sweet Home
- "Chi", a song by Korn from the 1996 album Life Is Peachy

== Science and mathematics ==
- Chi site, a DNA sequence that serves as a recombination hot spot
- Chi distribution, in statistics
- Chi, the hyperbolic cosine integral
- CHI (conference) for SIGCHI and its annual journal CHI (subtitled Proceedings of ACM Conference on Human Factors in Computing Systems)
- A symbol for electronegativity

== People ==
- Chi Cheng (musician) (1970–2013), American musician
- Chi McBride (born 1961), American actor
- Chi Nguyen, Canadian politician
- Chi Onwurah (born 1965), British politician

== Other uses ==
- Chi, Pomoan name for Lavinia exilicauda chi, a cyprinid fish
- Chi, a person's guardian spirit in the Odinani beliefs of the Igbo people of Nigeria
- Chi River, Thailand
- an abbreviation for Chichester, England
- Chi (magazine), an Italian magazine
- Chi (instrument) a Chinese flute
- Chingford railway station, railway station code

== See also ==
- Chi-Chi (disambiguation)
- CHI (disambiguation), as an initialism or acronym
- Chicago, known as the Chi
- Qi (disambiguation)
