= Child Health International =

UK-based charity

Child Health International (CHI) is a Winchester (UK)-based charity, involved in improving the healthcare of children in Russia, Eastern Europe and a new project to help children with cystic fibrosis in India. It was founded as the International Integrated Health Association in 1992 by Roy and Dorothea Ridgway, the parents of a child with cystic fibrosis.

The charity's senior medical advisor is Dr Julian Legg, a paediatric consultant who is also head of the paediatric respiratory department at Southampton Children's Hospital. Mr Jim Hopwood is the current chairman.

Odesa University awarded Roy Ridgway a posthumous honorary doctorate for the charity's work helping Ukrainian children with cystic fibrosis and heart problems.
