= Chick Springs =

Chick Springs,
- Mineral springs
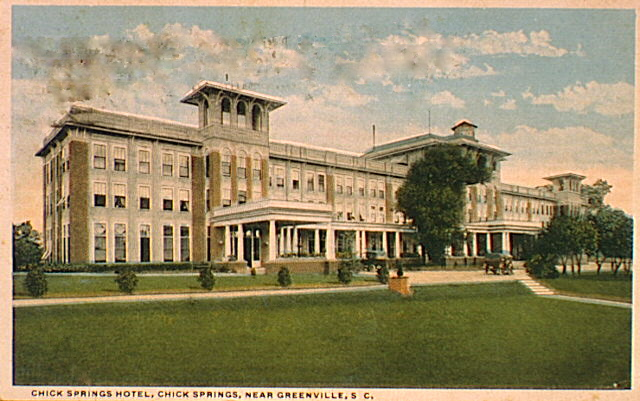
- The final Chick Springs Hotel, c. 1914.
- Interactive map of Chick Springs,
- Coordinates: 34°55.7′N 82°17.4′W
- Country: United States
- State: South Carolina
- County: Greenville

Chick Springs is a mineral springs in present-day Taylors, Greenville County, South Carolina, which from the mid-nineteenth to the early twentieth century served as the focus of a small Upstate South Carolina resort community.

== Nineteenth century ==
The healing power of the mineral waters was known to Native Americans living near the Enoree River, and several early European visitors commented on them, including the architect Robert Mills, who in 1826 described the perfectly clear water as smelling strongly “like the washings of a gun barrel” and claimed it to be useful in “curing ring worms and other cutaneous disorders.”

In 1840, planter Burwell Chick opened a resort at the location, building a “large and commodious hotel.” He also allowed some individual "cottages" to be built on the property. After Chick's death in 1847, the enterprise continued under two of his sons, Pettus and Reuben. By the 1850s, when the railroad had reached the Upstate, the resort attracted hundreds of visitors at a time and boosted the local economy, farmers “for ten and twenty miles around” finding a market for their livestock and produce.

A visiting Catholic priest found the resort “like all watering-places,” largely “patronized by those in quest of pleasure or matrimonial alliances.” A reporter in 1854 noted “the whole house busy” with “five or six tables of whist parties below the piazzas, two or three card tables employed in the drawing room, two pianos accompanied by sweet voices, one billiard table, at which the balls were constantly cracking, a nine-pin alley, and a great many outsiders and lookers on busily engaged in smoking their cigars. Some were walking to the spring, and at the spring house some were pitching quoits for exercise after drinking the sulphur and chalybeate water.” The reporter further noted the dissection of a fresh watermelon and evening dances that often lasted until midnight.

The Chick brothers sold the property in 1857. On the afternoon of November 4, 1862, the hotel caught fire and burned to the ground. In 1868 the Chicks repurchased the property, then in 1885 sold it to George Westmoreland, an Atlanta lawyer, who put up a new hotel and several cottages.

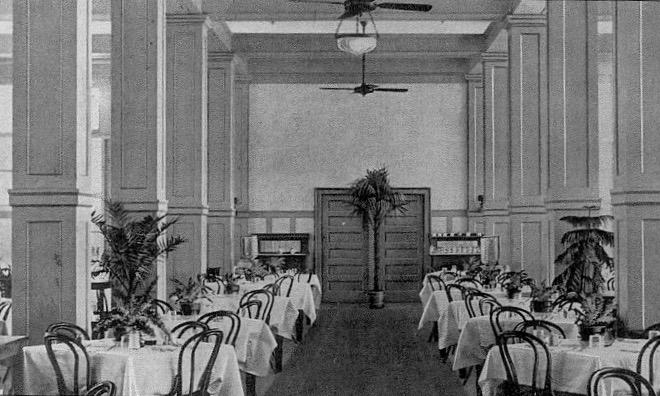
Chick Springs Hotel dining room (c. 1904)

== Twentieth century and later years ==
In 1903, Westmoreland sold the property to prosperous Greenville grocer and entrepreneur James A. Bull, who greatly enlarged the hotel. In 1905, Bull had 4000 guests from May to October. The grounds of his 117 acres included pavilions, croquet grounds, tennis courts, and golf links. Guests could participate in bowling, archery, target shooting, swimming, and horseback riding. The hotel featured telegraph and long-distance telephone lines, and New York and Washington newspapers could be purchased on the evening of publication. Bull also bottled the spring water for sale.

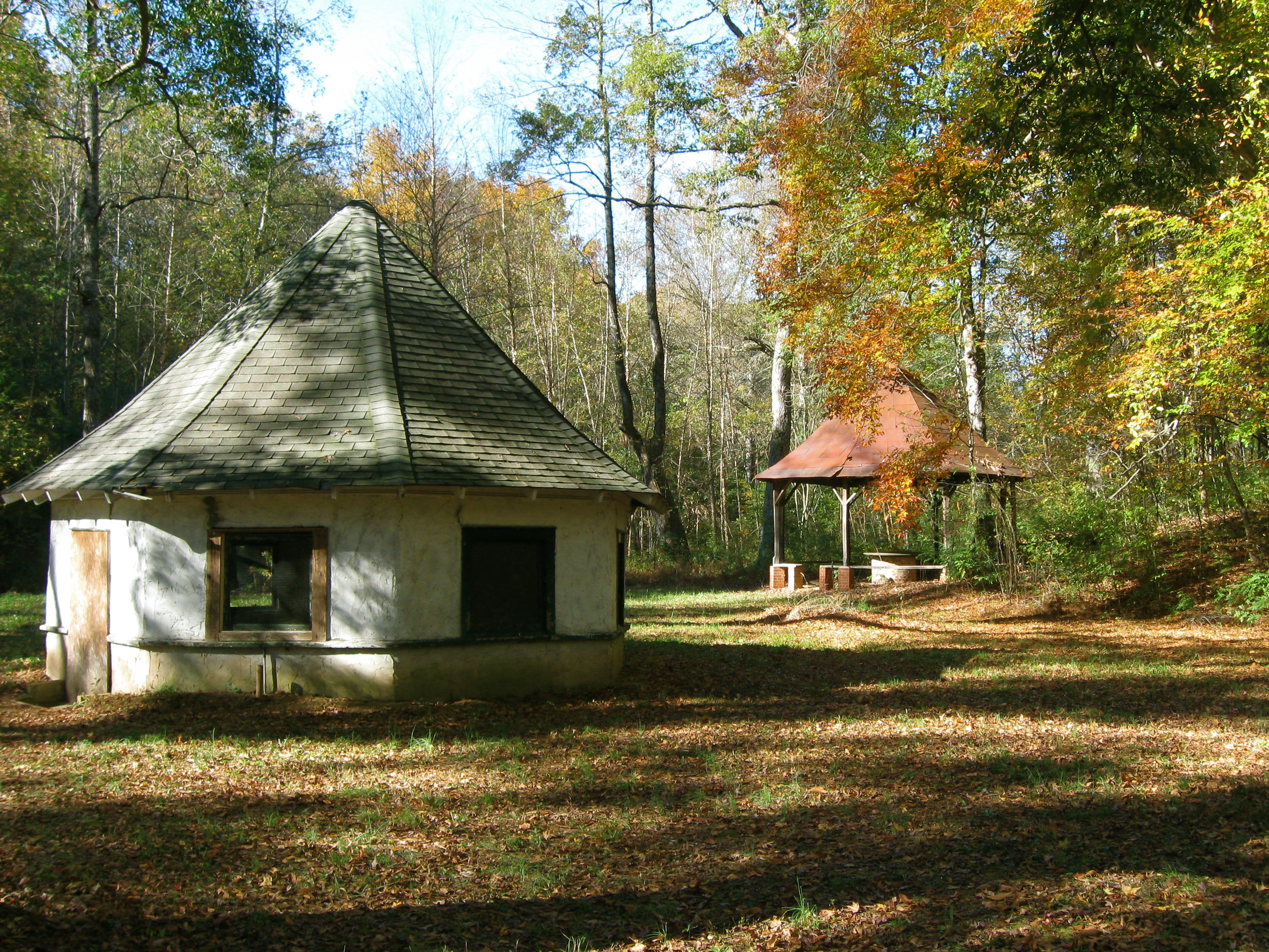
Chick Springs spring house and gazebo, 2010.

In December 1907, Bull's hotel also burned, although Bull had his own firefighting apparatus and saved most of the outlying buildings and cottages. In 1914, Bull completed an even larger $100,000 hotel “of Spanish architecture, three stories in height, fireproof, and with all the modern equipment and facilities.” Bull's venture was unsuccessful, and the property briefly served from 1916 to 1917 as a military academy. Bull then promoted a combination hotel and sanitarium under the direction of a graduate of the University of Georgia, Dr. Benjamin Broadus Steedly, an enterprise that closed shortly after Steedly's death in 1932.

Bottling mineral water from the springs remained profitable, and in 1927, the Chick Springs Ginger Ale Company was incorporated to manufacture carbonated beverages. The Company also constructed a swimming pool and opened a park that included picnic facilities and a large dance floor.

In 1925, the South Carolina Highway Department constructed a highway through the Chick Springs amusement park and bottling plant that resulted in the amusement park and other properties being located on the western side of the highway that included a 30-foot embankment. In September 1929, after a heavy rainfall, the embankment acted as a dam because the highway department had installed an inadequate culvert. The amusement park and other properties on the tract were submerged in up to twenty feet of water, and the springs were filled with sand and mud. After the owners sued the state, the South Carolina Supreme Court ruled that governmental subdivisions could be sued for inverse condemnation.

By the 21st century only the spring house and a picnic gazebo remained of the former resort. A Chick Springs Historical Society was organized in 2008 with the goal of purchasing the seven-acre site around the springs and preserving it as a park. In the summer of 2024, a 8.6 acre parcel that included the spring was acquired by Taylors TownSquare, a community-based nonprofit organization, with the intention of creating a park following historic preservation analysis. In September 2024, the spring house was destroyed by a tree that fell during Hurricane Helene. As of January 2025, Taylors TownSquare is working with a historic preservation specialists to develop an existing conditions report and restoration plan for the site.
