= Chichester and Harbour Independents =

- Leader: Louise Goldsmith
- Treasurer: Cllr Martyn Bell
- Founded: 10 March 2021
- Headquarters: Corner Cottage; West Itchenor; West Sussex; PO20 7BZ
- Ideology: Localism
- Colours: Grey
- Chichester District Council: 2 / 36

Website
- https://www.chichesterandharbourindependents.org

Chichester and Harbour Independents (CHI) is a political party based in Chichester, England. CHI was founded in 2021 and currently holds two seats on Chichester District Council. Both councillors were elected as Conservatives at the last district election but resigned to sit as independents on 28 September 2020. The Leader of CHI is Louise Goldsmith, a former Conservative leader of West Sussex County Council who stood down from the council at the last county election.

CHI was launched in October 2021. The party identifies itself as an "independent voice" for residents of Chichester and the harbour villages.

== Political positions ==
The party has outlined eight political positions on which it stands:

- A halt on new housebuilding in the area.
- Ensuring voices in the community are heard through greater engagement.
- Improvements to the environment.
- Careful management of taxpayers money.
- Protection of our rich local heritage.
- Effective adequate sewage and drainage systems.
- A permanent solution to the chaos on the A27.
- Better road, walking and cycle infrastructure.

== Election results ==
=== West Sussex County Council ===
| Election | Constituency | Candidate | Votes | % | Notes |
|---|---|---|---|---|---|
| 2021 | Chichester West | Gregory Fielder | 727 | 18.1 | Not elected |
