= Chin, Iran =

Chin چين
- Village
- Location within Iran
- Coordinates: 32°47′07″N 49°42′32″E
- Country: Iran
- Province: Chaharmahal and Bakhtiari
- County: Kuhrang
- Bakhsh: Central
- Rural District: Miankuh-e Moguyi

Population (2006)
  - Total: 159
- Time zone: UTC+3:30 (IRST)
  - Summer (DST): UTC+4:30 (IRDT)

Chin (Persian: چين, also Romanized as Chīn) is a village in Miankuh-e Moguyi Rural District, in the Central District of Kuhrang County, Chaharmahal and Bakhtiari Province, Iran. At the 2006 census, its population was 159, in 32 families. The village is populated by Lurs.
