= Can de Chira =

Spanish breed of dog

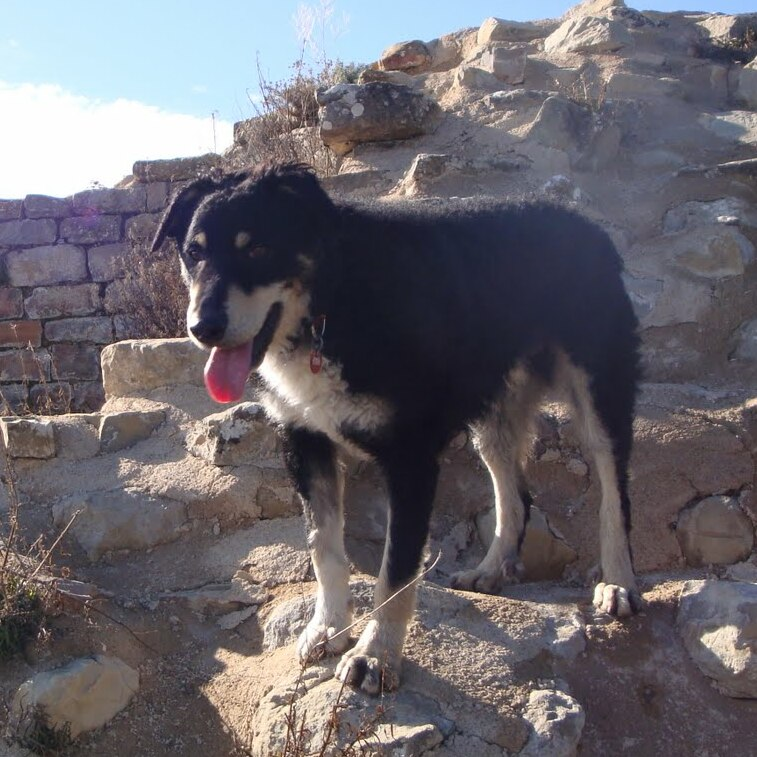
- Other names: Perro pastor altoaragonés
- Origin: Aragon (Spain)
- Breed status: Not recognised as a breed by any major kennel club.
Traits
Height	Males	42–47 cm (17–19 in)
	Females	38–43 cm (15–17 in)
Weight	Males	16–20 kg (35–45 lb)
	Females	12–16 kg (25–35 lb)
- Coat: mid-length, longer on body and limbs, shorter on head and neck
- Colour: black with white face, limbs, chest and belly

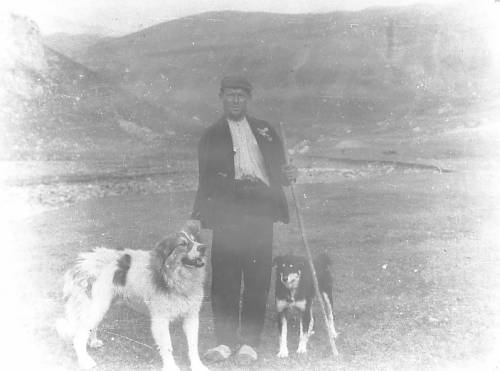
Historic photo showing a Can de Chira (right) and a mastiff (left)

The Can de Chira or Perro pastor altoaragonés is a Spanish breed of herding dog from the mountainous Alto Aragon region in the northern part of the autonomous community of Aragon, in north-eastern Spain.

Accounts of similar dogs used by Spanish graziers to herd sheep and cattle date back several centuries; the earliest photographs date from the early twentieth century. The Can de Chira was formerly widely distributed in the Province of Huesca and in neighbouring areas; it was used by the shepherds of Aragon, and by those of Navarre, Occitanie and Catalonia. In the twenty-first century the small number of remaining animals are concentrated principally in the comarcas of Ribagorza and Sobrarbe.
