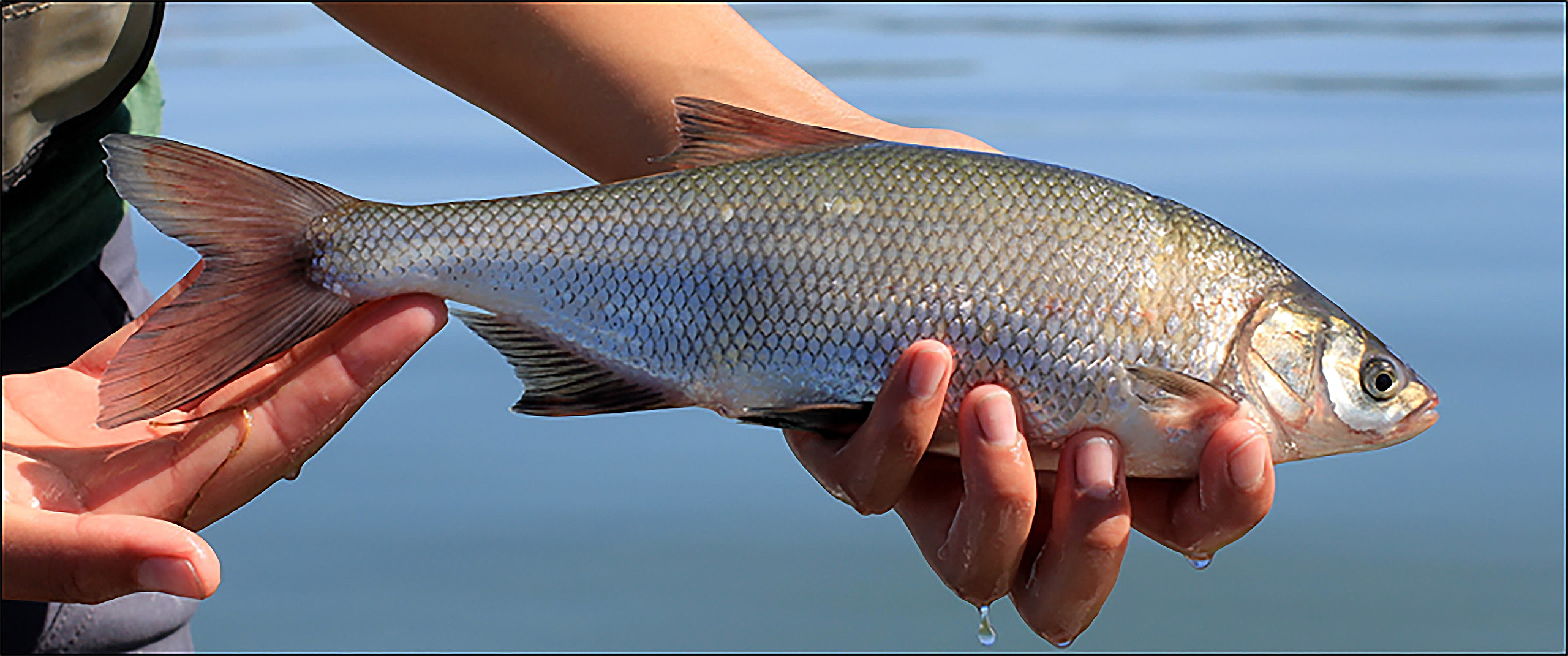

Conservation status
- Critically Imperiled (NatureServe)

Scientific classification
- Kingdom: Animalia
- Phylum: Chordata
- Class: Actinopterygii
- Division: Teleostei
- Order: Cypriniformes
- Family: Leuciscidae
- Genus: Lavinia
- Species: L. exilicauda
- Subspecies: L. e. chi

Trinomial name
- Lavinia exilicauda chi Hopkirk, 1974

= Clear Lake hitch =

Subspecies of fish

The Clear Lake hitch (Lavinia exilicauda chi) is a freshwater fish and a subspecies of the hitch (Lavinia exilicauda). It is a cyprinid fish that is endemic to Clear Lake, California. They are large minnows that can grow to lengths that exceed 35 cm (14 in) standard length. The fish has a life cycle of four to six years. During the winter and spring, when the rains fill up dry rivers, they migrate up the lake's tributaries to spawn. In 2014, it was listed as threatened by the state of California. Local Pomo Tribes call Clear Lake hitch "chi" and harvested the fish during its spawning runs.

== Taxonomy ==
The Clear Lake hitch is in the Cyprinidae family, which consists of minnows and carp. The genus Lavinia is closely related to another minnow with the genus Hesperoleucus, also known as California Roach. Due to the close relatedness of the hitch and California roach, there has been debate on if the two fish should be in the same genera or not. Data from restriction-site associated DNA (RAD) sequencing on both species has shown that the two fishes should be split into two genera. Another researcher collected and analyzed microsatellite and mitochondrial DNA from both species. From their data, they found that the microsatellite loci could separate out the roach, hitch, and both fish's respective subspecies from one another.

The Clear Lake hitch is one of three subspecies of hitch. The three subspecies of hitch:

1. Sacramento hitch (L. exilicauda exilicauda)
2. Monterey hitch (L. exilicauda harengus)
3. Clear Lake hitch (L. exilicauda chi)

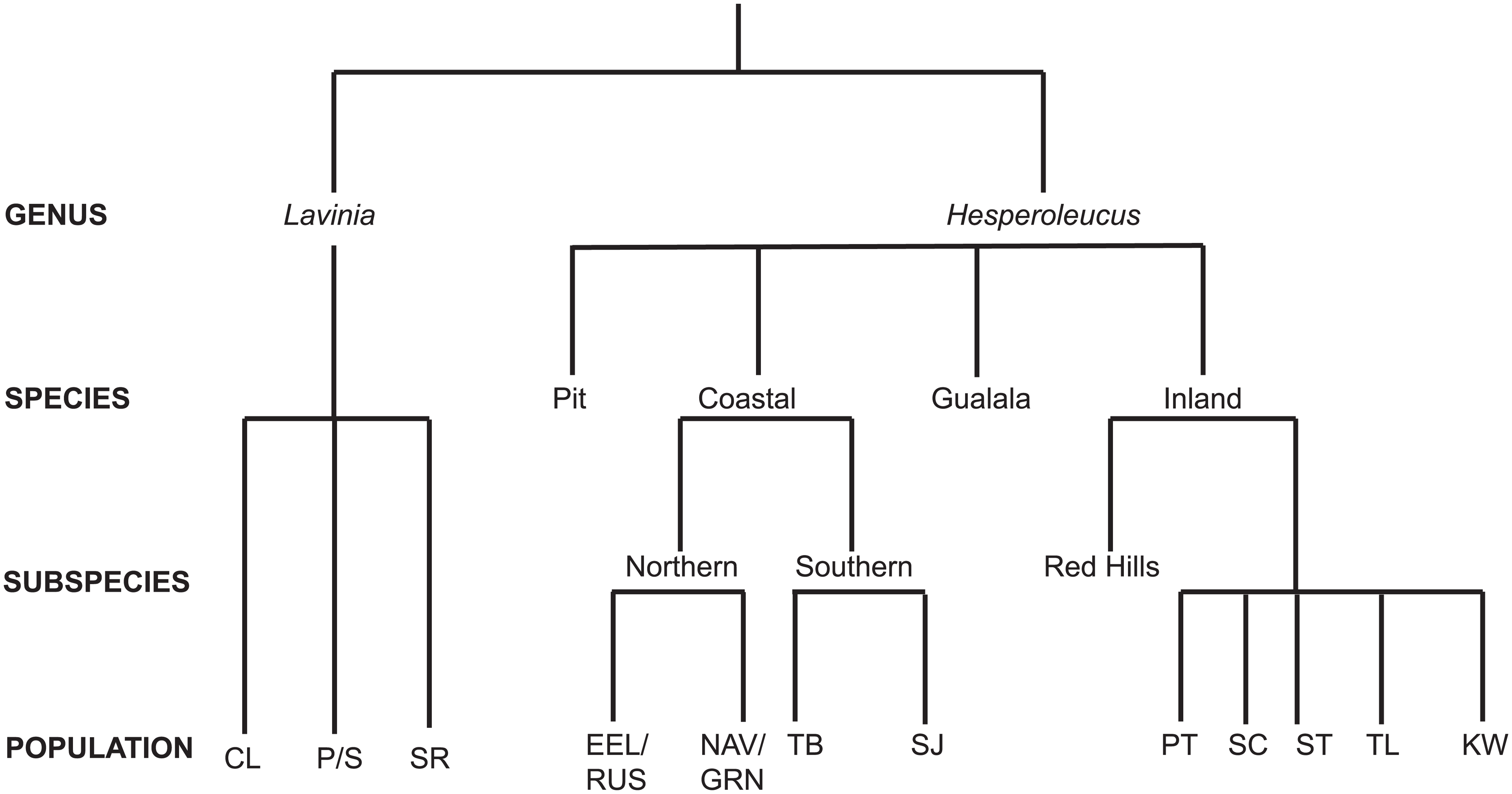
Fig.1 A proposed taxonomic hierarchy of the Hitch and Roach from the data that used RAD DNA sequencing.

Genomic data has shown that Clear Lake hitch is distinct from Monterey hitch based on the microsatellite genetic distances. The Clear Lake hitch is geographically isolated from the two other subspecies. Hitch and California roach are capable of mating, resulting in hybrids; however, due to the Clear Lake hitch's isolation, not many observations have been made of the two mating and creating offspring.

== Description ==
The bodies of Clear Lake hitch are deep and laterally compressed, with a small conical-shaped head, an upward-pointing mouth, moderately large scales, and decurved lateral lines. They can grow to lengths that exceed 35 cm standard length (SL), their bodies becoming deeper as their length increases. They have a narrow caudal peduncle connected to a large forked tail. The pharyngeal teeth are long, narrow, and slightly hooked with a broad surface that is designed for grinding. The Clear Lake hitch has a deeper body, larger eyes, and more gill rakers compared to the other subspecies of hitch. They have 10-12 dorsal fin rays, 11-14 anal fin rays, and 26-32 gill rakers.

Juveniles are silver with a dark spot on their caudal peduncle that extends towards the head in the form of a black stripe that gradually fades. Adults no longer have the dark spot on their caudal peduncle and have become duller in color with the dorsal area turning brownish-yellow. There is sexual dimorphism present where the females are significantly larger than the males at all ages. Females typically mature in their second or third years, while males mature in their first, second, or third year.

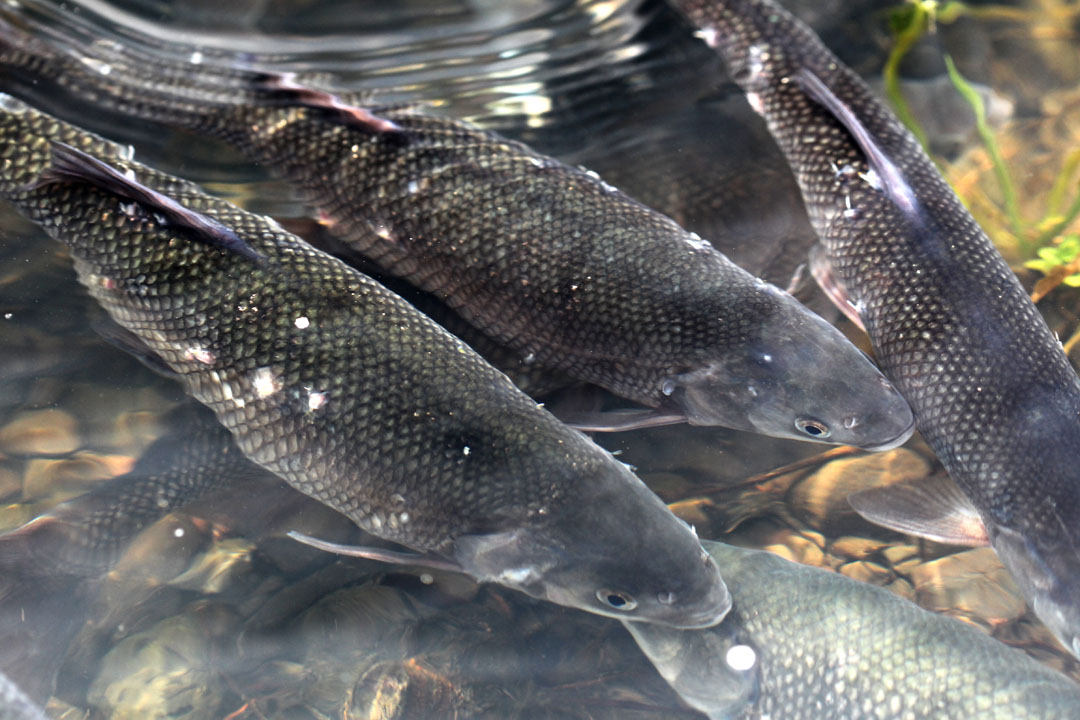
Fig. 2 Adult Clear Lake hitch.

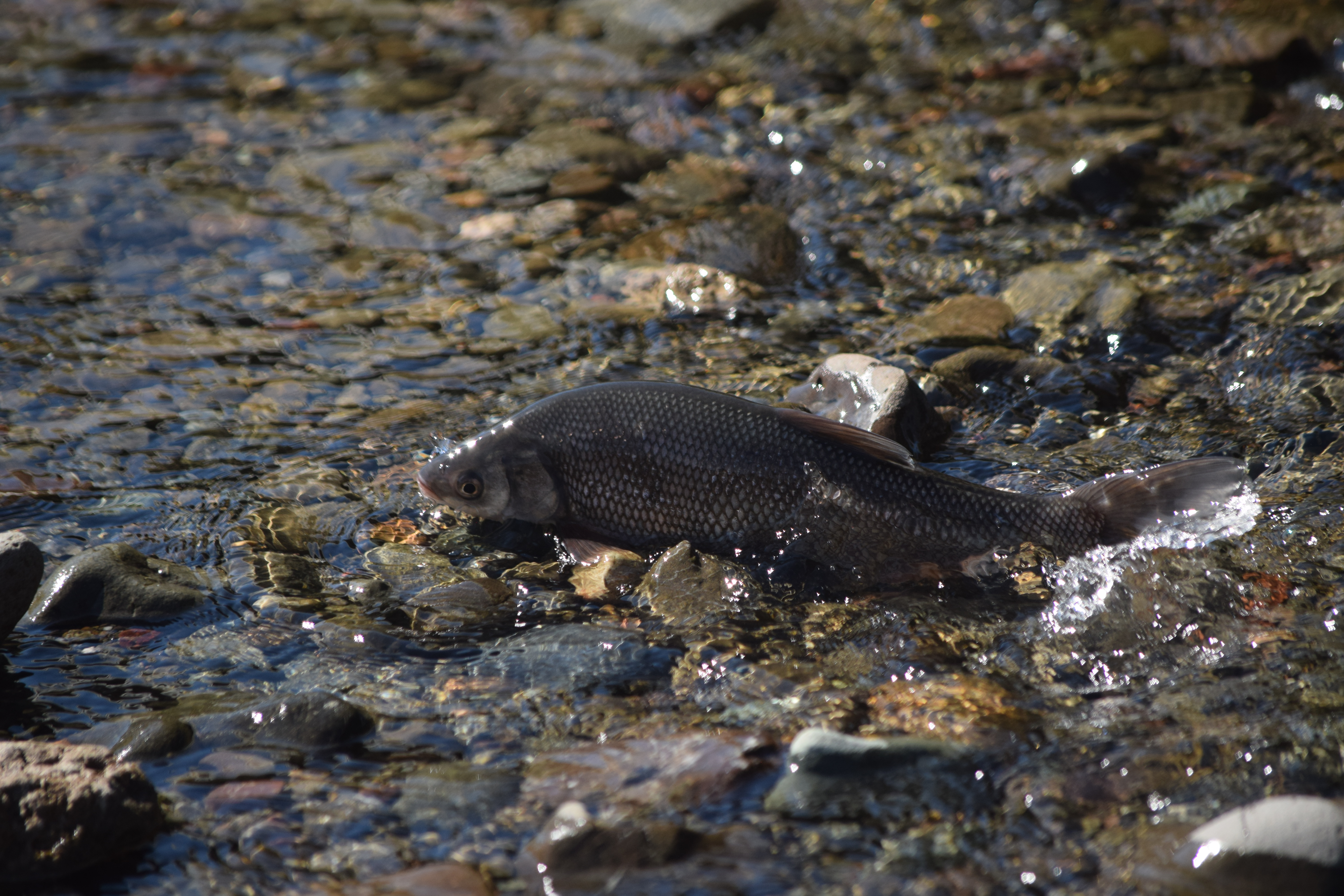
Fig. 3 Another image of an adult hitch.

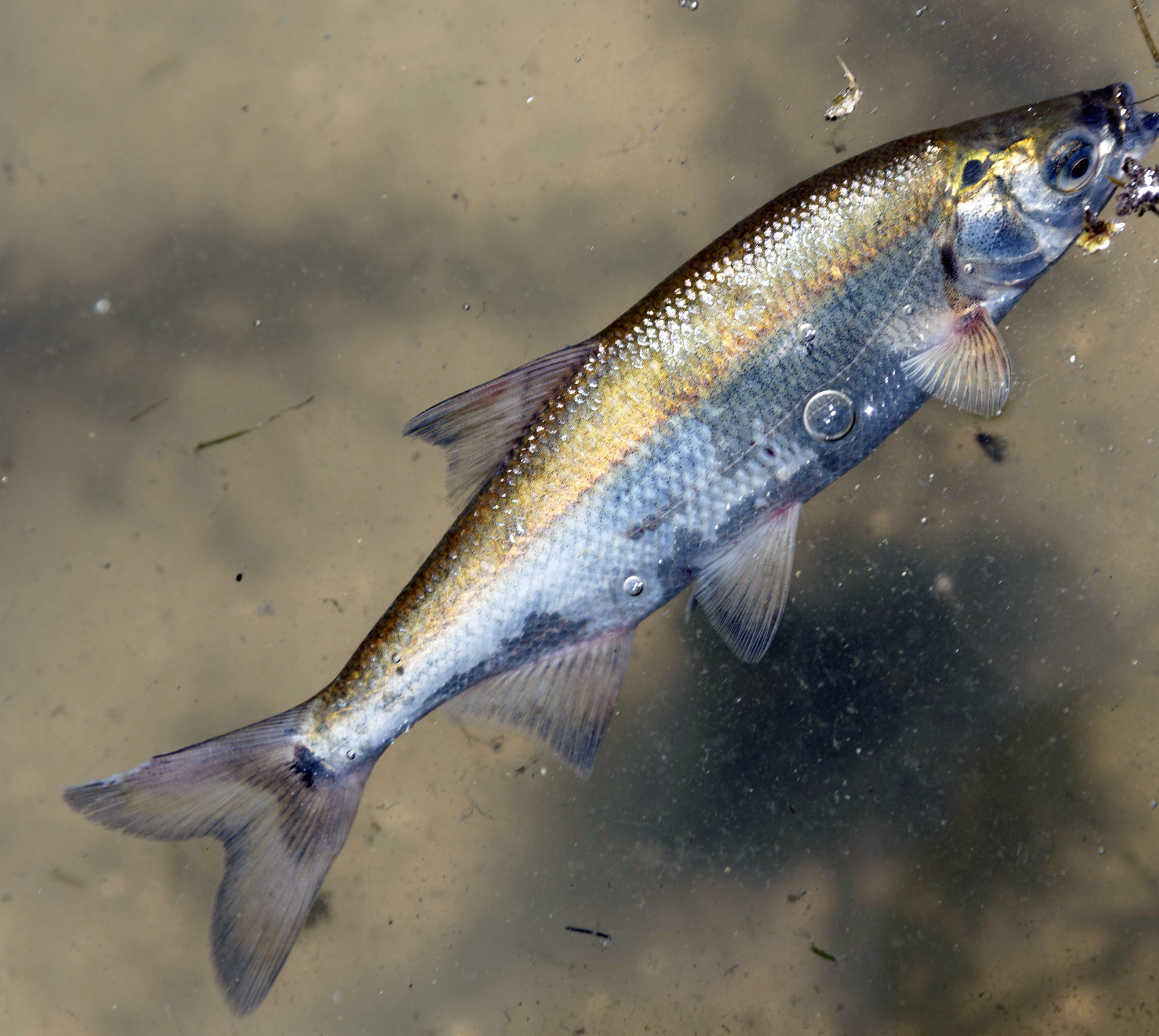
Fig. 4 Juvenile Clear Lake hitch.

== Distribution and habitat ==
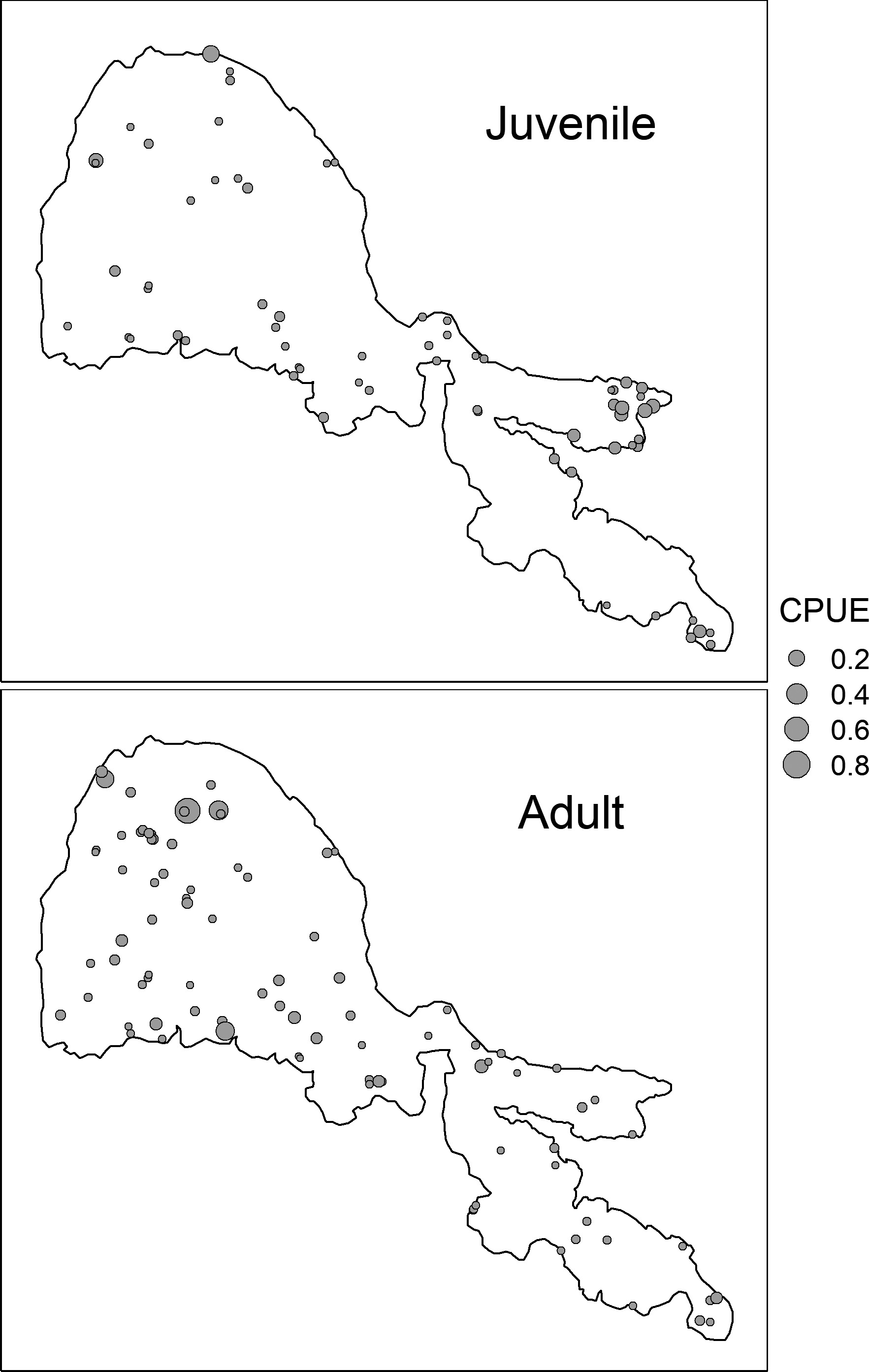
Fig. 5 The distribution of juvenile and adult Clear Lake Hitch in Clear Lake during the summer.

Clear Lake hitch resides in Clear Lake, which is the largest natural freshwater lake that is entirely within California. Juveniles are typically seen in nearshore habitats in the lake, while adults have a wider distribution throughout the lake. Changing habitats from nearshore to a broader range in the lake suggests that ontogenetic habitat expansion occurs (as the fish develops, its habitat changes). It has been proposed that juveniles stay in nearshore habitats because it offers protection from predation by largemouth bass (Micropterus salmoides) and channel catfish (Ictalurus punctatus), both of which are non-native fish. Meanwhile, adult hitch live a nomadic, planktivorous lifestyle, resulting in them having a larger habitat range than juveniles. Clear Lake has three main arms: the upper, lower, and Oaks arm. Clear Lake has multiple tributary streams; the largest ones are Kelsey Creek, Scotts Creek, and Middle Creek, which flow into the upper arm. Smaller streams that flow into the upper arm include Manning Creek, Adobe Creek, and Cole Creek. Siegler Creek flows into the Cache Creek channel located at the lower arm.

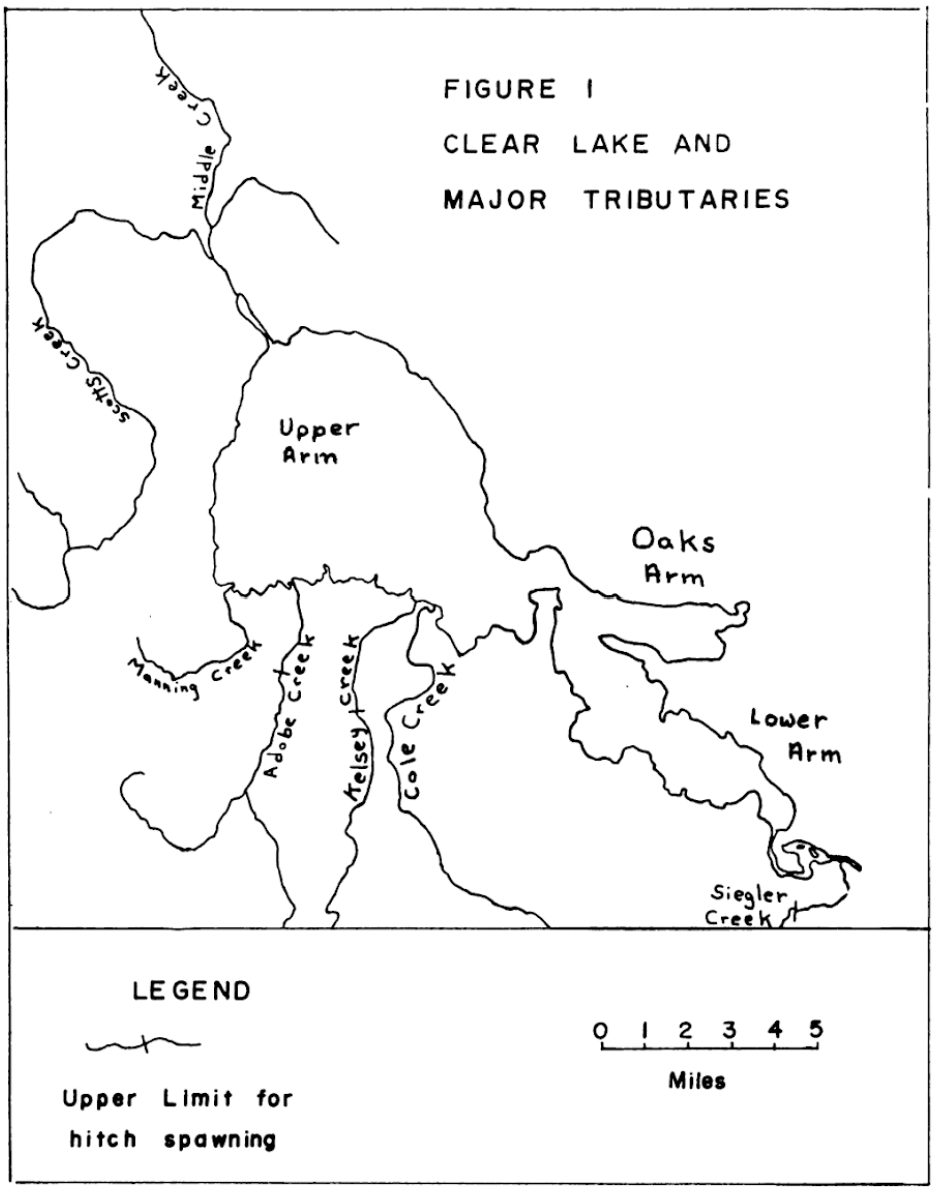
Fig. 6 Location of the Arms and Major Tributaries.

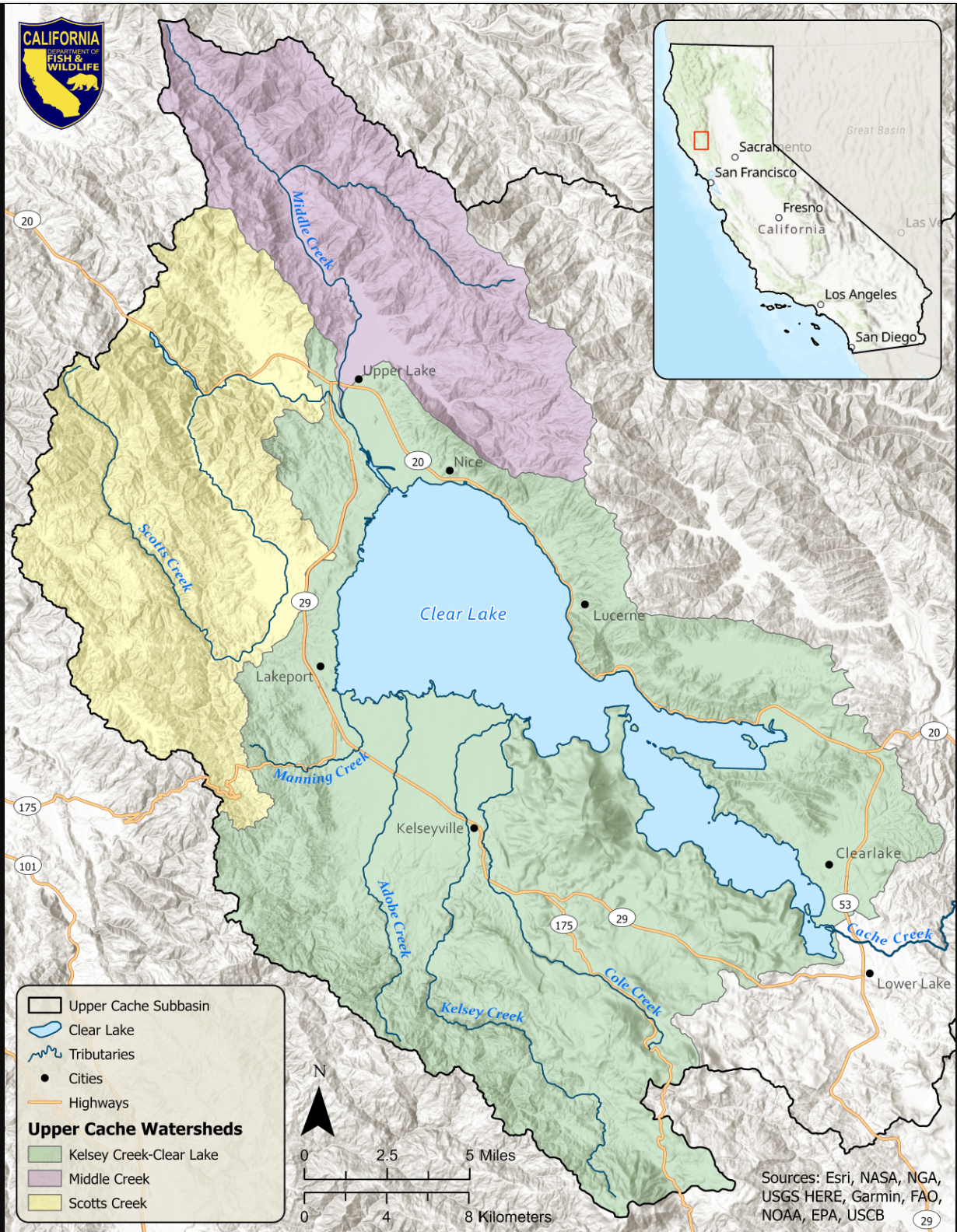
Fig. 7 Map of Clear Lake and its Tributaries.

All of the streams listed are used by the fish as spawning streams. The lake's perimeter has many intermittent streams, which are typically dry, except during winter through spring. During this time period, the streams are flooded by water from the seasonal rains due to the local Mediterranean climate. The lake is eutrophic and has a tendency to have algal blooms that reduce the amount of oxygen available in the lake, which can kill the fish. Clear Lake has been highly altered from its natural state; one example of this is the loss of the wetland habitat formerly around the perimeter of the lake. Another way the lake has been altered is the introduction of non-native species that support robust recreational fisheries.

== Ecology ==
=== Diet ===
The Clear Lake hitch is an omnivore. Juvenile hitch between 19–30 mm standard length feeds primarily on larvae and pupae of chironomid midges. Juveniles are also seen feeding on planktonic crustaceans, which include Bosmina and Daphnia, plus the eggs, larvae, and adults of the Clear Lake gnat (Chaoborus astictopus). In an experiment, hitch caught in the afternoon had something in their stomachs; based on the observations, the researchers determined that they feed during the daytime. The experiment found that adults longer than 50 mm standard length feed primarily on Daphnia, occasionally eating zooplankton and adult midges.

=== Life cycle ===
The Clear Lake hitch has a potamodromous life cycle. A potamodromous life cycle means that the fish live in the lake, migrate upstream to spawn, and the young emigrate back to the lake. Adults will ascend Clear Lake's ephemeral tributaries, rivers that flow into the lake, during the spring to spawn. During the spring, seasonal rains will fill rivers that are usually dry. The water from the rains gives them a window to migrate, spawn, larval development to occur, and allow juveniles to emigrate to the lake. However, since the rivers fill up seasonally, there is a limited time period that allows spawning, young to develop, then emigrate back to the lake before the stream dries up. There have been some observations of the fish spawning along the shoreline of Clear Lake, but it is not their primary spawning location. Spawning has been observed to occur in shallow, slow-moving streams that are around 13 °C. Females have around 36,000 eggs. Clear Lake hitch spawning has multiple males burst swimming; the fish alternates between accelerating and gliding alongside a female in an attempt to fertilize the eggs that the female releases. The eggs the female releases quickly sink and settle into the crevices of unprepared rocky substrate.

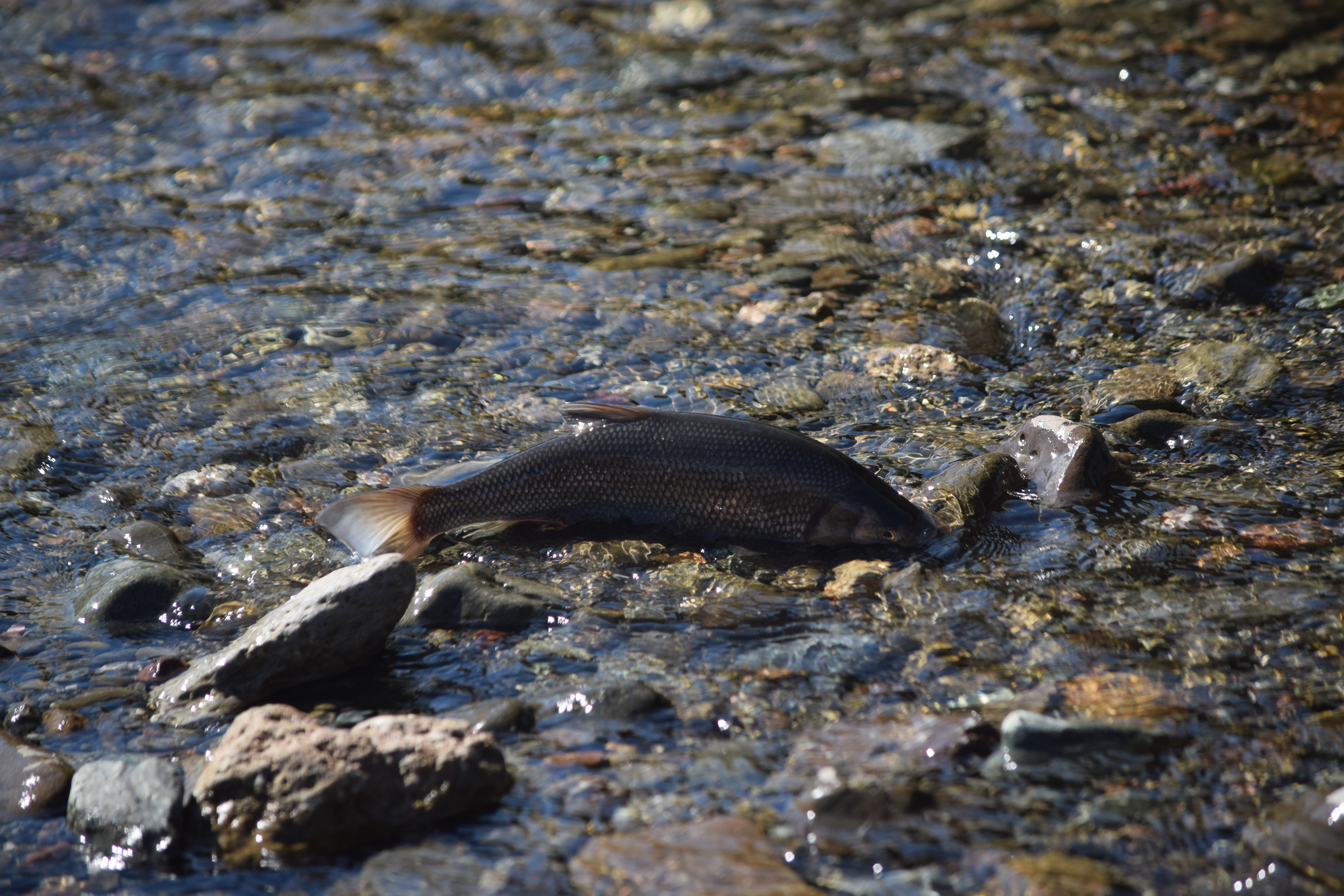
Fig. 8 A clear lake hitch in a spawning river.

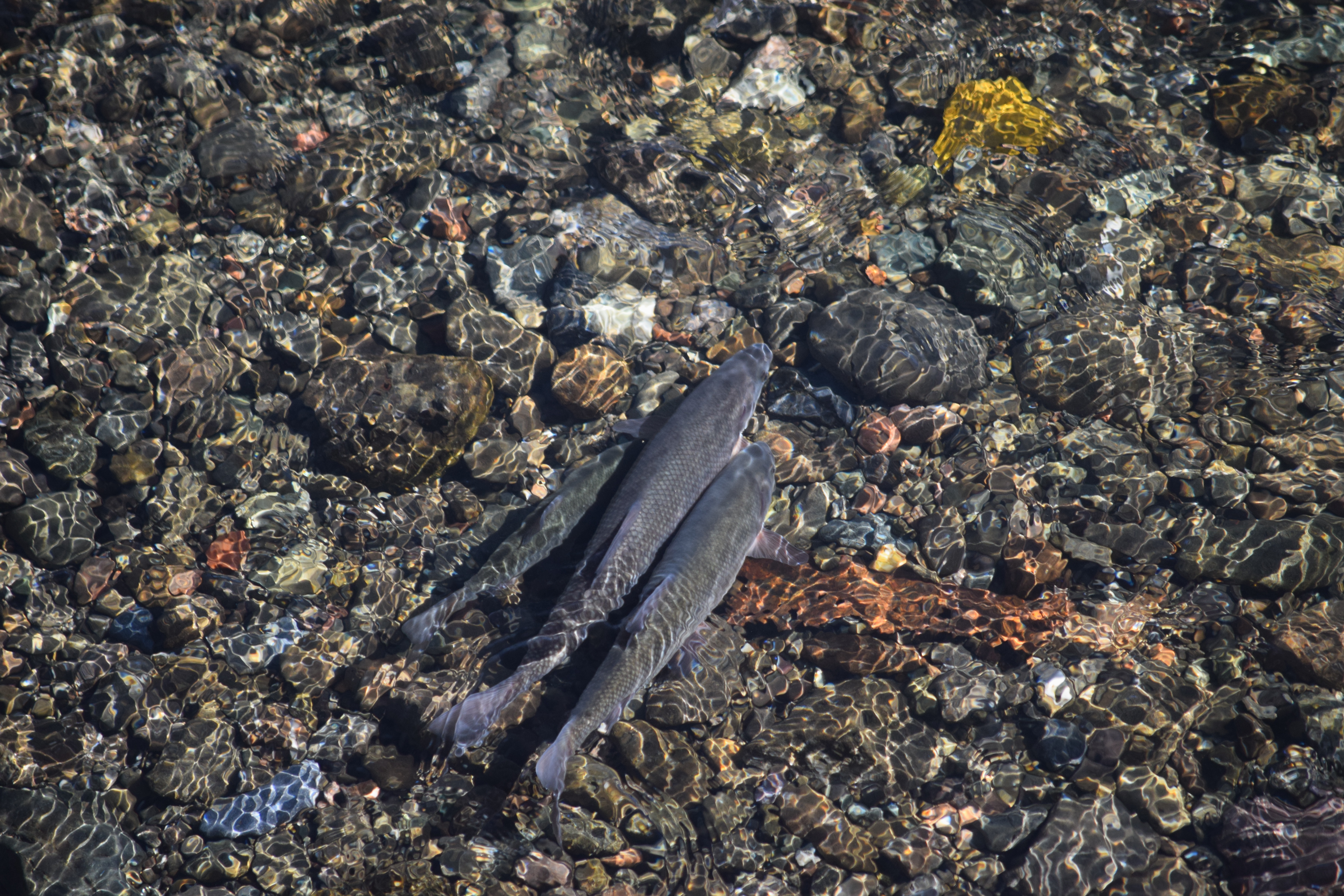
Fig. 9 Prior to burst swimming, two males (the two shorter fish that are on each side of the fish in the middle) swimming alongside a female.

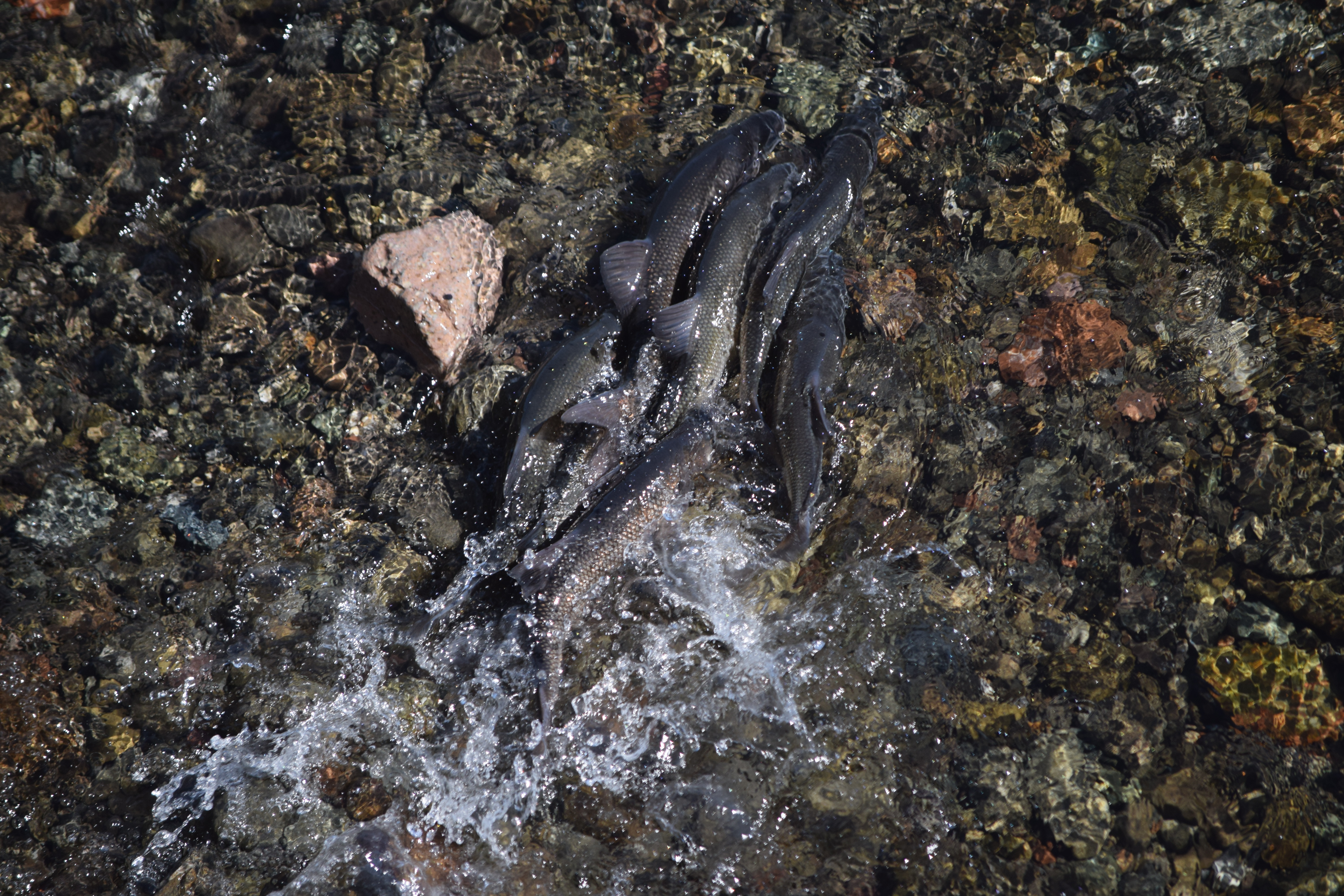
Fig. 10 During a burst swimming, several males are trying to fertilize the eggs broadcast by the female.

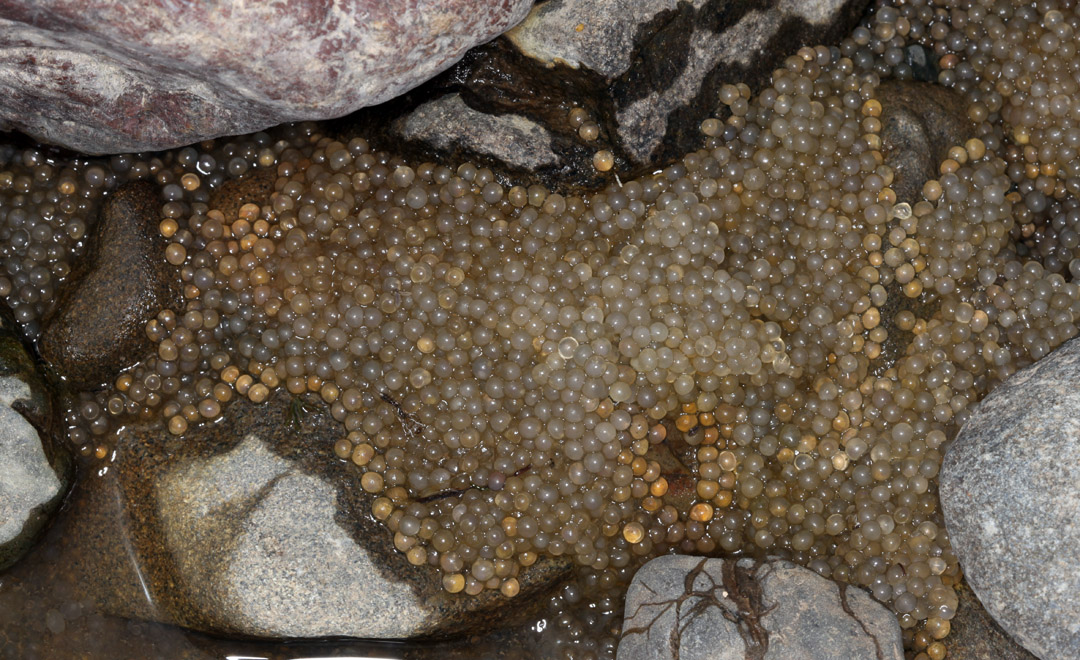
Fig. 11 Picture of eggs resting on the substrate of Adobe Creek as the water recedes from the Creek.

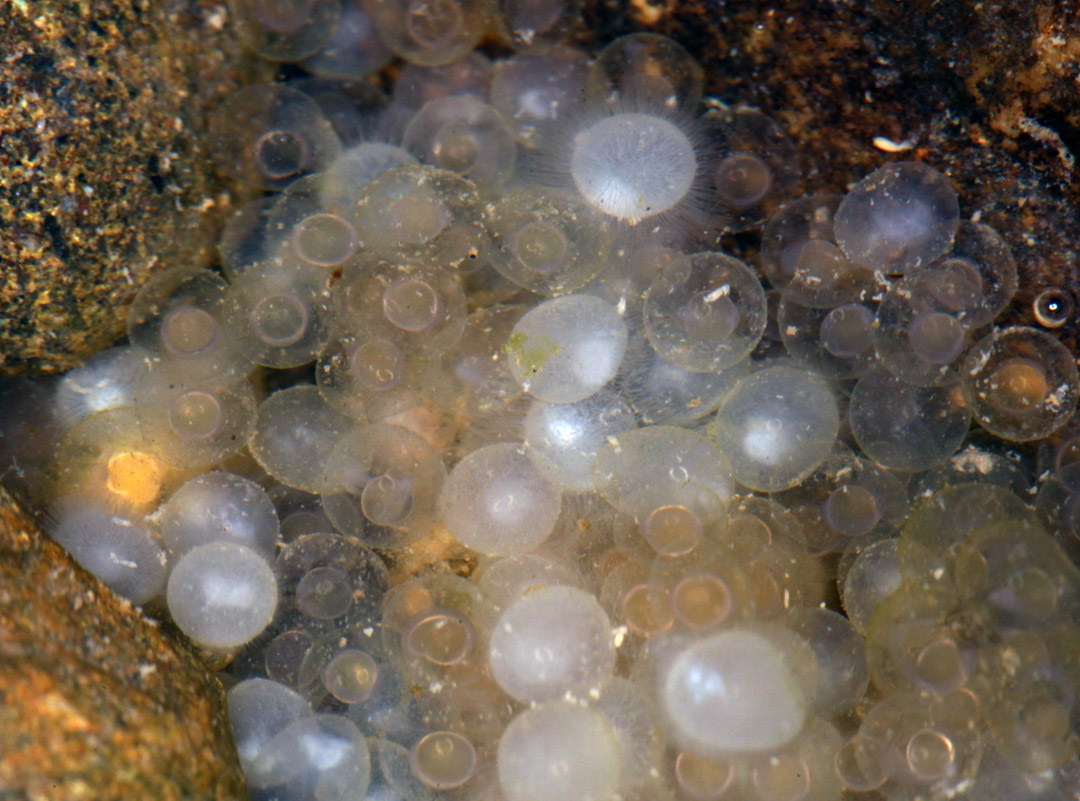
Fig. 12 A close of photograph of the eggs resting on the substrate of Adobe Creek.

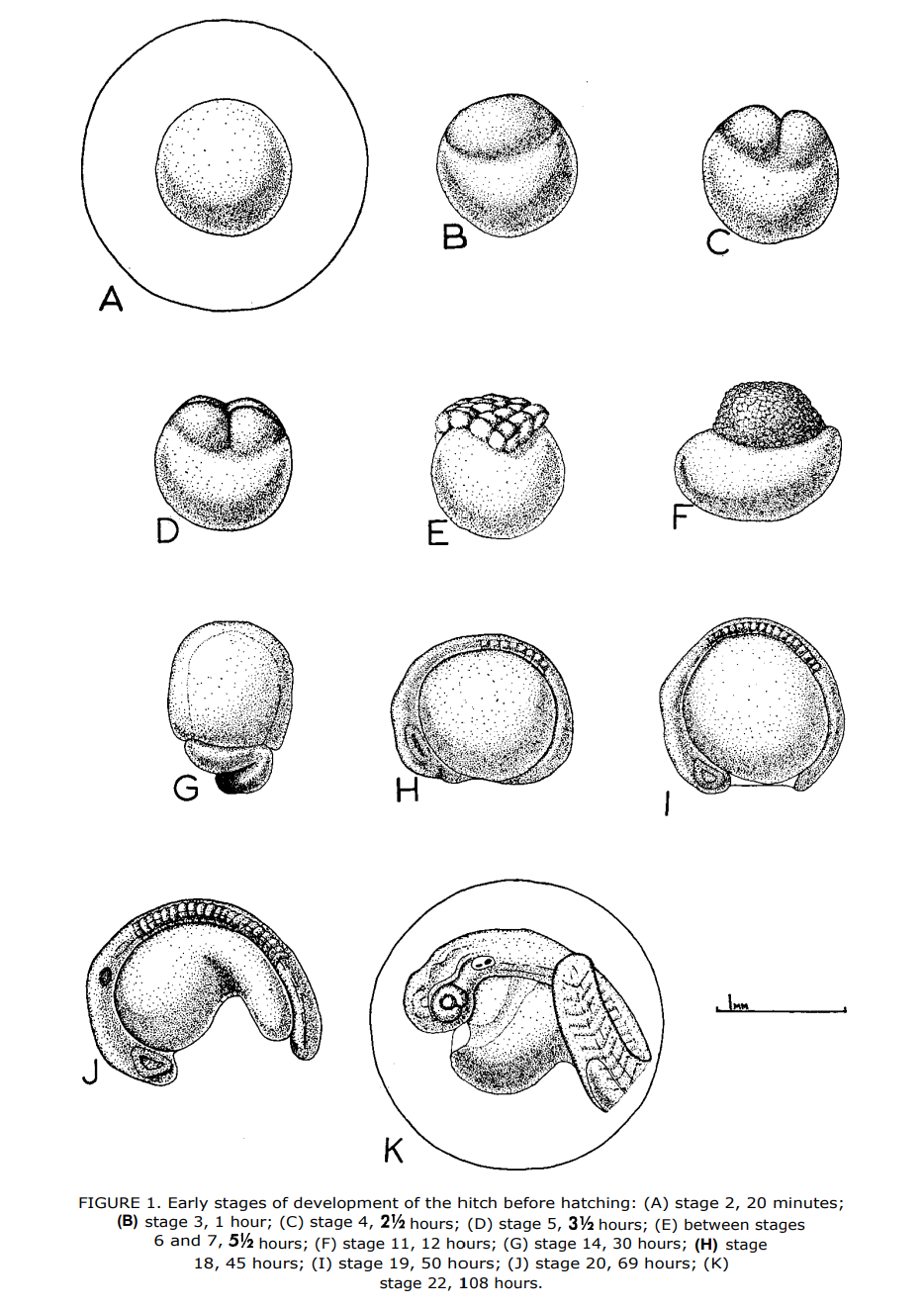
Fig. 13 Embryonic development of Clear Lake hitch.

Eggs that have not been fertilized appear pale orange, and once fertilized, the egg appears light yellow. It takes 120 hours after fertilization for the embryo to show a red spot, which is the heart, dorsal, anal, and caudal fin folds; pigment is visible in the eyes, making them appear sooty. On day six, the embryo is crowded in the egg membrane, with hatching occurring on the seventh day.

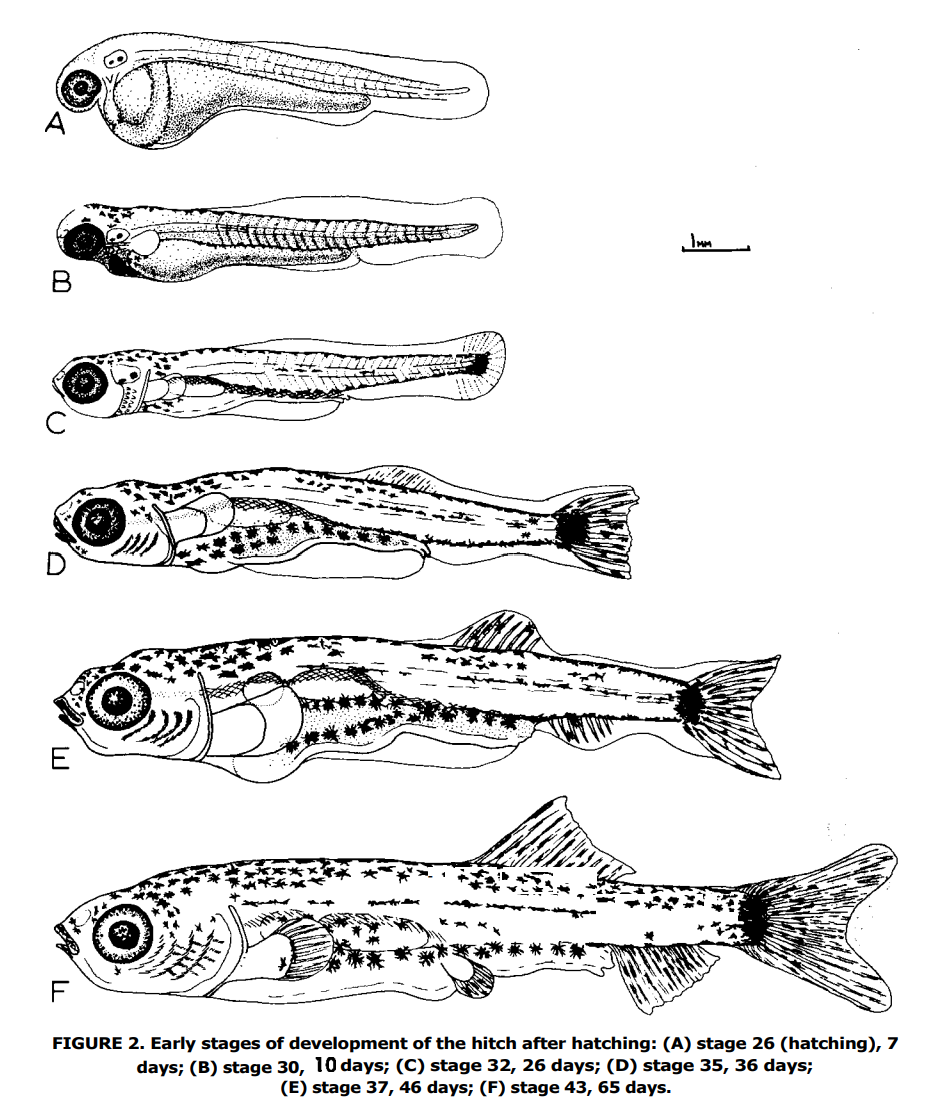
Fig. 14 The early development stages of Clear Lake hitch after hatching.

After hatching the prolarva (a newly hatched fish) at 6 mm long uses its tail to free itself, then lies on its side at the bottom of the water. On the fourteenth day, the prolarva were seen being able to swim and rest upright due to their air sac. At 20 days old, the prolarva becomes postlarvae (fish no longer have the yolk sack). At 32 days old the fish are 8.5 mm long, while at 58 days old the fish are juveniles that are 13 mm long. On the 36th day, the fish in the postlarval stage will have an outline of their dorsal fin, and 8 to 10 caudal fin rays have ossified (turned into bone). On the 46th day, the fish will have 8 to 10 dorsal, 6 to 8 anal, and 16 to 18 caudal fin rays ossified. On the 65th day the juveniles have fins that have a full set of ossified rays. It has been observed that juveniles migrated from their birth stream to Clear Lake between 11 and 152 days. Juveniles who were in a stream that is permanently wet, such as Rodman Slough and the river that runs into it, Middle Creek, entered Clear Lake later, then juveniles who spawned and hatched in smaller streams that temporarily had water running through them.

=== Interspecies interactions ===
One non-native fish species that established a large population in Clear Lake is the Mississippi silversides (Menidia audens); it was introduced in 1967. The Mississippi silversides are planktivores that live in the inshore areas of Clear Lake. Ten years after the introduction of the silversides, research was conducted to see if the Clear Lake hitch was impacted by the non-native fish. It was discovered that Clear Lake hitch's diet or growth rates weren't impacted by the introduced fish. Hitch avoided competing with the non-native fish by inhabiting inshore areas during spring to early summer when silverside populations were low. The Clear Lake hitch became limnetic, inhabiting the open water of the lake after they exceeded 50 mm standard length, which further helped the fish avoid competing with the silversides. Clear Lake hitch were not heavily impacted by the presence of Mississippi silverside because they evolved to avoid competition with the now extinct Clear Lake splittail (Pogonichtys ciscoides), which also inhabited the inshore areas of Clear Lake as the Mississippi silverside did during the experiment.

== Conservation status ==
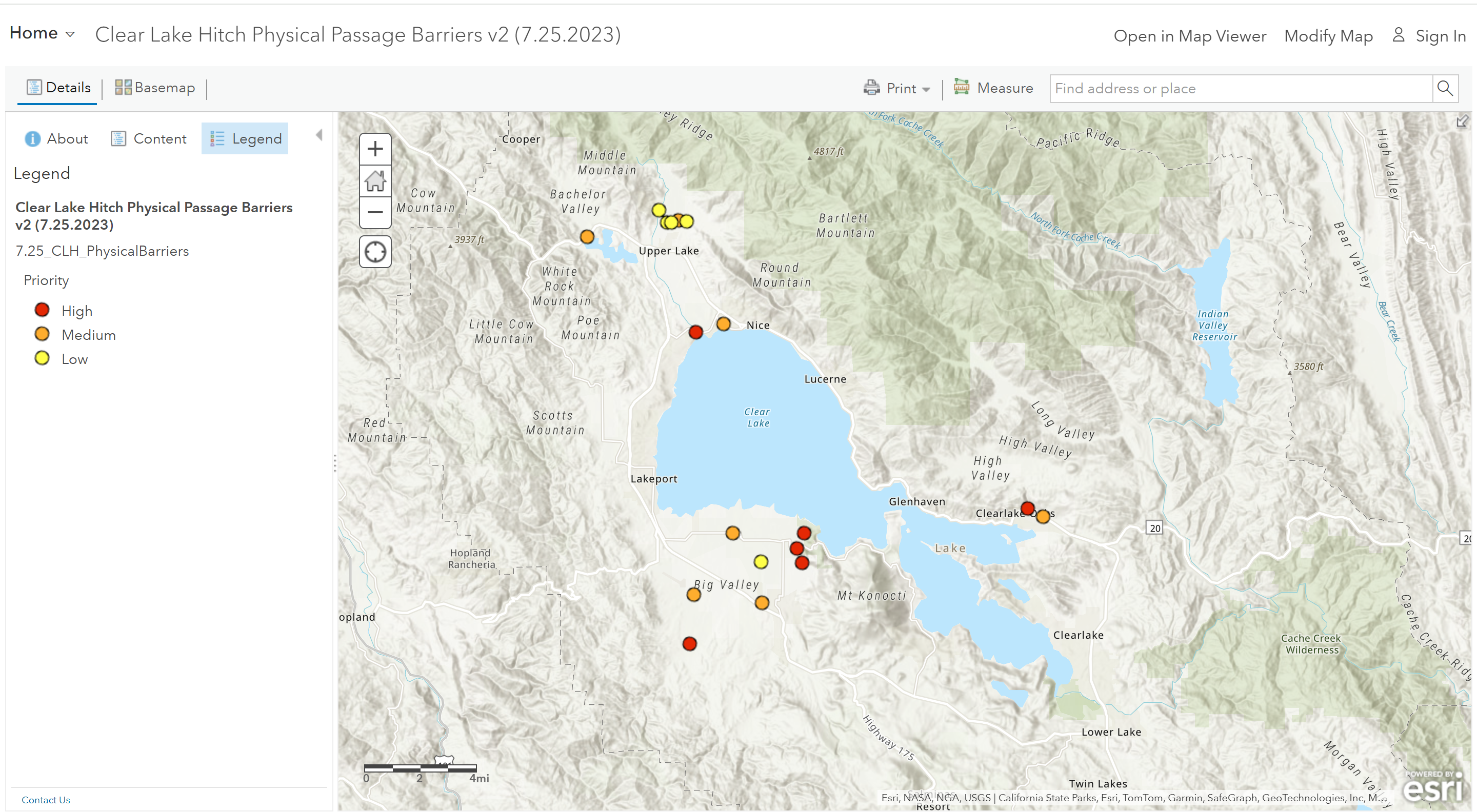
Fig. 15 A map of the physical passage barriers that impact the Clear Lake hitch.

The Clear Lake hitch was listed by the state of California as threatened in 2014 and has been petitioned to be listed under the United States ESA. The primary threats to the fish are the introduction of non-native species into their habitat, loss of spawning habitat (due to water management, dams, and changes in the land), habitat degradation due to mining and agriculture, loss of nursery areas due to changes in the lakeshore, and climate change. The Clear Lake hitch has not evolved to be aggressive/active swimmers; thus, small dams and other structures that make the stream inaccessible or cause less water to enter the stream can easily prevent them from being able to spawn. Kelsey Creek, Seigler Creek, and Adobe Creek had a total of nine barriers that potentially affected the fish as they migrated up the stream. However, Lake County has started to restore channelized streams to their natural states. Dams and structures delay spawning, which can result in adults and/or developing young becoming stranded in the drying streams.

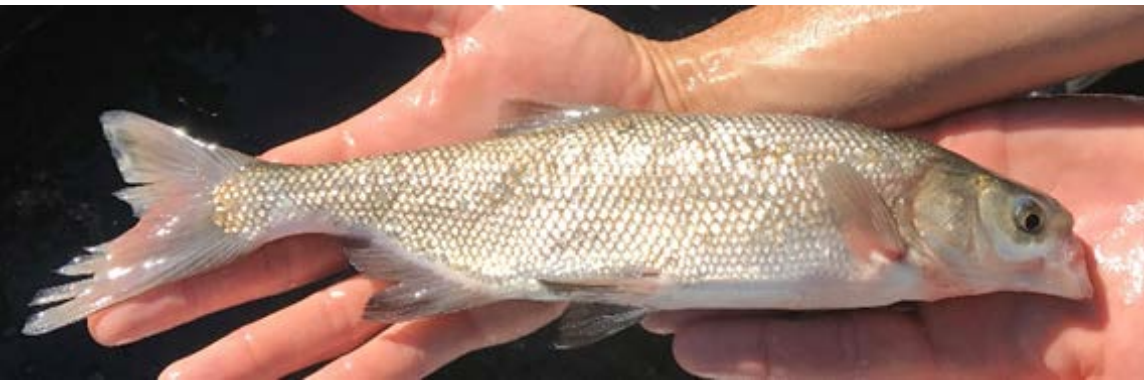
Fig. 16 The pugheaded Clear Lake hitch that was collected in 2017.

During a study of the habitat and status of Clear Lake hitch, two fish were encountered to have pugheadedness. Pugheadedness is a deformity in the skeleton resulting in a steep forehead, bulging eyeballs, and a reduced upper maxillary. Severe cases of pugheadedness may cause the fish to be unable to close their mouths. Pugheadedness can be seen early in development in fish, and many fish with the condition die as embryos. Fish that survive to adulthood have decreased fitness due to reduced foraging efficiency and inefficient respiration. On June 27, 2017, the first fish with a pugheadedness deformity was captured, and on June 25, 2019, the second fish with a pugheadedness deformity was captured.

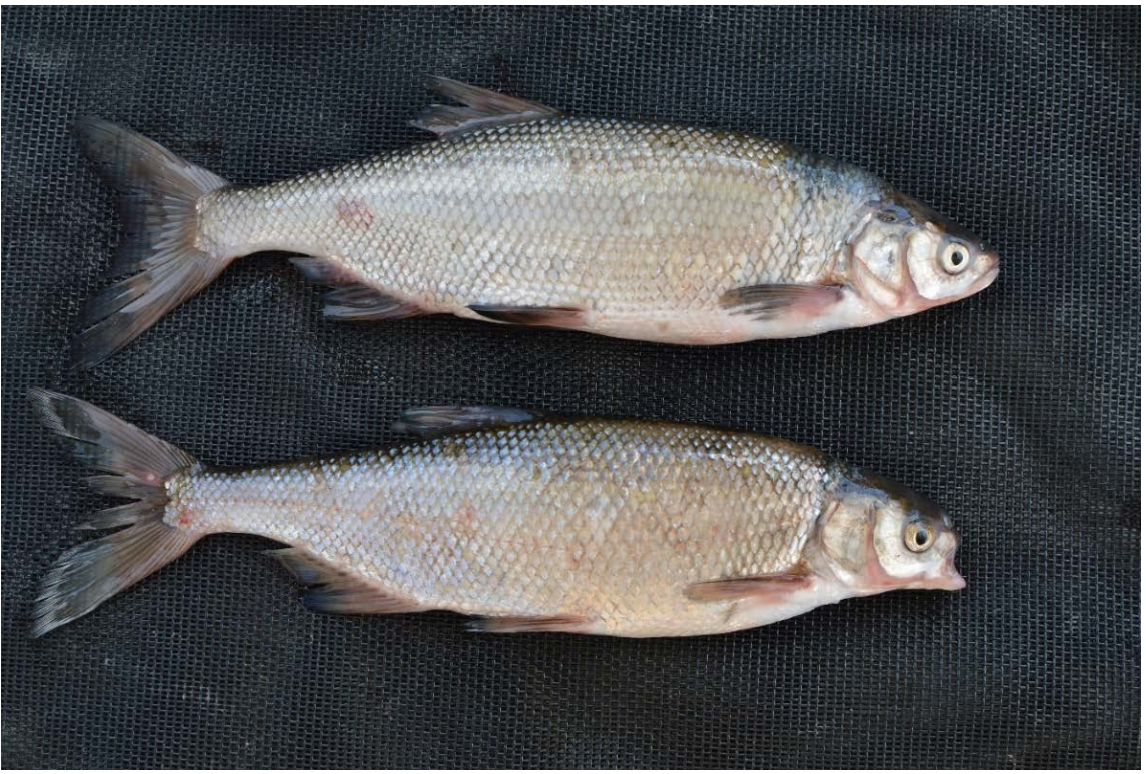
Fig. 17 The pugheaded Clear Lake hitch (fish on the bottom) that was collected in 2019 compared to a normal Clear lake hitch (fish on the top).

Speculated causes of pugheadedness include epigenetic changes due to environmental factors such as pollution, continuous low concentrations of dissolved oxygen, and high water temperatures. Clear Lake itself is contaminated with pollutants such as pesticides directly used on the lake to control aquatic weeds and runoff from nearby agriculture. Another pollutant in the lake is severe mercury contamination due to the operation of the Sulphur Bank Mercury Mine, which closed in 1957. Despite the closure of the mine, leakage from drainage pits has continued to add mercury into the lake.

== Relationship with humans ==
The Clear Lake hitch is known as "chi" to local Pomo tribes. In the past, the fish could be seen doing spawning runs in 14 streams feeding into Clear Lake. The spawning runs provided a reliable source of food for the Pomo Tribes. Members from the Pomo Tribe would hand-harvest and process Clear Lake hitch into fish jerky, which provided them a year-long sustenance. In the present day, spawning runs have been reduced to six streams, and the recent drought has resulted in zero spawning runs. Despite the Clear Lake hitch being treated as a species of high conservation importance, the U.S. Fish and Wildlife Service did not believe it would go extinct in the near future. The reluctance and slow decision-making of the U.S. Fish and Wildlife Service prompted the Center for Biological Diversity, along with the Big Valley Band of Pomo Indians, the Robinson Rancheria Band of Pomo Indians, the Scotts Valley Band of Pomo Indians, and the Habematolel Pomo of Upper Lake, to take its request for emergency listing to Deb Haaland. In 2022, Interior Secretary Deb Haaland was urged to use her emergency powers and invoke the federal Endangered Species Act on behalf of the Clear Lake hitch.

More than a dozen agencies are collaborating on a plan to save the Clear Lake hitch. The California Department of Water and the State Water Resources Control Board have helped to install equipment that will monitor the surface and groundwater in creeks and creekside wells. Lake Country Water Resources and the California Conservation Corps are clearing lots of debris from the waterway to improve the water flow, the habitat, and reduce streambank erosion. U.S. Fish and Wildlife Service and the California Department of Fish and Wildlife (CDFW) allocated millions of dollars to identify and dismantle barriers that prevent the fish from migrating, complete a conservation strategy, and fund the Robinson Ranchería Environmental Protection department to locate and remove invasive carp that eat the eggs and young of the Clear Lake hitch. Spring in 2023 was a substantial wet spring, allowing Clear Lake hitch to migrate; however, the heavy flow of water caused the fish to be swept over streambanks and stranded in ditches and fields. Landowners reported areas where the fish were stranded to tribal staff and CDFW, who rescued them, resulting in 26,000 fish being rescued.
