= Love Decree =

- Origin: Edinburgh, Scotland
- Genres: Pop Soul
- Labels: BMG Records
- Past members: Robin Gow; Grant Macintosh; Gordon Gow

Love Decree were a Scottish pop soul band composed of Robin Gow (keyboards/songwriter), Grant Macintosh (vocals/songwriter), Gordon Gow (percussion). They are best known for their single "Something so Real", which featured in the McEwan's Lager commercial, "Chinheads" in 1988.

== Formation ==
Formed early in 1987 in Edinburgh, the band was originally a seven piece, composed of vocals, keyboards, bass guitar, lead guitar, drums, percussion and saxophone. Following a meeting with a potential manager, the band moved to a rehearsal/residential base in Barrhead which resulted in the need for both the singer, drummer and guitar player to be replaced. A radio-based promotion campaign to find suitable replacements was launched and after several weeks of auditions, Grant Macintosh was chosen as vocalist, Paul Kane as drummer and Allan Harvey as Lead Guitarist. Thereafter followed weeks of Intensive rehearsal and song-writing, followed by a small UK tour to debut the band. The band later added session player Kenny Hutchison (Bass) to their line-up.

== "Something So Real" and the McEwan's "Chinheads" television advertisement ==
In 1988, having been together for a relatively short time, a deal was secured with McEwan's Lager to record one of their original tracks for use on an upcoming television advert, "Chinheads". The award-winning advert, featuring a fictional and quirky "upside-down" rock/soul band, was directed by Steve Barron (director of Michael Jackson's "Billie Jean", A-Ha's "Take On Me", and Teenage Mutant Ninja Turtles) and featured an edited version (70 seconds) of the track "Something So Real". Recorded by the band at London's Mayfair Mews recording studio, the track was produced by Scottish producer B.A.Robertson and engineered by Kevin Whyte. The advert, released in 1989, caused quite a stir with its unique visuals and extremely catchy soundtrack. McEwan's were inundated with requests for information regarding who the music was by and if it could be purchased. McEwans chose to release the advert nationally and included ITV and Sky in its coverage, including London for the first time ever. A massive poster campaign was launched nationally to further promote the advert, again including London.

The 70 second version was later replaced by an edited and slightly sped-up 40 second version in 1990. By 1989, it was clear there was a huge demand for the track and the band, now a three-piece consisting of Grant (Vocals), Robin (Keyboards) and Gordon (Percussion), quickly sought to secure a deal with BMG Records.

"Something So Real"

Single by Love Decree
- B-side: "Mister Ego - Starring Role - Something So Real [Extended Version]"
- Released: 9 September 1989
- Recorded: 1988
- Genre: Pop Soul
- Label: BMG [Ariola]
- Songwriter(s): Robin Gow & Grant Macintosh
- Producer(s): Robin Gow

== Chart performance ==
A single was subsequently released on 9 September 1989, peaking at No.61 in the UK Singles Chart. In Scotland, however, it reached No.1, outselling Black Box's "Ride On Time". The track "Something So Real" was produced by Robin Gow at REL Studios in Edinburgh and released through BMG Records on 7", 12" and CD Single formats and included the additional tracks "Mister Ego", "Starring Role" and an extended version of "Something So Real". These additional tracks were recorded at CaVa Studios in Glasgow and were produced by Robin Gow and engineered by Gordon Rintoul.

== Track listings ==
7" Single

1. Something So Real (3:29)
2. Mister Ego (3:58)

12" Single

1. Something So Real [Extended Version] (4:50)
2. Mister Ego (3:58)
3. Starring Role (5:34)

CD Single

1. Something So Real (3:29)
2. Mister Ego (3:58)
3. Starring Role (5:34)
4. Something So Real [Extended Version] (4:50)
