= Río Chira =

Río Chira may refer to:

- Chira River, a river in northern Peru
- Río Chira (ship), a Norwegian motor vessel
- BAP Río Chira (PC 12), a Peruvian Navy motor gunboat previously used by the United States Navy
