= Chirui =

Chirui may refer to several places in Romania:

- Băile Chirui, a village in the commune Lueta, Harghita County
- Chirui, a tributary of the Miletin in Botoșani County
- Chirui (Vârghiș), a tributary of the Vârghiș in Harghita County
