= Chir, Bavanat =

Chir چير
- Village
- Location within Iran
- Coordinates: 30°21′39″N 53°50′06″E
- Country: Iran
- Province: Fars
- County: Bavanat
- Bakhsh: Central
- Rural District: Sarvestan

Population (2006)
  - Total: 453
- Time zone: UTC+3:30 (IRST)
  - Summer (DST): UTC+4:30 (IRDT)

Chir (Persian: چير, also Romanized as Chīr; also known as Deh-e Āqā Moḩammad Ja‘farkhān and Deh-e Āqā Moḩammad Ja‘farkhān) is a village in Sarvestan Rural District, in the Central District of Bavanat County, Fars province, Iran. At the 2006 census, its population was 453, in 123 families.
