= Chir, Kohgiluyeh and Boyer-Ahmad =

Chir چير
- Village
- Location within Iran
- Coordinates: 30°41′29″N 50°39′53″E
- Country: Iran
- Province: Kohgiluyeh and Boyer-Ahmad
- County: Kohgiluyeh
- Bakhsh: Central
- Rural District: Dehdasht-e Gharbi

Population (2006)
  - Total: 574
- Time zone: UTC+3:30 (IRST)
  - Summer (DST): UTC+4:30 (IRDT)

Chir (Persian: چير, also Romanized as Chīr; also known as Chīr Bard-e Khāgak, Chīr Bard Khāyak, and Chīr-e Soflá) is a village in Dehdasht-e Gharbi Rural District, in the Central District of Kohgiluyeh County, Kohgiluyeh and Boyer-Ahmad Province, Iran. At the 2006 census, its population was 574, in 124 families.
