= Chir, West Azerbaijan =

Chir چير
- Village
- Location within Iran
- Coordinates: 38°52′47″N 44°48′55″E
- Country: Iran
- Province: West Azerbaijan
- County: Chaypareh
- Bakhsh: Central
- Rural District: Bastam

Population (2006)
  - Total: 125
- Time zone: UTC+3:30 (IRST)
  - Summer (DST): UTC+4:30 (IRDT)

Chir (Persian: چير, also Romanized as Chīr; also known as Chīr Kord) is a village in Bastam Rural District, in the Central District of Chaypareh County, West Azerbaijan Province, Iran. At the 2006 census, its population was 125, in 21 families.
