= Chir, Mamasani =

Chir چير
- Village
- Location within Iran
- Coordinates: 30°18′05″N 51°43′17″E
- Country: Iran
- Province: Fars
- County: Mamasani
- Bakhsh: Central
- Rural District: Jowzar

Population (2006)
  - Total: 75
- Time zone: UTC+3:30 (IRST)
  - Summer (DST): UTC+4:30 (IRDT)

Chir (Persian: چير, also Romanized as Chīr; also known as Deh Chīr) is a village in Jowzar Rural District, in the Central District of Mamasani County, Fars province, Iran. At the 2006 census, its population was 75, in 25 families.
