= Chemmappilly =

Place in Thrissur District, Kerala, India

Coordinates: 10.426°N 76.116°E

Chemmappilly is a place in Thrissur District, Kerala, India.

== Images ==
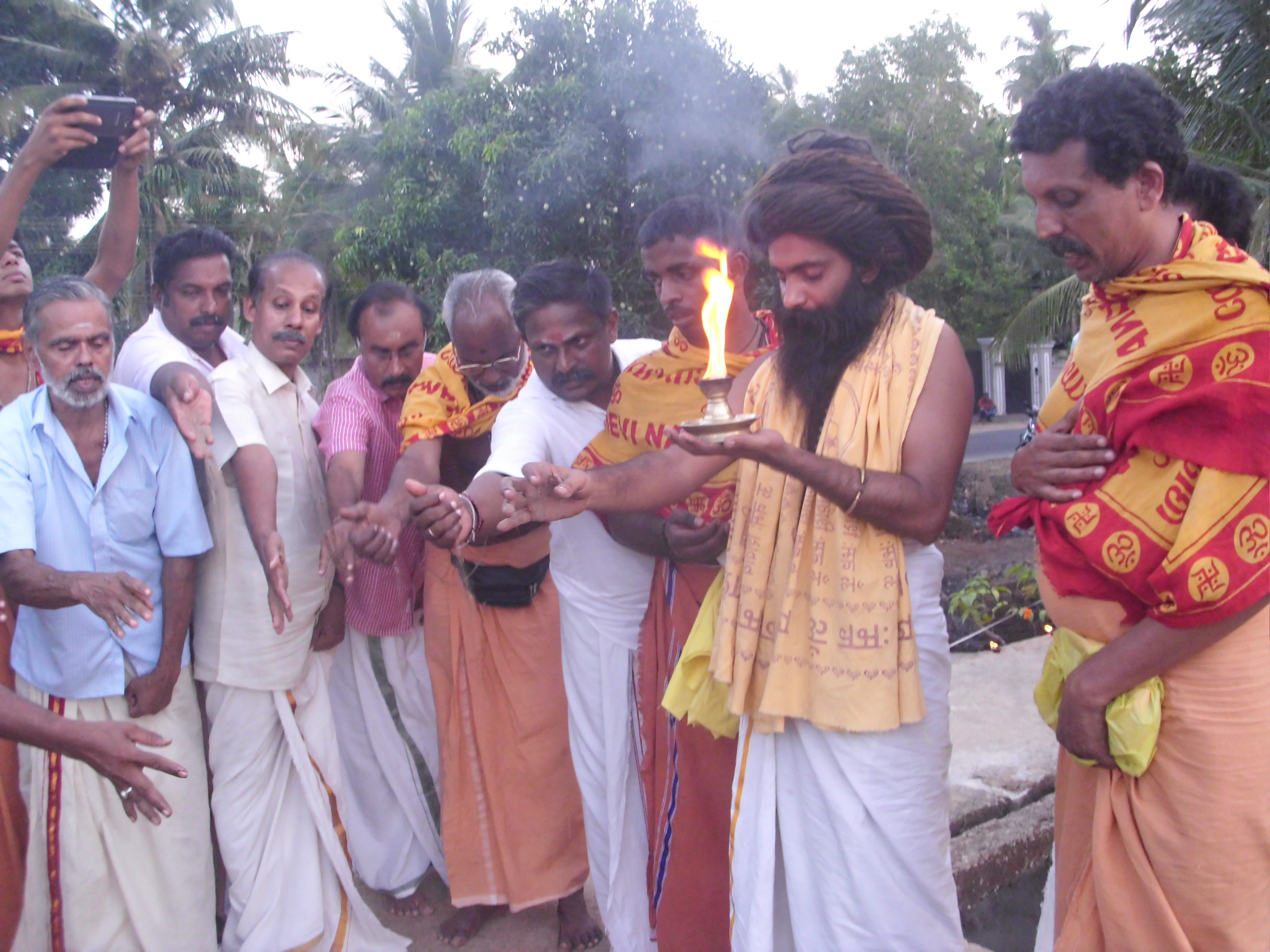
Sethubandhana Vandanam at Sreeranan Chira

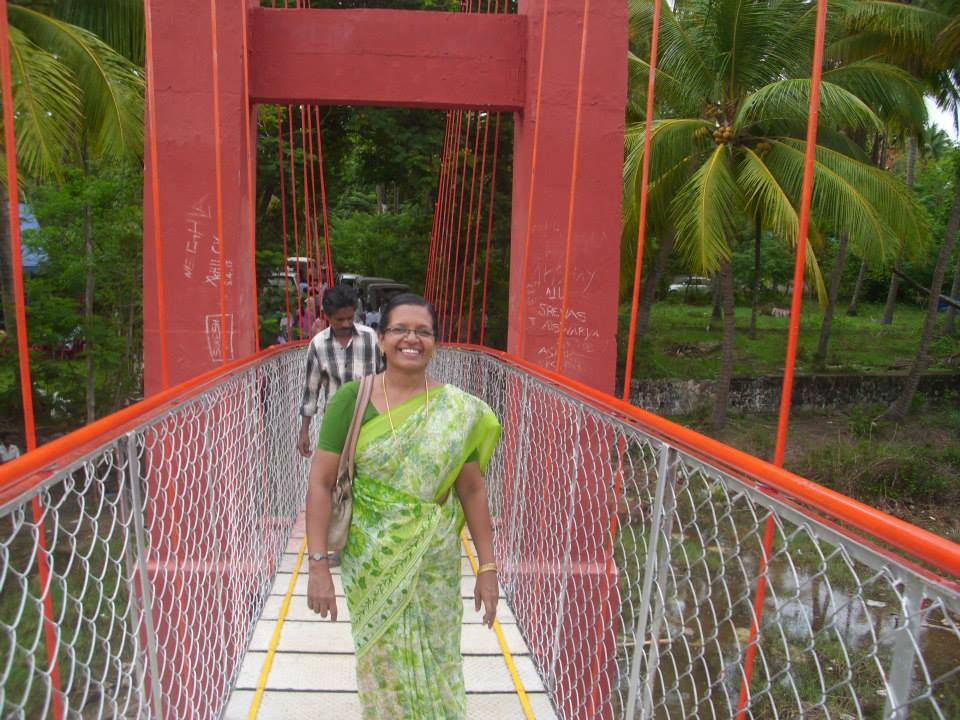
Hanging bridge at Chemmappilly

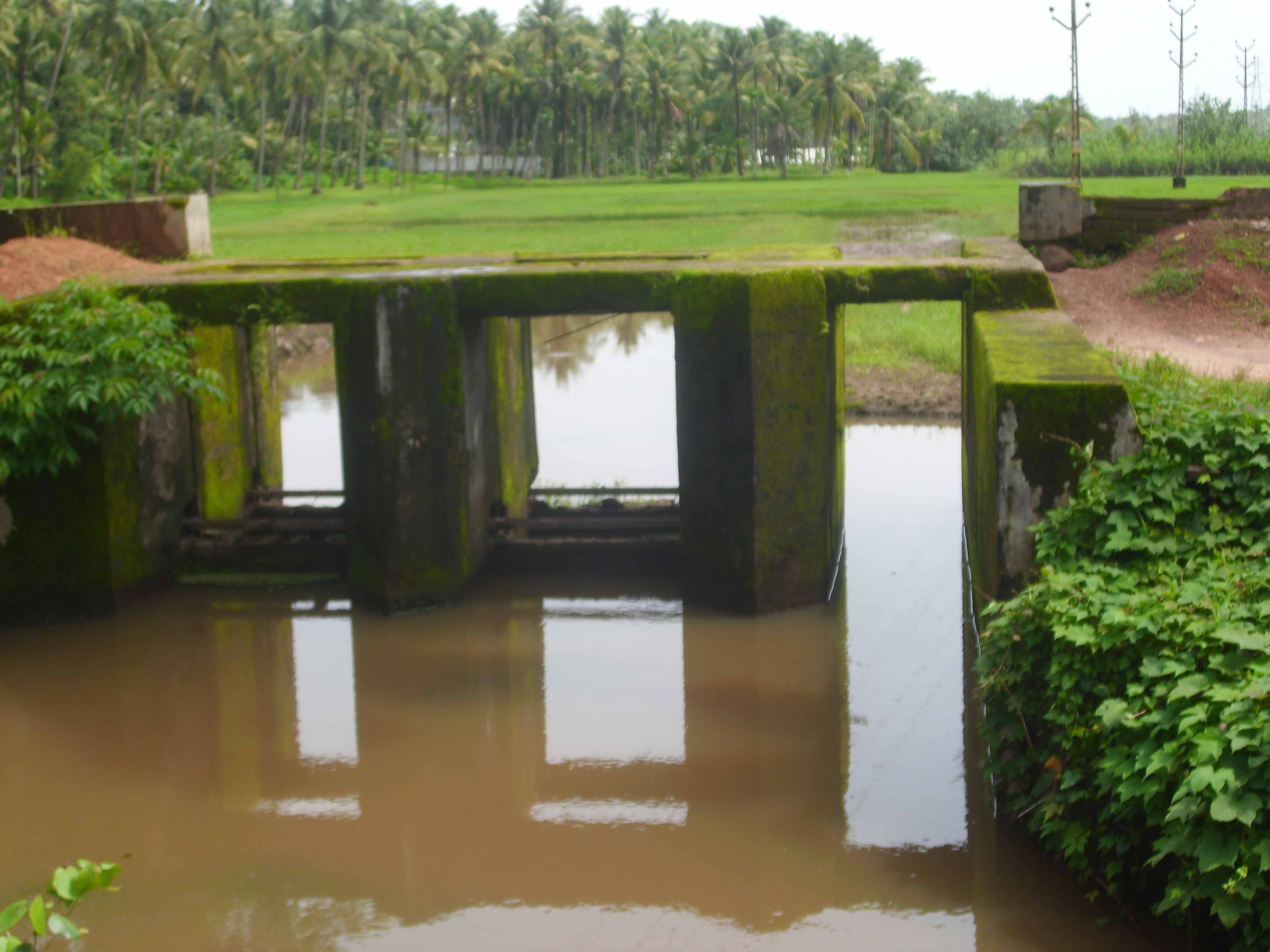
Sreeraman chira, Chemmappilly
