= Chik (name) =

Chik is a given name and surname. Notable people known by this name include the following:

== Given name ==
- Chik Tormenta (born 1984), Mexican luchadora
- Chik Patrick Yue, Hong Kong engineer
- Chik Mohamad Yusuf (1907–1975), Malaysian politician

=== Portion of given name ===
- Chun Chik-yu (1859–1936), Chinese-Hawaiian businessman
- Kyung-Chik Han (1902–2000), Korean pastor
- Lee Chik-yuet (born 1954), Hong Kong social worker, lawyer, politician and businessman
- Tam Chik Sum (fl. 2010–2016), Hong Kong wheelchair fencer

== Surname ==
- Jaime Chik (born 1962), Hong Kong actress
- Jonathan Chik (fl. 1992–present), Hong Kong television producer, director, and writer

== Patronymic ==
- Rosiah Chik (1931–2006), Malay singer
- Sabbaruddin Chik (1941–2021), Malaysian politician

=== Portion of patronymic ===
- Abdul Rahim Thamby Chik (born 1950), Malaysian politician
- Muhammad Bakhtiar Wan Chik (born 1965), Malaysian politician
- Raja Nong Chik (born 1953), Malaysian politician

== Middle name ==
- Bulu Chik Baraik (fl. 2011–present), Indian politician
- Teungku Chik di Tiro (1836–1891), Indonesian guerrilla fighter

== See also ==
- Chi (surname)
- Chia (surname)
- Chic (nickname)
- Chica (name)
- Chick (nickname)
- Chick (surname)
- Chicka (disambiguation)
- Chickie (nickname)
- Chik (disambiguation)
- Chika (Igbo given name)
- Chika (Japanese given name)
- Chika (general name)
- Chip (name)
- Chin (surname)
- Chink (nickname)
- Chiu
