= Chika =

Chika may refer to:

== People ==
- Chika (Igbo given name)
- Chika (Japanese given name)
- Chika (general name)
- Chika (footballer) (born 1979), Brazilian defender
- Chika (rapper), Jane Chika Oranika, American rapper

== Other uses ==
- Chika (software), a Japanese female vocal for Vocaloid 3
- Chika Entertainment Inc., a Chilean record label

== See also ==
- Chaka (disambiguation)
- Chia (disambiguation)
- Chiba (disambiguation)
- Chica (disambiguation)
- Chicka (disambiguation)
- Chikan (disambiguation)
- Chima (disambiguation)
- China (disambiguation)
- Chita (disambiguation)
