= Chicky =

Chicky is a nickname. Notable people associated with this name include the following:

== Nickname ==
- Chicky Arad, nickname of Roy Arad (born 1977), Israeli poet, singer, script-writer, artist and political activist
- Chicky Starr, is the stagename of José Anibal Laureano Colón (born 1958), Puerto Rican professional wrestler and manager

== Fictional characters ==
- Chicky, a yellow chick in the French cartoon Where's Chicky?
- Chicky, the lead female character in the 2020 Canadian Screen Award nominated film adaptation Bone Cage

== See also ==
- Chick (nickname)
- Chick (surname)
- Chicka (disambiguation)
- Chickie (nickname)
- Chucky (name)
- Chiky Ardil
- Chykie Brown
