= Chic (nickname) =

Chic is a nickname often associated with people named Charles. Notable people with this nickname include the following:

- Charles David Chic Anderson (1931–1979), American sportscaster and public address announcer specializing in horse racing
- Philip Desmond Chic Bates (born 1949), English former footballer and manager
- Robert Charles Chic Breese (1871–1929), Australian rules footballer
- Charles Thomas George Chic Brodie (footballer) (1937–2000), Scottish footballer
- Charles Gilchrist Chic Brodie (politician) (1944–2022), member of the Scottish Parliament, 2011–2016
- Chic Burlingame, nickname of Charles Burlingame (1949–2001), American pilot
- Chic Calderwood (1937–1966), Scottish boxer
- James Callaghan Chic Charnley (born 1963), Scottish footballer
- Chic Chocolate, born Antonio Xavier Vaz (1916 – May 1967), Goan trumpeter
- Henry Ciccarone (1938–1988), American college lacrosse Hall-of-Fame head coach
- Charles Chic Cicero (born 1936), American author
- Charles Chic Donovan Kelley (born 1947), American professional wrestler
- Charles Chic Geatons (1907–1970), Scottish footballer
- Charles Wesley Chic Harley (1894–1974), American football player, member of the College Football Hall of Fame
- Mayer Jacob Chic Hecht (1928–2006), US Senator from Nevada
- Anthony Robert Chic Henry, (1946–2022), Tasmanian car enthusiast
- Harold Ogden Chic Johnson (1891–1962), half of the American comedy team of Olsen and Johnson
- Cecil Chic Littlewood (1930–2015), New Zealand television entertainer and actor
- Charles Chic McLelland (1953–2020), Scottish former football player and manager
- Charles Chic McSherry (born 1958), Scottish rock guitarist, songwriter and businessman
- Charles Campbell Chic Milligan (1930–2020), Scottish former footballer
- Charles Thomas McKinnon Chic Murray (1919–1985), Scottish comedian and actor
- Charles Myron Chic Murray (politician) (1914–1984), Canadian politician
- Charles "Chic" Sale (1885–1936), American actor and vaudevillian
- Charles Eber Chic Stone (1923–2000), American comic book artist
- Charlie Thomson (1930–2009), Scottish football goalkeeper
- Murat Bernard Chic Young (1901–1973), American cartoonist and creator of the comic strip Blondie

== See also ==
- Chi (surname)
- Chia (surname)
- Chic (disambiguation)
- Chica (name)
- Chick (nickname)
- Chick (surname)
- Chicka (disambiguation)
- Chickie (nickname)
- Chik (name)
- Chin (surname)
- Chip (name)
- Chiu
