= Chiba (surname) =

Origin
- Language: Japanese

Chiba (written: ちば, 千葉, 地場) is a Japanese surname. Notable people with the surname include:

- Akio Chiba (千葉 亜喜生; 1943–1984), Japanese manga artist
- Akira Chiba (born 1959), president of The Pokémon Company
- Chiemi Chiba (千葉 千恵巳; born 1975), Japanese voice actress and singer
- Ginko Chiba (千葉 吟子; born 1938), Japanese retired gymnast, Olympic bronze medalist
- Haruhisa Chiba (千葉 晴久; 1951–2006), Japanese alpine skier
- Hayato Chiba (千葉 逸人; born 1982), Japanese mathematician
- Hiromu Chiba (千葉 大舞; born 2005), Japanese footballer
- Hirotaka Chiba (千葉 皓敬; born 1992), Japanese former actor and voice actor
- Isshin Chiba (千葉 一伸; born 1968), Japanese voice actor
- Kanta Chiba (千葉 寛汰; born 2003), Japanese professional footballer
- Kaori Chiba (千葉 香織; born 1981), Japanese field hockey player
- Kazuhiko Chiba (千葉 和彦; born 1985), Japanese footballer
- Kazuo Chiba (千葉 和雄; 1940–2015), Japanese Aikido teacher
- Keiko Chiba (千葉 景子; born 1948), Japanese former Minister of Justice
- Kenro Chiba (千葉 建郎; born 1937), Japanese rower
- Kiyokazu Chiba (千葉 潔和; born 1961), Japanese manga artist
- Koichi Chiba (千葉 耕市; 1931–2001), Japanese voice actor and sound director
- Masako Chiba (千葉 真子; born 1976), Japanese long-distance runner
- Mone Chiba (千葉 百音; born 2005), Japanese figure skater
- Reiko Chiba (千葉 麗子; born 1975), Japanese actress
- Remina Chiba (千葉 玲海菜; born 1999), Japanese professional footballer
- Ryohei Chiba (千葉 涼平; born 1984), Japanese singer
- Ryōko Chiba (千葉 涼子; born 1980), Japanese professional shogi player
- Saeko Chiba (千葉 紗子; born 1977), Japanese voice actress
- Sakio Chiba (千葉 幸生; born 1979), Japanese professional shogi player
- Shigeru Chiba (baseball) (千葉 茂; 1919–2002), Japanese baseball player and manager
- Shigeru Chiba (千葉 繁; born 1954), also known as Masaharu Maeda (前田 正治), Japanese voice actor
- Shōya Chiba (千葉 翔也; born 1995), Japanese voice actor
- Shūsaku Narimasa Chiba (千葉 周作 成政; 1794–1856), founder of the Hokushin Itto school of swordsmanship
- Sonny Chiba (1939–2021), also known as Shin'ichi Chiba (千葉 真一), Japanese actor and martial artist
- Sonoko Chiba (千葉 園子; born 1993), Japanese footballer
- Susumu Chiba (千葉 進歩; born 1970), Japanese voice actor
- Takahito Chiba (千葉 貴仁; born 1984), Japanese former footballer
- Teikan Chiba (千葉 貞幹; 1852–1913), Japanese prosecutor, judge, politician
- Teisuke Chiba (千葉 禎介; 1917–1965), Japanese photographer
- Tetsuya Chiba (千葉 徹彌; 1939–2026), Japanese manga artist
- Yasunobu Chiba (千葉 泰伸; born 1971), Japanese former football player and manager
- Yudai Chiba (千葉 雄大; born 1989), Japanese actor and model
- Yuki Chiba (千葉 雄喜; born 1990), Japanese rapper, singer, songwriter

== Other people ==
- Saïd Chiba (born 1970), Moroccan footballer

== Fictional characters ==
- Mamoru Chiba, male character from the Sailor Moon anime and manga series
- Atsuko Chiba, main character of the 2006 film Paprika
- Kazunobu Chiba, character in the manga series Case Closed
- Kirino Chiba, a fictional character from anime Bamboo Blade
- Ryūnosuke Chiba (千葉 龍之介), a character in the Assassination Classroom anime and manga

== See also ==
- Chiba clan, a Japanese clan
- Chiba Prefecture, a prefecture located in the Kantō region
- Chika (general name)
- Chica (name)
- Chyba, another surname
