= Chip (name) =

Chip is an English given name and nickname in the United States, which is often a diminutive form of Charles or Christopher. Notable people referred to by this name include the following:

== People ==
=== Nickname ===
- Chip Ambres (born 1979), American baseball player
- Chip Arndt (born 1966), American gay activist and reality show winner
- Charles L. Babcock (born 1949), American attorney
- Chip Banks (born 1959), American football player
- Chip Beall (born 1948), American television host
- Chip Beck (born 1956), American golfer
- Chip Berlet (1949–2026), American investigative journalist and photojournalist
- Charles E. Bohlen (1904–1974), American diplomat
- Chip Bok (born 1952), American editorial cartoonist
- Chip Brian (born 1970), American financial services, information technology, and construction entrepreneur
- Chip Caray (born 1965), American sports announcer
- Chip Carter, son of former US President Jimmy Carter
- Chip Cipolla (1926–1994), American sports announcer
- Chip Coulter (born 1945), American baseball player
- Chip Cravaack (born 1959), American politician and former US Navy pilot
- Chip Damiani (1945–2014), American drummer
- Chip Davis (born 1947), American musician and composer
- Chip Dicks (born 1951), American politician and lobbyist
- Chip Dunham, American cartoonist
- Chip Engelland (born 1961), American basketball player and coach
- Charles Esten (born 1965), American comedian, actor and singer
- Chip Fields (born 1951), American singer, actress and television director, mother of Alexis
- Chip Flaherty, American film producer, publisher, and executive at SkyPath Media
- Chip Ganassi (born 1958), American former racecar driver and current racecar owner
- Chip Glass (born 1971), American baseball player
- Chip Goodyear (born 1958), American businessman and member of the Goodyear family
- C. W. Grafton (1909–1982), American crime novelist
- Chip Hale (born 1964), American baseball player and coach
- Chip Hanauer (born 1954), American motorboat racer
- Chip Hawkes, bassist in The Tremeloes and father of Chesney Hawkes
- Chip Healy (1947–2019), American football player
- Chip Ingram (born 1954), Christian pastor, author, and orator
- Chip Jett (born 1974), American professional poker player
- Chip Johannessen, American TV producer, writer and editor
- Chip Kelly (born 1963), American football coach
- Chip Kidd (born 1964), American graphic designer, author and editor
- Chip Lohmiller (born 1966), American football player
- Alfred C. Marble Jr. (1936–2017), American Episcopal bishop
- Chip Minton (born 1969), American former bobsledder and former professional wrestler
- Chip Monck (born 1939), American lighting designer and master of ceremonies at the 1969 Woodstock Festival
- Chip Mosher (1947–2021), American columnist, novelist, actor
- Chip Myers (1945–1999), American football player
- Chip Pashayan (born 1941), American politician
- Chip Peterson (born 1987), American long-distance swimmer
- Chip Pickering (born 1963), American politician
- Chip Reese (1951–2007), American poker player
- L. W. Robert Jr. (1889–1976), college athlete, engineer and government official
- Chip Rogers (born 1968), American former politician
- Chip Rosenbloom (born 1964), American filmmaker, director and producer, co-owner and Vice Chairman of the St. Louis Rams football franchise
- Chip Roy (born 1972), American politician
- Chip Skowron, American financier and convicted fraudster
- Chip Taylor (1940–2026), American songwriter and singer
- Chip Trayanum (born 2002), American football player
- Chip Wilson (born 1955), Canadian-American billionaire, businessman and philanthropist
- Chip Zien (born 1947), American stage and television actor

=== Given name ===
- Chip Bailey (1921–1963), New Zealand communist, taxi driver and trade unionist
- Chip Baltimore (born 1966), member of the Iowa House of Representatives
- Chip Bell, author, keynote speaker, and consultant
- Chip Bolcik (born 1958), American voice-over announcer and narrator
- Chip Chalmers, theater and television director
- Chip Chinery (born 1964), American comedian and actor
- Chip Coffey (born 1954), American self-proclaimed psychic
- Chip Conley (born 1960), American hotelier, hospitality entrepreneur, author, and speaker
- Chip Cox (born 1983), Canadian football linebacker
- Chip Deffaa, American author, jazz historian, playwright, songwriter, and director
- Chip Duncan (born 1955), American filmmaker, author, and photographer
- Chip Ferguson, former American football quarterback
- Chip Foose (born 1963), American automobile designer
- Chip Forrester, former chairman of the Tennessee Democratic Party
- Chip Foster, one half of Chip and Pepper
- Chip Franklin (born 1957), talk show host, writer, producer, comedian, and musician
- Chip Gaines (born 1974), American television star known for Fixer Upper on HGTV
- Chip Giller, American journalist and environmentalist
- Chip Gubera (born 1975), American film director and producer
- Chip Hall (born 1973), American television producer and writer
- Chip Hanna (born 1965), drummer of U.S. Bombs and One Man Army
- Chip Hayes (born 1956), American soap opera writer, producer and director
- Chip Heath, American bestselling author and speaker
- Chip Hines, Roman Catholic priest who co-hosts the CatholicTV program Spotlight
- Chip Hooper (born 1958), former tennis player
- Chip Huggins (born 1961), Republican member of the South Carolina House of Representatives
- Chip Jackson, American jazz double bass player
- Chip LaMarca, American politician

== Fictional characters ==
- Chip 'n' Dale, the Disney cartoon chipmunks
- Chip, from the PBS children's TV series Barney & Friends
- Chip, one of the two dung beetles in the Cartoon Network series Camp Lazlo
- Chip, a main character from the animated children's series Chip and Potato
- Chip (Flaked), the main character of the comedy series Flaked
- Chip Carson/C-17, the protagonist of the Not Quite Human film trilogy and novels
- Chip, from the Sega video game Sonic Unleashed
- Chip Chase, in the 1980s cartoon The Transformers
- Chip Crosswire, in the animated TV show Arthur
- Chip Douglas, one of My Three Sons in the 1960-72 TV show
- Chip Flagston, son of the titular characters in the comic strip Hi and Lois
- Chip, a male wasp in the 1998 DreamWorks Animation animated film Antz
- Chip Hazard, the toy antagonist in the Gavin Scott-wrote film Small Soldiers
- Chip Hilton, the central character in a series of 24 sports novels
- Chip Lowell, on the sitcom Kate & Allie
- Chip Martin, the Schizoid Man in comic books published by Marvel Comics
- Chip Medford, in the 1994 TV movie Revenge of the Nerds IV: Nerds in Love
- Chip Potato, from the British animated short series Small Potatoes
- Chip Potts, in the Disney film Beauty and the Beast and other media
- Chip Skylark, the minor popstar character of the Nickelodeon animated TV show The Fairly OddParents
- Chip Robinson, in The Magic Key (Oxford Reading Tree) book series and TV adaptation
- Chip Whistler, the main antagonist of the Disney Channel animated series Big City Greens

== See also ==
- Chip (disambiguation)
- Chips (nickname)
- Chippy (nickname)
- Chipper (nickname)
