= Choki =

Chōki or Choki is a Japanese name that may refer to:

- Chatan Chōki (北谷 朝騎; 1703–1739), was a prince of the Ryukyu Kingdom
- Chōki Motobu (本部 朝基; 1870-1944), a martial artist
- Miyagawa Chōki (宮川 長亀; 1870-1944), Japanese artist
- Eishōsai Chōki (栄松斎 長喜), a.k.a. Momokawa Chōki, a designer of ukiyo-e Japanese woodblock prints
- Oroku Chōki (小禄 朝奇; 1676–1721), a prince of Ryukyu Kingdom
- Urasoe Chōki (浦添 朝憙; 1805–1854), a prince of the Ryukyu Kingdom
- Yonagusuku Chōki (与那城 朝紀), a prince of Ryukyu Kingdom
- Modern Choki Chokies, a Japanese pop band

Choki may also refer to:

- Choki, the kneeling posture
- Choki, town in central Ethiopia.

== See also ==
- Chiki
- Chocky, a 1968 science fiction novel
  - Chocky (TV series), a 1984 children's television drama based on the novel
