= Chika (Igbo given name) =

- Gender: Unisex

Origin
- Origin: Igbo
- Meaning: 'Chi is superior'
- Region of origin: Igboland

Other names
- Alternative spelling: Chike
- Variant form: Chukwuka

Chika (Chíkà) audio is an Igbo name meaning 'chi is supreme', it's made of the words chí 'personal deity', and kà 'greater, superior'

== People ==
- Chika (rapper), born Jane Chika Oranika, Nigerian-American rapper
- Chika Amalaha (born 1997), Nigerian weightlifter
- Chika Anadu, Nigerian filmmaker
- Chika Chukwumerije (born 1983), Nigerian taekwondo practitioner
- Victoria Chika Ezerim, Nigerian taekwondo practitioner
- Chika Ike (born 1985), Nigerian entertainer and businessperson
- Chika Lann, Nigerian filmmaker, actress, former model and television personality
- Matthias Chika Mordi (born 1967), Nigerian Financial Expert
- Chika Oduah (born 1986), Nigerian-American journalist
- Chika Okeke-Agulu (born 1966), Nigerian artist, art historian, art curator, and blogger
- Chika Okpala (born 1950), Nigerian comedian
- Chika Stacy Oriuwa, Nigerian-Canadian physician
- Eze Chika Philip (born 1993), Nigerian footballer
- Chika Unigwe (born 1974), Nigerian-born author
- Chika Wali (born 1990), Nigerian football player

== See also ==
- Chica (name)
- Chicka (disambiguation)
- Chika (general name)
- Chika (Japanese given name)
- Chika (disambiguation)
- Chiki
