= Chayka =

Chaika or Chayka, the word for gull in several Slavic languages, may refer to:

== People ==
- Chaika (surname), a Slavic surname (including a list of people with the name)
- Chaika or Chayka, the call sign for astronaut Valentina Tereshkova

== Places ==
- Kyiv Chaika Airfield, an airfield in Ukraine
- Chayka, Golden Sands, an area within the Golden Sands area, near the city of Varna, Bulgaria
- Chayka, Varna, a neighborhood in the city of Varna
- Chayka, Varna Province, a village in Provadiya Municipality, Varna Province, Bulgaria.
- Chayka, Atyrau, a village in western Kazakhstan

== Technology ==
- CHAYKA, a radio navigation system
- Chaika (car), an automobile made in the former Soviet Union
- Chaika (boat), a type of boat used by the Zaporozhian Cossacks
- Chaika (camera), a 35 mm camera made in the former Soviet Union
- Chaika watches, a women's brand of watch made in the former Soviet Union
- Chaika L-4, a Russian amphibious aircraft
- Polikarpov I-153 Chaika, a biplane fighter made by the former Soviet Union
  - Polikarpov I-15, predecessor of I-153
- Beriev Be-12, Soviet amphibious military aircraft

== Other uses ==
- 1671 Chaika, an asteroid
- The Seagull, a play by Anton Chekhov
- Chaika - The Coffin Princess, a Japanese light novel and anime series
- "Chaika", a 2016 song by Pussy Riot
- SC Chaika Petropavlivska Borshchahivka, a Ukrainian football club

== See also ==
- Czajka (disambiguation), Polish form
