= Competitiveness Council =

The Competitiveness Council may refer to

- the Competitiveness Council (COMPET), a configuration of the Council of the European Union.
- the Council on Competitiveness, an American non-profit organization based in Washington, D.C.
- the National Competitiveness Council (NCC), an independent policy advisory body in Ireland.
- the National Competitiveness Council of Nigeria (NCCN), is a private-public non-profit organisation in Nigeria.
- the North American Competitiveness Council (NACC), an official tri-national working group of the Security and Prosperity Partnership of North America (SPP).

== See also ==
- Competitiveness Policy Council, a former U.S. federal advisory committee to advise the President and the Congress on policies to promote competitiveness (began operation in 1991, and ceased operation in 1997).
