= Chiki =

Chiki is a given name and nickname. Notable people associated with this name include the following:

== Nickname ==
- Chiki (footballer), full name Christian Borrego Isabel (born 1996), Spanish footballer
- Chiki Meza, nickname of Jesús Meza (born 1986), Venezuelan footballer

== Given name ==
- Chiki Sampath (1920–1990), Trinidadian cricketer
- Chiki Sarkar, Indian book publisher

== See also ==
- Chik (name)
- Chika (Igbo given name)
- Chika (Japanese given name)
- Chika (name)
- Chiky Ardil
- Chibi (disambiguation)
- Chii (disambiguation)
- Chikai (disambiguation)
- Chili (disambiguation)
- Chini (disambiguation)
- Chiti (disambiguation)
- Chixi (disambiguation)
- Choki (disambiguation)
