= Chyba =

Chyba is a surname. Notable people with this name include:

- Andrew Chyba, Green party candidate for South Wales West in 2011 National Assembly for Wales election
- Christopher Chyba, American astrobiologist
- Jiří Chyba, Czech paracyclist, competed in 2011 UCI Para-cycling Track World Championships – Men's individual pursuit
- Monique Chyba (born 1969), control theorist at the University of Hawaii
- Pavel Chyba, Czech fisher, winner of 2010 World Fly Fishing Championships

== See also ==
- 7923 Chyba, an asteroid named after Christopher Chyba
- Chiba (surname)
- Chiba (disambiguation)
