= Czajka =

Czajka (lapwing in Polish) may refer to:

- Aero-Kros MP-02 Czajka, a 2000s Polish light aircraft
- Kocjan Czajka, a pre-war Polish glider
- ORP Czajka, Polish minesweepers
- SZD-18 Czajka, a post-war Polish glider
- WS-3 Czajka, a 1950s Polish light aircraft
- Czajka (surname)
- Chajka

== See also ==
- Chayka (disambiguation)
