= Cini =

Cini or CINI may refer to:

== People ==
=== Surname ===
- Antoinette Cini (born 1993), Maltese footballer
- Cristina Cini (born 1969), Italian football assistant referee
- Enrico Cini (died 1598), Roman Catholic prelate who served as Bishop of Alife
- Ezio Cini (born 1945), Italian sports shooter
- Francesco Cini (1610–1684), Roman Catholic prelate who served as Bishop of Macerata e Tolentino
- Giovan Battista Cini (1525–c. 1586), Italian playwright
- Joe Cini (born 1936), Maltese former footballer
- Lucas Cini (born 1999), Brazilian footballer
- Lyda Cini, Countess of Monselice (née. Borelli, 1884–1959), Italian actress of cinema and theatre
- Mathilde Cini (born 1994), French swimmer
- Paul Joseph Cini (born c. 1944), Canadian hijacker
- Reginald Cini (born 1970), professional footballer
- Ruggero Cini (1933–1981), Italian composer, producer, arranger and conductor
- Vittorio Cini (1885–1977), Italian industrialist and politician

=== Given name ===
- Cini Boeri (born 1924), Italian architect and designer

== Other uses ==
- Child In Need Institute (CINI), a humanitarian organisation
- Chini Lake (also called Tasik Cini), a series of lakes in Malaysia
- Cini Foundation, Venice, Italy
- CINI-FM, a radio station broadcasting on 95.3 MHz from Mistissini, Quebec, Canada
- Palazzo Cini, Venice, Italy

== See also ==
- Chini (disambiguation)
