= Chixi =

Chixi may refer to these places in China:

- Chixi Subdistrict, Lanxi, Zhejiang
- Chixi, Ningde, Fujian
- Chixi, Guangdong, in Taishan, Guangdong
- Chixi, Sichuan, in Nanjiang County, Sichuan
- Chixi, Cangnan County, Zhejiang
- Chixi Township, Fujian, in Yongtai County, Fujian
- Chixi Township, Jiangxi, in Jinxian County, Jiangxi

== See also ==
- Chiki
