= Chikan =

Chikan may refer to:

- Chikan (embroidery), a style of embroidery, common in India
- Chikan (body contact), sexual harassment, especially groping on public transport
- Super Chikan, an American blues musician
- Chikan District (赤坎区), Zhanjiang, Guangdong, China
- Chikan, Kaiping (赤坎镇), town in Guangdong, China
- Chikan, Iran, a village in Komehr Rural District, Fars Province, Iran

== See also ==
- Chika (disambiguation)
