= Czaja =

Czaja is a surname. Notable people with the surname include:

- Andrzej Czaja (born 1963), Polish Roman Catholic bishop
- Dominik Czaja (born 1995), Polish rower
- Emile Czaja (1909–1970), Australian-Indian wrestler
- Herbert Czaja (1914–1997), German politician
- Jakub Czaja (born 1980), Polish athlete
- Mario Czaja (born 1975), German politician
- Mary Czaja (born 1963), American businesswoman and politician
- Wiesław Czaja (born 1952), Polish volleyball player and coach
- Zbigniew Czaja (born 1958), Polish slalom canoeist
- Aleksandra Kosiorek (née Czaja; born 1985), Polish politician and jurist

== See also ==
- Czajka (disambiguation)
