= Onajite Okoloko =

Nigerian entrepreneur

Onajite Paul Okoloko
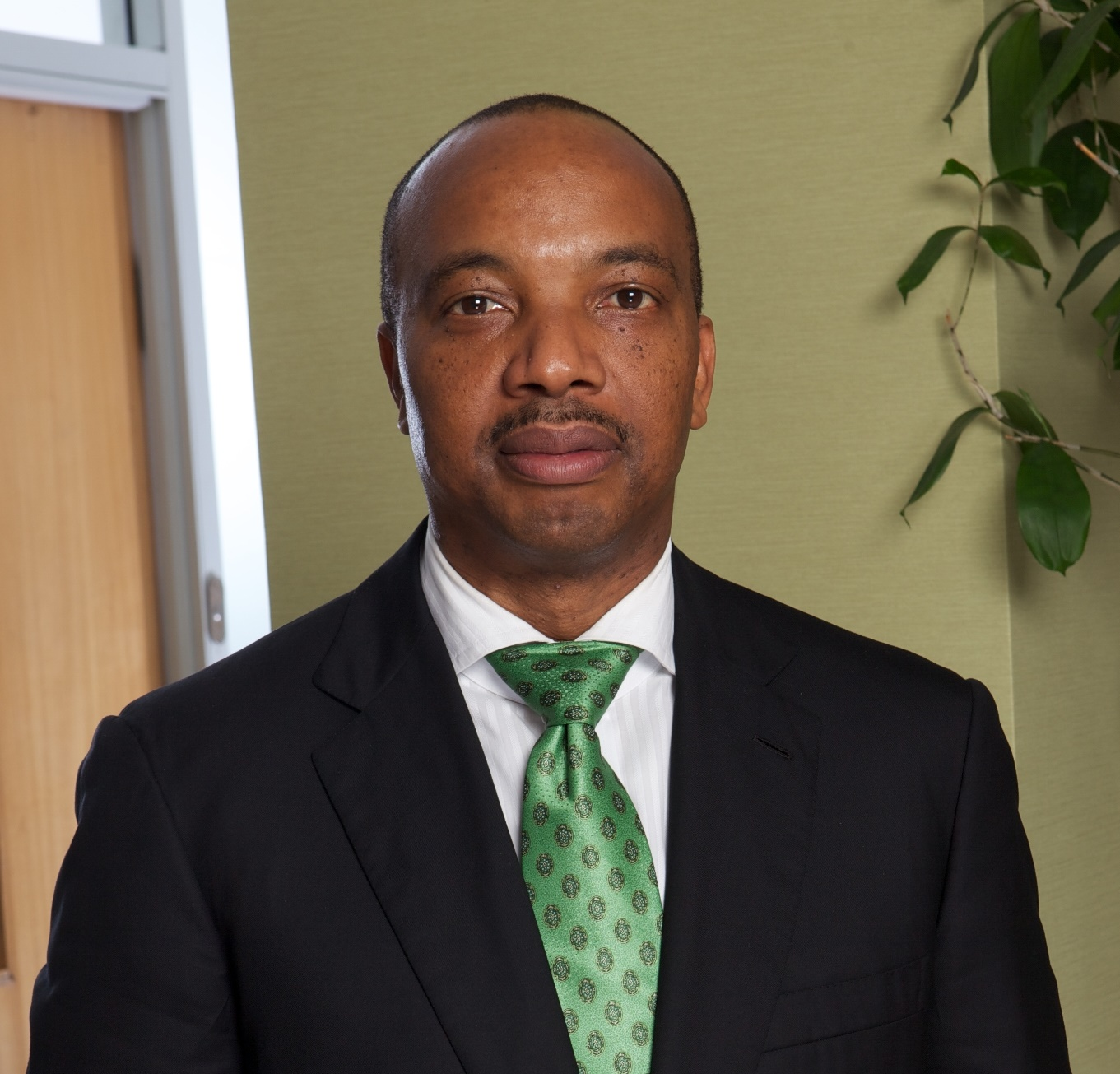
- Onajite Okoloko
- Born: February 22, 1966 (age 60); Nigeria
- Other name: Jite
- Citizenship: Nigeria
- Education: University of Benin; Harvard Business School
- Occupation: Entrepreneur
- Spouse: Not Married
- Children: 4

Onajite Paul Okoloko is a Nigerian businessman and entrepreneur with primary focus in the Oil & Gas and minerals & natural resources sectors. He is currently the Chairman and CEO of Bullcrest Mineral Resources Limited. He was the founder and pioneer Group Chief Executive Officer/Managing Director of Notore Chemical Industries (“Notore”) from inception to 2021. He was also the founder and pioneer Chairman of both Midwestern Oil & Gas (“Midwestern”) and Eroton Exploration & Production (“Eroton”).

== Early life and education ==
Mr. Okoloko was born in California, USA in 1966 and graduated from the University of Benin in 1986 with a bachelor's degree in Economics. He is also an alumnus of Harvard Business School.

== Early career ==
Mr. Okoloko lived and worked in the United States prior to his return to Nigeria in 1994 to create his first company (Ocean and Oil Limited). In the US, Mr. Okoloko worked in sales, marketing and business development. Mr. Okoloko's business ethos is driven by a desire for indigenous ownership and operating of business, developing local management talent and encouraging community participation.

== Companies ==
=== Bullcrest Mineral Resources Limited ===
Mr. Onajite Okoloko is currently the Chairman and Group Chief Executive Officer of Bullcrest Mineral Resources Limited. Bullcrest is an exploration, mining, mineral processing/beneficiation and minerals trading company with focus on minerals and metals such as Lithium Ore, Tin Ore, gold, columbite, tantalite (coltan), and rare earth metals (e.g. Niobium, Thorium, Monoxide, Ilmenite etc.) Mr. Okoloko is a pioneer investor in the mining industry, establishing foreign direct investments in the Nigerian Mining Space.

=== Ocean and Oil (Oando Group) ===
Mr. Okoloko was a founding member of the Ocean and Oil (Oando) Group alongside Adewale Tinubu and Omamofe Boyo. In 1994, what started out as an oil trading company eventually acquired Unipetrol Nigeria Plc during the Federal Government of Nigeria's privatization exercise in 2000. Ocean and Oil went on to acquire other assets, including Agip Nigeria Plc (the oil marketing arm of the ENI Group in Nigeria) and listed a subsidiary (Oando Plc) on the Nigerian and Johannesburg Stock Exchanges.

=== Notore ===
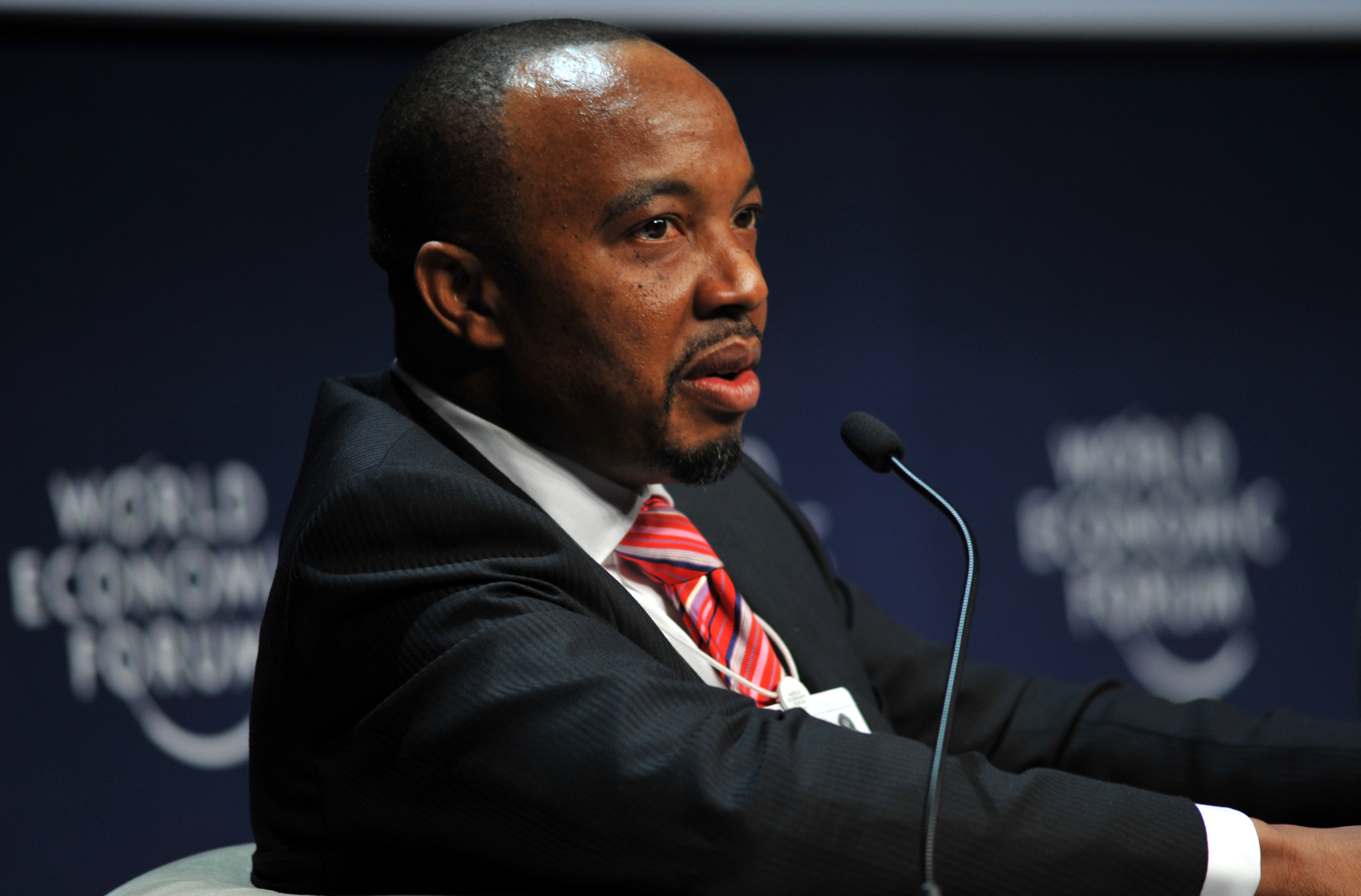
Onojite Okoloko, 2009 World Economic Forum on Africa

Mr. Okoloko was the Group Chief Executive Officer/Managing Director of Notore Chemical Industries Plc (“Notore”) from inception to 2021. Up until 2015, Notore was the only producer of urea fertiliser in Sub-Saharan Africa. Mr. Okoloko led a consortium of international and local investors to buy the defunct National Fertilizer Company of Nigeria (NAFCON) through a privatisation round led by the Bureau of Public Enterprises (BPE) between 2004 and 2005. NAFCON, which was originally built by KBR in the 1980s, was a flagship urea producer with over 100% efficiency until it was taken over by the Nigerian Government and subsequently shut down. Post-acquisition, Mr. Okoloko successfully completed the largest single loan syndication of Nigerian banks at the time, enabling Notore to raise US$222 million amongst 7 Nigerian financial institutions and completed a successful rehabilitation after it lay idle for more than 10 years.

Post-acquisition, Mr. Okoloko was instrumental in campaigning for reform in the Nigerian agricultural sector, lobbying the government to move away from a subsidy based system of fertiliser distribution to a comprehensive and sustainable methodology that encouraged self-sufficiency. His campaign was called “the African Green Revolution” with a Nigeria focus.

Mr. Okoloko guided Notore into offering different bag sizes of fertiliser to fit the different cash points of each farming group.

Notore developed a marketing and distribution network under Mr. Okoloko that covered Nigeria and was cited by several multilateral agencies where Notore's marketing efforts were credited in increasing fertiliser use.

Mr. Okoloko's investment vehicle ("Oyeladuk Global Concept Limited") the controlling shareholder of Notore ultimately divest 100% of his interest in Notore in 2025.

=== Midwestern Oil & Gas ===
Midwestern Oil & Gas Company Limited (“Midwestern”) commenced operation in 2003. Onajite Okoloko again led a consortium of investors in the company to participate in the marginal field licensing round during which they were awarded a 70% interest in the Umusadege oil field located in Oil Mining Lease (“OML”) 56, which is situated at the northern area of Delta State, Nigeria. Being a strong advocate for indigenous ownership and operatorship of hydrocarbon assets at a time when the space was dominated by International Oil Companies (“IoC’s), Mr. Okoloko was instrumental in putting together a management team of local professionals that would successfully operate the asset, having initially secured technical assistance from Mart Resources (a Canadian listed Natural Resources entity) in the early years of Midwestern, pursuant to Mr. Okoloko’s team which took over and continue to manage the asset to date.

Under Onajite Okoloko the Midwestern management team achieved significant production; first oil was achieved in the Umusadege Field in 2008 at flow rates of around 3,000 barrels (480 cubic metres) of oil per day from re-entry of the Umusadege-1 well. Midwestern hit peak production of over 20,000 barrels and as at today is producing approximately 12,000 barrels of oil per day through additional development drilling efforts. Over 21 wells have been drilled to date; the company has achieved success through its ability to peacefully coexist with the host communities. Mr. Okoloko eventually led Midwestern to acquire Mart Resources taking it private in 2016 thereby increase its ownership of the Umusadege oil field from 35% to 70%.

=== Eroton Exploration and Production Company ===
In 2014 Mr. Okoloko led a consortium of investors to acquire Shell's 45% working interest in OML 18 for $1.2Bn in a transaction that was awarded the “Global Structured Finance Transaction of 2014” by Trade & Forfaiting Review (TFR)

Between Eroton and Midwestern, Mr. Okoloko as Chairman oversaw a combined daily production capacity of approximately eighty thousand barrels of crude oil per day and 100mscf of natural gas production. In 2016, Mr. Okoloko led the investment of San Leon Energy, a UK listed AIM company, in OML 18 through Eroton.

== Recognition ==
- Mr. Okoloko is a member of the Nigerian Economic Summit (Policy Formulation) Group and the National Technical Working Group of the Nigeria Vision 2020. He is also a member of the President's Agricultural Transformation Implementation Council, which was inaugurated in May 2012.
- In 2014, Mr. Okoloko was appointed as an inaugural member of the Human Capital and Innovation Capacity Building Working Group of the National Competitiveness Council of Nigeria.
- In 2004, Mr. Okoloko was appointed a member of the Presidential Committee on Oil and Gas, as the sole representative of the private sector. This committee was instrumental in developing the current Oil and Gas policy for the country.
- In 2014, Mr. Okoloko was appointed to the Governing Council of the Delta State University Nigeria.
- Mr. Okoloko counts golf and cricket as his pastimes and is a former Chairman of the Delta State Cricket Board and a serving member of the National Cricket Association, where he is a keen advocate for the development of cricket in Nigeria.

== Personal life ==
He is the father of four children.
