= History of civil service in China =

The concept of a civil service first arose in mainland China during the Han dynasty, when efforts were made to base appointments solely on merit. During the Three Kingdoms Period, Cao Wei instituted the nine-rank system. The Sui dynasty founded the imperial examination system, which was further strengthened under the Tang dynasty and the Song dynasty. The system was finally abolished by the Qing government in 1905 as part of the New Policies reform package.

== History ==
Under the Zhou, official posts were provided to the aristocracy of the imperial and state clans and dispensed at their patronage. The Warring States and Qin Empire gradually replacing the varied ancient states with fairly standardized counties and disempowered much of the aristocracy in favor of officials appointed by the central governments, the early beginnings of the modern meritocratic civil service.

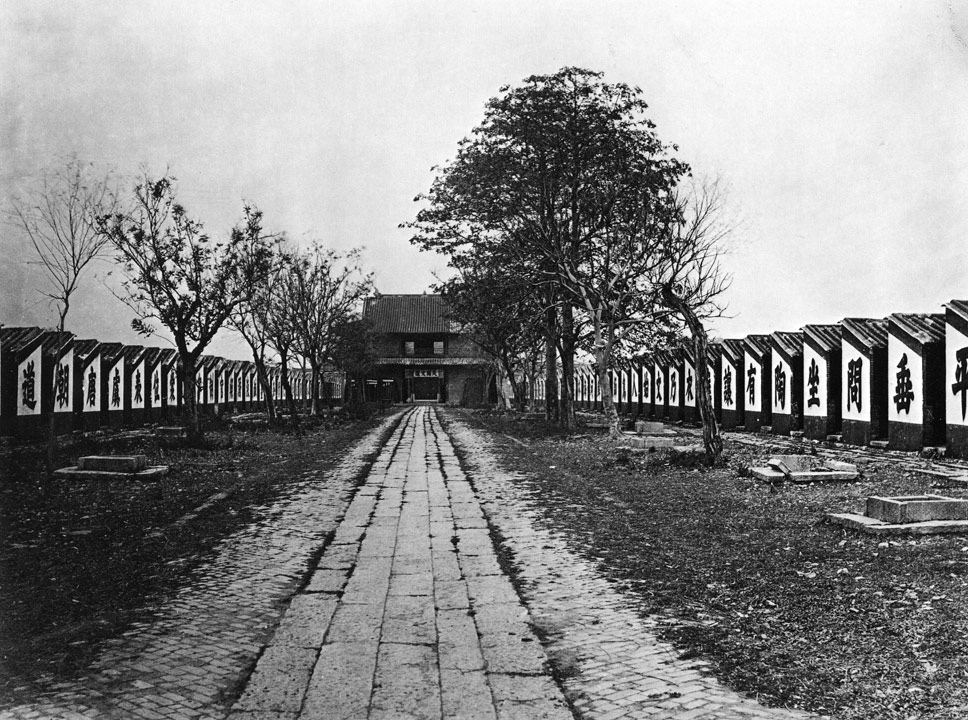
Imperial Civil Service Examination hall with 7500 cells in Guangdong, 1873

The Han initially maintained dozens of allied kingdoms, restored parts of the earlier aristocracy, and only directly staffed the commanderies around Chang'an in the west, but this system was quickly ended after widespread revolts and even defections to the Xiongnu. By 134 BC during the reign of the Wu Emperor, the bureaucracy was so widespread and needful of reliable manpower that the xiaolian system was instituted. Each commandery head was made responsible for nominating talented candidates, vouching—and becoming personally liable—for their unswerving filial piety (i.e. loyalty) and incorruptibility. Eventually public schools were provided for this purpose: the Imperial University under the Wu Emperor and local academies under the Ping Emperor in AD 3. Efforts were made to base appointments—especially in the military—solely on merit, but personal relationships continued to play a major role, particularly for the highest offices such as chancellor.

This tendency was only strengthened by the nine-rank system instituted by Cao Wei during the Three Kingdoms Period and continued under the Jin dynasty. Nominations were graded by an established rubric and overseen by professional controllers. In practice, points allocated on subjective criteria and those awarded for familial ties to earlier administrators entrenched a hereditary ruling class.

The civil service developed further with the imperial examination founded under the Sui. The imperial exam based on merit was designed under the Wen Emperor to select the best administrative officials for the state's bureaucracy. Despite the resumption of recommended candidates under the Yang Emperor, this system had a huge influence on both society and culture in Imperial China and was directly responsible for the creation of a class of scholar-bureaucrats who notionally held high rank for their personal merit regardless of their family pedigree. The succeeding Tang dynasty—particularly during the interregnum of the empress Wu Zetian's Zhou dynasty—expanded the exams' format and their importance. The system reached its apogee during the Song dynasty.

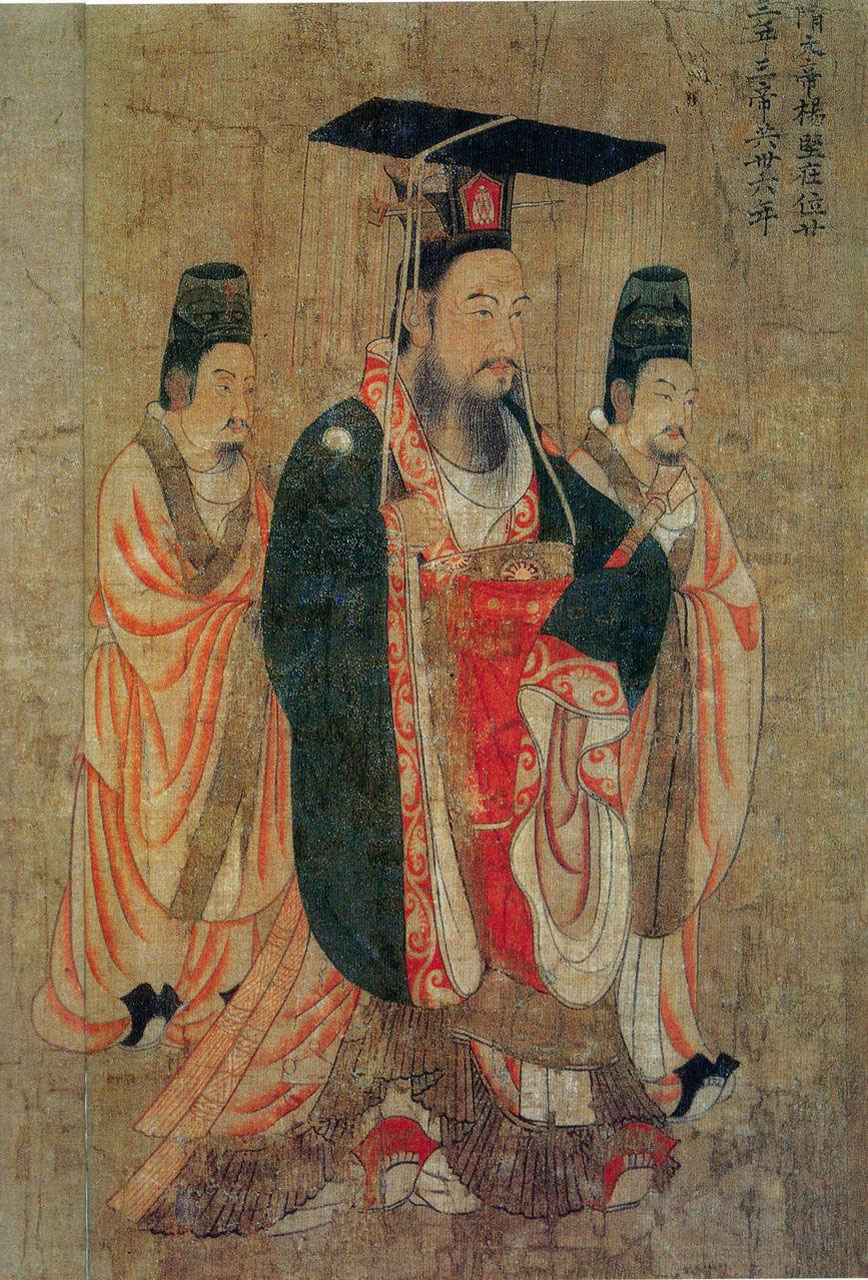
Emperor Wen of Sui (r. 581–604), who established the first civil service examination system in China; a painting by the chancellor and artist Yan Liben (600–673).

In theory, the Chinese civil service system provided one of the main avenues for social mobility in Chinese society, although, in practice, due to the time-consuming nature of the study, the examination was generally only taken by sons of the landed gentry. The examination tested each candidate's memorization of the Nine Classics of Confucianism, his ability to compose poetry using fixed and traditional forms, and his calligraphy. It was ideally suited to literary candidates. Thus, toward the end of the Ming Dynasty, the system attracted the candidature of Tang Xianzu (1550–1616). Tang at 14 passed the imperial examination at the county level; and at 21, he did so at the provincial level; but not until he was 34 did he pass at the national level. However, he had already become a well-known poet at age 12, and among other things he went on to such distinction as a profound literati and dramatist that it would not be far-fetched to regard him as China's answer to William Shakespeare.

The Chinese system was often admired by European commentators from the 16th century onward. However, the Chinese imperial examination system was hardly universally admired by all Europeans who knew of it. In a debate in the unelected chamber of the UK parliament on March 13, 1854, John Browne 'pointed out [clearly with some disdain] that the only precedent for appointing civil servants by literary exams was that of the Chinese government'. The examination system and the bureaucracy it engendered would remain in place in some form until the dissolution of the Qing dynasty in 1911.

=== People's Republic of China ===
The People's Republic of China did not initially maintain a formal civil service like other countries of the era. As the CCP gained ground in the Chinese Civil War against the Kuomintang (KMT), it instead used dedicated CCP cadres to oversee and administer territories it took over. The CCP, at the time of its victory in 1949, faced a serious shortage of qualified personnel to the fill over 2.7 million public positions needed to govern the country that had previously been occupied by KMT-affiliated officials, some of whom the CCP had to allow to continue to work due to lack of suitable replacements. By the mid-1950s, China had developed a nomenklatura system modeled on the Soviet Union; there was no civil service independent of the ruling party.
