= Czajka (surname) =

Czajka is a Polish surname. Notable people with the surname include:

- Eugeniusz Czajka (1927–2011), Polish field hockey player
- Jerzy Czajka (born 1942), Polish field hockey player
- Tomasz Czajka, Polish computer scientist
