= Chida (surname) =

Chida (written: 千田 lit. "thousand ricefield") is a Japanese surname. Notable people with the surname include:

- Kaito Chida (千田 海人, born 1994), Japanese footballer
- Kenta Chida (千田 健太, born 1985), Japanese fencer
- Michihito Chida (千田 美智仁, born 1958), Japanese rugby union player
- Shōta Chida (千田 翔太, born 1994), Japanese shogi player
- Tsutomu Chida (千田 務, born 1950), Japanese aikidoka

== Other people ==
- Farhat Chida (born 1982), Tunisian Paralympic athlete

== See also ==
- Chica (name)
- Chika (general name)
