= Chivas =

Chivas may refer to:

- Chivas Regal, a blended Scotch whisky produced by Chivas Brothers
- C.D. Guadalajara, commonly known as Chivas, a Mexican men's association football club based in Guadalajara, Jalisco
- C.D. Guadalajara (women), commonly known as Chivas, a women's Mexican association football club based in Guadalajara, Jalisco
- Chivas Tijuana, a Mexican association football club based in Tijuana, Baja California from 1997 to 1999
- Chivas USA (2005–2014), a former American soccer club from Los Angeles, California, founded and owned by the owner of C.D. Guadalajara
- El Paso Patriots or Chivas El Paso Patriots, an American soccer club based in El Paso, Texas
- Chivas Jazz Festival
- "Chivas", a song by Kelly Clarkson from My December
- Doug Chivas (1922–2004)

== See also ==
- Chiva (disambiguation)
