= Checa (disambiguation) =

Checa may refer to:

== Places ==
- Checa, Ecuador
- Checa, Spain

== People ==
- Carlos Checa, Spanish motorcycle racer
- David Checa, Carlos's younger brother, also a Spanish motorcycle racer
- Francisco Checa (born 1940), Panamanian basketball player
- Maria Checa, a Colombian-American model and actress
- Ulpiano Checa (1860–1916), Spanish artist

== Other ==
- Checa (Spanish Civil War), a slang term for the unofficial jails and torture chambers operated by leftists during the Spanish Civil War. The name comes from the Soviet secret police Cheka

== See also ==
- Chica (disambiguation)
