= Matthias Chika Mordi =

Nigerian banker

- Chika
- Born: 1967 (age 58–59); Lagos State, Nigeria
- Citizenship: Nigeria, United States of America
- Education: Economics, Business admin, Public Policy, Public Communications
- Alma mater: University of Ilorin, Harvard Business School, Harvard Kennedy School, IESE Business School, Johns Hopkins University - Paul H. Nitze School of Advanced International Studies, American University Washington D.C.
- Occupations: CEO of National Competitiveness Council of Nigeria & Chairman of United Capital formerly (UBA Capital)
- Years active: 2013- present & 2014- present
- Organization: National Competitiveness Council of Nigeria

Matthias Chika Mordi (born 1967) is a banker from Delta State, in Nigeria. An economist by training, he is the Chief Executive Officer of National Competitiveness Council of Nigeria and is the Chairman of United Capital PLC. He is an Honourable Senior member of the Chartered Institute of Bankers of Nigeria and former alternate president of the West African Institute of Bankers (2005-2008).

Mordi has an MBA and four Master's degrees in Public Sector Leadership and Policy, IESE Business School, Harvard Business School, Harvard Kennedy School of Gov't, Johns Hopkins University - Paul H. Nitze School of Advanced International Studies, and American Univ.BSc in Economics, University of Ilorin.

In 2016, Mordi was appointed to the advisory board of Harvard University's Shorenstein Center. Mordi served on the World Economic Forum's Global Agenda Board.

Mordi is a fiscal conservative and radical proponent of free markets, liberal democracy and is committed to reducing extreme poverty and transformative development in Africa.
