= Chika (name) =

Chika is a given name or a nickname. It can be an Igbo given name or Japanese given name. It may be neither. Non-Igbo and Non-Japanese people using the name, include the following:

== Given name ==
- Chika Emeagi (born 1979), Australian women's basketball player
- Sriranga Chika Raya or Sriranga II (died 1614), Indian monarch

== Nickname ==
- Chika (footballer), born Celso Cardoso de Moraes, (born 1979), Brazilian defender
- Sisca Chika Jessica (born 1988), Indonesian actress

== See also ==
- Chia (surname)
- Chaika (surname)
- Chiba (surname)
- Chica (name)
- Chicka (disambiguation)
- Chida (surname)
- Chika (disambiguation)
- Chika (Igbo given name)
- Chika (Japanese given name)
- Chiki
