= Chi (surname) =

Chi (池, pinyin: chí; Wade-Giles: Ch'ih^{2}) is a Chinese surname.

Chi is also the McCune–Reischauer romanization of the Korean surname Ji (지) as well as the Wade–Giles romanization of Pinyin Ji, the pronunciation of several common Chinese surnames.

== Notable people ==
- Chi Li, (池莉, born 1957) is a contemporary female Chinese writer based in Wuhan
- Chi In-jin (Korean: 지인진, Hanja: 池仁珍, born July 18, 1973, in Seoul) is a South Korean former boxer in the featherweight division
- Chi Zhongguo (Chinese: 池忠国; Korean: 지충국; RR: Ji Chung-guk) is a Chinese footballer of Korean descent
- Chi Wenyi (Chinese: 池文一; Korean: 지문일; born 18 February 1988 in Yanji, Yanbian) is a Chinese footballer of Korean descent
- Chi Zhiqiang (Chinese: 池志强; 16 November 1924 – 7 January 2020) was a Chinese pharmacologist and researcher at Shanghai Institute of Materia Medica
- Chi Biqing (Chinese: 池必卿) (1917–2007) was a People's Republic of China politician
- Chi Chunxue (Chinese: 池春雪; pinyin: Chí Chūnxuě; born 1998) is a Chinese cross-country skier
- Michael Chi or Chi Yufeng (Chinese: 池宇峰; pinyin: Chí Yǔ Fēng; born 1971) is a Chinese Internet entrepreneur, the founder and chairman of Perfect World Investment & Holding Group
- Chi Hyun-jung (池炫靜, Korean: 지현정; born December 6, 1971) is a South Korean former competitive figure skater
- Chi Minghua (Chinese: 池明华; born March 6, 1962) is a Chinese football coach and former international football player
- Yuejie Chi (池越洁), Chinese and American electrical and computer engineer
- Jing Chi, New Zealand professor of finance
- Maggie Chi, Canadian politician
- Zhenrui Chi, (池振睿, born 2009) is a Chinese racing driver

== See also ==
- Reiko Ike, (池 玲子, Ike Reiko, born May 25, 1953, in Tokyo, Japan) is a Japanese actress, singer, and entertainer, born Ikeda Reiko (池田玲子)
- Ikeda (surname) (written: 池田)
