= Chukwuemeka Chikelu =

Nigerian lawyer and politician

Minister of Information and National Orientation
- In office July 2003 – June 2005
- Succeeded by: Frank Nweke

Personal details
- Party: People's Democratic Party (PDP)

Chukwuemeka Chikelu // is a Nigerian lawyer and politician who was a National Representative from Anambra State (1999–2003), and then was Minister of Information and National Orientation during the second term of President Olusegun Obasanjo.

== Background ==
Chikelu earned a B.Sc. in Political Science and Public Administration from the University of Maiduguri and an LLB from the University of Buckingham in the United Kingdom before being called to the Nigerian Bar. He founded the Matterson Group, a real estate development company, in 1996. His father Chief Gilbert Chikelu, the Owelle Ichida, worked for Olusegun Obasanjo when he was military head of state.

== Political career ==
In 1999, Chikelu ran successfully on the People's Democratic Party (PDP) platform as a representative for the Anaocha/Njikoka/Dunukofia constituency of Anambra State, holding office until May 2003.

Obasanjo selected Chikelu as Minister of Information at the start of his second term in 2003, a position in which he was expected to act as government spokesman. In 2004, Chikelu announced an "image laundry" scheme to improve Nigeria's international image and make the country more attractive to foreign investors. The idea was greeted with some skepticism. In May 2004, he directed all Federal Government media chief executives to give reduced charges for HIV/AIDS messages, and urged all other media executives to increase coverage and education on the epidemic. He also challenged Nigerian journalists to sustain the campaign against Female Genital Mutilation, saying they "should make it a covenant to write at least a story on the evils of the practice."

Obasanjo dropped him from his cabinet in a major cabinet reshuffle in June 2005, replacing him with Frank Nweke.

In September 2008 he was named a member of the Anambra PDP Peace and Reconciliation Committee, aimed at resolving infighting between party factions in the state. In 2009, he was being seen as a potential candidate for Governor of Anambra State in the elections due on 6 February 2010, although he had failed to express interest in running for the position. Chikelu would be "clean" candidate, unblemished by the murky politics of Anambra State.
