= Chiaki Ito =

Chiaki Ito 伊藤 千晃
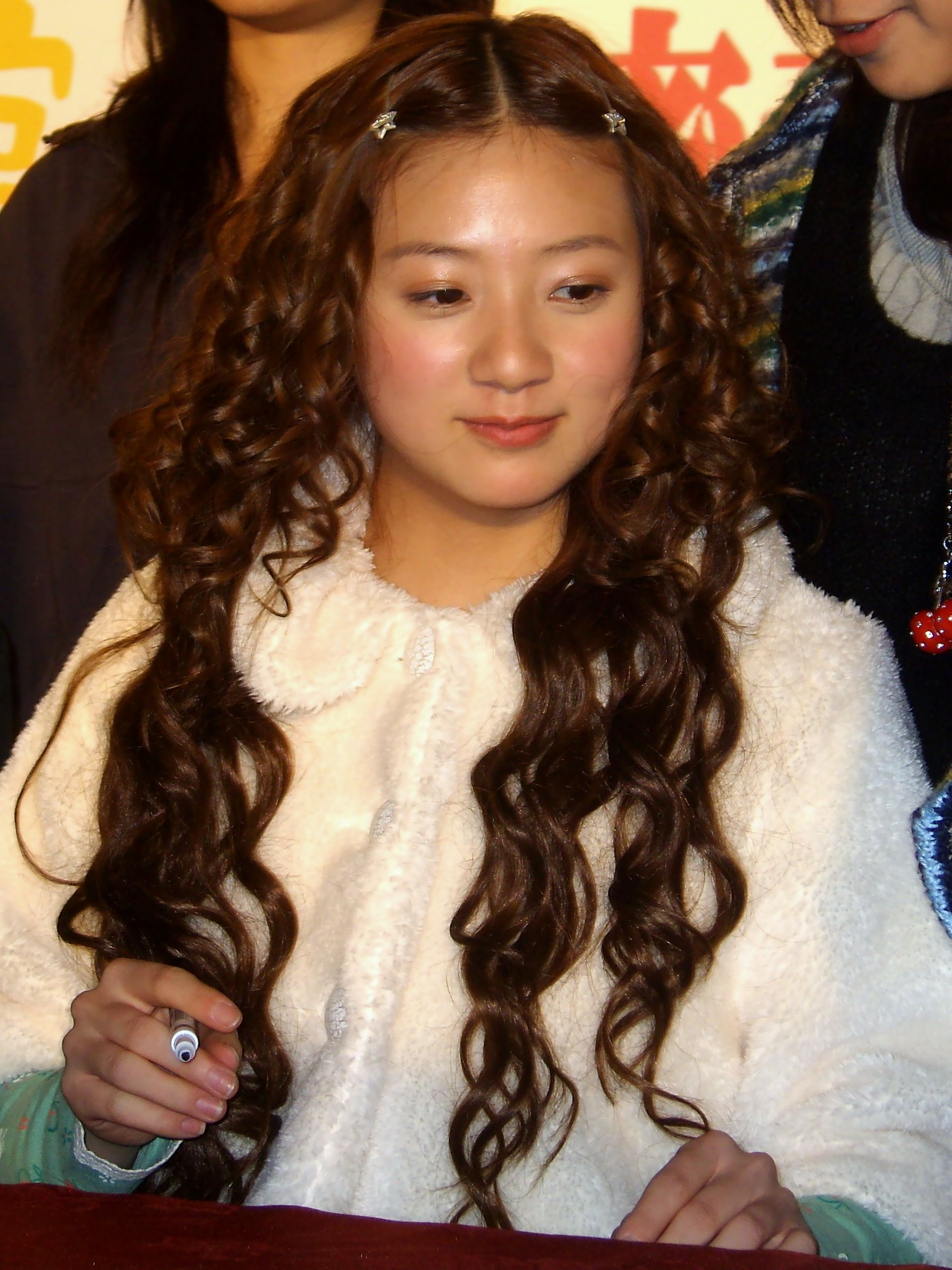

Background information
- Also known as: Chiaki
- Born: 10 January 1987 (age 39); Nagoya, Aichi Prefecture, Japan
- Genres: J-pop
- Occupations: Singer, actress, dancer, model
- Instrument: Singing
- Years active: 2005 -
- Label: Avex Trax
- Website: http://www.avexnet.or.jp/aaa/

Chiaki Ito (伊藤 千晃, Itō Chiaki; born January 10, 1987 in Nagoya, Aichi Prefecture, Japan) is a Japanese singer, actress, dancer, model and a former member of the group AAA.

== Filmography ==
=== Drama ===
Year	Title	Role	Notes	Ref.
2006	Karera no Umi VIII Sentimental Journey			
2008	Honey and Clover	Hua Ben Yu / Hagumi Hanamoto	She also sang the insert songs, "Give Me Love" and "Clover's Blessing"	
2008–09	Mirai Seiki Shakespeare			

=== Anime ===
Year	Title	Role	Notes	Ref.
2008	Sands of Destruction	Nadeshiko		

=== Information series ===
Year	Title	Notes
2006	D4	
2007	F2C	
2009	Venus Search	

=== Films ===
Year	Title	Role	Notes	Ref.
2007	Heat Island	Yoko		

=== Magazines ===
Year	Title	Notes
	Cheek	
	Popteen	
2008	Bijin ni Narimashou	Photo Booth

=== Internet distribution ===
Year	Title	Network	Notes
	Mobile Seventeen AAA Chiaki Ito no Rabukomyu	Mobage	
2012	Joshidjikara Cafe	Ameba Studio	

=== Events ===
Year	Title	Notes	Ref.
2007	19th Golden Melody Awards	Guest appearance with the cast of Honey and Clover as members of Clover Gakudan	
2009	Nippon Professional Baseball Hanshin vs. Chunichi	Nagoya Dome; First-pitch ceremony	
2012	FM Aichi Kōkai Rokuon: AAA Chiaki Ito Talk Show	Asunal Kanyama, Nagoya; also a handshake meeting	
2012	Dsquared Tokyo Opening Reception		
2012	Premium Cooking	Shibuya Parco, ABC Cooking Shibuya Parco Studio	
2013	Special Talk Live	ANA Crowne Plaza Hotel Grand Court Nagoya	
2013	Special Talk Live	Hotel New Otani Osaka	

=== PC software ===
Year	Title	Notes	Ref.
2014	Chika	Internet	

== Products ==
Year	Title	Notes	Ref.
2013	False eyelashes "CharmingKiss"	Don Quixote Nite; launch event carried out on July 23	
2014	2-week disposable color contact "2Week ViewM"		

== Music works ==
Year	Title	Notes
2014	"Charming Kiss"	By the name Chiaki (AAA) Chika

== Books ==
=== Photo books ===
Year	Title	Notes	Ref.
2011	Chiaki Ito Photobook: Chercher	Kodansha; on December 17, 2011, to commemorate her first photo book, a Kinokuniya launch handshake meeting at Shinjuku South Store Special Venue is performed which 1,500 fans gathered	
2012	Chiaki Ito Style Book: Chiaki Type A to Z	Takarajimasha	
2014	Chiaki Ito Photobook: Destruction		
