= Frank Nweke =

Nigerian politician

Frank Nweke Jr
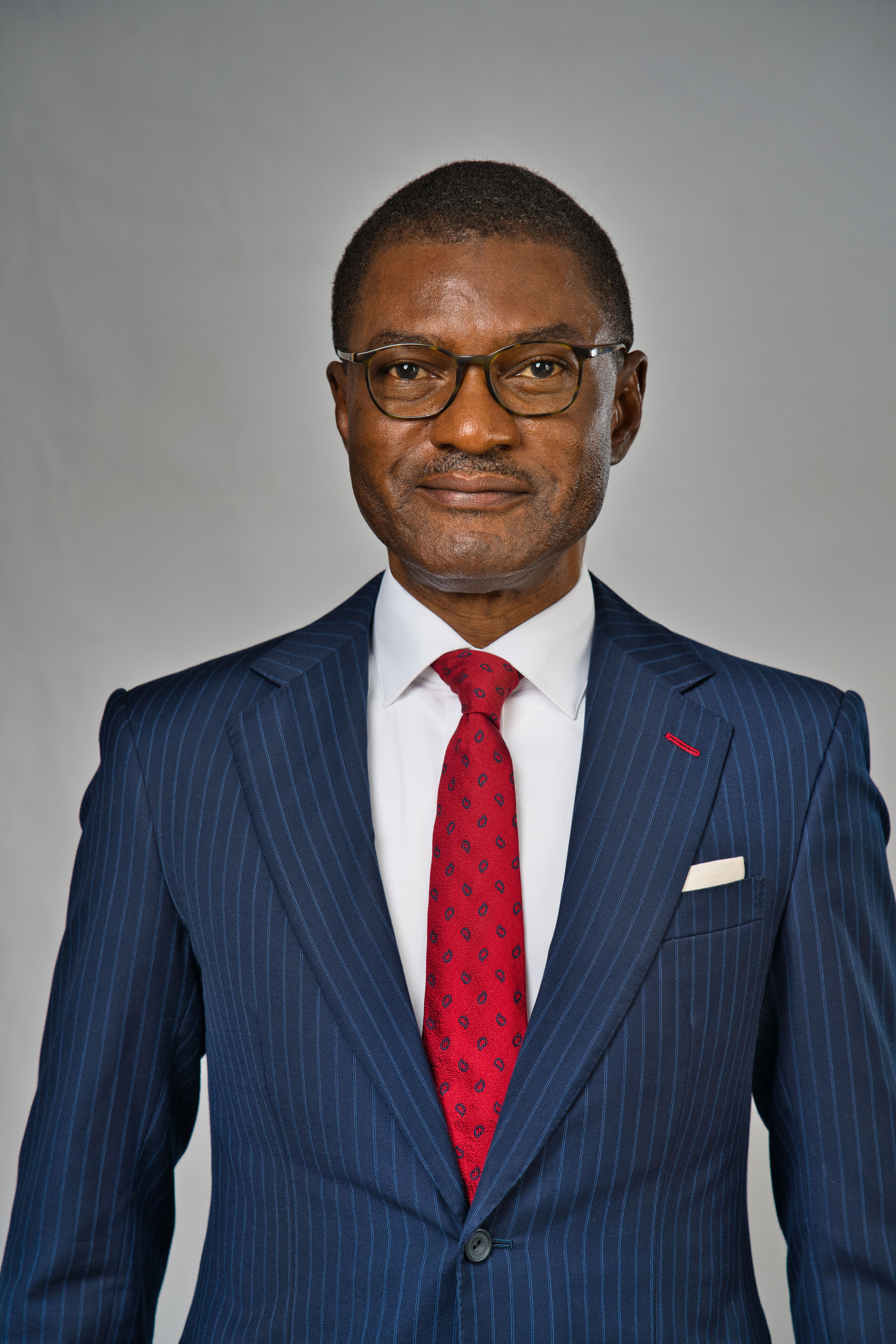

Minister for Intergovernmental Affairs, Special Duties and Youth Development
- In office April 2004 – June 2005

Minister of Information and National Orientation
- In office June 2005 – January 2007
- Preceded by: Chukwuemeka Chikelu

Minister of Information and Communications
- In office January 2007 – May 2007
- Preceded by: Obafemi Anibaba (Communications)
- Succeeded by: John Odey

Director General, Nigerian Economic Summit Group (NESG)
- In office 2009–2014
- Preceded by: Dr. Ahmed Mansur
- Succeeded by: Laiye Jaiyeola

Personal details
- Born: 18 September 1965 (age 60)
- Party: All Progressives Grand Alliance
- Education: J.F Kennedy School of Government; University of Maiduguri; Federal University of Technology, Yola
- Website: franknwekeii.com

Frank Nnaemeka Nweke Jr (born 18 September 1965) is a Nigerian Politician, Entrepreneur, Teacher and Social Innovator. He is a two-time Federal Minister in Nigeria and former Director General, Nigerian Economic Summit Group (NESG). He is currently a member of the All Progressives Grand Alliance (APGA) and vied for the position of Governor of Enugu in the 2023 Nigerian General Election, upon emerging the party candidate at the primary election in May 2022.

He is a Senior Visiting Fellow of the Lagos Business School and a member of the faculty, the School of Politics, Policy and Governance (SPPG), Nigeria, where he lectures on Ethics and Values. He is an Edward S. Mason Fellow and an alumnus of the Aspen Institute, Colorado.

Nweke speaks Igbo, Yoruba and Hausa, the three major Nigerian languages fluently.

== Early life ==
Frank Nweke II (FNJ) was born in Kano, Nigeria to the family of late Igwe Frank Nweke, Okeifufe Napkparu Ujo Nku I, of Ishi Ozalla, Nkanu West Local Government Area of Enugu State.

== Education ==
Frank's early years were spent in Lagos where he began his primary school education at St. Paul's Catholic school. Following his family's migration to Maiduguri, he completed his primary education at Shehu Garbai primary school, thereafter proceeding to Federal Government College, Maiduguri for his secondary school education. He went on to obtain a Bachelor of Technology Degree in Zoology from the Federal University of Technology, Yola. Thereafter, he earned a master's degree in Public Administration from the University of Maiduguri.

In 2007, FNJ attended the Harvard Kennedy School of Government where he obtained a second master's degree in Public Administration and a certificate in Strategic Management. He was elected President of the Harvard Kennedy School Alumni Association of Nigeria (2020 - 2022).

He is an Edward S. Mason Fellow and an alumnus of the Aspen Institute, Colorado.

== Early career ==
Nweke began his career as the General Manager of FONA Nigeria Limited, an office automation and industrial safety systems company with headquarters in Enugu.

== Public service ==
Enugu State

In 1999, Nweke was commissioned as a resident consultant to the Enugu State government on development planning and general public sector reforms. The following year, he was appointed Enugu State coordinator of the Community County Council.. In these positions, Nweke provided counsel on economic development, restructuring and privatization strategies for state-owned enterprises, and led the implementation of public-private investment projects in concert with development partners i.e. the UK Department for International Development, United States Agency for International Development, and the World Bank.

Chief of Staff to Enugu State Governor

From June 2001 to June 2003, Nweke held the position of Chief of Staff to Governor Chimaroke Nnamani, where he managed the office of the Governor and coordinated the overall government activities.

Obasanjo Cabinet

In June 2003, Nweke was appointed Federal Minister of Intergovernmental Affairs and Special Duties. He became Minister for Intergovernmental Affairs, Special Duties and Youth Development in April 2004. In July 2005, he was appointed Minister of Information and National Orientation and then, Minister of Information and Communication in January 2007, an office he occupied until May 2007.

During his tenure in Nigeria's Federal Executive Council as Minister of Special Affairs, Nweke coordinated and led the implementation of bold policy reforms in the information and telecommunications sector.

== Civic career ==
NESG

Nweke was appointed Director General of the Nigerian Economic Summit Group (NESG). Under his leadership, Nigeria successfully hosted its first World Economic Forum for Africa.

NzukoLabs

In 2018, Nweke co-founded NzukoLabs.

He is the chairman of the advisory board for Malaria, Child, Maternal Mortality Eradication, MACMME, Nigeria.

Until recently, he was a Senior Visiting Fellow of the Lagos Business School and a member of faculty, School of Politics, Policy and Governance (SPPG), Nigeria, where he lectured on Ethics and Values.

== Entrepreneurship ==
Nweke is an entrepreneur and investor with interests in media, construction and technology-based ventures.

Upon return from Harvard in 2008, He established Stellar Constellation Group, a diversified holding company with interests in Technology Solutions, Fintech, Media, Real estate and Construction and Trading. In 2012, he co-founded ONTV and currently sits as the chairman.

In 2011, he co-led the establishment of a methanol and gas processing plant in Nigeria - Brass Petrochemical and Fertilizer Company Ltd. Nigeria, with the capacity to provide 15,000 jobs upon commencement of construction in the fourth quarter of 2022.

== Board roles and committees ==
- Board member, Nigerian Breweries Plc. (2011 – 2014)
- Board member, Brass Fertilizer (2011–2022)
- Board member, Callphone Nigeria Limited (2020 – Present)
- Chairman, Communications sub-committee, Presidential Committee on Flood Relief and Rehabilitation
- Trustee, Rise Networks Human and Education Development
- Trustee, Mothers United and Mobilized
- Chief Executive Officer, WEF Africa 2014 Secretariat
- Member, Next Generation Nigeria Task Force
- Member, Private Sector Working Group (PSWG)
- Member, National Competitiveness Council of Nigeria (NCCN)
- Member, World Economic Forum (WEF) Africa 2014 Steering Committee
- Member, WEF Global Agenda Council on Africa (2014 – 2016)
- Member, Presidential Committee on Flood Relief and Rehabilitation
- Member, World Bank Consultative Group
- Member, National Steering Committee on the Growth and Employment (GEM) Project
- Consultant to the DFID, Program Support Group (PSG)

== Memberships and affiliations ==
Frank Nweke is a member of:

- Nigerian Institute of Management
- Nigerian Red Cross Society

== Political aspiration ==
Nweke ran for Enugu East senatorial district seat in 2015 under the umbrella of the People's Democratic Party (PDP). He later defected from the People's Democratic Party to the All Progressives Grand Alliance (APGA). In April 2022, he announced his intention to run for the APGA nomination for Governor of Enugu in the 2023 gubernatorial election. He emerged as the party's flagbearer and came third in the elections behind the Labour Party Candidate Chijioke Edeoga and the declared winner Peter Mbah of the People's Democratic Party. He challenged the results at the tribunal but eventually, withdrew his petition on Sunday, July 16, 2023.
