= Chilca (disambiguation) =

Chilca may refer to:

== Places in Peru ==
- Chilca District, Huancayo, Peru, a district in the province of Huancayo.
- Chilca District, Cañete, Peru, a district in the province of Cañete.
- Chilca, Cañete, Peru, a city in the province of Cañete.

== Science and Technology ==
- Chilca Launch Range, a rocket launch test site in the Peruvian province of Cañete.

== See also ==
- Chica (disambiguation)
