= Chii =

Chii may refer to:

- Chii Tomiya (born 1991), Japanese professional wrestler
- Takeo Chii (born 1942–2012), Japanese actor
- Chi (Chobits), a fictional character in the manga series Chobits

== See also ==
- Chi (disambiguation)
- Chiki
