= Chikai =

Chikai may refer to:

- "Chikai" (Eiko Shimamiya song), 2009
- "Chikai" (Do As Infinity song), 2011
- "Chikai" (Hikaru Utada song), 2018
- "Chikai" or "The Oath", a volume of manga series One Piece, 1998

== See also ==
- Chiki
