= Chipper (nickname) =

Chipper is a nickname for:

- Damien Adkins (born 1981), Australian rules footballer
- Waverly Brown (1935–1981), New York police officer killed during an infamous 1981 armed robbery of a Brinks Armored Car
- Chipper Harris (1962–2018), American basketball player
- Chipper Jones (born 1972), American Major League baseball player
- Chipper Lowell, American comedian

== See also ==
- Chip (nickname)
- Chips (nickname)
