= Chini (disambiguation) =

Chini is a village in Sadat Rural District, in the Central District of Lali County, Khuzestan Province, Iran.

Chini may also refer to:

- Chini (film), a 2016 Indian film
- Chini (letter), a letter in three Georgian scripts
- Chini (reservoir), Melfa, Ethiopia
- Chini (state constituency), Pahang, Malaysia
- Chini Lake, Pekan District, Pahang, Malaysia
- Chini language or Akrukay, Papua New Guinea
- Chini Mosque, in Saidpur, Bangladesh

== See also ==
- Chiki
- Cini (disambiguation)
