= Chiba =

Chiba may refer to:

== Places ==
=== China ===
- Chiba, Hubei (尺八镇), town in Jianli County, Jingzhou, Hubei

=== Japan ===
- Chiba (city), capital of Chiba Prefecture
  - Chiba Station, a train station
- Chiba Prefecture, a sub-national jurisdiction in the Greater Tokyo Area on the eastern coast of Honshū
- Port of Chiba, Chiba Prefecture

== People ==
- Chiba (musician), American rapper
- Chiba (surname)

== Other uses ==
- Chiba (instrument), a Chinese woodwind
- Chiba, slang for cannabis

== See also ==
- Chica (disambiguation)
- Chika (disambiguation)
- Chib (disambiguation)
- Chiva
