= Chips (nickname) =

Chips is a nickname which may refer to:

- Henry Channon (1897–1958), British MP and diarist
- Chips Hardy (born 1950), English screenwriter, novelist, playwright, and creative director
- Chips Keswick (born 1940), British businessman
- Chips Kiesbye, guitarist for the Swedish band Sator
- Chips Mackinolty (born 1954), involved in the campaigns against the war in Vietnam by producing posters
- Chips Moman (1937–2016), American record producer, guitarist and songwriter
- Chips Sobek (1920–1990), American National Basketball Association player

== See also ==
- Chip (nickname)
- Chipper (nickname)
- Chippy (nickname)
