= Chiva =

Chiva or CHIVA may refer to:

- Chiva, Armenia, a village in Armenia
- Chiva, Spain, a municipality in Spain
- Chiva (charity), the Children's HIV Association, UK and Ireland
- Chiva bus, a decorated Colombian rural bus
- CHIVA method, a type of surgery used to treat varicose veins
- Chiva River, a tributary of the Șipoaia River in Romania

== See also ==
- Chiba
- Chivas (disambiguation)
