= Chica =

Chica may refer to:

- Chica (name), a given name, surname and nickname

== Other uses ==
- Chica (dye), an orange-red dye
- Chicá, Panama, a subdistrict
- Fridericia chica, also called chica, a plant
- the title character of The Chica Show, an American animated television series
- Chica the Chicken, an animatronic character from Five Nights at Freddy's

== See also ==
- Boca Chica (disambiguation)
- Chika (disambiguation)
- Nhá Chica, "Aunt Francie" in Portuguese, nickname of Francisca de Paula de Jesus (1810–1895), first Afro-Brazilian Roman Catholic to be beatified
- Olga de Chica (1921–2016), Colombian neo-primitivist painter
- Checa (disambiguation)
- Chia (disambiguation)
- Chiba (disambiguation)
- Chic (disambiguation)
- Chick (disambiguation)
- Chico (disambiguation)
- Chilca (disambiguation)
- China (disambiguation)
- Chita (disambiguation)
