= Tomigusuku Chōshun =

Ryukyuan royal

- 豊見城 朝春

sessei of Ryukyu
- In office 1831–1832
- Preceded by: Haneji Chōbi
- Succeeded by: Urasoe Chōki

Personal details
- Born: Unknown Shuri, Ryukyu Kingdom
- Died: September 23, 1832 Kagoshima, Satsuma Domain, Japan
- Parent: Tomigusuku Chōkō (father)
- Chinese name: Shō Kai (尚 楷)
- Rank: Wōji

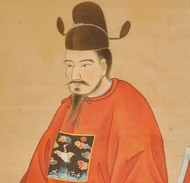
Portrait of Prince Tomigusuku by Toda Ujitsune on 17 December 1832 (Japanese calendar: 16 November, Tenpō 3) in Edo, Japan. In fact this man is the Futenma Chōten, a political decoy of Prince Tomigusuku. Prince Tomigusuku died on 23 September 1832 (Chinese calendar: 29 August, Daoguang 12) in Kagoshima.

Tomigusuku Wōji Chōshun (豊見城 王子 朝春; ? – 23 September 1832), also known by his Chinese style name Shō Kai (尚 楷), was a royal of Ryukyu Kingdom.

Tomigusuku Chōshun was the seventh head of a royal family called Tomigusuku Udun (豊見城御殿). He was the eldest son of Tomigusuku Chōkō (豊見城 朝興). His rank was Aji at first. In 1831, he was appointed as sessei, and elevated to the rank Wōji, which was the highest rank among royals.

King Shō Iku dispatched a gratitude envoy for his taking power to Edo, Japan in 1832. He and Takushi Ando (沢岻 安度, also known by Mō Ishin 毛 惟新) was appointed as Envoy (正使, seishi) and Deputy Envoy (副使, fukushi) respectively. However, he died in Kagoshima on 23 September 1832 (by the Japanese calendar, the 29th day, 8th month, of the year Tenpō-3). Futenma Chōten (普天間 朝典, also known by Shō Kan 向 寛) served as the political decoy of him, took his title "Prince Tomigusuku" and went to Edo. He buried in Kagoshima.

Prince Tomigusuku was father-in-law of King Shō Iku. He was also grandfather of King Shō Tai.

Tomigusuku Chōshun
Preceded by Tomigusuku Chōkō	Head of Tomigusuku Udun	Succeeded by Tomigusuku Chōson
Political offices
Preceded by Haneji Chōbi	Sessei of Ryukyu; 1831 - 1832	Succeeded by Urasoe Chōki
