= ORP Czajka =

ORP Czajka is the name of the following ships of the Polish Navy:

- ORP Czajka (1918), a FM-class minesweeper
- ORP Czajka (1935), a Jaskółka-class minesweeper
- ORP Czajka (1966), a Orlik-class minesweeper in commission 1967–2021
- ORP Czajka (606), a Kormoran 2-class minehunter launched in 2025

== See also ==
- Czajka (disambiguation)
