= Chixi, Cangnan County =

Chixi 赤溪镇
- Town
- Location in Zhejiang
- Coordinates: 27°20′21″N 120°30′31″E
- Country: China
- Province: Zhejiang
- Prefecture-level city: Wenzhou
- County: Cangnan County

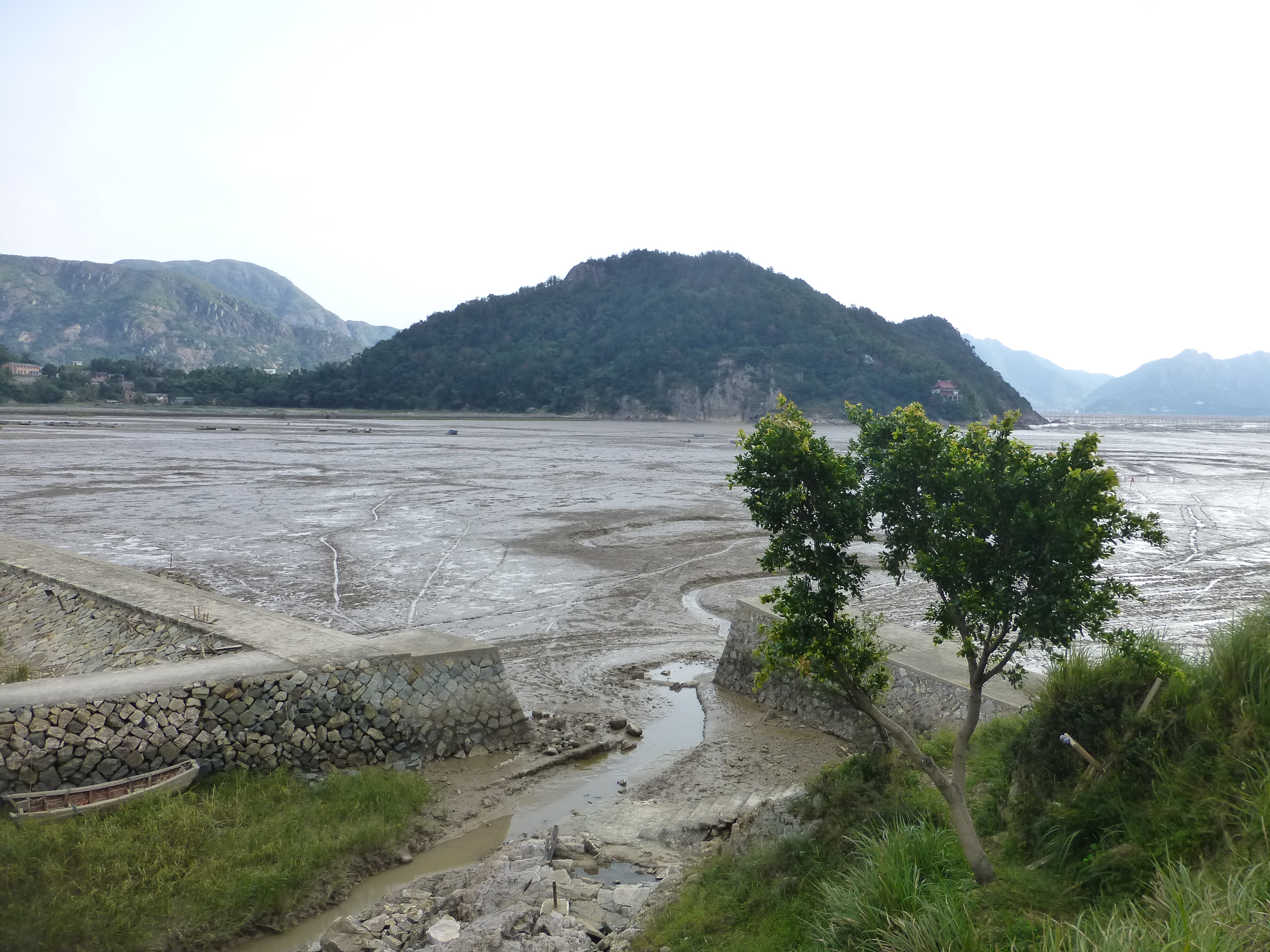
Dayu Bay

Chixi (Chinese: 赤溪; pinyin: Chìxī) is a town under the jurisdiction of Cangnan County, Wenzhou City, Zhejiang Province, People's Republic of China.

== Administrative divisions ==
Chixi Town administers the following village-level administrative division units:

Chixi, Nanxing Village (南行村), Banyang Village (半垟村), Si'an Village (泗安村), Baiwan Village (白湾村), Liuqi'ao Village (流岐岙村), Yuanyuan Village (园林村), Xinzhi Village (信智村), Hujing Village (湖井村), Yuanyu Village (园屿村), Shuanglian Village (双联村), Zhongdun Community (中墩社区), Wangjiashan Village (王家山村), Nantou Village (南头村), Shapo Village (沙坡村), Diaobideng Village (吊壁灯村), Shitang Village (石塘村), Anfeng Village (安峰村), Yuxi Village (玉溪村), Wudongqiao Village (五洞桥村), Xindong Village (新东村), and Xiamen Village (下门村).

== Chixi Wudong Bridge ==
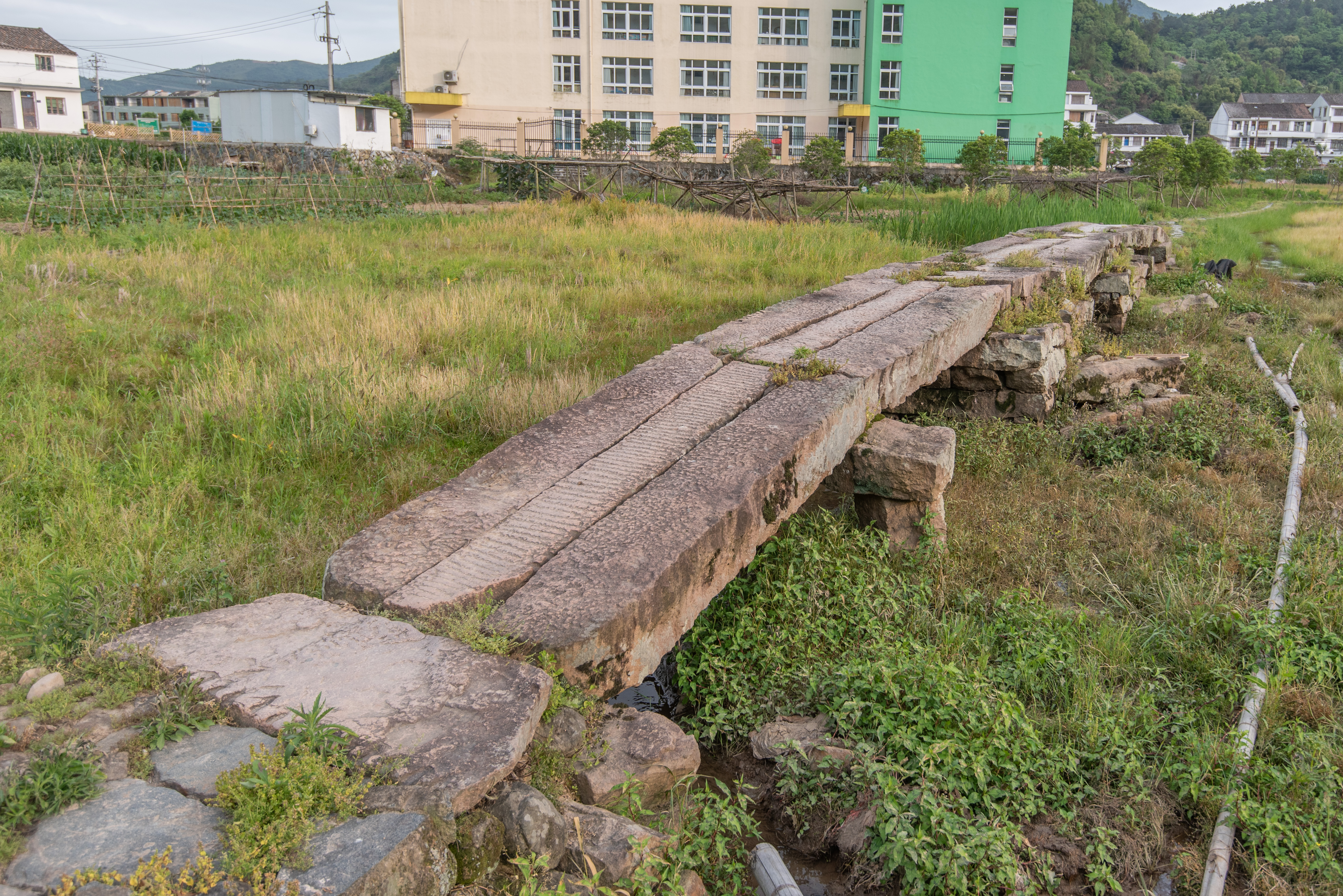
Chixi Wudong Bridge.

The Chixi Wudong Bridge was included in the sixth batch of national-level key cultural relics protection units on May 25, 2006. The date of the construction of the bridge is unknown, but it was rebuilt in the third year of Xianchun in the Southern Song Dynasty (1267). It is a five-hole beam stone bridge with a north–south direction, 24.6 meters long and 1.7 meters wide.
