= Chikan, Iran =

Chikan چيكان
- Village
- Location within Iran
- Coordinates: 30°29′15″N 51°58′56″E
- Country: Iran
- Province: Fars
- County: Sepidan
- Bakhsh: Central
- Rural District: Komehr

Population (2006)
  - Total: 60
- Time zone: UTC+3:30 (IRST)
  - Summer (DST): UTC+4:30 (IRDT)

Chikan (Persian: چيكان, also Romanized as Chīkān) is a village in Komehr Rural District, in the Central District of Sepidan County, Fars province, Iran. At the 2006 census, its population was 60, in 20 families.
