= Chika (Japanese given name) =

- Pronunciation: CHEE-kah
- Gender: Female

Origin
- Origin: Japanese
- Meaning: Depending on the kanji used, it have many different meanings
- Region of origin: Japan

Chika (ちか, チカ) is a feminine Japanese given name. The name Chika can be written with the kanji characters 千 (chi) meaning "thousand", 智 (chi) meaning "wisdom, intellect" or 散 (chi) meaning "scatter" combined with 佳 (ka) meaning "good, fine" or 花 (ka) meaning "flower". Chika can also be written with many different kanji characters thus, giving the name various meanings.

== Written forms in Japanese ==
Chika can be written using different kanji characters and can mean:

- 千佳, "thousand, excellence"
- 千夏, "thousand, summer"
- 千賀, "thousand, celebration"
- 千香, "thousand, fragrance"
- 千花, "thousand, flower"
- 千華, "thousand, chinese flower"
- 千果, "thousand, fruit"
- 知香, "knowledge, fragrance"
- 知佳, "knowledge, excellence"
- 智香, "wisdom, fragrance"
- 愛, "love" (nanori reading)

The name can also be written in hiragana or katakana.

== People ==
- Chika, a member of the Japanese girl group D&D
- Chika Anzai (安済 知佳; born 1990), Japanese voice actress
- Chika Aoki (青木 千佳; born 1990), Japanese fencer
- Chika Goto (後藤 智香; born 1994), Japanese professional wrestler and gravure idol
- Chika Hirao (平尾 知佳; born 1996), Japanese women's footballer
- Chika Ishimaru (石丸 千賀; born 1996), Japanese former member of the Super Girls (Japanese group)
- Chika Kodama (児玉 千佳; born 1970), Japanese softball player
- Chika Kuroda (黒田 チカ; 1884–1968), Japanese chemist
- Chika Nanase (七瀬 千花; born 2004), Japanese professional wrestler
- Chika Otaki (大滝 知香; born 1998), Japanese ice hockey player
- Chika Sagawa (左川 ちか; 1911–1936), Japanese avant-garde poet
- Chika Sakamoto (千夏; born 1959), Japanese voice actress
- Chica Umino (羽海野 チカ), Japanese manga artist
- Chika Yoshida (吉田 知加; born 1979), Japanese singer and songwriter
- Chika Yoshida (吉田 ちか; born 1984), Japanese YouTuber known as Bilingirl
- Exo-Chika, founding member of Aural Vampire (オーラルヴァンパイア), Japanese group
- Chika, percussionist for Japanese heavy metal music ensemble Hanabie.

== Fictional characters ==
- Chika Akatsuki (知佳), a character in the manga series Zombie-Loan
- Chika Fujiwara (千花), a character in the manga and anime series Kaguya-sama: Love Is War
- Chika Ito (千佳), a character in the manga and anime series Strawberry Marshmallow
- Chika Komari (知花), a character in the light novel series Too Many Losing Heroines!
- Chika Midarezaki (千花), a character in the Japanese light novel series Kyōran Kazoku Nikki
- Chika Minazuki (ちか), a character in the manga and anime series Ai Yori Aoshi
- Chika Misumi (千歌), a character in the mobile gacha game Princess Connect Re:Dive
- Chika Ogiue (千佳), a character in the manga and anime series Genshiken
- Chika Takami (千歌), a character in the Japanese multimedia project Love Live! Sunshine!!
- Chika Yurikasa (千佳), a character in the manga and anime series Shrine of the Morning Mist
- Chika Yamada (千夏), a character in the manga and anime series B Gata H Kei
- Chika Kudou (久遠愛), a character in the manga and anime series Kono Oto Tomare! Sounds of Life
- Chika, a character in the manga series Monkey High!
- Chika Daimon, a character in the anime series Digimon Savers

== See also ==
- Chica (name)
- Chika (general name)
- Chika (Igbo given name)
- Chika (disambiguation)
- Chiki
- Chicka (disambiguation)
