= Chika Stacy Oriuwa =

Canadian physician, spoken word artist, and advocate against systemic racism

- Born: Ontario, Canada
- Education: McMaster University; University of Toronto Faculty of Medicine
- Occupations: Physician, Poet, Advocate
- Employer: University of Toronto
- Known for: Advocacy against systemic racism in health care
- Awards: Barbie Role Model Program honoree (2021)

Chika Stacy Oriuwa is a Canadian physician, spoken word artist, and advocate against systemic racism in health care. In 2021, she was one of six frontline workers honored by the Barbie Role Model Program with a doll created in her likeness. In 2020, Oriuwa was the first black woman to become the sole valedictorian at the University of Toronto Faculty of Medicine.

== Early life and education ==
Oriuwa was born in Ontario, Canada. She is the daughter of Stephen and Catherine Oriuwa, who emigrated from Nigeria to Canada in the 1980s. She attended St Thomas Aquinas Secondary School in Brampton, Ontario, where she became valedictorian in 2011.

Oriuwa graduated from McMaster University with a bachelor's degree in Health Sciences and then took a gap year to focus on poetry. She was signed to the Hamilton Youth Poets slam poetry label and twice competed in national competitions. In 2016, Oriuwa began a combined medical degree and Master of Science at the University of Toronto Faculty of Medicine, where she was the only Black student in her class.

On 2 June 2020, Oriuwa graduated from the University of Toronto as valedictorian. She was the first solo black female valedictorian at University of Toronto, the second overall black female valedictorian, and the first woman in 14 years. Her valedictory address was presented online due to the COVID-19 pandemic.

== Advocacy ==
In 2017, the University of Toronto created the Black Student Application Program (BSAP), an optional application process that requires the same standards and includes an interview process conducted by members of the Black community, faculty, and students, and Oriuwa became an ambassador and public face of the program. As of 2020, the incoming class of 2024 has 24 black students.

During medical school, Oriuwa co-founded the Black Interprofessional Students' Association (BIPSA) to network students across graduate programs. She also served as a strategic advisor and contributing writer to Healthy Debate, a healthcare journalism platform.

In 2018, she delivered the keynote speech at Women's College Hospital for International Women's Day, titled "Thriving at the Intersections: Being a Black Woman in Medicine," and was a speaker at the 2018 International Women and Children's Health Conference at McMaster University. In 2019, she was a workshop speaker at the Canadian Conference on Physician Leadership. She has said she uses poetry both as an outlet for her struggles with encountering racism and as a form of advocacy against it and during her second year of medical school, created a spoken word video titled, "Woman, Black."

== Career ==
Oriuwa is a psychiatry resident at the University of Toronto.

Oriuwa is also the co-director of a non-profit youth leadership organization called Uflow, and was on the External Implementation Steering Committee to the Minister of Children and Youth Services, focused on shaping the Ontario Black Youth Action Plan.

== Awards and honors ==
- 2018 African Scholars Emerging Academic Award - University of Toronto
- 2020 Valedictorian of the University of Toronto Faculty of Medicine
- 2021 Barbie Role Model Program honoree
