= Chika (software) =

Vocaloid synthesizer software

- Developer: Internet Co., Ltd.
- Release: October 16, 2014
- Operating system: Windows
- Platform: PC
- Available in: Japanese
- Type: Vocal Synthesizer Application
- License: Proprietary
- Website: Homepage

Chika, is a Japanese female vocal for Vocaloid 3. Her vocal is sampled from Chiaki Ito, Japanese model and member of the Japanese pop band AAA.

== Development ==
The vocal itself contains twice the number of phonetic recordings as conventional vocals, resulting in a more natural sounding vocal. This was later confirmed to be caused by the addition of approx 200 triphonemic sounds. Noboru confirmed that she has the most triphones out of their Japanese vocals. She can cover rock songs due to her solid and stable bass.
