= Chip Flaherty =

American film producer

- Born: Arlington, Massachusetts
- Education: College of the Holy Cross (BA); Suffolk University (JD)
- Occupations: Film producer, publisher
- Notable work: The Chronicles of Narnia, Charlotte's Web, Journey to the Center of the Earth

Francis X. "Chip" Flaherty, Jr. is an American film producer, publisher and executive at SkyPath Media, a multimedia company producing The Lesson, a lifestyle brand of video programming.

== Early life and education ==
Flaherty grew up in Arlington, Massachusetts. He graduated from the College of the Holy Cross with a B.A. and earned his Juris Doctor from the Suffolk University Law School.

== Career ==
Before working at Walden Media, Flaherty was a Massachusetts assistant district attorney and then an assistant attorney general.

In 2000, Flaherty co-founded Walden Media, a film investor, distributor, and publishing company known for producing films based on children's literature, biographies or historical events. Walden Media’s films include The Chronicles of Narnia, Charlotte’s Web and the Journey to the Center of the Earth. Walden Media has produced more than 30 films that have grossed more than $3.5 billion in worldwide box office,

While at Walden Media, Flaherty also oversaw the company's entrance to the book publishing industry, serving as publisher. In 2004, he began a co-publishing venture with Penguin Young Readers Group and in 2008 he founded the imprint Walden Pond Press as a joint venture with HarperCollins.

In the course of marketing films and books, Flaherty has developed promotional initiatives, such as the "Break the World Reading Record with Charlotte's Web" event, launched in conjunction with the theatrical release of Charlotte’s Web. On Wednesday, December 13, 2006, 547,826 readers in 2,451 locations, 50 states and 28 countries read an excerpt from Charlotte's Web, breaking the previous world reading record set in the United Kingdom in 2004. Flaherty also implemented the “Ticket to a Better World” partnership with Read Across America during the theatrical release of The Giver, where 50 cents of every ticket purchased for the film was given to the Read Across America literacy program.

Flaherty’s executive producer credits include Fatima, starring Harvey Keitel and Sonia Braga; Mother’s Day (2016), starring Julia Roberts and Jennifer Aniston; The Great Gilly Hopkins (2015), starring Octavia Spencer and Kathy Bates; and the animated film The Little Prince (2015), starring Jeff Bridges, Mackenzie Foy, and Rachel McAdams.

In 2017 Flaherty was hired as president of Londonderry Films and exec VP of Londonderry LLC.
