= Reginald Cini =

Maltese footballer

Reggie Cini
Personal information
- Full name: Reginald Cini
- Date of birth: 22 October 1970 (age 56)
- Place of birth: Valletta, Malta
- Position: Goalkeeper

Youth career
- Valletta

Senior career*
Years	Team	Apps	(Gls)
1988–2001	Valletta	187	(1)
2001–2002	Sliema Wanderers	5	(0)
2002–2003	Marsaxlokk	14	(0)

International career^{‡}
- Malta U18
- Malta U21
1989–1997	Malta	26	(0)
- * Club domestic league appearances and goals as of 18 February 2008 ‡ National team caps and goals as of 18 February 2008

Reggie Cini (born 22 October 1970 in Malta) is a former professional footballer who played for Valletta, Sliema Wanderers and Marsaxlokk as a goalkeeper. He also kept goal for the Malta national football team.

== Honours ==
=== Valletta ===
Winner

- 1989/90, 1991/92, 1996/97, 1997/98, 1998/99, 2000/01 Maltese Premier League

Winner

- 1991, 1995, 1996, 1997, 1999, 2001 Maltese Cup
