= Chip Beall =

American television host

Charles "Chip" Beall (born March 17, 1954) is an American television host. Beall has hosted several student quiz shows including Texaco Star National Academic Championship, which was broadcast on the Discovery Channel, and Whiz Quiz. He is the president of Questions Unlimited, a company that writes questions for quiz bowl competitions. Their flagship event is the National Academic Championship.
