= Takahito Chiba =

Japanese footballer

Takahito Chiba 千葉 貴仁
Personal information
- Full name: Takahito Chiba
- Date of birth: November 7, 1984 (age 41)
- Place of birth: Monbetsu, Hokkaido, Japan
- Height: 1.80 m (5 ft 11 in)
- Position: Defender

Youth career
- 2000–2002: Aomori Yamada High School

Senior career*
Years	Team	Apps	(Gls)
2003–2008	Cerezo Osaka	36	(1)
2006	→Consadole Sapporo (loan)	18	(0)
2010–2011	ReinMeer Aomori		
Total		54	(1)
Medal record
Cerezo Osaka
Runner-up	Emperor's Cup	2003
- * Club domestic league appearances and goals

Takahito Chiba (千葉 貴仁, Chiba Takahito; born November 7, 1984) is a former Japanese football player.

== Club statistics ==
Club performance			League		Cup		League Cup		Total	
Season	Club	League	Apps	Goals	Apps	Goals	Apps	Goals	Apps	Goals
Japan			League		Emperor's Cup		J.League Cup		Total	
2003	Cerezo Osaka	J1 League	0	0	0	0	0	0	0	0
2004	Cerezo Osaka	J1 League	26	1	1	0	2	0	29	1
2005	Cerezo Osaka	J1 League	0	0	0	0	0	0	0	0
2006	Consadole Sapporo	J2 League	18	0	0	0	-		18	0
2007	Cerezo Osaka	J2 League	10	0	0	0	-		10	0
2008	Cerezo Osaka	J2 League	0	0	0	0	-		0	0
Total			54	1	1	0	2	0	57	1
