= Chip Hines =

George "Chip" Hines (born 1968) is a Roman Catholic priest who co-hosted the CatholicTV program SearchLight, a movie review program that provides a Catholic view on popular entertainment.

Hines grew up in Reading, Massachusetts, and was ordained in 2004 by Cardinal Sean O'Malley. He became the pastor of St. Joseph Roman Catholic church in Medford, Massachusetts, in July 2012.

Hines is a guest on several StarQuest Production Network podcasts, including the Fathers Show, Let's Talk, and Secrets of Movies and TV Show.
