= Jing Chi =

New Zealand professor of finance

Academic background
- Education: University of Reading, Nanjing University
- Thesis: The performance and characteristics of the Chinese IPO market (20023)

Jing Chi is a New Zealand finance academic, and is a full professor at Massey University, specialising in Initial Public Offerings, Chinese corporate finance and Chinese corporate governance. She is a Chartered Financial Analyst and won a national award for her teaching.

== Academic career ==
Chi has worked in China for Huatai Securities, in the Investment Banking Department, where she was responsible for Initial Public Offerings, and at the London Stock Exchange as an analyst. Chi completed a PhD in finance titled The performance and characteristics of the Chinese IPO market at the University of Reading in 2003. Chi then joined the faculty of the School of Economics and Finance at Massey University in 2004, rising to full professor in 2024. Chi is Massey's first Chartered Financial Analyst.

Chi's research focuses on Initial Public Offerings, Chinese corporate governance and Chinese finance. Chi is an affiliate member of Massey's Sustainable Finance Cluster, and a Research Fellow in the China Research Centre at Victoria University of Wellington.

Chi was awarded the Massey Business School Star Award for Excellence in Student Support, Excellence in Enterprise and High-Performance Team. Chi won the Ako Aotearoa 2013 award for Sustained Excellence in Tertiary Teaching, with the citation describing her as "dedicated to communicating a complex discipline across cultural and geographical boundaries". Chi chairs a 'supervisor mentoring circle' and mentors other supervisors. Chi developed a Bachelor of Business Finance with a pathway to Chartered Financial Analyst, and has also led Massey's international joint programme with Wuhan, where students complete two years in Wuhan before finishing with two years at Massey. Chi is on the editorial board of the journal Finance Research Letters.

== Selected works ==
- Jing Chi; Carol Padgett (2005). "Short-run underpricing and its characteristics in Chinese initial public offering (IPO) markets". Research in International Business and Finance. 19 (1): 71–93. doi:10.1016/j.ribaf.2004.10.004. Wikidata Q127077608.
- Jing Chi; Qian Sun; Young, Martin (2011). "Performance and characteristics of acquiring firms in the Chinese stock markets". Emerging Markets Review. 12 (2): 152–170. doi:10.1016/j.ememar.2010.12.003. Wikidata Q127075656.
- Jingjing Yang; Jing Chi; Young, Martin (2011). "A review of corporate governance in China". Asian-Pacific Economic Literature. 25 (1): 15–28. doi:10.1111/j.1467-8411.2011.01283.x. Wikidata Q127075432.
- Eddy Chang; Chao Chen; Jing Chi; Young, Martin (2008). "IPO underpricing in China: New evidence from the primary and secondary markets". Emerging Markets Review. 9 (1): 1–16. doi:10.1016/j.ememar.2007.06.002. Wikidata Q127070682.
- Jing Chi; Carol Padgett (2005). "The performance and long-run characteristics of the Chinese IPO market". Pacific Economic Review. 10 (4): 451–469. doi:10.1111/j.1468-0106.2005.00285.x. Wikidata Q127070680.
- Jing Chi; Jing Liao; Xiaojun Chen (2016). "Politically connected CEOs and earnings management: evidence from China". Journal of the Asia Pacific Economy. 21 (3): 397–417. doi:10.1080/13547860.2016.1176644. Wikidata Q127070678.
- Jing Chi; Matthew McWha; Young, Martin (2010). "The performance and the survivorship of New Zealand IPOs". International Review of Financial Analysis. 19 (3): 172–180. doi:10.1016/j.irfa.2010.02.006. Wikidata Q127075648.
