= Chik Patrick Yue =

Chik Patrick Yue from the Hong Kong University of Science and Technology, Clear Water Bay, Hong Kong was named Fellow of the Institute of Electrical and Electronics Engineers (IEEE) in 2015 for contributions to the advancement of CMOS radio-frequency integrated circuits and device modeling.
