= Teisuke Chiba =

Japanese photographer

Teisuke Chiba (千葉 禎介, Chiba Teisuke; 1917–1965) was a Japanese amateur photographer of rural life around the area where he lived in Akita, Japan.

== Biography ==
Chiba was born in Kakunodate, Akita on 19 October 1917, and two years later moved to Yokote, Akita, an area where he would remain. After finishing high school in 1932, he started work in a kimono shop. In 1935 he bought a Rokuoh Baby Pearl camera and started photographing the rural area where he lived, particularly its everyday life, winning prizes.

Immediately after the war Chiba's photographs appeared in the contest pages of Camera and other magazines, and he became a central figure in the photographic culture of Akita (a part of Japan that would attract Ihei Kimura, Hiroshi Hamaya and other photographers). From 1952 Chiba freelanced as an Akita-based photojournalist in his free time, but after half a year in hospital he closed his kimono shop and opened a shop in Yokote selling photographic supplies. From around this time Chiba concentrated on photographically documenting the history of the area.

Chiba was hospitalized in October 1965 and died on 29 December 1965. In May of the following year, friends helped organize a posthumous exhibition of his work in Fuji Photo Salon, Tokyo. In 1992 his works were displayed prominently within an exhibition held by the Miyagi Museum of Art of postwar photography in Tōhoku.

The first booklength collection of Chiba's works came over thirty years after his death, in a slim volume of the series Nihon no Shashinka that serves as an anthology.

== Bibliography ==
- Chiba Teisuke isakushū (千葉禎介遺作集). N.p.: Chiba Teisuke Isakushū Kankōkai, 1966. A booklet of Chiba's late works.
- (in Japanese) Chiba Teisuke (千葉禎介). Nihon no Shashinka 24. Tokyo: Iwanami, 1998. ISBN 4-00-008364-3.

== Related works ==
- Nihon kindai shashin no seiritsu to tenkai (日本近代写真の成立と展開) / The Founding and Development of Modern Photography in Japan. Tokyo: Tokyo Museum of Photography, 1995.
