= Victoria Chika Ezerim =

Nigerian taekwondo practitioner

Personal information
- Full name: Victoria Chika Ezerim
- Nationality: Nigeria
- Born: Nigeria

Sport
- Sport: Taekwondo
- Event: 63 kg
Medal record
Women's taekwondo
Representing Nigeria
African Taekwondo Championships
Bronze medal – third place	2003 Abuja	63 kg

Victoria Chika Ezerim is a Nigerian taekwondo practitioner who competes in the women's senior category. She won a bronze medal at the 2003 African Taekwondo Championships in the –63 kg category.

== Sports career ==
Victoria participated at the 2003 African Taekwondo Championships held in Abuja, Nigeria, where she won a bronze medal in the –63 kg event.
