= Chi Zhiqiang =

Chinese pharmacologist (1924–2020)

- Born: November 16, 1924; Huangyan County, Zhejiang, China
- Died: January 7, 2020 (aged 95); Huadong Hospital, Shanghai, China
- Education: Zhejiang University
- Scientific career
- Fields: Pharmacology
- Workplaces: Shanghai Institute of Materia Medica, Chinese Academy of Sciences

Chinese name
- Traditional Chinese: 池志強
- Simplified Chinese: 池志强
Transcriptions
Standard Mandarin
- Hanyu Pinyin: Chí Zhìqiáng

Chi Zhiqiang (Chinese: 池志强; 16 November 1924 – 7 January 2020) was a Chinese pharmacologist and researcher at the Shanghai Institute of Materia Medica, Chinese Academy of Sciences.

== Early life and education ==
Chi was born in Huangyan County, Zhejiang, Republic of China (1912-1949), on November 16, 1924, to Chi Yun (池云), a surveying and mapping technician. He was the third of five children. He attended Huangyan Middle School and Zhejiang Provincial Taizhou High School. In 1943 he was accepted to Zhejiang University, where he graduated in 1949.

== Career ==
After university, he was assigned to Zhejiang Provincial Bureau of Culture. He joined the Chinese Communist Party in January 1949. In July 1953 he joined the Shanghai Institute of Materia Medica, Chinese Academy of Sciences, becoming its deputy director in 1978. In 1983 he was promoted to become deputy dean of the Shanghai Branch of the Chinese Academy of Sciences.

== Death ==
On January 7, 2020, he died at Huadong Hospital, in Shanghai.

== Contributions ==
In the early 1950s, schistosomiasis was widespread in the Yangtze River Basin, he participated in the study of schistosomiasis eradication.

== Honors and awards ==
- 1991 State Natural Science Award (Second Class)
- 1997 Member of the Chinese Academy of Engineering
