= Jerzy Czajka =

Polish hockey player

Personal information
- Nationality: Polish
- Born: 11 October 1942 (age 83) Poznań, Poland

Sport
- Sport: Field hockey

Jerzy Czajka (born 11 October 1942) is a Polish former field hockey player. He competed in the men's tournament at the 1972 Summer Olympics.
