= Aero-Kros MP-02 Czajka =

Polish ultralight aircraft

MP-02 Czajka
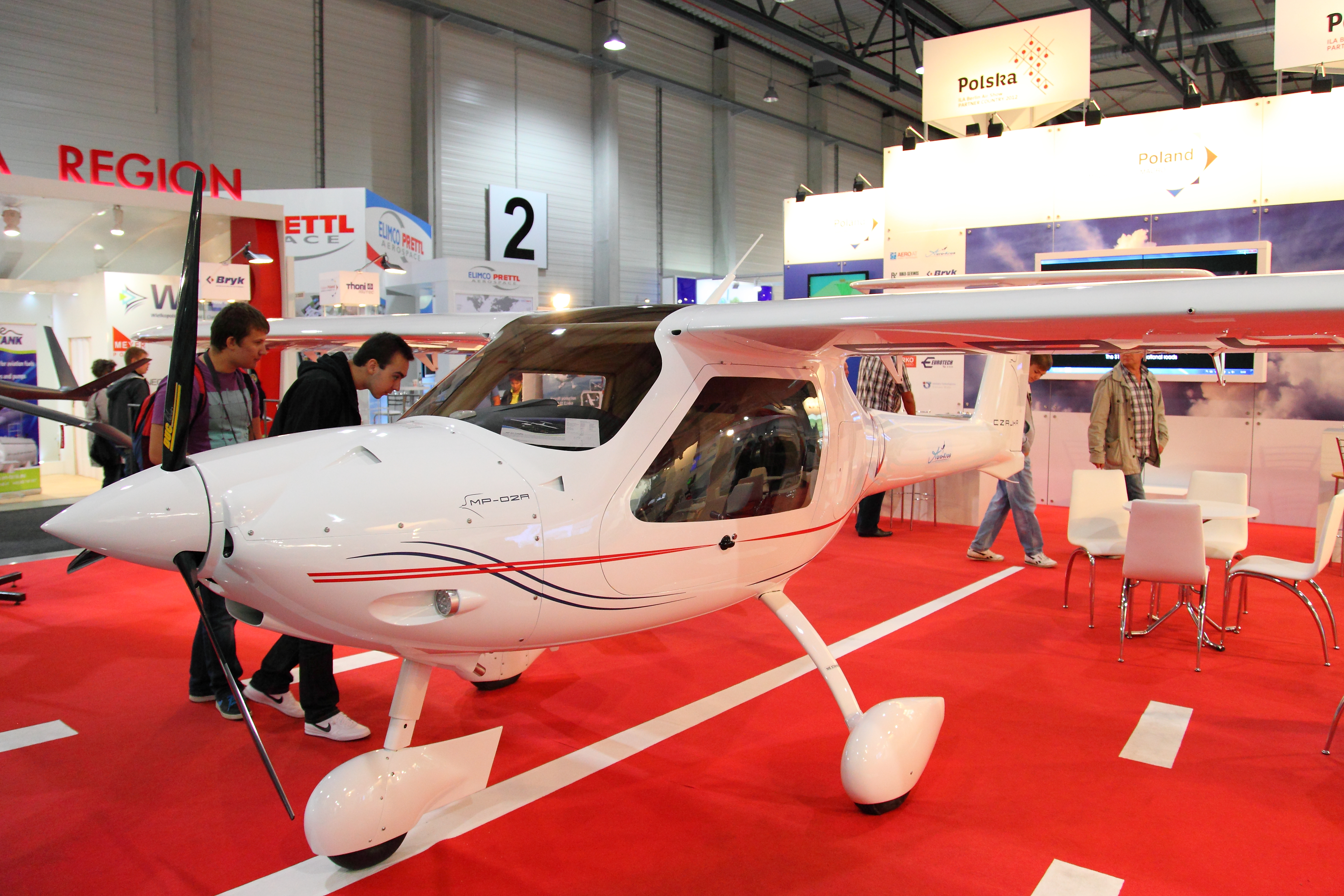

General information
- Type: Ultralight aircraft
- National origin: Poland
- Manufacturer: Aero-Kros; HMS Aviation
- Status: In production

History
- Introduction date: 2009
- First flight: 2009

The Aero-Kros MP-02 Czajka (English: Lapwing) is a Polish ultralight aircraft designed and developed by Aero-Kros of Krosno, introduced at the Aero show held in Friedrichshafen in 2009. The aircraft is supplied ready-to-fly.

Since March 2017 the design has been built by HMS Aviation, which is also located in Krosno, Poland.

== Design and development ==
The Czajka was designed to comply with the Fédération Aéronautique Internationale microlight rules and US light-sport aircraft rules. It features a cantilever high-wing, a two seats in side-by-side configuration enclosed cockpit, tricycle landing gear and a single engine in tractor configuration.

The aircraft is made from carbon-fiber-reinforced polymer. Its 9.72 m (31.9 ft) span wing employs Fowler flaps to keep the stall speed low enough for the FAI microlight category. The standard engine provided is the 100 hp (75 kW) Rotax 912ULS four-stroke powerplant which gives a cruise speed of 230 km/h (143 mph). The cockpit is 1.215 m (48 in) wide.

== Specifications (MP-02) ==
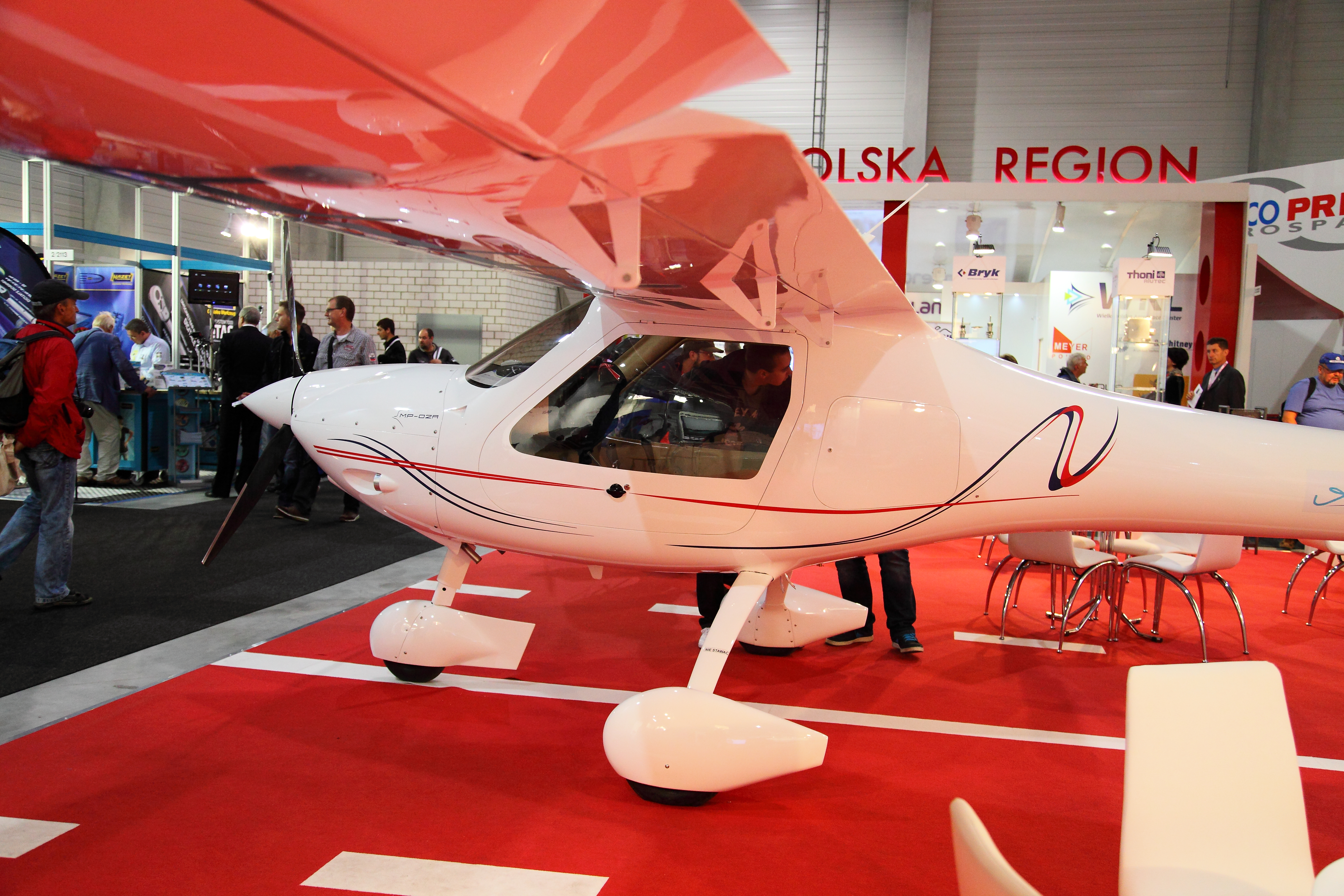
Aero-Kros MP-02 Czajka

Data from Bayerl and Tacke

General characteristics

- Crew: one
- Capacity: one passenger
- Wingspan: 9.72 m (31 ft 11 in)
- Wing area: 10.2 m^{2} (110 sq ft)
- Empty weight: 268 kg (591 lb)
- Gross weight: 472.5 kg (1,042 lb)
- Fuel capacity: 112 litres (25 imp gal; 30 US gal)
- Powerplant: 1 × Rotax 912ULS four cylinder, liquid and air-cooled, four stroke, 75 kW (101 hp)

Performance

- Maximum speed: 230 km/h (140 mph, 120 kn)
- Cruise speed: 170 km/h (110 mph, 92 kn)
- Stall speed: 65 km/h (40 mph, 35 kn)
- Rate of climb: 6.5 m/s (1,280 ft/min)
- Wing loading: 46.3 kg/m^{2} (9.5 lb/sq ft)
