= Chica (name) =

Chica is a given name, surname and nickname. Notable people known by this name include the following:

== Nickname, pen name or stage name ==
- Francisca Chica da Silva (c. 1732 – 1796), Brazilian-born slave
- Ada Jane Chica Macnab and later as Ada Munro, Scottish artist
- Chica Paula Schopf, Chilean electronic music producer and DJ
- Chica Umino, pen name of an anonymous Japanese manga artist
- Francisca Chica Xavier (1932–2020), Brazilian actress and producer
- Nhá Chica, actual name Francisca de Paula de Jesus (1810–1895), Brazilian Roman Catholic religious figure

== Given name ==
- Chica Sato, Japanese musician and fashion model

== Middle name ==
- Fernando Chica Arellano (born 1963), Spanish Roman Catholic priest and diplomat of the Holy See

== Surname ==
=== Chica ===
- Javi Chica (born 1985), Spanish footballer
- Jorge Chica (1952–2020), Ecuadorian footballer and neurosurgeon
- Patricia Chica, Canadian film and television director, producer and writer

=== De Chica and De La Chica ===
- Olga de Chica (1921–2016), Colombian neo-primitivist painter
- Julian De La Chica, Colombian composer, pianist, and record producer

=== La Chica ===
- Trish La Chica, Filipino-born American politician

== Fictional characters ==
- * Chica The Chicken, a character in the horror game Five Nights at Freddy's by Scott Cawthon

== See also ==
- Chia (surname)
- Chiba (surname)
- Chic (nickname)
- Chica (disambiguation)
- Chick (nickname)
- Chick (surname)
- Chicka (disambiguation)
- Chickie (nickname)
- Chida (surname)
- Chika (general name)
- Chika (Igbo given name)
- Chika (Japanese given name)
