= Hayato Chiba =

Japanese Mathematician

Hayato Chiba (千葉 逸人, born 18 January 1982) is a Japanese mathematician and professor at the Advanced Institute for Materials Research of Tōhoku University. He mainly concerns himself with the theory of dynamical systems, especially bifurcation theory, and proved the Kuramoto conjecture about infinite-dimensional differential equations with chaotic behavior. He obtained his doctorate degree in information sciences at the University of Kyoto.

== Education and Work ==
Chiba studied at Kyōto University's engineering department, where he graduated in 2005. He continued on to pursue a doctorate degree, studying mainly analytic mechanics and non-linear differential equations until 2009, also at the University of Kyōto.

In the third year of his undergraduate studies, Chiba published a textbook on mathematical methods in engineering with Pleiades Publishing. A textbook about analytic geometry soon followed.

Starting from 2013, he worked at Kyūshū University's research institute Mathematics for Industry as an untenured professor. During this time, he finalised and submitted his proof for the Kuramoto conjecture, which was then published in Ergodic Theory and Dynamical Systems in 2015.

2017, he appeared in a pop science TV show moderated by Naoki Matayoshi.

Following this, in 2019, he followed a call to Tōhoku University, where he is currently working as a professor of mathematics

== Publications ==
- これならわかる工学部で学ぶ数学』Pleiades Publishing, ISBN 4-7687-0862-5, 2004; a second edition, ISBN 978-4-7687-0882-8, 2006; and a third, ISBN 978-4-903814-19-3, 2009.
- ベクトル解析からの幾何学入門, Gensuugakusha, ISBN 978-4-7687-0380-9, 2007 mit Neuauflage, ISBN 978-4-7687-0466-0, 2017.
