= Chippy (nickname) =

Chippy is a nickname of:

== People ==
- Liam Brady (born 1956), Irish footballer
- George Britt (1895–1972), American baseball player in the Negro leagues
- Clive Clark (footballer) (1940–2014), English footballer
- Peter Frilingos (1944–2004), Australian sports journalist and commentator
- Chippy Gaw (1892–1968), American Major League Baseball pitcher in 1920 and college ice hockey head coach
- Chippy Gunasekara (1905–1974), first-class cricketer and lawyer from Ceylon
- Chris Hipkins (born 1978), the 41st Prime Minister of New Zealand
- Chippy McGarr (1863–1904), American baseball player
- Harry McNish (1874–1930), carpenter on Sir Ernest Shackleton's Imperial Trans-Antarctic Expedition of 1914–1917
- Willie Naughton (1870–1906), Scottish footballer
- Chippy Renjith (b. 1975), Indian actress
- David "Chippy" Robinson (1897–1967), American Prohibition-era gangster
- Chippy Simmons (1878–1937), English footballer

== Fictional characters ==
- Chippy The Blue crab (I Spy Chippy) books by Captain Jeff Debone Author and illustrator
- Starlow (referred to as Chippy by Bowser), in the video game Mario & Luigi: Bowser's Inside Story

== See also ==
- Bertha Hill (1905–1950), American blues and vaudeville singer and dancer nicknamed "Chippie"
- Chips (nickname)
