= Miyagawa Chōki =

17th-century Japanese ukiyo-e artist

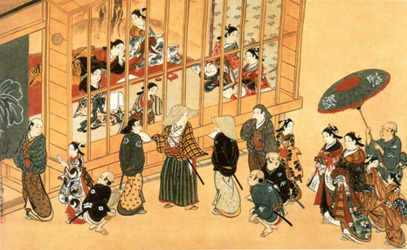
17th-century painting by Miyagawa Chōki depicting the display of prostitutes behind a grill

Miyagawa Chōki (宮川 長亀, birth and death dates unknown) was a Japanese artist active in the early 17th century who specialized in ukiyo-e paintings.

== Life and work ==
No biographical details of Chōki survive. He was a follower of Miyagawa Chōshun, and considered Chōshun's leading pupil. According to some historians, Chōki may have been Chōshun's son. His portraits sometimes rival Chōshun's soft, feline femininity, but his greatest talent is revealed in his group compositions.

Chōki's surviving works come from the Kyōhō (1716–1736) to the Kanpō eras; most are from Kyōhō. These paintings follow the style of Chōshun in depicting the tastes of the time in fine detail. The majority are set in the pleasure districts.
