= Chaika (surname) =

Chaika or Chayka (Russian: Чайка, meaning seagull) is a gender-neutral Slavic surname. It may refer to

- Alyaksandr Chayka (born 1976), Belarusian football coach
- John Chayka (born 1989), former general manager of the Arizona Coyotes
- Viktoria Chaika (born 1980), Belarusian sport shooter
- Yury Chaika (born 1951), Russian Prosecutor General

== See also ==
- Chika (general name)
