= Urasoe Chōki =

Urasoe Chki
- 浦添 朝憙

sessei of Ryukyu
- In office 1835–1852
- Preceded by: Tomigusuku Chōshun
- Succeeded by: Ōzato Chōkyō

Personal details
- Born: July 4, 1805
- Died: 1854 (aged 48–49)
- Parent: Urasoe Chōei (father)
- Chinese name: Shō Genro (尚 元魯)
- Rank: Wōji

Urasoe Wōji Chōki (浦添 王子 朝憙; 4 July 1805 – 1854), also known by his Chinese style name Shō Genro (尚 元魯), was a prince of the Ryukyu Kingdom.

Chōki was born to the royal family Urasoe Udun (浦添御殿). His father was Urasoe Chōei (浦添 朝英). Later, Chōki became the third head of Urasoe Udun.

Chōki served as sessei from 1835 to 1852. He was dispatched together with Zakimi Seifu in 1839 to celebrate Tokugawa Ieyoshi when he succeeded as shōgun of the Tokugawa shogunate. Chōki learned waka poetry from Kagawa Kageki (香川 景樹) during his journey. They sailed back the next year.

Chōki was good at waka and Classical Chinese poetry, and was designated a member of the Okinawan Thirty-Six Immortals of Poetry (沖縄三十六歌仙, Okinawa Sanjūrokkasen). Chōki had no heir, and adopted his nephew Urasoe Chōchū (浦添 朝忠) as his son.

Urasoe Chōki
Preceded by Urasoe Chōei	Head of Urasoe Udun	Succeeded by Urasoe Chōchū
Political offices
Preceded by Tomigusuku Chōshun	Sessei of Ryukyu; 1835–1852	Succeeded by Ōzato Chōkyō
