= Chick (surname) =

Chick is the surname of:

- Austin Chick (born 1971), American film director, screenwriter and producer
- Daniel Chick (born 1976), former Australian rules footballer
- Gerald Chick, Australian-Canadian curler and coach
- Harriette Chick (1875–1977), British nutritionist
- Jack Chick (1924–2016), American fundamentalist Christian cartoonist, publisher and founder of Chick Publications
- John Chick (born 1982), American football player
- John Chick (footballer) (1932–2013), Australian rules footballer
- John Stanley Chick (1897–1960), Welsh officer of the Royal Air Force
- Laura N. Chick (born 1944), American politician
- Mandy Chick, American racing driver
- Norma Chick, New Zealand professor of nursing and midwifery
- Sandra Chick (born 1947), former field hockey player from Zimbabwe
- Victoria Chick (1936–2023), American economist

== See also ==
- Chica (name)
- Chicky
