= Chick (nickname) =

Chick is a nickname, often for Charles. It may refer to:

== People ==
=== Sports ===
- Chick Albion (1890–?), American soccer goalkeeper
- Chick Autry (first baseman) (1885–1976), Major League Baseball player
- Chick Autry (catcher) (1903–1950), American Major League Baseball player
- Jimmy Childress (1932–2015), American football coach
- Ernie Choukalos (1927–1993), Canadian football and American minor league baseball player
- Chick Cray (1921–2008), English cricketer
- Chick Davies (1892–1973), American baseball player
- Charles Doak (1884–1956), American college baseball player and head coach
- Chick Evans Jr. (1890–1979), American amateur golfer and member of the World Golf Hall of Fame
- Chick Evans (coach) (1901–1976), American college football, basketball, and baseball coach
- Chick Fewster (1895–1945), Major League Baseball pitcher
- Chick Fraser (1873–1940), Major League Baseball pitcher
- Chick Fullis (1904–1946), Major League Baseball player
- Chick Fulmer (1851–1940), Major League Baseball player
- Chick Gandil (1888–1970), Major League Baseball player, ringleader of the players involved in the 1919 Black Sox scandal
- Chick Galloway (1896–1969), Major League Baseball player
- Chick Hafey (1903–1973), Hall-of-Fame Major League Baseball player
- Chick Halbert (1919–2013), American basketball player
- Chick Harbert (1915–1992), American PGA Tour golfer
- Chick Hearn (1916–2002), American sportscaster
- Chick Henderson (rugby union) (1930–2006), South African rugby union footballer and commentator
- Chick Jagade (1926–1968), American National Football League player
- Chick Jenkins (c. 1882–?), Welsh rugby union and professional rugby league footballer
- Chick King (1930–2012), Major League Baseball player
- Chick Lang (1905–1947), Canadian Hall-of-Fame jockey
- Chick Lang (American football) (1901–1976), American football player
- Chick Lathers (1888–1971), American baseball player
- Chick Maggioli (1922–2012), American National Football League player
- Chick Meehan (1893–1972), American college football player and coach
- Chick Reiser (1914–1996), American National Basketball Association player and coach
- Chick Robitaille (1879–1947), Major League Baseball pitcher
- Chick Shorten (1892–1965), Major League Baseball player
- Chick Stahl (1873–1907), Major League Baseball player
- Chick Tolson (1895–1965), Major League Baseball player
- Chick Young (born 1951), Scottish football journalist
- Chick Zamick (1926–2007), Canadian hockey player and coach

=== Arts and entertainment ===
- Arthur Everett Austin Jr. (1900–1957), American art museum director
- Chick Bullock (1898–1981), American vocalist
- Chick Chandler (1905–1988), American actor
- Chick Churchill (born 1946), keyboard player of the British rock band Ten Years After
- Chick Corea (1941–2021), American jazz pianist
- Chick Henderson (singer) (1912–1944), English singer
- Chick Morrison (1878–1924), American silent film actor
- Chick Strand (1931–2009), American experimental filmmaker
- Chick Webb (1905–1939), jazz drummer and band leader
- Chick Willis (1934–2013), American blues singer and guitarist

=== Other ===
- Chick Parsons, Jr. (1902–1988), American World War II naval officer and businessman
- Chick Tricker (died 1913), New York gangster in the 1910s

== Fictional characters ==
- the title character of the Franco-Belgian Western comic series Chick Bill
- the title character of the radio program Chick Carter, Boy Detective, which was adapted into the 1946 film serial Chick Carter, Detective, played by Lyle Talbot
- Chick Hicks, the main antagonist of the animated film Cars
- Charles “Chick” Benetto, protagonist of 2006 book For One More Day
- Chick Young, played by Bud Abbott, in Abbott and Costello Meet Frankenstein

== See also ==
- Chic (nickname)
- Chica (name)
- Chicka (disambiguation)
- Chickie (nickname)
