= Chika (footballer) =

Brazilian footballer (born 1979)

Personal information
- Full name: Celso Cardoso de Moraes
- Date of birth: 4 August 1979 (age 47)
- Place of birth: Brazil
- Height: 1.87 m (6 ft 2 in)
- Position: Defender

Senior career*
Years	Team	Apps	(Gls)
- ECUS
- Ji-Paraná
- São Gabriel
2003–2004	Okinawa Kariyushi		
2004–2007	Thespa Kusatsu	83	(11)
2010–2011	Atlético Sorocaba		
2011	Anapolina	9	(1)
2012	Campinense	2	(0)
2013	Itabaiana	4	(1)
2014	CEO	14	(1)
2014	Itabaiana	6	(1)
2015	Comercial-SP	18	(1)
2016	Altos	27	(1)
- * Club domestic league appearances and goals

Celso Cardoso de Moraess, or simply Chika (born 4 August 1979), is a Brazilian former football defender.

Celso previously played for Ji-Paraná in the Copa do Brasil.

== Club statistics ==
Club performance			League		Cup		Total	
Season	Club	League	Apps	Goals	Apps	Goals	Apps	Goals
Japan			League		Emperor's Cup		Total	
2004	Thespa Kusatsu	Football League	3	0	1	0	4	0
2005	Thespa Kusatsu	J2 League	16	1	2	0	18	1
2006	Thespa Kusatsu	J2 League	36	6	2	0	38	6
2007	Thespa Kusatsu	J2 League	30	4	0	0	30	4
Country	Japan		85	11	5	0	90	11
Total			85	11	5	0	90	11
