= Chickie (nickname) =

Chickie is a feminine nickname. Notable people associated with this name include the following:

== Given name ==
- Angela Marie Chickie Geraci Poisson, (born 1931), American field hockey player and coach
- Jessie Wanda Chickie Williams (née Crupe, 1919 – 2007), American country musician
- Charlotte Mason (coach), nicknamed "Chickie" (1945 – 2011) women's basketball and softball coach

== Fictional characters ==
- Chickie, character in Rocky V, played by Kevin Connolly
- Chickie Brown, regular character on Seasons 1-3 of Southland (TV series) played by Arija Bareikis

== See also ==
- Chic (nickname)
- Chica (name)
- Chick (nickname)
- Chicka (disambiguation)
- Chuckie (name)
- Chykie Brown
