= National Competitiveness Council of Nigeria =

Non-profit organization

The National Competitiveness Council of Nigeria (NCCN) is a private-public non-profit organisation in Nigeria. The council's mandate is to improve the attractiveness of Nigeria's economy as a place to do business in the global marketplace.

The council's operations are largely driven by the private sector, with government playing a supportive and enabling role. The Council serves as a nexus for the dialogue between business, trade unions, regulatory organisations, academia, international development organisations, think tanks, media and the Nigerian Government. The outcome of this dialogue is actionable recommendations and an implementation strategy for policies that will improve economic competitiveness and collective prosperity for Nigeria's citizens.

== History ==
The council was inaugurated by His Excellency Goodluck E. Jonathan on 4 February 2013. Former bank executive Matthias Chika Mordi was appointed as the inaugural chief executive officer.

== Structure ==
The council is chaired by the incumbent Minister of Trade and Investment. The position of vice-chair is held by an appointed private sector leader. The CEO heads the secretariat in charge of the council's executive and administrative tracks.

== Current membership ==
Members of the council are appointed by the president in consultation with the acting Minister of Trade and Investment.

=== List of members ===
1. Dr. Olusegun Aganga- NCCN Chairman - Hon Minister, Federal Ministry of Industry, Trade and Investments
2. Tony O. Elumelu- NCCN Vice-chairman - Founder, The Tony Elumelu Foundation
3. Chika Mordi- NCCN CEO - chairman, UBA Capital
4. Alhaji Aliko Dangote - Founder Dangote Group
5. Prof Augustin Esogbue - Professor and director emeritus School of Industrial and Systems Engineering Georgia Institute of Technology, Atlanta, Georgia
6. Austin Okere - Group CEO, Computer Warehouse Group
7. Bola Adesola - Managing Director/CEO, Standard Chartered Bank of Nigeria
8. Frank Aibogun - Publisher, Business Day (Nigeria) Newspaper
9. Frank Nweke II - Director General, Nigerian Economic Summit Group
10. Dr. Issac Okemini - AMC Consulting
11. Chief Kola Jamodu - President, Manufacturers Association of Nigeria
12. Dr. Nwnanze Okidigbe - Chief Economic Advisor to the President
13. Omobola Johnson - Hon. Minister, Federal Ministry of Communication Technology
14. Dr. Saad Usman - Director, (Osprey Investments) Emir of Jere
15. Dr. Obadiah Mailafia - Chef de Cabinet ACP Group of States Brussels Belgium
16. Oba Nsugbe QC, SAN - Joint Head of Pump Court Chambers
17. Yvonne Ike - chief executive officer, Renaissance Capital West Africa

=== Advisers to the Council ===
A cross-section of respected global and Nigerian institutions:

1. Professor Michael Porter of the Harvard Institute for Strategy and Competitiveness
2. Baroness Lynda Chalker of the Honorary International Investors Council
3. Dr. Juan E. Pardinas, Director, of the Mexican Institute for Competitiveness
4. Dr. Wiebe Boer of The Tony Elumelu Foundation

== Activities ==
=== Working groups ===
The NCCN initiated four working groups. The working groups draw membership from the NCCN council, the Nigerian private sector, international development bodies and consulting firms. The working groups are set up to develop recommendations and facilitate the implementation of changes to improve Nigeria's competitiveness and performance in global rankings.

Working group title	Chairman	Vice-chair
Tax, Trade and Business Enablement	Alhaji Aliko Dangote	Dr. Issac Okemini
Human Capital, Innovation and Capacity Building	Omobola Johnson	Austin Okere
Security, Corruption and Country Image	Frank Nweke II	Frank Aibogun
Bureaucracy, Titling and Registration	Chief Kola Jamodu	Oba Nsugbe QC, SAN

=== National and Sub-National Report ===
The National Competitiveness Council of Nigeria's (NCCN) “National Competitiveness Report” will expand on the framework and methodology used in the World Economic Forum's – Global Competitiveness Report and the World Bank's – Doing business report to provide insight into the challenges to improved competitiveness and assess the regulation surrounding the ease with which businesses are able to set up and operate in Nigeria. The hope is that these reports will focus discourse around competitiveness issues and provide a platform for policy changes that will result in increased competitiveness.
