= Chicka =

Chicka is a nickname that is associated with the name Charles. People known by that name include the following:

- Brian Moore (rugby league) (1944–2014), Australian former rugby league footballer and coach
- Charles Cahill (rugby league) (1916–2007), Australian rugby league footballer
- Charles Chicka Dixon (1928–2010), Australian Aboriginal activist and leader
- John Ferguson (rugby league) (born 1954), Australian rugby league
- Charles Kell (1905-1964), Australian rugby league player

== See also ==
- Chic (nickname)
- Chica (name)
- Chick (nickname)
- Chika (Igbo given name)
- Chika (Japanese given name)
- Chika (general name)
- Chickie (nickname)
