= Chunk =

Chunk may refer to:

== Fictional characters ==
- Chunk (comics), a DC Comics character
- Chunk (Toy Story 3), in the 2010 film Toy Story 3
- Chunk, in the 1985 film The Goonies
- Chunk Palmer, in Bull, a 2016 American TV series
- Chunk, in The ZhuZhus, a Canadian-American animated children's TV series
- Chunk, a character from The Ripping Friends

== Other uses ==
- Chunk (cocktail) or tschunk, a cocktail
- Chunk (information), a fragment of information used in many multimedia formats
- Chunk (collective), a musical collective and arts space in Leeds, England
- Chunk Colbert (died 1874), Old West gunfighter
- Prince Chunk (1998–2010), a 44-pound cat
- Chunks (film)

== See also ==
- C.h.u.n.k. 666, an American tall-bike club
- Chunkz, an English YouTuber
- Chunkzz, a 2017 Indian film
- Chunky (disambiguation)
- Chunking (disambiguation)
