= Chunky =

Chunky may refer to:

== People ==
- Chunky Clements (born 1994), American football player
- Liam O'Brien (hurler) (born 1949), Irish hurler
- Chunky Pandey (born 1962), stage name of Indian actor Suyash Pandey
- Ramón "Chunky" Sánchez (1951–2016), Chicano musician and activist
- Chunky Woodward (1924–1990), Canadian retailer and rancher

== Places ==
- Chunky, Mississippi, United States, a town
  - Chunky River, a tributary of the Chickasawhay River in Mississippi

== Songs ==
- "Chunky" (Format B song), 2015
- "Chunky" (Bruno Mars song), 2016

== Other uses ==
- Chunky (candy bar), a candy bar
- Chunkey, a Native American game also spelled Chunky
- Chunky Kong, a character in the video game Donkey Kong 64
- Packed pixel or "chunky", a method of frame buffer organization in computer graphics
- Chunky, a character from The Croods

== See also ==
- Chunk (disambiguation)
