= List of killings by law enforcement officers in the United States, January 2025 =

A still from bodycam video, depicting the killing of 28-year-old Brandon Zachary Adame in Fort Worth, Texas

This is a list of people reported killed by non-military law enforcement officers in the United States in January 2025, whether in the line of duty or not, and regardless of reason or method. The listing documents the occurrence of a death, making no implications regarding wrongdoing or justification on the part of the person killed or officer involved. Killings are arranged by date of the incident that caused death. Different death dates, if known, are noted in the description. The table below lists 125 people.

== January 2025 ==
| Date | Name (age) of deceased | Race | Location | Description |
|---|---|---|---|---|
| 2025-01-31 | Ty Kaiser (30) | White | Grainfield, Kansas | A sheriff's deputy responded to a home where Kaiser had been reported for hitting a relative. The deputy tased Kaiser, which was ineffective. The deputy then shot Kaiser after he allegedly charged torwards the deputy. |
| 2025-01-31 | Christopher Loyo (19) | Hispanic | Haltom City, Texas | Tarrant County Sheriff's deputies were attempting to serve a mental health warrant on Loyo. During the encounter, he stabbed a deputy in the head and caused severe injuries to his hand. Other deputies then fatally shot him. |
| 2025-01-30 | Tyler Cade Nugent (23) | White | Harrisonburg, Louisiana | Nugent shot and killed his mother and attempted to shoot his father. He barricaded himself in the home when the Special Response Team arrived. They shot and killed Nugent as he continued to resist compliance during the situation. KALB News provided contradictory details after the footage was released. Records show SRT Officers responded to the home and deployed a chemical agent to force Nugent out. However, officers only had one mask so they ended up choking on the gas themselves for over 20 minutes. After the initial encounter, news source mentioned Nugent could be heard trying to surrender while a gun was placed on a storage tub when officers opened fire. This findings disputed Lt. Ethan House's claim, one of the officer involved, as he said that Nugent was not surrendering and he fired for self-defense. Another officer involved, Dewain Littleton, was wearing a broken body-worn camera. In July 2025, the grand jury had decline to indict both officers. Additionally, because it took nearly two years and legal intervention for KALB to obtain the footage from the District Attorney, the family is now barred from filing a wrongful death lawsuit due to Louisiana's one-year statute of limitations. |
| 2025-01-30 | Nicholas Scott Sides (35) | Unknown | Fort Worth, Texas | A man barricaded himself following a traffic stop and shooting in Lake Worth. During the standoff, the man set off fireworks, pointed a gun to his head and pointed the gun at Fort Worth SWAT team after less-lethal devices were used. SWAT team members eventually fatally shot him.The footage was released. |
| 2025-01-30 | Juan Alvarez (34) | Hispanic | Paramount, California | A LASD deputy saw a man armed with a machete damaging a patrol vehicle in the parking lot of the Paramount sheriff's station. Video shows that the man approached the deputy and refused to follow commands before being fatally shot. The footage had been released. |
| 2025-01-29 | Damian Orozco (49) | Unknown | Fort Lauderdale, Florida | A marina manager directly contacted an off-duty police lieutenant to report a man causing a disturbance. The lieutenant arrived and shot Orozco after a confrontation. The lieutenant told a dispatcher that Orozco claimed he had a shotgun, but didn't have it on him. |
| 2025-01-29 | Aaron Freeman (35) | Black | New Haven, Connecticut | Police and a DEA task force were serving a search warrant when Freeman, fired at them, injuring two officers. A Waterbury Police officer killed Freeman during the shoot-out.The footage was released. |
| 2025-01-29 | Nathan Johnson (26) | White | Moncks Corner, South Carolina | Berkeley County deputies responded to a stabbing incident and pursued an armed suspect. A shootout later occurred which left the suspect dead. The deputy who shot Johnson, Dylan Vardon, was wearing a malfunctioned bodycam which did not captured the shooting. Other deputies' bodycams also did not recorded the moment of the shooting. The district attorney had found no wrongdoings in their actions and won't file charges against them. |
| 2025-01-29 | unidentified male (57) | Unknown | Murrieta, California | |
| 2025-01-29 | Jose Manuel Zamudio | Hispanic | Salinas, California | Police were alerted for an attempted homicide suspect. CHP officers spotted the suspect's vehicle and a pursuit ensued. After Zamudio crashed the vehicle, he reportedly came towards the troopers with a screwdriver before being shot by them. |
| 2025-01-29 | Blake L. Brown (33) | White | Pendleton, Indiana | |
| 2025-01-28 | William Chenoweth, Jr. (48) | White | Chelsea, Alabama | Police were attempting to conduct a pickup order for the suspect's father. Upon arrival, no one answer the door so the officers breached and entered the home. The suspect then opened fire on them and they returned fire, observing him being hit by gunfire. SWAT team later cleared the home and found him dead. His father was deceased for months possibly. |
| 2025-01-28 | Felipe Zuniga (58) | Unknown | Edinburg, Texas | Zuniga allegedly threatened his neighbor and barricaded himself in his home. During the standoff, Zuniga reportedly pointed a BB gun at SWAT team before being shot. |
| 2025-01-28 | Christopher Hackney (27) | White | Redstone Township, Pennsylvania | Redstone Township Police shot and killed a suicidal man who was reportedly making threats. |
| 2025-01-28 | Thomas Crouch Jr. (58) | White | Morehead, Kentucky | A Kentucky State trooper found a man kneeling over a woman after responding to a domestic violence call. He then fatally shot the man. |
| 2025-01-28 | Konoa Steven Wilson (16) | Black | San Diego, California | A teenager shot at Wilson at a train station in Downtown San Diego. As Wilson fled, an officer who overheard the gunfire encountered Wilson and shot him. Wilson reportedly had a firearm on his person, but it was not in his hands and there was no evidence he had attempted to fire it. The teenager who shot at Wilson was later arrested. In December, the city of San Diego agreed to pay $30 million to Wilson's family in what is believed to be the largest settlement for a police killing in the United States, surpassing the $27 million paid to George Floyd's family in 2021. |
| 2025-01-28 | unidentified male | Unknown | Leander, Texas | Travis County deputies responded to a call and found the caller's father was holding his mother at gunpoint. A deputy shot and killed the man. |
| 2025-01-27 | Richard Saunders | Unknown | Hanford, California | An officer pulled Saunders over for riding a bicycle without a taillight. The two argued, and the officer threw Saunders to the ground, where he hit his head. He fell unconscious and died in the hospital 17 days later. The officer was later charged with manslaughter and assault. |
| 2025-01-27 | Latoia Renee Philpott (41) | Black | Stow, Ohio | Benjamin Asiedu, a Summit County Sheriff's deputy, shot Philpott before killing himself in a Murder–suicide situation. Philpott was Asiedu's girlfriend. |
| 2025-01-27 | Cheasarack Chong (34) | Asian | San Francisco, California | Chong shot and wounded a dispensary owner before barricading himself in a nearby building. Police fatally shot Chong after he allegedly fired at them. |
| 2025-01-27 | Daniel Joseph James Palenik (45) | White | Storm Lake, Iowa | Palenik fled a traffic stop after reportedly speeding then barricaded himself in his residence. During the standoff, he fired at officers. Officers eventually fired back, killing him. |
| 2025-01-27 | Juan Sanchez (54) | Unknown | Elkhart, Indiana | Two people, 19-year-old Annasue Rocha and 49-year-old Benjamin Jeffrey, were fatally shot inside of a Martin's Super Market. The suspected killer, Sanchez, was fatally shot in a shootout with Elkhart Police outside the store. Two police officers were injured during the exchange of gunfire. |
| 2025-01-26 | Sheldon Ennis | Unknown | New York City, New York | During an encounter between NYPD officers and Ennis, Ennis fled on foot before officers pursued him. One officer tackled him and both fell onto the ground. Ennis was sent to a hospital where he was pronounced dead.The footage was released. |
| 2025-01-26 | Phou Thone Onemanivong (42) | Asian | Arvada, Colorado | A man entered a stolen vehicle before shooting at Arvada officers. They returned fire, killing him. |
| 2025-01-26 | Daniel Gino Harris (20) | Unknown | Albuquerque, New Mexico | Three suspects robbed the Walgreens and one of them fired a shot before leaving. APD tracked the suspects by the trackers on the money. They shot and killed one of the suspects, Harris, who was holding a rifle. Other suspects were arrested later. |
| 2025-01-26 | Jeremiah Bailey (48) | White | Tampa, Florida | After an altercation with one of the victims, the suspect started a rampage targeting random people, killing one and injuring three. Tampa police officers later tracked the suspect and performed PIT maneuver on the suspect's car. The suspect reached for something and was shot dead by officers. Three officers were injured. The suspect was also involved in another hit and run incident. |
| 2025-01-26 | Matthew Huttle (42) | White | Rensselaer, Indiana | A sheriff's deputy fatally shot Huttle during an altercation at a traffic stop. The shooting occurred several days after around 1,500 people, including Huttle, were pardoned by President Donald Trump for their involvement in the January 6 United States Capitol attack.The footage was released. |
| 2025-01-25 | Jerry Wayne Thompson (55) | White | Greensburg, Kansas | KHP troopers attempted to stop a homicide suspect, Thompson, but he fled. During the chase, troopers used stop sticks on his vehicle, which caused his car to crash. He was ejected from the car and died at the scene. |
| 2025-01-25 | Bryson McCray (36) | White | Atchison, Kansas | Atchison Police responded to a report about an armed man breaking into an apartment. Upon arrival, McCray fired several shots at them and fled to a nearby residence, holding a woman hostage. Police stated that McCray fired more shots at them when they attempted to negotiate with him. During the rescue attempt, a KHP trooper shot McCray. He died two days later. |
| 2025-01-25 | Gabriel Jesus Garza (40) | Hispanic | San Diego, California | A man was reportedly acting violent and bit a security guard when he was removing him. He was then restrained and handcuffed by the security guard, a San Diego officer and another individual. He later became unresponsive and was pronounced deceased at a hospital. |
| 2025-01-25 | Matthew Steven Rollie (29) | White | Arcadia, Florida | Rollie had an active warrant out of Georgia, where he was wanted for child sex crime. During a traffic stop, Rollie, who was the passenger, opened fire on DeSoto County deputies, striking one of them multiple times. They fired back and killed him. The wounded deputy is expected to survive. |
| 2025-01-24 | Isaiah La’Ron Treadway (22) | Black | Alexandria, Louisiana | A deputy who was working off-duty confronted a shoplifting suspect. The man reportedly violently resisted before being shot. |
| 2025-01-24 | Brandon Allen Mitchell (36) | White | Des Moines, Iowa | Police were attempting to arrest Mitchell for a parole violation at a home. Mitchell was located inside a closet, where he allegedly told officers he was armed with a gun. Officers shot and killed Mitchell after hearing a loud noise from inside the closet, believing they were being fired upon. However, no gun was found at the scene. |
| 2025-01-24 | Luis Fuentes (39) | Hispanic | Lancaster, Pennsylvania | Police fatally shot Fuentes, a suspected bank robber armed with a machete, as he fled on foot. |
| 2025-01-24 | Zachiry Derrek Kerschner (30) | White | Bensalem Township, Pennsylvania | Police shot and killed Kerschner after an armed stand-off. A passenger in Kerschner's vehicle was unharmed. |
| 2025-01-24 | Mason Toloff (32) | White | Kasilof, Alaska | Police responded to a call of a man firing shots and yelling. Upon arrival, despite negotiation efforts, Toloff shot a trooper and pointed the shotgun at SWAT team members, prompting them to return fire, killing him. |
| 2025-01-24 | Osean McClintock (26) | White | Fountain Valley, California | Police responded to reports of a man trying to enter an occupied vehicle. Officers pursued the man through a gas station, bank, and parking lot, ending with a struggle between the suspect and an officer in her vehicle, in which he stole a gun from a female officer. The man then stole the police car and crashed into a nearby postal van, and an officer shot the man after he pointed a gun at them.The footage was released. |
| 2025-01-24 | Jeremiah Boshard (45) | White | Boulder City, Nevada | An off-duty Las Vegas Police officer and his wife reportedly shot and killed a man who was punching and strangling a woman in their front yard. |
| 2025-01-24 | Anthony Williams (23) | White | Albuquerque, New Mexico | Police responded to a home invasion call. Upon arrival, a shootout occurred which an officer was shot and the suspect, Willimas, was killed. A resident was also struck by gunfire. |
| 2025-01-24 | Cody Dennis (27) | White | Ocala, Florida | A FHP trooper shot and killed a suspect who was in custody, reportedly after a physical altercation in a hospital. |
| 2025-01-23 | Gabriel Vassandani Soto (19) | Hispanic | Cataño, Puerto Rico | Officers pulled over a suspected vehicle near a baseball park. A shoot-out occurred, which left Vassandani Soto dead and the other suspect injured. |
| 2025-01-23 | Sean Michael Scates (45) | White | Greenville, South Carolina | |
| 2025-01-23 | Devario C. Edwards (28) | Black | Wichita, Kansas | Police responded to the parking lot of an aerospace company after Edwards began live-streaming about having a rifle and attempting suicide by cop. When officers arrived, Edwards fired at them, and police shot him in a shoot-out. Police had been monitoring Edwards following an earlier incident where he was arrested for pointing a rifle at another man. |
| 2025-01-22 | Melvin Cancer (53) | White | Pearl, Mississippi | Cancer's family members received a report of Cancer dying of a heart attack in Central Mississippi Correctional Facility. A year later, records show Cancer died of blunt force trauma after an "altercation with prison guards." Cancer was believed to be beaten to death during the situation. His death was ruled a homicide and FBI is investigating. |
| 2025-01-22 | Joseph Como (29) | Hispanic | St. Clair Township, Columbiana County, Ohio | Police responded to reports of a suicidal man. During the encounter, Como approached Officer Wetzel with a Derringer 38 special pistol in his hand and refused to stop. Wetzel then fired shots in the direction of him, which is also the direction of the dentist office behind. Como was able to lift his hand and fired a shot which hit Wetzel in the head, leaving him in critical condition. Martin, a girl in the dentist office, was also shot in the head by a bullet fired by Officer Wetzel. She was left in critical condition and later died. |
| 2025-01-22 | Rosalie Martin (4) | Black | St. Clair Township, Columbiana County, Ohio | |
| 2025-01-22 | Brandon Scott Poulos (46) | White | San Antonio, Texas | SAPD responded to a suicide in progress call and encountered Poulos, who barricaded himself and shot seven officers. SWAT team later entered the house and found him dead. His death was ruled homicide by coroner's office a few days later, possibly killed by police gunfire. |
| 2025-01-22 | David McKinney (48) | Unknown | Yuma, Arizona | US Marshals shot and killed McKinney, a double homicide suspect, after he fired at them with a rifle.U.S. Customs and Border Protection released their bodycam footage. |
| 2025-01-22 | Frankie Davis (34) | Unknown | Gallup, New Mexico | A man was reportedly firing a gun and pointing it at himself. When GPD arrived, they discharged less-lethal devices at him but they were ineffective. The man then pointed the shotgun at them before being shot. |
| 2025-01-22 | Howard Peterson (66) | Asian | Roswell, New Mexico | A police officer who was responding to a call with lights and sirens on crashed into Peterson's vehicle, which led to his death. |
| 2025-01-22 | Shawn Lee Baker (42) | White | Salem, Oregon | Baker was wanted by the police. He led Salem officers on a foot chase and was armed with a handgun. During the confrontation, he was fatally shot by the officers. In February, grand jury justified the case and the footage was released to public. |
| 2025-01-21 | Jeffery Lach (33) | White | Memphis, Tennessee | |
| 2025-01-21 | George Delgado (45) | Unknown | Los Angeles, California | Police responded to a report about a woman's boyfriend threatening her with a handgun. The suspect was shot and killed after shooting at deputies. |
| 2025-01-21 | Antonio Rodrigues (70) | White | Raleigh, North Carolina | Raleigh Police responded to a burglary in progress at a home. Upon arrival, they were met by gunfire. The suspect was killed and an officer sustained serious injuries. Another man was killed by Rodrigues, according to his wife. In April, the County DA justified the use of force against Rodrigues. |
| 2025-01-20 | Nolan Ward (27) | White | Greenville, North Carolina | A man armed with a gun was threatening to harm himself at ECU North Recreational Complex. Greenville Police fatally shot him after he allegedly pointed the gun at them. |
| 2025-01-20 | Ophelia Baukholt (30) | White | Coventry, Vermont | Border Patrol agent David C. Maland and Baukholt, a German national from Freiburg im Breisgau, were killed in a shoot-out. Police were surveilling Baukholt and another suspect for expired travel visa. During a traffic stop, Baukholt's company shot Maland and agents returned fired, killing Baukholt as she attempted to pulled out a gun. Another suspect, an American female from Washington, was taken into federal custody. FBI Albany is leading the investigation. The shooting was connected to the rationalist group called the Zizians. |
| 2025-01-19 | Aaron Blount-Beaver (46) | Unknown | Grand Junction, Colorado | Blount-Beaver struck his neighbor with a handgun. Following a stand-off, Blount-Beaver exited his home and fired at police, who returned fire and killed him. The neighbor later died from his injuries. |
| 2025-01-19 | Matthew Vincent Phillips (41) | White | Hudson, Florida | Pasco County deputies were attempting to serve a warrant on Phillips for his arrest. Upon arrival, Phillips reportedly fought with a K9 and the K9 handler with a gun in his hand. He was shot dead by deputies after refusing to drop his gun. |
| 2025-01-19 | unidentified male | Unknown | Fort Lauderdale, Florida | |
| 2025-01-18 | Ian Cheng (22) | Asian | Alhambra, California | A suicidal man who was armed with a knife advanced toward officers with aggressive manner when police opened fire. |
| 2025-01-18 | Cameron David James (26) | Unknown | Grantville, Georgia | During a traffic stop, when troopers attempted to arrest James, he reportedly resisted and allegedly reached for the gun in his car. A trooper then shot him. James returned to his car and ended up crashing on the side of the road. He died at the scene. |
| 2025-01-18 | Glenn Bohne Jr. (46) | White | River Ridge, Louisiana | Some time before 4 A.M., Bohne shot his daughters and his wife inside a home. Bohne's wife, 40-year-old Dung Pham and his 2-year-old daughter, Amy Bohne, were killed. Bohne's other two daughters, ages 9 and 13 were wounded. Bohne was shot in a bedroom by an unknown number of Jefferson Parish Sheriff's Office deputies after reportedly brandishing a firearm. |
| 2025-01-17 | Lawrence Harris (44) | Unknown | Victorville, California | The footage had been released. |
| 2025-01-17 | Shawn Austin Ravert (36) | White | Englewood, Florida | Ravert was reportedly acting erratically and on drugs. When the Charlotte County Sheriff’s Office deputies arrived, Ravert stated "shoot me" while wielding a machete. He was then shot and killed by two deputies. |
| 2025-01-17 | Gerardo Almazan (38) | Unknown | Tulsa, Oklahoma | A boy called 911 from a gas station to report that Almazan robbed him at gunpoint and took his phone at his home. After police arrived at the home, they commanded Almazan to leave the home, but Almazan refused, and a standoff commenced. After hours, Almazan came out of the house with a woman and a gun. After acting aggressively, officers opened fire and killed him. |
| 2025-01-17 | Matthew Robert Taylor (40) | Unknown | Roswell, Georgia | At midday, Roswell detectives with North Fulton SWAT officers were attempting to execute a search warrant and multiple arrest warrants for Taylor at his home. During the encounter, Taylor fired his gun and hit a SWAT officer in the chest. That officer returned fire, killing him. |
| 2025-01-17 | Christopher Alan Phillips (45) | Unknown | Phoenix, Arizona | Phoenix Police responded to a call regarding someone trespassing in an abandoned building and encountered Phillips, who then fled. During the chase, he suddenly pointed a gun at officers. One of the officers fired his department issued rifle, killing him. |
| 2025-01-16 | Michael Lewis Schwartz (53) | White | Punta Gorda, Florida | Schwartz was seen walking around the road waving a handgun. An hours-long confrontation occurred which officers eventually fatally shot him. They claimed that he pointed a gun at them. |
| 2025-01-16 | Mason French (63) | Black | Alliance, Ohio | Officers were called on Thursday morning in Alliance Towers for shots fired where they encountered a man armed with a gun and a deceased woman. Police then fatally shot the man.The footage was released. |
| 2025-01-15 | Octavio Hernandez (32) | Hispanic | Rancho Calaveras, California | During a manhunt, Hernandez, who was wanted for theft of a firearm, was spotted near a river after he abandoned a stolen car and fled into a heavily wooded area. The next morning, Police & SWAT teams arrived to deescalate the situation. However, at 3:25 PM, Hernandez decided to open fire on law enforcement. They subsequently returned fire, killing him. |
| 2025-01-15 | unidentified male | Unknown | Wide Ruins, Arizona | Police responded to a stabbing incident near Arizona-New Mexico border. Police fatally shot the suspect. |
| 2025-01-15 | Alexander James Russom (39) | White | Mountain City, Tennessee | Deputies were attempting to serve a search warrant and the suspect, Russom, shot at them, injuring a K9. They fired back, killing him. He reportedly previously evaded authorities during a pursuit in December, 2024. |
| 2025-01-15 | Brandon Perkins (40) | White | St. John, Indiana | An officer responding to a domestic disturbance fatally shot Perkins during an altercation. |
| 2025-01-15 | Kimberly Lannigan (59) | Unknown | Navasota, Texas | DPS responded to a report of forgery at Prosperity Bank and confronted a female suspect who was allegedly attempting to cash a fraudulent check. The suspect fled and led police on a pursuit on Highway 6. During the pursuit, the suspect began driving on the opposite lane. To prevent the suspect from ramming into other individuals, Sergeant Mark Butler intentionally collided head-on with the Jeep, which resulted the death of himself and the suspect. |
| 2025-01-15 | Robert Lee Davis III / Sean Christopher Davis (56) | Black | Houston, Texas | Davis fatally shot Brazoria County Deputy Jesus Vargas. Davis then hid in a dumpster for several hours during the manhunt. When the U.S. Marshal K9 unit found him, he shot the K9 before being fatally shot by an officer. |
| 2025-01-15 | Brandon Zachary Adame (28) | Hispanic | Fort Worth, Texas | During a domestic disturbance investigation, officers saw a man inside the home with a knife acting aggressively. When they got inside, Adame allegedly charged at them with a knife before being shot. Body-cam video of Adame's killing was released to the public on January 24. |
| 2025-01-15 | Jackson Paul Jones (33) | White | Florence, Alabama | Jones called 911 to report he was about to shoot up the police department, before arriving at the department and firing several shots. Officers returned fire, killing him. No officers were injured. |
| 2025-01-15 | unidentified male | Unknown | Auburn, Washington | During a traffic stop, the suspect got into an altercation and pulled out a gun. The officer stated the man used the gun in a threatening way before he shot him. |
| 2025-01-13 | Durell Dorn (37) | Black | Florissant, Missouri | A man drove into a pile of snow, and started to shoot at random cars after he exited his vehicle. Then a shootout ensued between him and St. Louis County officers. He was eventually struck by a police car and died in a hospital. |
| 2025-01-13 | unidentified male | Unknown | Metairie, Louisiana | Deputies responded for a medical call. While the man was being evaluated by medical staff, he ran away and was handcuffed by deputies. He then collapsed and later died. |
| 2025-01-13 | Andrew Christian Engel (26) | White | San Diego, California | San Diego Police responded to a call from a person who said their roommate, Engel, had attempted suicide at their apartment complex. Police said Engel was armed with a knife and threatening officers. Police shot and killed Engel after ordering him to drop the knife. |
| 2025-01-13 | Derrick Williams (45) | Unknown | Washington, D.C. | When D.C. Police officers attempted to apprehend the suspect, he produced a gun and shot three of them. The officers returned fire, killing the suspect. The three officers received non-fatal injuries. The prosecutors had ruled the shooting justified and won't pursue charges. No body camera footage of the incident has been shared with the public. |
| 2025-01-12 | Steven Espinoza (36) | Hispanic | Upland, California | Police responded to an apartment where Espinoza's sister said he had a knife and was threatening to harm himself. Officers pursued Espinoza to a residential area, where officers shot him after he reached to his waistband. Police said they recovered two knives. |
| 2025-01-12 | Jose Evans (42) | Hispanic | North Riverside, Illinois | Police were called for a disturbance involving a man, Evans, armed with two knives. Police said one officer shot Evans to defend another person. Evans died of his injuries at a hospital. |
| 2025-01-12 | Alecandro A. Castaneda (23) | Unknown | Centralia, Washington | A Centralia police, who after responding to a "domestic dispute call", fatally shot a man, reportedly after a fight. |
| 2025-01-11 | Devin L. Shields (23) | Black | Gary, Indiana | Police were dispatched after a mother called 911 during a family dispute. Upon arrival, the mother warned officers that her son, Devin L. Shields, had a firearm. Officers opened fire on Shields because he "posed a threat to the mother and officers on scene." Shields was taken to a hospital where he succumbed to his injuries. |
| 2025-01-11 | unidentified male | Black | Tampa, Florida | Officers responded to a man acting erratically in a supermarket, but the man left before officers arrived. Later, the same man approached an officer at a bank stating he was followed. The officer realized he was the man from the supermarket and took him to a clinic while in custody. There, the man began yelling at the staff and fell unconscious after he started foaming at the mouth. He was rushed to a hospital where he was revived by paramedics but later died. |
| 2025-01-11 | Colton Maxwell Floren (24) | White | Pineville, North Carolina | Pineville Police responded to a call regarding a bar customer with 2 additional firearms on him. During the encounter, the man ignored the officers' commands, approached he officer, and made a sudden gesture. At which point, the officer shot and killed him. |
| 2025-01-11 | Brian Rolstad (43) | White | Los Angeles, California | A stabbing suspect, Rolstad, approached officers with a knife despite less-lethal means before being fatally shot.LAPD released the footage. |
| 2025-01-11 | Benjamin Prowell (34) | Black | Maumelle, Arkansas | Police were assisting medical professionals while responding to a disturbance. Prowell allegedly pulled out a knife, leading the officers to shoot him. |
| 2025-01-10 | Turrell Dantae Clay (33) | Black | Phoenix, Arizona | Police used less-lethal tools to take Clay into custody. Clay then stated he had a hard time breathing. They transported him to a hospital where he died. |
| 2025-01-09 | Zachary Chavez (33) | Unknown | Albuquerque, New Mexico | APD officers arrived at a parking lot and found Chavez arguing with other people. Officers tried to take Chavez into custody and use force to place him in handcuffs. During the struggle, Chavez lost consciousness. Police attempted life-saving measures but was Chavez later declared dead. |
| 2025-01-09 | Alec Edward Shaw (19) | White | Washington, North Carolina | Shaw was seen carrying a rifle. When the deputies ordered him to drop it, he refused and shot at them. They fired back, killing him. |
| 2025-01-09 | unidentified male (24) | Black | Amarillo, Texas | Police responded to a 911 hang-up call. When they encountered the individual, the individual opened fire on them. They returned fire, killing him. |
| 2025-01-09 | Chandler Grillone (32) | White | Salt Lake City, Utah | During a traffic stop, an uninvolved man attacked a Salt Lake City Police officer with a weapon, refusing to follow commands. The officer then shot and killed him. This incident marks the fifth fatal police shooting in Utah in less than two weeks. |
| 2025-01-09 | Roberson Fertil (31) | Black | Fort Lauderdale, Florida | Police and fire crews responded to a fire at a home and encountered an individual throwing incendiary devices. An officer shot and killed the individual. |
| 2025-01-09 | Vicky L. Hollingsworth (55) | White | Kokomo, Indiana | While a Kokomo officer was traveling northbound, a vehicle entered the northbound lanes directly in front of the officer, which resulted in a collision. The male driver was injured and the female passenger, Hollingsworth, died at the scene. |
| 2025-01-08 | Dillon Siebeck (46) | White | Glendale, Arizona | Police responded to a report of a woman claiming that she had been threatened by a man with a gun. They found a man matching the suspect's description and ordered him to show his hands, but he allegedly reached toward his waistband instead. An officer opened fire, killing him. Later police stated that the man, Siebeck, who was killed by police, was not involved and had no weapon. The original suspect was found dead at the scene, sustaining a self-inflicted gunshot wound. |
| 2025-01-08 | Gustavo Benitez (28) | Hispanic | Pixley, California | During a traffic stop, deputies removed three of four suspects from a vehicle after finding alcohol and open containers inside. One of the suspects, Benitez, refused to leave and shot at the officers. The officers returned fire and killed him. |
| 2025-01-08 | Carl Lewis (51) | White | Kirksville, Missouri | A man was shot dead by an officer after reportedly charging at them with a knife. |
| 2025-01-08 | Patricia Hepworth (66) | White | Fort Wayne, Indiana | A woman with a felony parole violation warrant was fatally shot by Fort Wayne Police. Hepworth charged at the officers when officers tried to arrest her.The footage was released by Fort Wayne Police in November. |
| 2025-01-07 | unidentified male | Unknown | Marysville, Washington | The suspect’s car dragged an officer before the officer shot him. The suspect then drove the car into Costco and caught on fire. He died at the scene. |
| 2025-01-07 | Adam MacLean (50) | White | Round Rock, Texas | MacLean was reportedly driving erratically and crashed his car. When the police found him with a drone, he fired at it. He also shot at SWAT when they approached before being shot. He was found dead with a self-inflicted wound and wounds caused by police gunfire. |
| 2025-01-06 | Robert Douglas Smith (42) | Unknown | Atlanta, Georgia | A Fulton County Sheriff’s Office deputy was notified of a robbery in progress at a doughnut store. When he located the suspect, the suspect began shooting at him, wounding him. He then returned fire and killed him. Police later discovered that the suspect, Smith, had shot two employees during the robbery. |
| 2025-01-06 | Jesus Rubio (28) | Hispanic | Hobbs, New Mexico | Two state police officers were conducting a traffic stop on a white Dodge Charger. The New Mexico State Police said Rubio exited his vehicle and raised his hands "as if pointing a firearm". Rubio did not have a weapon on him. |
| 2025-01-06 | unidentified male (35) | Black | Houston, Texas | Two officers responded to reports of a man slashing tires in the northeast part of the city. One officer struggled with the suspect, during which he reached for the officer's holstered weapon and tackled him on the ground. The other officer then shot the man in the back and head, killing him. |
| 2025-01-05 | Ke'Jah Andreas (32) | Black | Saint Croix, U.S. Virgin Islands | Police responded to a domestic violence call from an apartment complex, where a woman reported Andreas had a gun and was threatening to kill her. Responding officers shot and killed Andreas in a shootout. |
| 2025-01-05 | Jakarta Jackson (21) | Black | Rock Island, Illinois | While officers were attempting to detain a suspicious individual, the individual fled and dragged an officer with his car. The officer then fatally shot the individual. |
| 2025-01-04 | Steven Antoine Dean (40) | Black | Macon, Georgia | Daniel Dean was wanted on charges of felony child molestation and several others. He fled a traffic stop and a pursuit ensued. During the chase, deputies performed PIT maneuver on his vehicle, which caused his brother, Steven Antoine Dean, the passenger, to eject from the vehicle and died. Daniel Dean sustained serious injuries. |
| 2025-01-04 | Edgar Maddison Welch (36) | White | Kannapolis, North Carolina | Welch and another person were pulled over by police. During the traffic stop, officers attempted to arrest Welch after learning he had an outstanding warrant. Police fatally shot Welch after he allegedly pointed a handgun at them. Welch had previously been arrested in 2016 after he fired three gunshots at Comet Ping Pong, a restaurant targeted by the Pizzagate conspiracy theory. |
| 2025-01-04 | Austin Schepers (33) | White | Louisville, Kentucky | Schepers was wanted for allegedly shooting a sheriff's deputy in West Baden Springs, Indiana. Schepers was located at a residence in Louisville, where officers fatally shot him after he allegedly shot at them. |
| 2025-01-03 | Marvin Martin (63) | Black | Orlando, Florida | Martin, who was allegedly wielding a gun outside a gas station and refused to drop it, was fatally shot by an officer. |
| 2025-01-03 | Daevon Montez Saint-Germain (18) | Black | Knoxville, Tennessee | While deputies were attempting to arrest Saint-Germain while conducting a search warrant, he allegedly displayed a gun and was shot by deputies. |
| 2025-01-03 | unidentified juvenile (17) | Unknown | South Jordan, Utah | A vehicle theft suspect exchanged fire with multiple agencies twice before being fatally shot. |
| 2025-01-03 | Tanner Cottrell (27) | White | Riverton, Utah | Police pursued an arson suspect, Cottrell, out of Orem, eventually ending the chase in Riverton. Cottrell was shot and killed by police following a shootout. |
| 2025-01-03 | Timothy Glaze (58) | Black | Chicago, Illinois | A man who approached officers with a knife was fatally shot by two officers after they were called to an apartment building. |
| 2025-01-02 | unidentified male (37) | Unknown | Kissimmee, Florida | According to the Florida Highway Patrol, an Orange County Sheriff's deputy lost control of his vehicle because of a mechanical issue. His car disabled in one of the oncoming lanes. A driver who was unable to yield struck the deputy's car and died at a hospital. |
| 2025-01-02 | Charquan Mylick Hargrove (32) | Black | Des Moines, Iowa | A man with felony warrants, Hargrove, allegedly fired at the DMPD officers before being killed by returned fire. |
| 2025-01-01 | Henry Gonzalez Jr (55) | White | Santa Ana, California | Police responded to a report of a man restraining a woman. Upon arrival, they encountered Gonzalez holding his mother from behind with a knife. An officer shot him. He was sent to a hospital where he later died. |
| 2025-01-01 | William Clark Littlefield (52) | Unknown | Redding, California | Littlefield reportedly threatened to blow up a vehicle while attempting to harm himself. When police arrived, a violent confrontation occurred and two deputies fatally shot Littlefield. |
| 2025-01-01 | Sidney Glasper (43) | Black | Little Rock, Arkansas | A man who fatally stabbed a woman and injured another was fatally shot by police. They stated that the suspect approached them with a knife and did not follow commands. |
| 2025-01-01 | Erik Bertelsen (35) | White | West Valley City, Utah | Police fatally shot Bertelsen, who is believed to have killed his parents at their home. |
| 2025-01-01 | Michael Bright (64) | White | Carson City, Nevada | On New Year's Eve, police responded to a domestic dispute call and learned that the suspect, Bright, had threatened to shoot the officers. During the encounter, Bright barricaded himself in a truck and exchanged fire with officers twice. He was fatally shot by police in the early morning. |
| 2025-01-01 | Kobie Davis (25) | Black | St. Louis, Missouri | An off-duty Leadington officer working as bar security shot and killed a man, Davis, allegedly armed with a gun. |
| 2025-01-01 | Shamsud-Din Bahar Jabbar (42) | Black | New Orleans, Louisiana | Jabbar reportedly drove a pickup truck into a crowd of people on Bourbon Street in the French Quarter, killing 14 and injuring 35. Shortly after colliding into a crane, Jabbar exited the vehicle. He reportedly began firing an assault rifle before being shot by New Orleans police officers. Two officers were shot and injured in the shooting. |

== See also ==
- Death in custody § United States
- Henry A. Wallace Police Crime Public Database
- List of cases of police brutality
- List of countries with annual rates and counts for killings by law enforcement officers
- List of law enforcement officers killed in the line of duty in the United States
- List of law enforcement officers convicted for an on-duty killing in the United States
- List of shootings by US immigration agents
- List of police reforms related to the George Floyd protests
- List of unarmed African Americans killed by law enforcement officers in the United States
- Lists of killings by law enforcement officers
- Police brutality in the United States
- Police misconduct § United States
- Police riot § United States
- Police use of deadly force in the United States
