= Ching =

Ching may refer to:

== People ==
- Ching, a unisex given name
  - Ching He Huang, a food writer and TV chef
  - Ching Hammill (1902–1925), American football player
  - Ching Johnson (1898–1979), Canadian National Hockey League player
  - Willis Augustus Lee (1888–1945), World War II US Navy vice admiral nicknamed "Ching"
  - Ching Lau Lauro, stage name of an English magician popularly known as Ching (flourished 1827–1840), true identity unknown
  - Ching Shih (1775–1844), also known as Madame Ching, a notorious and highly successful Chinese pirate
- Ching (surname), a romanization of some Chinese surnames such as Jing, Qing, Cheng and Zhuang

== Other uses ==
- Ching (instrument), a Thai and Cambodian musical instrument
- "Ching" (song), a single from Swami's album Equalize (2007)
- Ching, a fictional 12-year-old Chinese swordswoman in the TV show Pucca
- Qing dynasty of Imperial China, romanized as "Ch'ing" in Wade–Giles
- River Ching, a tributary of the River Lea in north east London

== See also ==
- Jing (disambiguation) (Ching is the Wade–Giles equivalent of Jing)
- Qing (disambiguation) (Ch'ing is the Wade–Giles equivalent of Qing)
- Chink (disambiguation)
- I Ching (disambiguation)
- Chung Ching (disambiguation)
