= Yijing (disambiguation) =

Yijing or I Ching is a Chinese classic text.

Yijing may also refer to:

== People ==
- Yijing (monk) (635–713), Chinese Buddhist monk during the Tang dynasty
- Yijing (prince) (1793–1853), Manchu prince of the Qing dynasty

== Places in China ==
Shanxi

- Yijing, Shenchi County, a town in Shenchi County
- Yijing Subdistrict, Taiyuan, a subdistrict of Jinyuan District, Taiyuan
- Yijing Subdistrict, Yangquan, a subdistrict of Chengqu, Yangquan
- Yijing Township, Shanxi, a township in Ying County

Other provinces

- Yijing Township, Anhui, a township in Changfeng County, Anhui
- Yijing, Hebei, a town in Handan, Hebei
- Yijing Station, metro station at Shenzhen, Guangdong

== See also ==
- I Ching (disambiguation)
