= Chongqing (disambiguation) =

Chongqing, formerly romanized as Chungking, is a municipality of China.

Chongqing, Chungking, or Chung King may also refer to:

== People ==
- Chongqing (崇慶; 1212–1213), era name used by Wanyan Yongji, Jin dynasty emperor
- Chungking (band), British indie pop group
- Empress Xiaoshengxian was known as Empress Dowager Chongqing during the reign of her son, the Qianlong Emperor

== Places ==
- Chongqing (episcopal see), a Latin Catholic metropolitan archdiocese in western China
- Chongqing Subdistrict, a subdistrict of Chaoyang District, Changchun, Jilin, China
- Chongzhou, formerly Chongqing County, in Chengdu, Sichuan, China
- Chungking Mansions, building in Kowloon, Hong Kong
- Chung King Road, pedestrian street in Los Angeles

== Other uses ==
- Chongqing dog, an old and rare breed of dog from China
- Chung King Studios, New York City recording studio
- Chungking bristle, alternative name for hog bristle artist's brushes
- HMS Aurora (12), a British cruiser renamed to Chonq Qing while under Chinese service

== See also ==
- Chunking (disambiguation), an unrelated english word which is a common misspelling of this name
- Chung Ching (disambiguation)
- Chungkingosaurus, dinosaur species first discovered in China
- Chun King, line of US marketed Chinese food products
- Chung Ching Wei (1914–1987) Chinese-born American businessman who created the Precision Club bidding system in contract bridge
