= Chink (disambiguation) =

"Chink" is an English-language ethnic slur usually referring to a person of Chinese descent.

Chink may also refer to:

== People ==
- Chink (nickname), various people
- Chink Martin (1886–1981), stage name of American jazz tuba player Martin Abraham
- Chink Santana (born 1972), stage name of American R&B musician and producer Andre Parker

== Other uses ==
- Chink (Isle of Wight), a scenic rock cleft on Isle of Wight
- A common name for the plant Bourreria baccata
- A colloquial term for the common pheasant in the United States
- "Chink", an episode of the 2010 British television drama Married Single Other
- Chinks, a half-length type of chaps, leather coverings for the legs
- Chink (geology)

== See also ==
- Chik (disambiguation)
- Chink in one's armor, a term for a vulnerability
- Chink-a-chink, a magic coin trick
- Chinka (disambiguation)
- Chinking, the process of filling gaps during construction of a log cabin
- Chinky, a Chinese take-away in parts of northern England
- Ching Chang Chong (disambiguation)
- Ching (disambiguation)
