= Bite, snack and meal =

Content writing and editing strategy

Bite, snack and meal is a content writing and editing strategy. First put forth by Leslie O'Flahavan in 1997 during her web writing courses, but popularized in the 2001 Inc. article she co-wrote under the E-Write LLC by-line with Marilynne Rudick, her former partner in the business.

A method of chunking content for the web, the bite, snack and meal approach entails writing for the appetite of a variety of web visitors. Some will nibble at content, some will spend more substantial time with it and others will dive right in to get the most possible out of the content.

== Key Concepts ==
- Bite - a headline with a message

"Wash a car without leaving streaks - research shows special technique works best"

When the option is available, the bite links to the content.

- Snack - a concise summary that provides enough information for a content overview

"Wash your car the right way and you'll avoid annoying streaks, while saving water. Research from the Car Washing Institute of America's new study shows that starting at the top washing your way down works best. Avoid streaks, reduce damage from grit and reduce water use by 50% when you start at the top."

The snack then links to the content.

- Meal - the full, original content

Example: a lengthy article on washing a car.
