= I Ching (disambiguation) =

I Ching or Yijing is a Chinese classic text.

I Ching may also refer to:

- I Ching (monk) (635–713), Tang Dynasty Buddhist monk
- I Ching (comics), fictional, blind martial artist published by DC Comics
- I Ching (band), band from London
- I Ching divination, cleromancy method using I Ching

== See also ==
- Yijing (disambiguation)
