= Ramón "Chunky" Sánchez =

Chicano musician and activist (1951–2016)

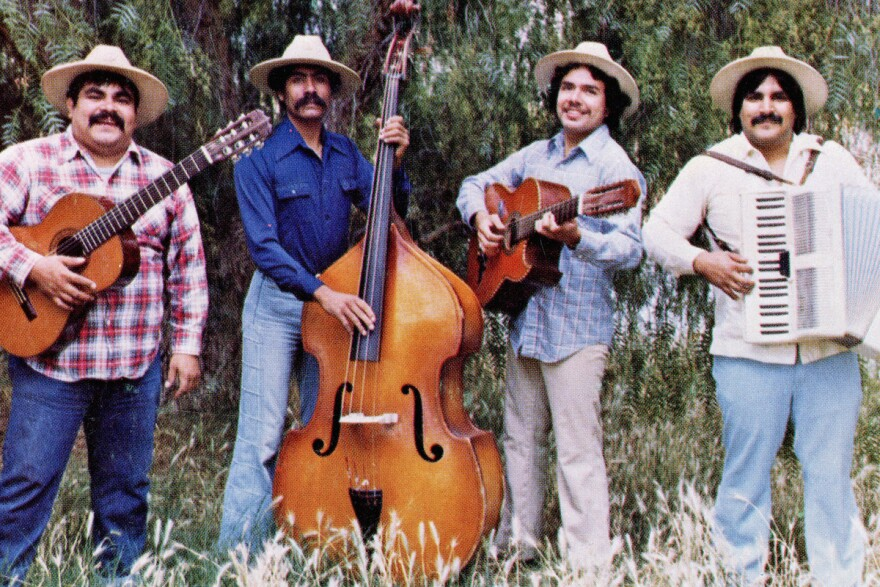
Los Alacranes Mojados by Memo Cevada, c. 1978. L–R: Ramón "Chunky" Sánchez, Marco Antonio Rodriguez, Mario Aguilar, and Ricardo Sánchez.

Ramón "Chunky" Moroyoqui Sánchez (October 30, 1951 — October 28, 2016) was a San Diego-based Chicano musician, folklorist, teacher, and activist. During the Chicano Movement, he formed Los Alacranes Mojados, performed and organized for the United Farm Workers, and was a founder of Chicano Park. Following its dissipation, he continued to perform, act on the Chicano Park Steering Committee, and advocate for Mexican-American youth.

== Biography ==
=== Early life and activist start ===
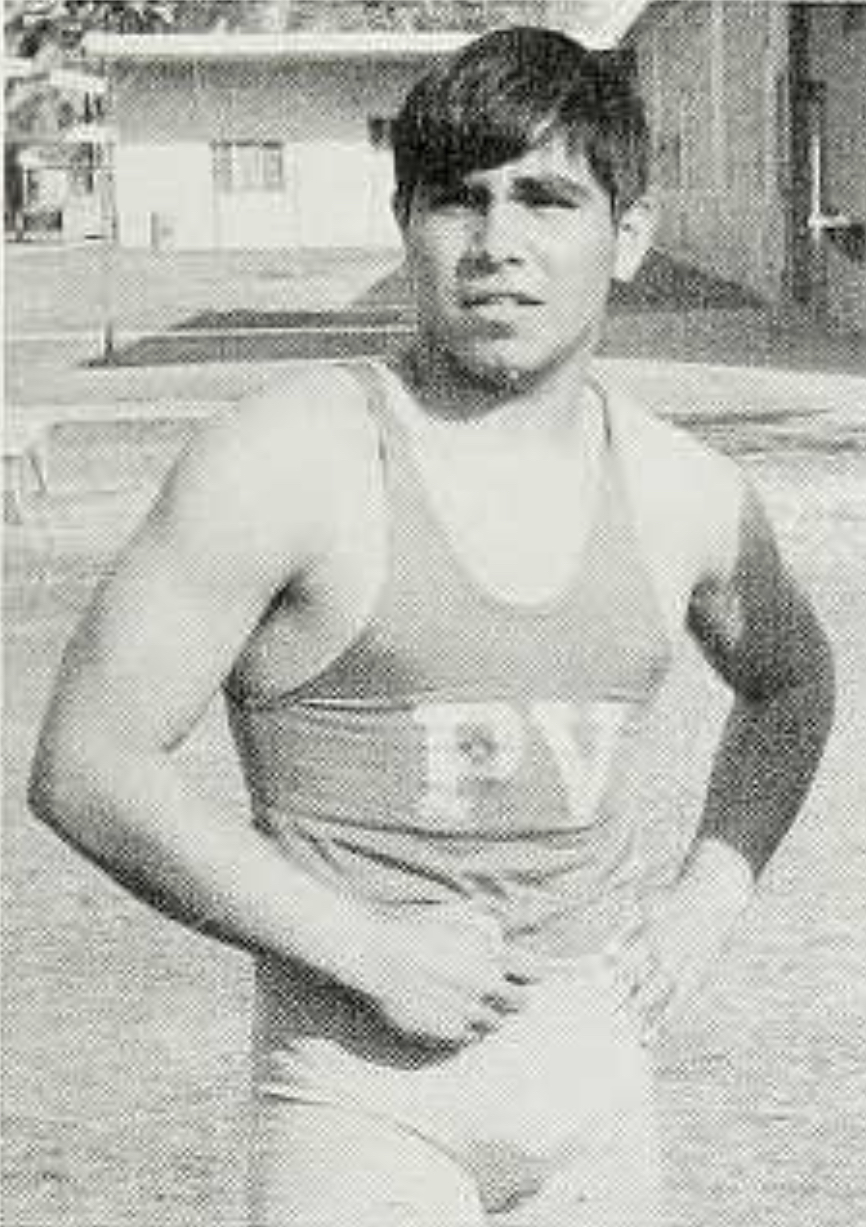
Sánchez in the 1968 Palo Verde High School yearbook

On October 30, 1951, Sánchez was born in Blythe, California to Mexican farmworkers Ramón Sánchez and Josefina Moroyoqui. His initial interest in music began when he attentively listened to his mother sing boleros. His uncle, José María "Chema", first taught him the guitar. In 1969, he graduated from Palo Verde High School, one year after his sister Virginia, and went to Palo Verde College for a semester before transferring to San Diego State University (SDSU), where he initially pursued physical education.

During the Chicano Movement, he was involved in the United Farm Workers struggle as an organizer and musician, having been repeatedly asked by César Chávez to perform. During this time, he was also a Mexican-American studies major at SDSU. There he was a central member of La Rondalla Amerindia de Aztlán, led by professor José Villarino. He also joined the Centro Cultural de la Raza-affiliate Teatro Mestizo, with which he was able to meet Agustín Lira, Daniel Valdez, Eduardo Robledo, Enrique Ramirez, and Fernando Leyva. In the 1970s, he formed the musical group Los Alacranes Mojados with his brother Ricardo, which in 1977 collaborated with Mexico City-based Los Mascarones through Leyva on Levántate Campesino (Rise up, Farmworker). Los Alacranes' recordings include Rolas de Aztlán, Picando, In Good Company, Rising Souls, and Veracruzano; Sánchez personally composed "Chicano Park Samba", "Trilingual Corrido", "Guitarra Campesina", and "Rising Souls". According to music scholar Russel C. Rodríguez, their influences included Mexican, Latin American, African-American, and labor music, forming a "polycultural" yet distinct barrio-style of music. Referring to "Pocho", Eduardo R. Muñoz-Muñoz compared the theme to Gloria Anzaldúa's concept of nepantla whilst Anita Casavantes Bradford and Alberto Eduardo Morales underscore its message of pride in diversity. However, they still performed traditional son jarocho, huapangos, boleros, rancheras, R&B, rock, and Latin dance music.

In March 1974, he married Isabel Enríquez at the Centro Cultural de la Raza in Balboa Park.

=== Chicano Park, youth advocacy, and legacy ===
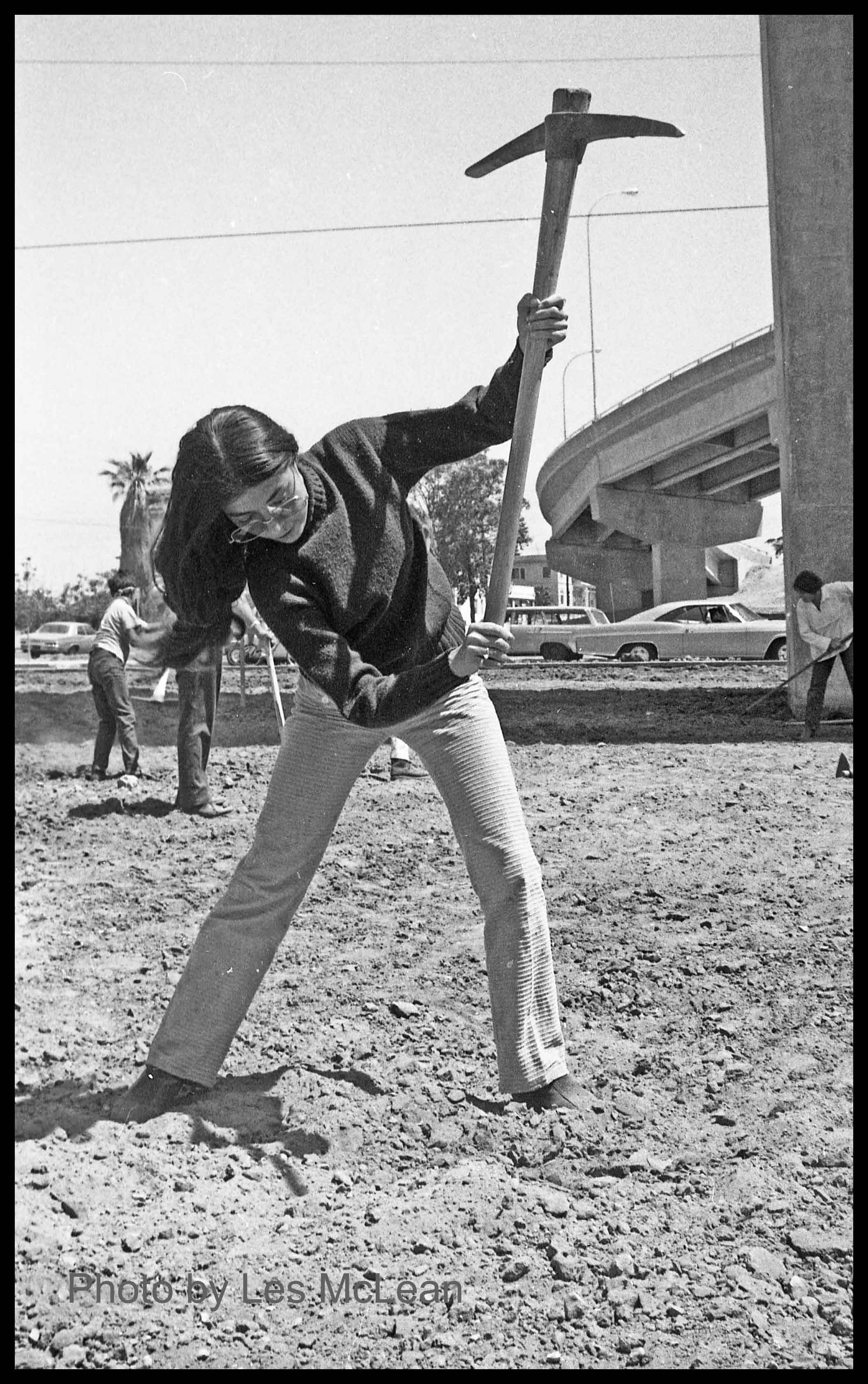
1970 photograph of a woman digging the land for Chicano Park, pictured by Les McLean and featured in The Street Journal. Sánchez also contributed to the project in this fashion.

Since the 12-day protest in 1970, he was one of the original advocates of Chicano Park in Barrio Logan, again contributing as an organizer and musician. After the land was secured, he served as the chair of the Chicano Park Steering Committee (CPSC) in the late 1980s and early 1990s. In the late 1970s, he composed the "Chicano Park Samba" in commemoration of the struggle. By 1981, he was director of the Palm City Youth Center, advocating greater education and resources to reduce youth gang membership. Despite him having mediated a truce between the Del Sol and San Ysidro gangs, the property leased for $1 from the city was considered for a housing project. He also directed the Street Youth Program, a $300,000 government initiative aimed at deterring juvenile gang membership and crime in southwest San Diego since 1982, but was demoted to a counselor once the city government deemed it ineffective in January 1987, officially being ended on January 30. Afterward, he was a coordinator at Barrio Station Youth Center. He also faced difficulty as a member of the CPSC when from 1983 to 1986 Alvin "Al" Ducheny fought for an additional 5.4 acres (2.2 ha) for Chicano Park. Chairman of the left-wing Harborview Community Council, founded in 1981, Ducheny, his wife Denise, and the organization's ~30 members contested for space as activists in Barrio Logan. In 1983, Ducheny disrupted the CPSC-government agreement to evenly split the 5.4 acres leased to Mauricio & Sons in January 1979 and to allocate $1.05 million to developing the CPSC's 2.7 acres (1.1 ha), causing the dispute that had been ongoing since 1974 to persist. Although the land was not granted, the San Diego Port voluntarily ceded a disconnected parcel on the coast in 1990, forming Chicanito Park. By March 1992, he was a San Diego Community College teacher.

In 2013, he was endowed with the National Heritage Fellowship and had a King-Chavez Academies auditorium built in his honor. Ill since at least 2014, he died on life support on October 28, 2016. At that point, his family included his wife Isabel Enríquez Sánchez, 6 children, one of whom died in 2010; 15 grandchildren, and one great-grandchild. By November 2, $4,400 was raised for funeral expenses. On November 5, hundreds attended a public mourning in Chicano Park. Additionally, community leaders like representative Juan Vargas, Director of the Southern Border Communities Coalition Christian Ramírez, and the San Diego Chargers released positive statements. In 2018, his life was covered in the documentary Singing Our Way to Freedom, produced by Paul Espinosa and narrated by Alma Martinez. That year, he was also featured in a new mural at Chicano Park with Our Lady of Guadalupe as the central figure; Sánchez was positioned to her right next to Dolores Huerta and Border Angels.

== See also ==
- Herman Baca
- Américo Paredes

== Sources ==
=== Bibliography ===
- Pich, Tom; Bergey, Barry (2018). Folk Masters: A Portrait of America. Indiana University Press. doi:10.2307/j.ctt2005skr. ISBN 978-0-253-03232-4. OCLC 1004576261. Project MUSE book 56018.
- Rodríguez, Russell C. (May 19, 2017). "Ramón "Chunky" Sánchez—¡PRESENTE!". Kalfou: a Journal of Comparative and Relational Ethnic Studies. 4 (1). Temple University Press: 118–122. doi:10.15367/kf.v4i1.148. ISSN 2372-0751. ProQuest 2017375618.
