= Chink (nickname) =

Chink was the nickname of some athletes or military figures, predominantly American in the early 20th century. It is often adjudged to be a reference to someone's appearance. The nickname is an ethnic slur originally referring to a person of Chinese descent. However, not all uses of the nickname were derived in that manner: basketball player Chink Crossin received the nickname as an onomatopoeia for the sound that chain basketball nets (sometimes used on outdoor basketball courts) make when a shot goes through (similar to the term "swish" used for cloth nets), and British Army officer Eric Dorman-Smith was given the nickname due to his resemblance to a Chinkara antelope. Notable persons with the nickname include:

- Chink Alterman (1922–2009), American professional basketball player
- Chink Crossin (1923–1981), American professional basketball player
- Eric Dorman-Smith (1895–1969), Irish officer in the British Army and the Irish Republican Army
- John Heileman (1872–1940), American Major League Baseball player in 1901
- Bankson T. Holcomb Jr. (1908–2000), United States Marine Corps brigadier general
- William O. Lowe (1894–1949), American college football player, lawyer, and Republican political figure in Tennessee
- Chink Outen (1905–1961), American Major League Baseball player in 1933
- Chink Taylor (1898–1980), American Major League Baseball player in 1925
- Albert Zachary (1914–2006), American Major League Baseball pitcher in 1944

== See also ==
- Chink Martin (1886–1981), stage name of American jazz tuba player Martin Abraham
- Chink Santana (born 1972), stage name of American R&B musician and producer Andre Parker
- Chinki Yadav (born 1997), Indian sport shooter
- Chink (disambiguation)
