= Albert Zachary =

American baseball pitcher (1914-2006)

- Pitcher
- Born: Albert Myron Zarski; May 14, 1914; Brooklyn, New York, U.S.
- Died: June 24, 2006 (aged 92); Rome, New York, U.S.
- Batted: Right Threw: Right

MLB debut
- April 30, 1944, for the Brooklyn Dodgers

Last MLB appearance
- September 28, 1944, for the Brooklyn Dodgers

MLB statistics
- Win–loss record: 0–2
- Earned run average: 9.58
- Strikeouts: 3
- Stats at Baseball Reference

Teams
- Brooklyn Dodgers (1944)

Albert Myron "Chink" Zachary (born Albert Myron Zarski; May 14, 1914 – June 24, 2006) was an American professional baseball pitcher. He played in four games (two of them starts) in Major League Baseball for the Brooklyn Dodgers during the 1944 season. He played in parts of 10 minor league seasons between 1936 and 1951, including at the Triple-A level in 1948 and 1951.

Zachary was born in Brooklyn, New York, and died in Rome, New York. He was sometimes referred to by the nickname "Chink", and has been listed under that name by some baseball reference sites.
