= San Diego Police Department =

Law enforcement agency serving San Diego, California

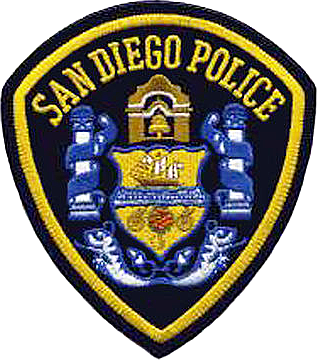
- Introduced in 1988, these patches were originally brown to match the tan uniforms of the time, before being changed to blue in 1998.

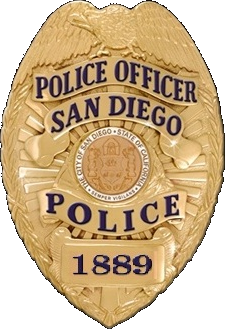
- SDPD officer badge, issued since 1974 based on a 1930 design.
- Abbreviation: SDPD
- Motto: America's Finest

Agency overview
- Formed: May 16, 1889; 137 years ago
- Employees: 2,332 (2020)
- Annual budget: $660 million (2024)

Jurisdictional structure
- Operations jurisdiction: San Diego, California, United States
- Area: 372.4 square miles (965 km^{2})
- Population: 1,425,999 (2018)
- General nature: Local civilian police

Operational structure
- Headquarters: 1401 Broadway; San Diego, California 92101
- Police officers: 1,873 (2025)
- Unsworn members: 601 (2020)
- Mayor of San Diego responsible: Todd Gloria
- Agency executive: Scott Wahl, Chief of Police
- Divisions: List: Central; Eastern; Mid-City; Neighborhood Policing; Northern; Northeastern; Northwestern; Southern; Southeastern; Western

Facilities
- Stations: 11

Website
- sandiego.gov/police

The San Diego Police Department (SDPD) is the primary law enforcement agency of San Diego, California. Established on May 16, 1889. It is the second-largest municipal police department in California, after the Los Angeles Police Department.

== History ==
Prior to the establishment of the San Diego Police Department, law enforcement services were provided by the San Diego City Marshal beginning in 1850. The first City Marshal, Agoston Haraszthy, was Sheriff at the same time. He appointed Richard Freeman a marshal, making Freeman the first African American lawman in California. In 1852, due to lack of willing individuals to take up the position, the City Marshal disbanded.

In 1885 the office of City Marshal was reestablished, and in 1889, with a new city charter, the police department was established. All but one police officer at the time of the establishment were White, except for one Hispanic sergeant. The sixth police chief, Edward “Ned” Bushyhead, also co-founded the San Diego Union, a predecessor to the San Diego Union-Tribune.

In 1939, the department moved into their headquarters on Harbor Drive, which they used until moving to 1401 Broadway in 1986; in 1998 the former headquarters was placed onto the National Register of Historic Places. During World War II, one third of the department was drafted into the United States Military. In 1973, the first uniformed female officer joined the department.

During the 1980s, the police department was at the center of a case that came before the Supreme Court of the United States and Ninth Circuit, Kolender v. Lawson, 461 U.S. 352 (1983), which held unconstitutional laws that allow police to demand that "loiterers" and "wanderers" provide identification; this continues to affect other departments nationwide. The decade also saw officers responding to the San Ysidro McDonald's massacre; it was also a decade where the department had the highest mortality rate for officers of any major American city.

In 2016, the San Diego City Council spent $30.3 million on a "Smart Streetlights" program that put 3000 microphones and cameras in public areas around the city to help the department monitor traffic and solve crimes. Mayor Kevin Faulconer turned the technology off in 2019 following an outcry from local activists. In 2022, a "TRUST Ordinance" was passed that established a "Privacy Advisory Board" for citizen oversight of surveillance technology contracts in the city.

In June 2024, incoming chief Scott Wahl overhauled the structure of the organization's leadership model, demoting four assistant chief positions and hiring a civilian assistant director in charge of finance. As of 2022, 700 officers had less than five years experience.

In November 2025, response times were 22 minutes longer than target for Priority One Calls (child abuse, bomb threats, domestic violence and reports of missing children). A spokesman for the San Diego Police Officer Association blamed it on "limited resources" and short staffing. In May 2025, five detective jobs and overtime were cut by mayor Todd Gloria. Since 2006, police calls had jumped by a third while officer numbers had dropped. The ratio of officer per 1000 residents was 1.3, while the national average was 2.4 per 1000.

In January 2026, the SDPD announced that its "Real-Time Operations Center" technology hub had been opened in June 2025, but the "ribbon cutting" had been delayed pending a contentious vote to continue funding Automated License Plate Recognition was approved by the City Council in December.

=== Misconduct ===
On March 12, 1987, a team from the SDPD raided the home of Tommie DuBose, a civil servant working for the U.S. Navy. They were attempting to serve a warrant on his son, Charles. They apparently knocked on the door, then broke it down before anyone inside could open it. After a struggle, Officer Carlos Garcia shot DuBose five times, including four in the back, and he died immediately. An investigation concluded that the uniforms worn did not allow the policemen to be easily identified as law enforcement and that the team did not allow enough time for the family to open the door. The investigation recommended no action be taken against any of the officers. They all returned to duty.

In February 2011, Sergeant Ken Davis was charged with one count of felony stalking and three counts of repeated harassment by phone or electronic contact relating to his conduct towards another police officer. Davis pleaded not guilty and was put on paid administrative duty while on trial. He later pleaded guilty in exchange for a sentence of three years of probation and ten days of community service.

On March 11, 2011, San Diego policeman Anthony Arevalos was arrested on 18 charges related to traffic stops he conducted between 2009 and 2011. He was accused of sexual assault in one instance and for asking women for their underwear in exchange for not being cited. In November, a jury found him guilty of several charges, including felony charges of sexual battery by restraint and assault and battery by an officer. Lawsuits against the city resulted in agreements to pay more than $2 million relating to Arevalos' crimes.

In 2011, Motorcycle Officer Christopher Hall, suspected of DUI after hitting a car and fleeing the scene in Costa Mesa, committed suicide by shooting himself in the head.

In July 2012, Officer Daniel Dana pleaded no contest to committing a lewd act in public, a misdemeanor charge, in exchange with having the felony charge of sexually assaulting a prostitute dropped. It stemmed from a May 2011 event in which Dana coerced a prostitute to have sex with him in his patrol car. Dana left the police force following the charge.

In November 2014, two married SDPD officers, Bryce and Jennifer Charpentier, were arrested for burglarizing homes in the San Diego area. They were trying to steal prescription painkillers to feed their drug addiction. They were both subsequently terminated from SDPD, and sentenced to three years in prison.

On March 15, 2015, at 5:00 a.m., SDPD officers responded to a domestic disturbance call, waking resident Ian Anderson and his six-year-old pit bull service dog, Burberry. Anderson opened the door and informed the officers that they had the wrong address. Video surveillance showed Burberry running up to one of the officers who "put his hand out in an attempt to calm the dog," Burberry then ran towards a second officer who can be seen, in a neighborhood surveillance video, to be retreating. The officer then drew his gun and shot and killed the dog.

On March 17, 2015, a U-T San Diego watchdog reported: "A San Diego Police Department dispatcher and anonymous Wikipedia users have edited or deleted paragraphs from the misconduct section of the police department's Wikipedia page five times since January 2014. ... The edits, which eliminated references to negative information, came as the police force faced several scandals over officer misconduct."

Also on March 17, 2015, a U.S. Department of Justice review recommended that the SDPD overhaul its supervision practices following misconduct in which officers took advantage of women sexually.

In January 2020, Detective Michael Lambert lied to a judge to get a search warrant in a homicide case. The investigation led to the suicide of the suspect and in 2021, a six-million dollar ruling against the department. Lambert later retired.

On January 28, 2025, Officer Daniel Gold shot and killed 16-year-old Konoa Wilson as he exited a train station. Wilson was fleeing another person who had just shot at him when Gold shot him in the back. Gold did not identify himself until after the shooting. Wilson had a gun on his person, but there was no evidence he attempted to use it. In December 2025, the city of San Diego reached a $30 million settlement with Wilson's family, which is believed to be the largest settlement for a police killing in U.S. history.

==== Commission on Police Practices ====
In 2020, a city ballot measure established the "San Diego Commission on Police Practices" (CPP) to improve citizen oversight and subpoena power over the department. The city council did not appoint any commissioners until 2023. Operating procedures were not established until early 2025. As of July 2025, the commission had no power to investigate complaints due to the state-mandated "meet and confer" rules that require them to negotiate with the police union first. Prior to 2020, citizen oversight was executed by the County's "Citizens Law Enforcement Review Board."

In August 2025, the SDPD agreed to 11 recommendations set forth by CPP to improve transparency. As of April 2026, several of the agreed upon notification memos were not sent to the complainant or to the CPP.

== Rank structure ==
| Title | Insignia | Insignia located | Ref |
|---|---|---|---|
| Chief | | Uniform collar | |
| Deputy Chief | | Uniform collar | |
| Assistant Chief | | Uniform collar | |
| Commander | | Uniform collar | |
| Captain | | Uniform collar | |
| Lieutenant | | Uniform collar | |
| Sergeant | | Sleeve | |
| Detective | | Non-uniformed | |
| Police officer III | | Sleeve | |
| Police officer II | | No insignia | |
| Police officer I | | No insignia | |
| Police recruit | | No insignia | |

== Gallery ==
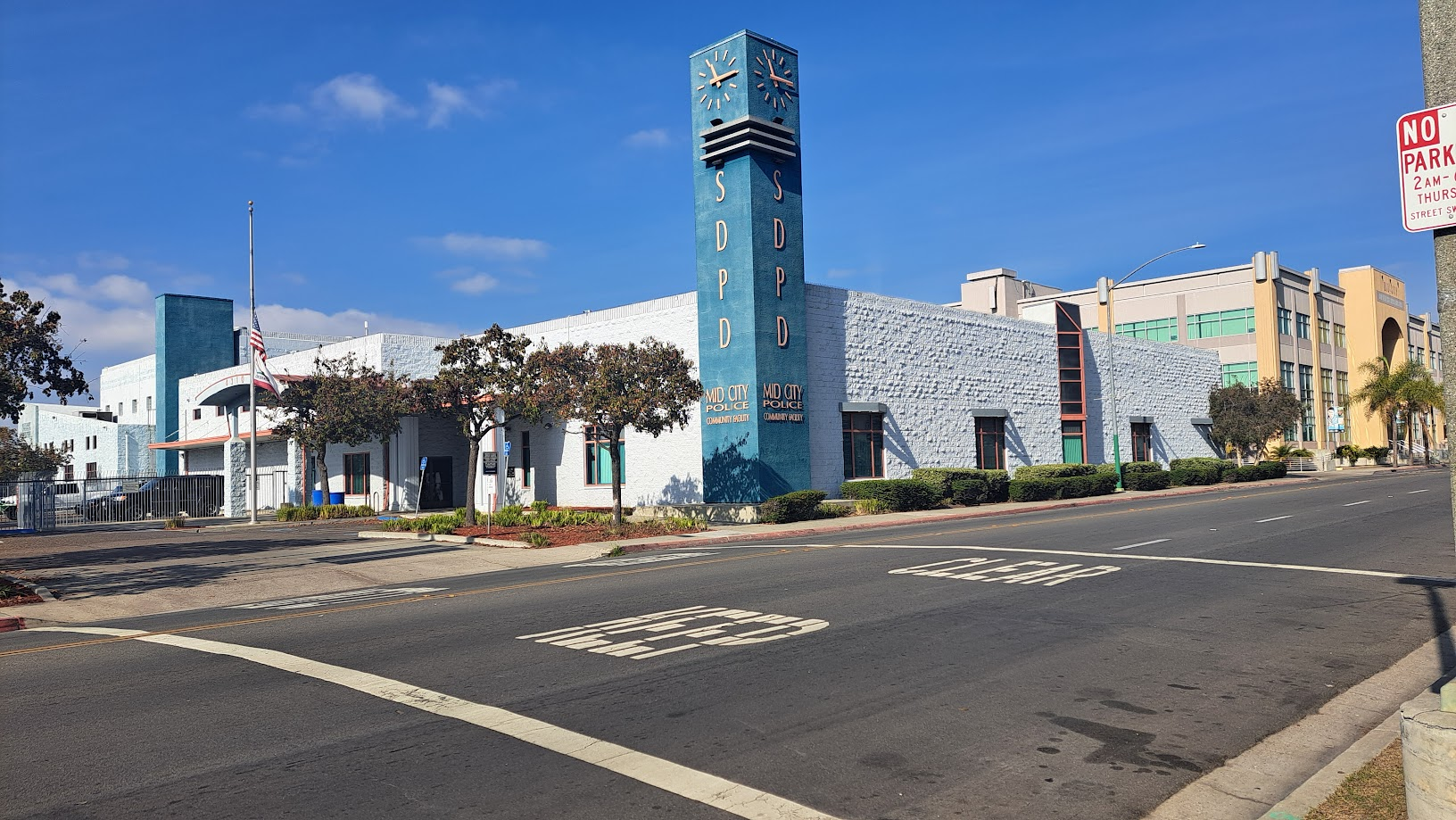
Mid-City Substation in City Heights

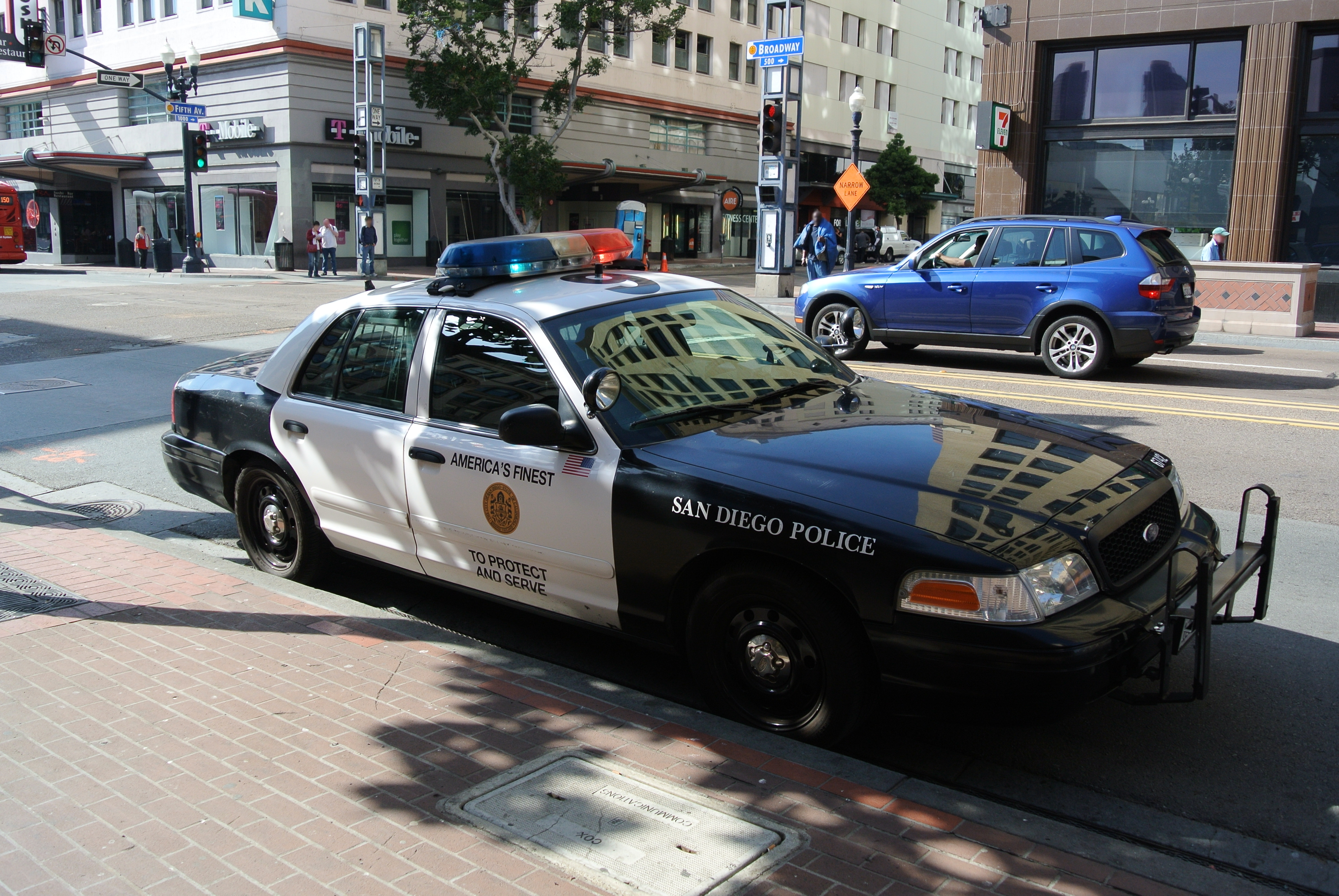
San Diego Police car in the city center

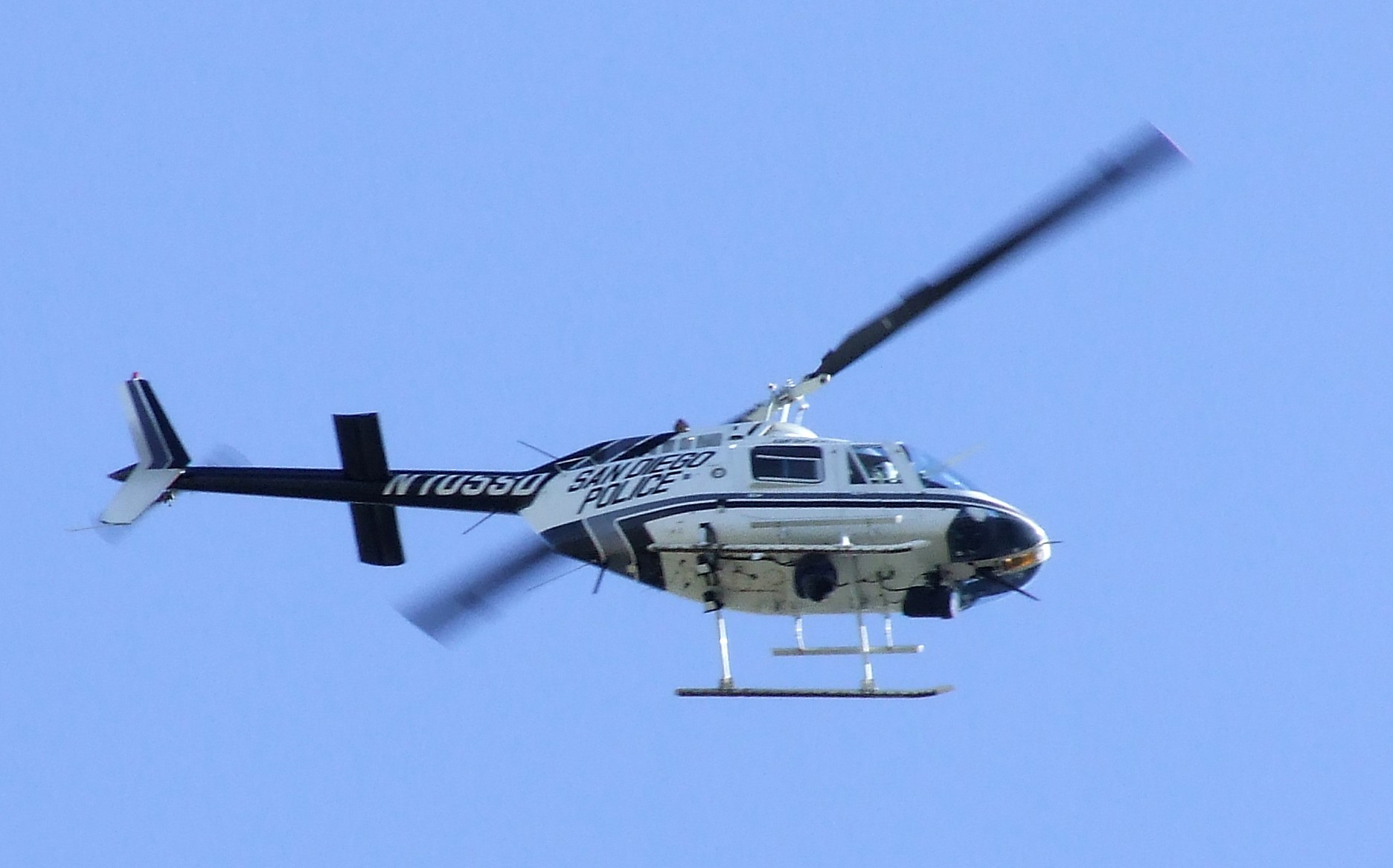
San Diego Police ABLE helicopter

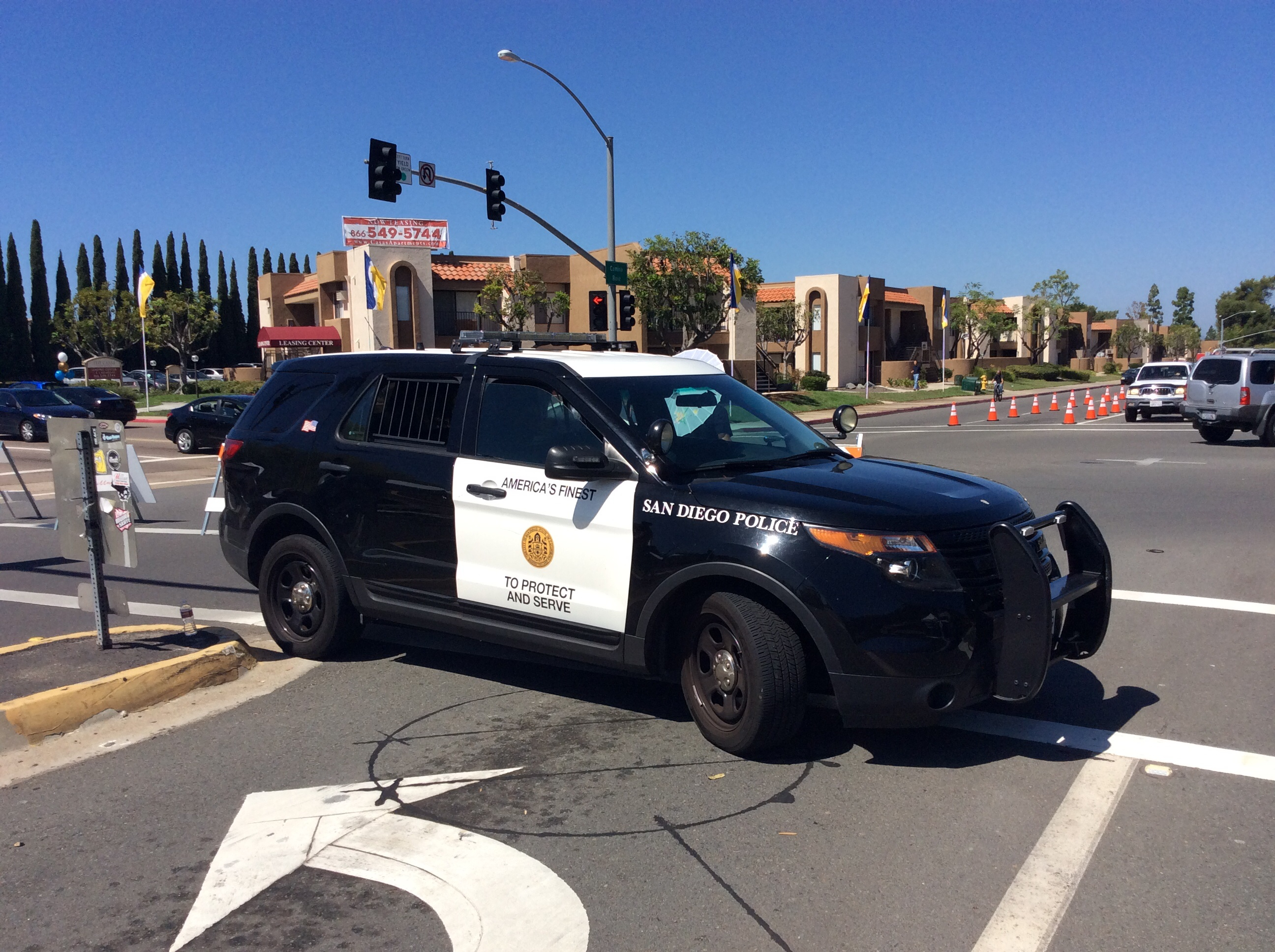
San Diego Police SUV in Mira Mesa

| SDPD patch | Ref |
| used from 1988 to 1998 | |
| used from 1998 to now | |

== Line of duty deaths ==
As of January 2025, 37 officers have died in the line of duty since the department's establishment.

== See also ==
- Crime in San Diego
- Fictional portrayals of the San Diego Police Department
- List of law enforcement agencies in California
