= Chunking =

Chunking may mean:

- Chunking (division), an approach for doing simple mathematical division sums, by repeated subtraction
- Chunking (computational linguistics), a method for parsing natural language sentences into partial syntactic structures
- Chunking (computing), a memory allocation or message transmission procedure or data splitting procedure in computer programming
- Chunking (music), a rhythm guitar and mandolin technique
- Chunking (psychology), a short-term memory mechanism and techniques to exploit it
- Chunking (writing), a method of splitting content into short, easily scannable elements, especially for web audiences
- CHUNKING, an extension method of the Simple Mail Transfer Protocol for delivering electronic mail in computer networking
- Pumpkin chunking, the activity of hurling pumpkins

== See also ==
- Chongqing (disambiguation), which includes its variants Chungking and Chung King, both common variant spellings of this word
- Chun King
