= Chink Taylor =

American baseball player (1898–1980)

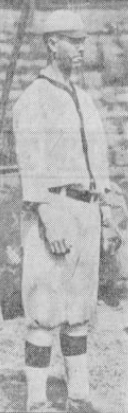
- Taylor in 1921
- Outfielder
- Born: February 9, 1898; Burnet, Texas, U.S.
- Died: July 7, 1980 (aged 82); Temple, Texas, U.S.
- Batted: Right Threw: Right

MLB debut
- April 18, 1925, for the Chicago Cubs

Last MLB appearance
- May 20, 1925, for the Chicago Cubs

MLB statistics
- Games played: 8
- Batting average: .000 (0-for-6)
- Runs scored: 2
- Stats at Baseball Reference

Teams
- Chicago Cubs (1925)

C. L. "Chink" Taylor (February 9, 1898 – July 7, 1980) was an American professional baseball outfielder during the 1920s. He played in eight games for the Chicago Cubs of Major League Baseball in 1925.

Taylor played in the minor leagues from 1921 to 1929 (except for 1923), appearing in 1109 games while compiling a .307 batting average. Per Taylor's draft registration cards of September 1918 and February 1942, his given name was "C. L." (initials only). He was one of several baseball players in the first half of the 20th century with the nickname "Chink".

Taylor died in July 1980 at the age of 82; he was survived by his wife and two sons.
