= Ching Chang Chong (disambiguation) =

Ching chang chong is a pejorative term mocking the Chinese language.

Ching Chang Chong may also refer to:

- "Ching Chang Chong", a 2009 song by the band Cherona from their album Sound of Cherona
- "Ching Chang Chong", a 2009 song by the parodist Rucka Rucka Ali and his alias DJ Not Nice

== See also ==
- "Ching Chong Chang", an episode from season three of Orange Is the New Black
- Zhing-zhong, a Zimbabwean slang word for Chinese products of poor quality
- Chink (disambiguation)
