= Chung Ching (disambiguation) =

Chung Ching (born 1933) is a Chinese painter and former actress.

Chung Ching may also refer to:

- Chung Ching Yee, a now defunct Chinese-American youth gang
- Chung Ching Middle School, Seria
- A variation of ching chong, a racial slur used primarily to mock the Chinese language.

== See also ==
- Chongqing (disambiguation)
- Ching (disambiguation)
