= I Ching (band) =

British synth pop band

I Ching were a four-piece band from London, formed in 2010. The band consisted of Kevin Emre, Rollo Smallcombe, Andrew Ford and Triple J Jones.

I Ching's music has been described as having an 80's sound, although the band often cite their influences as more psychedelic and electronic-based. Their music has been heavily praised by Lauren Laverne and has been described as the changing sound of electro indie.

They released their first single, 'It's Me,' on Best Fit Recordings on 23 April 2012.

== Discography ==
Singles

"It's Me" / "Drive" - 23 April 2012
