= Chunks (film) =

- Directed by: Amber A'Lee Frost (segment: "Chunks host segments"); Pierce Campion (segment: "You Should Feel Better"); Saul Crinier (segment: "Charming Bears"); Cameron Fetter & Caleb Pitts (segment: "The Eater"); Nate Fisher (segment: "Poker Night at the Pleasure Trove"); Sandy Honig (segment: "Utopia Air"); Jim Soper (segment: "Office of Tomorrow")
- Written by: Amber A'Lee Frost & Ruby McCollister (segment: "Chunks host segments"); Michael Cavadias (segment: "You Should Feel Better"); Nick Mullen (segment: "Charming Bears"); Patrick Doran & Cameron Fetter & Caleb Pitts (segment: "The Eater"); Nate Fisher & Will Sennett (segment: "Poker Night at Pleasure Trove"); Sandy Honig (segment: "Utopia Air"); Josh Androsky & Charles Austin & Alex Branson & Andrew Hudson (segment: "Office of Tomorrow")
- Produced by: Josh Androsky; Joshua Cohen
- Production company: ColdFeet Films
- Distributed by: Patreon
- Release date: July 19, 2026
- Running time: 80 minutes
- Country: United States
- Language: English

Chunks is a 2026 American independent comedy anthology film produced by ColdFeet Films and distributed by Patreon. It was executive produced by Chapo Trap House creators Amber A'Lee Frost (who also directed and co-wrote the linking host sections), Will Menaker, Felix Biederman, and Matt Christman. Shorts were contributed by comedians including former Cum Town host Nick Mullen and Three Busy Debras co-creator Sandy Honig.

== Summary ==
At the KSAD TV network, a failed Hollywood starlet named Ruby (Ruby McCollister) goes through vocal preparations ahead of the filming of an anthology TV show, Chunks. The crew, tired of working with her and knowing she will be cranky, leave the set in the hands of the interns so they don't have to deal with her. The starlet, amid interjections and malicious editing by the interns, then introduces six short films:

=== Office of Tomorrow ===
An animated infomercial for an automated "office of tomorrow" in which menial white collar workers are trapped in grim, automated cycles of work and sleep before being burned for fuel.

=== Utopia Air ===
A Flight Attendant (Sandy Honig) goes through a series of increasingly bizarre guidelines for the airline Utopia Air. Eventually, it is revealed that the passengers on the plane are all dead, and being returned to Earth via reincarnation for a particular purpose.

=== Poker Night at the Pleasure Grove ===
On his livestreamed show, wealthy influencer JGB (Will Sennett) invites people to play poker in his basement/casino. This week's contestants are crypto-shilling Fantassy, rapper Scary the Dangerous, poker titan Bob Mubb, chess master Nadya Meyrika, and math teacher and competition winner Jeff Sexberry.

=== Charming Bears ===
In an animated parody of the Charmin bears advertisements, a toilet paper-hawking ursid discovers that he has colorectal cancer.

=== The Eater ===
Douglas (Patrick Doran) has his life thrown into chaos when he wakes up to find a massive chunk taken out of his beloved table. As his possessions are devoured night after night, he goes to extreme measures to stop the destruction – and avenge his beloved furniture.

=== You Should Feel Better ===
An attempt to promote a 500-million-year-old alien wise woman (Michael Cavendias) on YouTube leads to friction between enlightenment-seeking Claire (Emily Allan) and viewer-chasing Genesis (Leah Hennessy).

== Cast ==
=== Chunks host segments ===
- Ruby McCollister as Ruby
- Amber A'Lee Frost as Amber
- Josh Androsky as Josh
- Carson Lund and Michael Basta as "The Interns"

=== Office of Tomorrow ===
- Ike Barinholtz as "The Narrator"
- Charles Austin, Alex Branson & Andrew Hudson as additional voices

=== Utopia Air ===
- Sandy Honig as Flight Attendant
- E.J. Marcus as The Freak
- Nick Naney as Nick
- Rachel Lumayno as Susan
- Rhoda Pell as Wife
- William Jones as Husband
- Josh Androsky as Last Passenger
- Carmen Abeyta, Mama Char, Shane Essary, Bill Glasser & Robert Rexx as Passengers

=== Charming Bears ===
- Nick Mullen as Bernie/Don

=== Poker Night at the Pleasure Trove ===
- Will Sennett as Jeff Gordon Bezos
- Nate Fisher as Domagoj 'Fantessy' Grubišić
- Eli Lutsky as Jeff Sexberry
- Terence Pennington as Scary the Dangerous
- Brian Fitzgerald as Bob Mubb
- Meredith Starkman as Nadya Meyrika
- Dylan Subiza as Masseuse
- Bobby Bauman as Dealer

=== The Eater ===
- Patrick Doran as Douglas
- Brian Fiddyment as The Eater
- Lauren Servideo as Samantha
- Caleb Pitts as Bob
- Cameron Fetter as Exterminator

=== You Should Feel Better ===
- Emily Allan as Claire
- Jawnee Conroy as Victor
- Michael Cavadias as Claywoman/Lyle
- Leah Hennessy as Genesis
- Kellian Delice as Palindrome
- Jemima Kirke as Eric

== Production ==
The genesis for Chunks came in 2020, when Chapo Trap House host Amber A'Lee Frost decided to move from New York City, where the podcast had been running since its inception in 2016, to Los Angeles. She pitched to the Chapo crew the idea of an anthology film that could draw on their contacts in comedy and other creative fields for contributors. However, work on the film was slow; as Frost told Rolling Stone: "Every meeting we had with higher-ups, they're like, ‘That's amazing. We love it. Write it and make it, and then we'll take 10 percent.'" The film was eventually produced and with the aid of crowdfunding website Patreon, which Chapo Trap House uses to fund its programming.

Chunks became part of a brace of films produced or co-produced by the new Chapo production house, ColdFeet Films, including Eephus, which was released two years prior.

Part of the intent of Chunks was to provide the creators with a jumping-off point for more work, encouraging segments that could stand on their own and potentially become stand-alone projects. "We approached it like, 'Make something that could theoretically be a pilot, and you own it,'" Frost told Rolling Stone. "We basically have broadcast rights, and if it gets developed into a show, we get our nickel. So we're a micro Patreon – except we give people startup money."

== Release and reception ==
Chunks premiered as a digital stream on Patreon on July 19, 2026. It has also been screened at independent cinemas such as Charlottesville's Tivoli and at the Alamo Drafthouse in Chicago.

=== Critical response ===
In an article for Jacobin, Michael G. Vann called the film "a hilarious and unsettling ninety-minute journey into the darkness of the American soul" that "finds morbid humor in how America has transformed risk into leisure because it has already transformed ordinary life into risk".
