= Killing of Konoa Wilson =

2025 police killing in San Diego, California, US

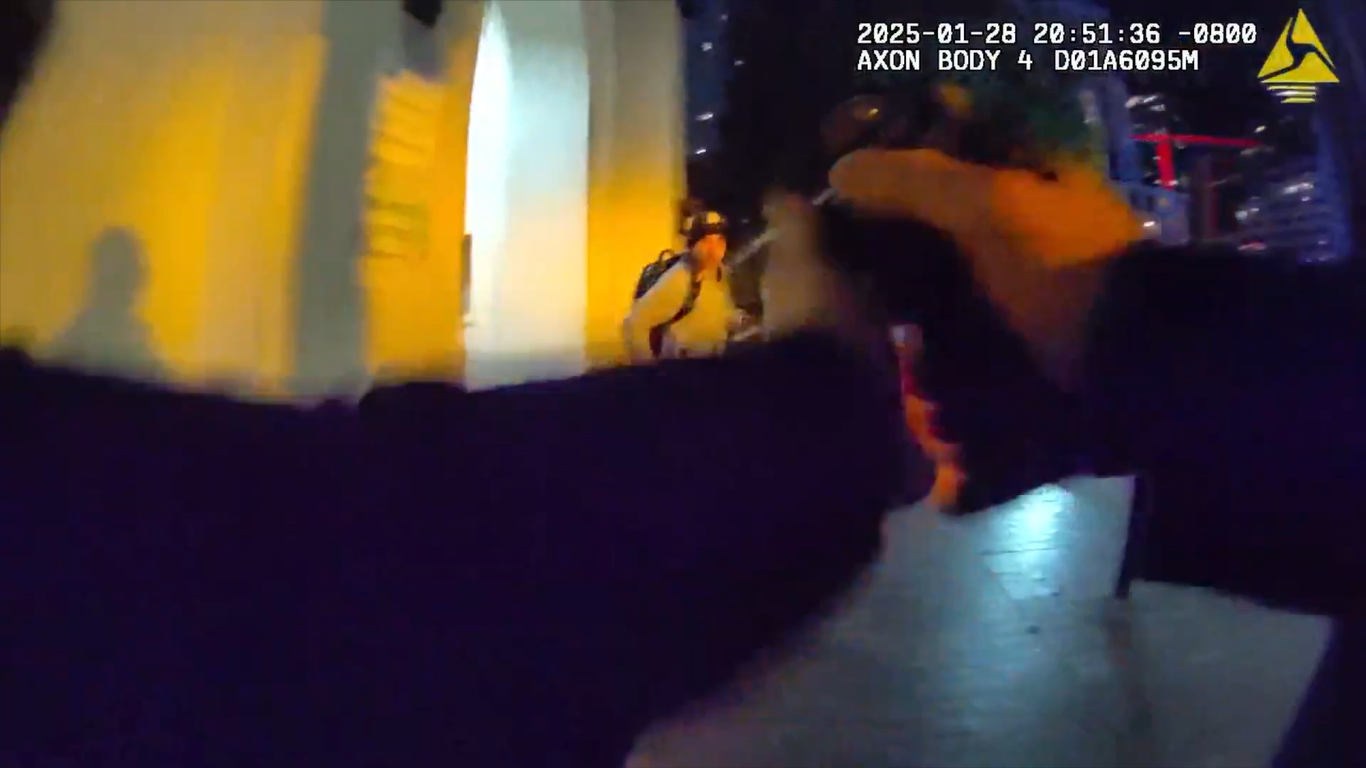
- Frame from Gold's body camera, showing him aiming his gun at Wilson
- Date: January 28, 2025; 19 months ago
- Time: 8:51 p.m. (PST; UTC-08:00)
- Location: San Diego, California, US; 32.7167°N 117.1693°W
- Type: Shooting by law enforcement
- Participants: Daniel Gold
- Deaths: 1 (Konoa Wilson)
- Litigation: Civil lawsuit resulting in a $30 million settlement

On January 28, 2025, Konoa Wilson, a 16-year-old African-American teenager, was shot and killed by Daniel Gold, a San Diego Police Department (SDPD) officer at a train station in the downtown area of San Diego, California, United States. Wilson was running away from another person who was shooting at him when Gold, who was in the area on an unrelated call and overheard the gunfire, encountered Wilson and shot him in the back as he was running.

On December 9, 2025, the San Diego attorney's office awarded the family of Wilson US$30 million after a wrongful death lawsuit was brought by his parents; considered the largest settlement in a police killing case in US history, it surpassed the $27 million the Minneapolis City Council awarded the family of George Floyd in March 2021 after his murder.

== People involved ==
=== Konoa Wilson ===
Konoa Steven Wilson (2008 – January 28, 2025) was an African American teenager and only child, living in the San Diego area. He attended Bayside Community School in Logan Heights. Wilson had been a target of gang members in the area, and carried a gun for self-defense, which was found on him during the shooting. He was three months away from his 17th birthday at the time of his death.

=== Daniel Gold ===
Daniel Gold II was a police officer for the San Diego Police Department, and was a member of the department for two years at the time of the shooting.

== Incident ==
=== Prior confrontation ===
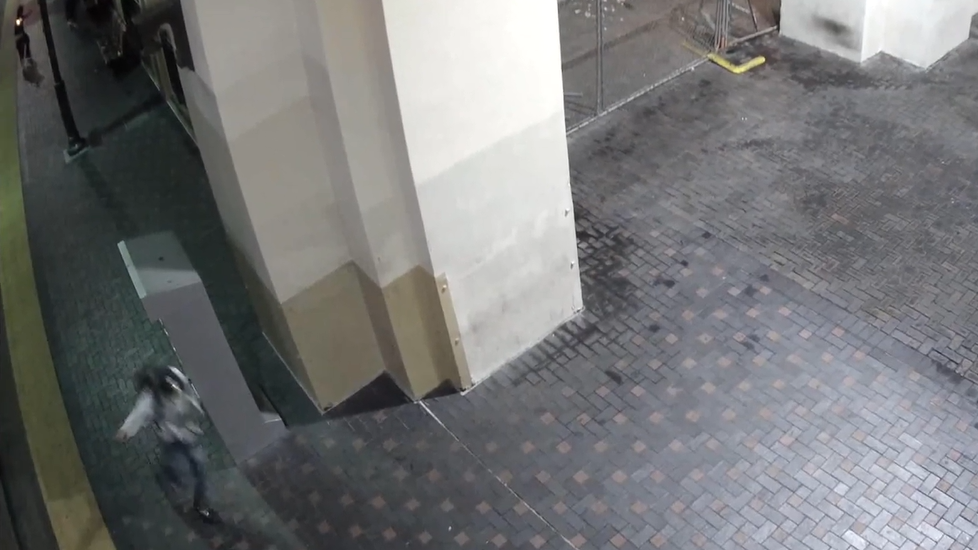
Wilson (bottom left) running away from gunfire (top left), Officer Gold would encounter him at the end of the corridor

At 8:50 p.m., Wilson was walking with another person down a corridor from Kettner Boulevard, toward two other individuals on a train platform on the west side of the Santa Fe Depot. The person Wilson was with crossed the tracks onto the opposite side of the platform, leaving Wilson with the two other people already at the platform. One minute later, after a confrontation with Wilson, one of the individuals pulled out a gun and fired multiple shots at Wilson before running away, with Wilson running in the opposite direction, through the corridor he previously entered in and toward where San Diego police officer Daniel Gold was on Kettner Boulevard.

=== Gold shoots Wilson ===
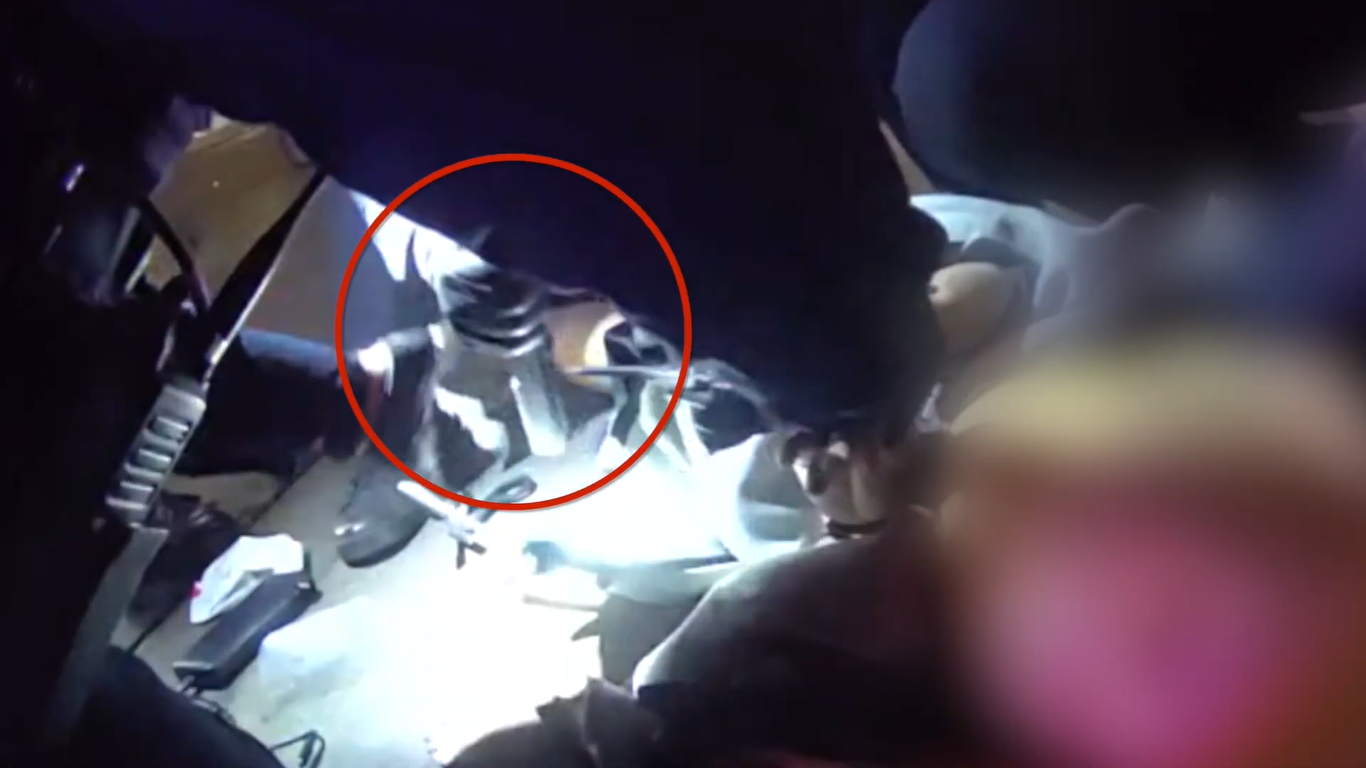
Wilson's handgun (circled) is recovered while he receives medical treatment

Gold was already at Kettner Boulevard with another officer, responding to an earlier report of a man being assaulted at the America Plaza station on West Broadway, a street adjacent to the train station. Gold ran toward the same corridor Wilson was running through with his gun drawn after him and another officer reported hearing the gunfire; Gold's uniform-worn camera was also activated. Wilson emerged from the corridor and ran directly in front of Gold, causing Gold to yell "Woah." Gold immediately fired two shots at Wilson, shooting him in the back at close range; the time between Wilson running in front of Gold and Gold shooting him was less than three seconds. After Wilson screamed and collapsed behind a police SUV, Gold identified himself as San Diego Police. Officers began providing medical aid to Wilson, and in doing so, found a handgun that was concealed underneath his clothing. Wilson was not holding his handgun when Gold shot him. Wilson was taken to UC San Diego Health Medical Center, where he was pronounced dead one hour after being shot.

== Aftermath and initial investigation ==
On February 6, SDPD arrested a 16-year-old suspect, in connection with the initial gunfire that led to Gold shooting Wilson; their name was withheld from the public.

Body camera footage of the incident was released on February 21 by the SDPD. On that same day, a vigil was held for Wilson in downtown San Diego, and a GoFundMe was created for his family. In December, the community raised concerns about Gold's continued role with the SDPD and called for accountability within the department.

=== Initial investigation ===
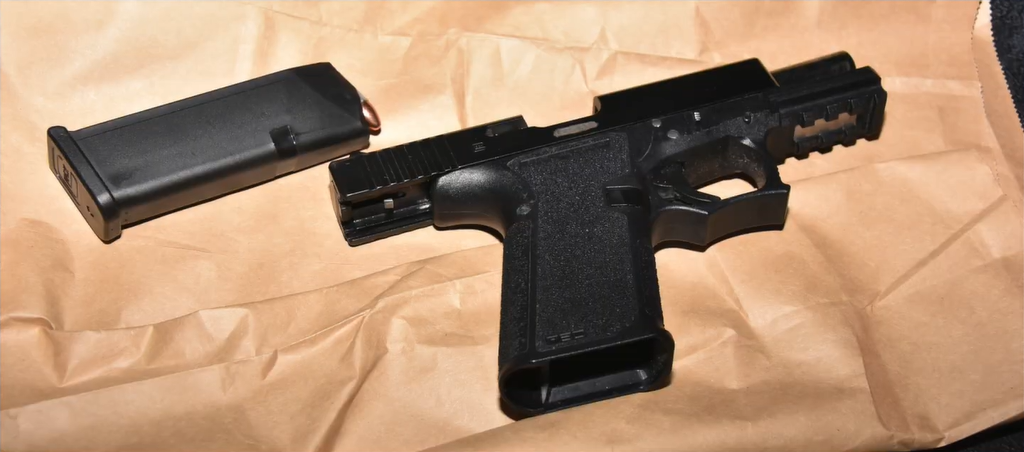
The handgun retrieved from Wilson

Gold was investigated by the San Diego County Sheriff’s Office Homicide Unit and the San Diego County District Attorney's office following the shooting. The Federal Bureau of Investigation (FBI) and the US Attorney’s Office monitored the investigation. The SDPD said officers didn’t see Wilson's handgun on him until they began providing medical aid to him, where they found the gun concealed underneath his clothing on his right thigh. There was no indication Wilson shot his gun during the incident, or had it in his hands when Gold shot him. In December 2025, the San Diego Police Shooting Review Board said it would assess the tactics used in the shooting, and that an internal investigation would be looked over by San Diego's independent Commission on Police Practices.

== Civil litigation and settlement ==
=== Civil litigation ===
On June 6, 2025, Wilson's parents filed a tort claim against the city; they later filed a wrongful death lawsuit against the SDPD and Daniel Gold. The lawsuit alleged that Gold "instantly, without any warning" fired two shots at Wilson and struck him in the upper body, and that he did not identify himself as a police officer until after shooting Wilson. The lawsuit also said Wilson did not brandish, nor threaten Gold with his handgun at the time he shot him, and that Gold acted with “racial violence” because of Wilson's race. Wilson was mixed-race, but the lawsuit identified him as Black. Nicholas Rowley, the family's attorney, said that Wilson carried the gun to defend himself, since he had recently been a target of gang members in the area and was assaulted at one point.

During the lawsuit, Gold was allowed to carry his service pistol. Gold also listed himself as an acting detective within the department after the shooting, though the SDPD denied this and said he was still working "in an administrative capacity" and never received a promotion or pay increase.

=== Settlement ===
On December 9, 2025, the San Diego City Council voted 8-0 to approve a $30 million payment to the family of Wilson. In the settlement documents, attorneys for the city said that the settlement was a business decision, and that the settlement did not constitute an "admission of liability by any party." The city of San Diego paid for $5 million of the total settlement amount, and the rest of the $25 million was paid for by a public liability fund.

The settlement is considered the largest police killing settlement in US history. The settlement exceeded the $27 million the Minneapolis City Council agreed to pay the family of George Floyd in March 2021 after he was murdered by police officer Derek Chauvin, and the $20 million the city of Minneapolis gave to the family of Justine Damond after her death.
