= Crime in San Diego =

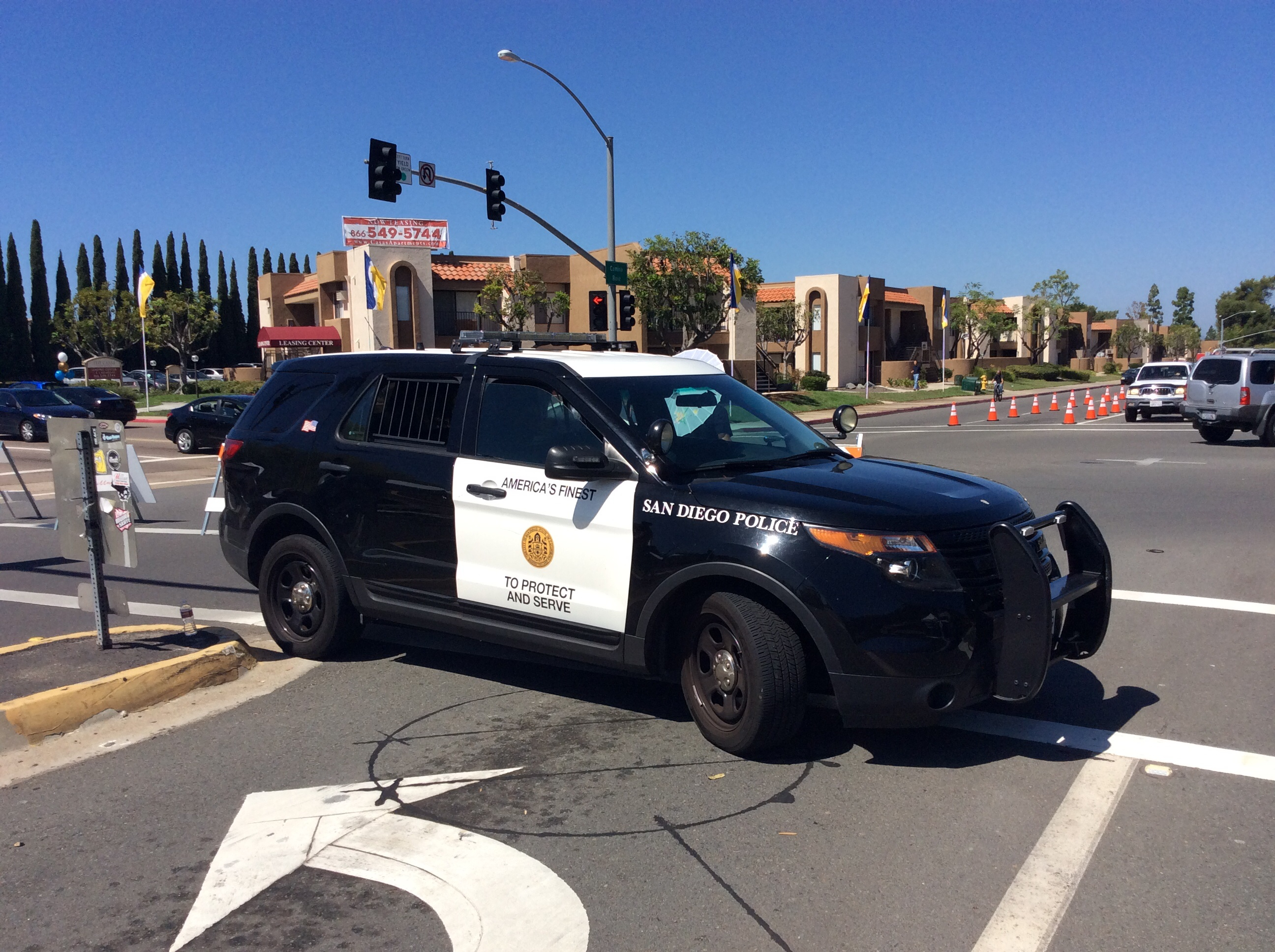
San Diego Police Department Ford Police Interceptor Utility vehicle in 2015

Crime in San Diego is tracked by the city government of San Diego, which has published crime statistics since 1950. In San Diego, the crime rate is relatively low compared to the rest of the United States. Several news sources ranked San Diego within the top twenty safest cities in the United States since 2010. In 2017, the crime rate in San Diego was the lowest it had ever been since 1959. Despite the city's low crime rate, San Diego is a major port in the international illegal drug trade, especially when it comes to methamphetamine and fentanyl, produced and trafficked largely by the Sinaloa Cartel. In the 1980s, the city was called the meth capital of the United States, and in the 2020s, the city and the larger region became a national epicenter of fentanyl trafficking. The city has also faced scandals from public officials over the decades, with several mayors being forced to resign.

== Overview ==
In 2006, Police Chief William Lansdowne said that San Diego became the sixth-safest city among those in the country with at least 500,000 people in 2004. In 2005, the violent crime rate reached a 25-year low at 4.5 crimes per 1,000 population. Since 2010, news organizations have included San Diego among the twenty safest cities in the United States: 9th in 2010 by Forbes, 20th in 2012 by Business Insider, and 12th in 2019 by U.S. News & World Report. In 2017, the Federal Bureau of Investigation named San Diego the safest big city in the U.S. due to its homicide rate in 2016. The violent crime rate of the city in 2017 was 3.7 per 1,000 people, the lowest among the ten most populous cities in the country.

=== Crime rate ===
The following chart contains the annual crime rate per 1,000 population of the city of San Diego since 1950:

- Theft
- Vehicle theft
- Burglary
- Aggravated assault
- Robbery
- Rape
- Murder

=== Actual crimes ===
The following chart contains the actual crimes committed in the city of San Diego every year since 1950 (does not take population growth or decline into account):

- Theft
- Vehicle theft
- Burglary
- Aggravated assault
- Robbery
- Rape
- Murder

== Crime by category ==
=== Criminal organizations ===
As of 2014, there are 4,100 gang members in 91 gangs in the city of San Diego, according to police lieutenant Keith Lucas. In 2013, the San Diego Association of Governments (SANDAG) published a county-wide gang arrestees report on the preceding year and found that the average initiation age of gang members was 13.5 years and 61 percent of arrestees reported that they had family members who were also gang members. In the report, the law enforcement agencies in the county informed SANDAG that gangs commit about a quarter of all crimes in the county.

=== Drug trafficking ===
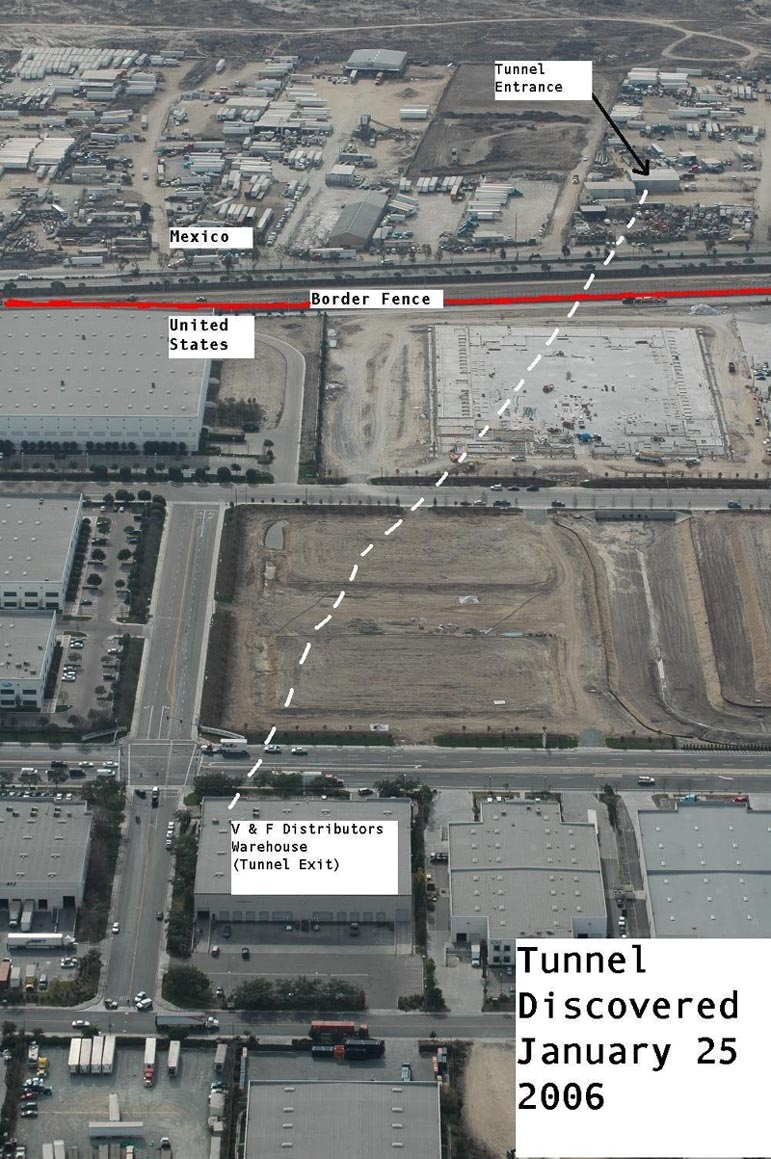
In 2006, the Drug Enforcement Administration discovered a drug tunnel operated by the Sinaloa Cartel in San Diego–Tijuana

In the 1980s, San Diego held the dubious distinction of being the meth capital of the United States. In the 1960s, the Hells Angels motorcycle club was the chief distributor of meth in the state, and production across the southern border in Mexico was mostly unimpeded by law enforcement, allowing for the drug to be widely available in San Diego.

Downtown San Diego

In 2000, the National Drug Intelligence Center published a threat assessment on drugs in the Southern District of California. It found that, while the California–Mexico border comprised about 7 percent of the southwest border, it made up 18 percent of the drug seizures in the region. The assessment stated that all drugs of abuse—meth, black tar heroin, and marijuana in particular—were readily available and supplied by Mexican drug trafficking organizations. In 2014, California Attorney General Kamala Harris issued a report that stated that about 70 percent of the meth from Mexico came through San Diego's ports of entry, outpacing border communities in Arizona and Texas since 2009. U.S. Immigration and Customs Enforcement spokesperson Lauren Mack hypothesized that the city's proximity to Mexico, its position on a central smuggling corridor, and its easy freeway access to points of high demand could be reasons for that fact. The spokesperson said that San Diego used to be a meth production hub, but production moved across the border into Tijuana and Baja California. Mack also stated that the Sinaloa Cartel played a significant role in the region's ongoing meth trade.

In August 2022, the federal government said that the San Diego region became an epicenter of another drug, fentanyl. According to statistics provided by the United States Border Patrol and Customs and Border Protection, all of the fentanyl seized by law enforcement in the counties of San Diego and Imperial between October 2021 and June 2022 amounted to 60% of the fentanyl seized at any port of entry throughout the United States in the same period.

In downtown San Diego, business owners close to 5th Avenue along with C Street claim that homelessness, vandalism, as well as drug use has progressively become widespread. Data from the city has demonstrated halfway through the year of 2026, there have been 390 arrests in the 900-1000 block of the area, also including 68 for possession of a controlled substance, 71 arrests for drug paraphernalia, and lastly, 42 for loitering, which was relevant to drug activity. Between the time period of January 2025 all the way through October 2026, there has been at least 200 arrests.

=== Sex crimes ===
San Diego has reported fluctuating rates of sex crimes over the years, with law enforcement and advocacy groups working to address the issue through education, prevention programs, and victim support services. According to the San Diego Police Department’s annual crime reports, incidents of rape and other sex offenses have seen periodic increases, with 496 instances of reported rape in 2022. A rape charge is considered a violent felony crime and a conviction will result in a lengthy sentence in a state prison.

=== Public corruption ===
In 1985, San Diego mayor Roger Hedgecock resigned from his position after a jury found him guilty of committing 13 felony charges for conspiring with several prominent supporters to funnel more than $360,000 in illegal contributions into his campaign and subsequent perjury. In 2005, mayor Dick Murphy and several other officials resigned while there was an ongoing investigation into the city's pension fund. Two members of the San Diego City Council, including deputy mayor Michael Zucchet, were also subjects in another federal investigation case. A federal jury convicted then-acting mayor Zucchet and councilman Ralph Inzunza in July for accepting bribes from a strip club owner to promote the repeal of a "no touch" law. In 2013, mayor Bob Filner resigned amid sexual harassment allegations. Several months later, Filner pleaded guilty to one count of false imprisonment and two counts of battery.

== See also ==
- Crime in California
- List of California street gangs
