= Chunking (writing) =

Writing or copyediting method

Chunking is a method of presenting information which splits concepts into small pieces or "chunks" of information to make reading and understanding faster and easier. Chunking is especially useful for material presented on the web because readers tend to scan for specific information on a web page rather than read the page sequentially.

Chunked content usually contains:

- bulleted lists
- short sub-headings
- short sentences with one or two ideas per sentence
- short paragraphs, even one-sentence paragraphs
- easily scannable text, with bolding of key phrases
- inline graphics to guide the eyes or illustrate points which would normally require more words

== Advantages ==
- Chunking helps technical communicators or marketers convey information more efficiently
- Chunking helps readers find what they are looking for quickly
- Chunking allows material to be presented consistently from page to page, so users can apply previous knowledge of page layout and navigation and focus on the content rather than the presentation

The bite, snack and meal is a popular phrase for a specific means of chunking content.

== See also ==
- Chunking (psychology)
