= Center City =

Center City or Centre City may refer to:

== Places ==
- Center City, Minnesota, U.S.
  - Center City Historic District
- Center City Allentown, Pennsylvania, U.S.
- Center City, Erie, Pennsylvania U.S.
- Center City, Harrisburg, Pennsylvania, U.S.
- Center City, Philadelphia, Pennsylvania U.S.
- Center City, Pittsburgh, Pennsylvania U.S.
- Center City, or Uptown Charlotte, North Carolina, U.S.

== Other uses ==
- Centre City Building, Dayton, Ohio U.S.
- Center City High School in Escondido California U.S.
- Center City Mall in Paterson, New Jersey U.S.
- Centre City Mall, Dunedin, New Zealand

== See also ==
- Central city
- Citi Centre (disambiguation)
- City Center (disambiguation)
- Centre City Tower (disambiguation)
- Center (disambiguation), including centre
- City (disambiguation)
