= City Center (disambiguation) =

A city center or city centre is the commercial, cultural and often the historical, political, and geographic heart of a city.

City Center, or City Centre, may also refer to:

- Central business district
- Downtown

== Canada ==
- Edmonton City Centre, Edmonton, Alberta
- Bramalea City Centre, Bramalea, Ontario
- Islington-City Centre West, Toronto, Ontario
- Scarborough City Centre, Toronto, Ontario

== India ==
- City Centre, Mangalore, Karnataka, India
- City Centre Mall, Shimoga, Karnataka, India
- City Centre Mall, Sambalpur, Odisha, India

== Iran ==
- Isfahan City Center

== United States ==
Ordered by city:

- Columbus City Center, Columbus, Ohio
- City Center District, Dallas, Texas
- City Center Mall, Grand Forks, North Dakota
- CityCentre, Houston, Texas
- CityCenter, Las Vegas area (Paradise), Nevada
- Brickell City Centre, Downtown Miami, Florida
- City Center (Miami Beach), Florida
- Minneapolis City Center, Minneapolis, Minnesota
- New York City Center, a performing arts venue, New York, New York
- City Center at Oyster Point, Newport News, Virginia
- Oakland City Center, Oakland, California
- City Center station (UTA), Salt Lake City, Utah
- CityCenterDC, Washington, D.C.
- City Center at White Plains, White Plains, New York

== United Kingdom ==
- City Centre (Edinburgh ward), an electoral ward of Edinburgh, Scotland
- City Centre (Manchester ward), a former electoral ward of Manchester, England
- City Centre North, an electoral ward in Liverpool, Merseyside, England
- City Centre South, an electoral ward in Liverpool, Merseyside, England
- Belfast city centre, Northern Ireland
- Birmingham city centre, West Midlands, England
- Brighton and Hove city centre, East Sussex, England
- Bristol city centre, England
- Cardiff city centre, Wales
- Dundee city centre, Scotland
- Glasgow city centre, Scotland
- Leeds city centre, West Yorkshire, England
- Leicester city centre, England
- Liverpool city centre, Merseyside, England
- Manchester city centre, Greater Manchester, England
- Newcastle city centre, Tyne and Wear, England
- Newport city centre, Wales
- Nottingham city centre, Nottinghamshire, England
- Sheffield city centre, South Yorkshire, England
- Southampton city centre, Hampshire, England
- Sunderland city centre, Tyne and Wear, England
- Swansea city centre, Wales
- Wrexham city centre, Wales

== Elsewhere ==
- City Centre Bahrain, Bahrain
- City-Center, a 1960s redevelopment plan for Helsinki, Finland
- City Centre Deira, Dubai, United Arab Emirates

== See also ==
- Central city, or core city
- Center City (disambiguation)
- Centre City (disambiguation)
- Citi Centre (disambiguation)
- Centre (disambiguation) including center
- City (disambiguation)
