= The City =

The City may refer to:

== Places ==
- A city centre in general

=== United States ===
- New York City, New York
  - Manhattan, one of the five boroughs of New York City
- the City of Chicago, Illinois, particularly as distinct from the various suburban municipalities and communities surrounding it, making-up the rest of the "Chicagoland" metropolitan region and outlying hinterlands
- San Francisco, California
- The City Shopping Center, a former name of The Outlets at Orange in Orange, California
- The City, a brand used from 2008 to 2009 at several prototype locations of former American consumer electronics retailer Circuit City

=== United Kingdom ===
- "The City", a term for the City of London, the historic core of London; also used to refer to the British financial services sector
- The City, Buckinghamshire, a village and civil parish
- The City, Manchester, a listed former public house

=== Turkey ===
- Istanbul (formerly Constantinople) has been known as “the city” in the past, the name being derived from the words “to The City”

=== Fictional cities ===
- The City (The Tick), the fictional setting of The Tick comic books and TV series
- The City (Transmetropolitan), a fictional megacity in the Vertigo comic Transmetropolitan
- "The City", the setting of the Thief video game series

== Books and websites ==
- The City (website), a New York City based non-profit, digital news site founded in 2018
- The City (Park and Burgess book), a 1925 book by Robert E. Park and Ernest W. Burgess
- The City (Pidmohylny novel), a 1928 novel by Valerian Pidmohylny
- "The City" (poem), an 1894 poem by Constantine P. Cavafy
- "The City" (short story), a 1951 short story by Ray Bradbury
- The City (Weber book), a 1921 book by Max Weber
- The City (wordless novel), a 1925 wordless novel by Frans Masereel
- The City, a 1909 play by Clyde Fitch
- The City, a 1990–2014 comic strip by Derf Backderf
- The City (Koontz novel), a 2014 novel by Dean Koontz
- The City, a 1993 graphic novel by James Herbert
- The City (magazine), an American magazine of evangelical Christianity
- The City, a 1965 play by Loula Anagnostaki
- The City, a 2008 play by Martin Crimp

== Film, television ==
=== Film ===
- The City (1916 film), a 1916 film
- The City (1926 film), a lost 1926 silent film
- The City (1939 film), an American documentary by Steiner and Van Dyke
- The City (1977 film), a pilot for an unproduced American crime drama TV series
- The City (1982 film), a Taiwanese film written by Wu Nien-jen
- The City (1994 film), a Malayalam action film
- The City (1998 film), an American neo-realist film by David Riker

=== Television ===
- The City (1995 TV series), an American soap opera, 1995–1997
- The City (1999 TV series), a Canadian prime time soap opera
- The City (2008 TV series), an American reality television series, 2008–2010

== Music ==
- The City (band), a 1980s alternative rock band
- The City (group), a music trio composed of Carole King, Danny Kortchmar, and Charles Larkey
- The City (XM), an Urban Top 40 radio channel
- "The City", the setting of Greenday's 2004 concept album American Idiot

=== Albums ===
- The City (Vangelis album), 1990
- The City (FemBots album), 2005
- The City (EP), a 2012 EP by Madeon, or its title song

=== Songs ===
- "The City" (song), a 2012 song by The 1975
- "The City", a 1999 song by The Dismemberment Plan from Emergency & I
- "The City", a 2011 song by The Chariot from Long Live
- "The City", a 2011 song by Ed Sheeran from +
- "The City", a 2011 song by Game from The R.E.D. Album
- "The City", a 2011 song by The Haunted from Unseen
- "The City", a 2011 song by Patrick Wolf from Lupercalia
- "The City", a 2012 song by Madeon from Adventure

== Visual arts ==
- The City (Léger), a 1919 painting

== See also ==
- City, a large permanent human settlement
- City (disambiguation)
