= City (disambiguation) =

A city is generally an urban settlement with a large population.

City or Cities may also refer to:

== Literature and publications ==
- City (novel), a 1952 novel by Clifford D. Simak
- City (magazine), a Finnish magazine
- City: Magazine International, a former French magazine
- The City (website), a New York City based non-profit digital news startup founded in 2018
- City (newspaper), an Italian free daily newspaper
- City Newspaper, a free alternative weekly in Rochester, New York, US
- Al-Balad ("The City"), the ninetieth sura of the Qur’an
- City (manga), a 2016 Japanese manga series by Keiichi Arawi
- City (journal), a journal of urban trends, culture, theory, policy and action
- Cities (journal), a journal of current and historical urban development and management

== Music ==
=== Albums ===
- City (Client album), 2004
- City (Jane Siberry album), 2001
- City (Strapping Young Lad album), 1997
- City (Chengshi) Chinese album by Deserts Chang 2009
- Cities (Anberlin album), 2007
- Cities (The Cat Empire album), 2006

=== Bands and musicians ===
- City (band), a German rock band
- The City (band), an American alternative rock band of the 1980s
- The City, a trio formed by Carole King in 1968

=== Songs ===
- City (Weapons of Peace song), 1976
- "City", a song by Hollywood Undead from Swan Songs
- "City", a song by Sara Bareilles from Little Voice
- "Cities" (song), a 1980 song by Talking Heads
- "Cities", a 2014 song by Nat & Alex Wolff
- "Cities", a song by Beck for the video game Sound Shapes
- "Cities", a song by the Cat Empire from Cities
- "City", a 2020 song by Ai Furihata
- "The City", a song by Fleetwood Mac from Mystery To Me

== Places ==
=== Australia ===
- City, Australian Capital Territory, the central business district of Canberra, Australia

=== Haiti ===
- City, a village in Sud, Haiti

=== Switzerland ===
- City (Zürich), an area of the Altstadt district of Zürich, Switzerland

=== United Kingdom ===
- City, Powys, a hamlet in Powys, Wales, in the United Kingdom
- City, Vale of Glamorgan, a village in the Vale of Glamorgan, Wales
- City of London, the historic core and chief financial district of London, more usually termed "The City" but sometimes written on maps as "City"

== Television ==
- City (TV series), a 1990 TV series starring Valerie Harper
- Citytv, a Canadian television network owned and operated by Rogers Communications previously named City
  - CITY-DT, a Toronto television station owned-and-operated by Rogers Media
- City TV (Singapore), a defunct Singaporean television channel
- Telecity (Italian TV channel), an Italian regional television channel

== Transportation ==
- Honda City, a Japanese subcompact car
- City Airline, a former Swedish regional airline
- Think City, a Norwegian electric microcar
- Aixam City, also known as Mega City, a French quadricycle

== Other uses ==
- City (artwork), a 1972 piece of earth art by Michael Heizer located in the U.S. state of Nevada
- City (typeface), a slab-serif typeface designed by Georg Trump
- City (board game), published in 1988
- City Interactive, a Polish video game publisher

== See also ==
- The City (disambiguation)
- Citi (disambiguation)
- Citti (surname)
