= Citi (disambiguation) =

Citi may refer to:

== Citigroup related ==
- Citigroup (aka Citi), American financial services company, formerly Citicorp
  - Citibank, American bank, core of the financial group
  - Citibank Canada, the Canadian subsidiary of CitiGroup
  - Citibank Europe, the European subsidiary of CitiGroup
  - Citibank (Hong Kong), the Hongkong subsidiary of CitiGroup
  - Citibank Singapore, the Singaporean subsidiary of CitiGroup
  - Citibank United Arab Emirates, the UAE subsidiary of CitiGroup
- Citigroup Center, the headquarters of Citigroup
- Citi Field, NYC, NYS, USA; a baseball park with naming rights held by CitiGroup
- Citi Open, annual WTA and ATP tennis tournament in the District of Columbia, USA; with naming rights held by CitiGroup

== Other uses ==
- CITI-FM 92.1 MHz; radio station in Winnipeg, Manitoba, Canada
- Citi FM (Ghana), 97.3 MHz; radio station in Accra, Ghana
- Citi Babu (1964–2013) Tamil comedian
- Massimo Citi (born 1955), Italian science fiction writer

== See also ==
- Volkswagen Citi Golf, a car
- Citi Bike, a bikeshare program in NYC, NYS, USA with naming rights held by CitiGroup
- Citi Centre (disambiguation)
- Chitti (disambiguation), aka citti
- Chithi (disambiguation), aka citti
- Citti (surname)
- City (disambiguation)
