= Chiti (disambiguation) =

Chiti is a village in Besisahar Municipality, Lamjung District, Gandaki Pradesh, Nepal.

Chiti may also refer to:

- Chiti, Fars or Jiti, a village in Khesht Rural District, Khesht District, Kazerun County, Iran
- Chiti, Khuzestan or Qal‘eh Chītī, a village in Sadat Rural District, Central District, Lali County, Iran
- Chiti, Lorestan, a village in Zalaqi-ye Gharbi Rural District, Besharat District, Aligudarz County, Iran
- Chiti Mukulu or Chiti the Great, 18th-century King of the Bemba (in modern Zambia)

== People with the surname ==
- Carlo Chiti (1924–1994), Italian racecar driver
- Dom Chiti (born 1958), U.S. baseball coach
- Fabrizio Chiti (born 1971), Italian biochemist
- Gian Paolo Chiti (1939–2026), Italian musician
- Harry Chiti (1932–2002), U.S. baseball player
- Patricia Adkins Chiti (died 2018), British singer and musicologist
- Vannino Chiti (born 1947), Italian politician

== See also ==
- Chiki
- Chithi (disambiguation)
- Chitti (disambiguation)
- Citti, a surname
- Fondazione Adkins Chiti: Donne in Musica (Chiti Foundation for Women in Music)
- Warang Chiti, the alphabetic script of the Southeast Asian Ho language found in India
