= Citigroup Center (disambiguation) =

Citigroup Center may refer to:

- Citigroup Center, a skyscraper in New York City
- Citigroup Centre (London), a building complex in London
- Citigroup Centre (Sydney), a skyscraper in Sydney
- Citigroup Tower in Shanghai, China

== See also ==
- 777 Tower, a skyscraper in Los Angeles formerly known as Citicorp Plaza
- Accenture Tower (Chicago), a skyscraper in Chicago formerly known as Citigroup Center
- Citi Centre
- Devon Energy Tower (Houston), formerly known as the Citicorp Building
- FourFortyFour South Flower, a skyscraper in Los Angeles formerly known as Citigroup Center
- One Court Square, a skyscraper in Queens, New York sometimes known as the Citigroup Building
- One Sansome Street, a skyscraper in San Francisco, sometimes known as Citigroup Center
- Three Garden Road in Hong Kong, formerly known as Citigroup Plaza
