= Jenna Gregory =

Histopathologist

Jenna Mair Gregory FRCPath
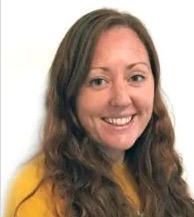
- Born: January 22, 1984 (age 42); Stockport, England
- Education: University of St. Andrews (BSc); University of Cambridge (MBChir, PhD); University of Edinburgh (MSc, MMedSci)
- Scientific career
- Fields: Neuroscience; Pathology; Molecular pathology Preventive healthcare
- Workplaces: University of Aberdeen
- Thesis: Investigating the role of TDP-43 aggregation in the pathogenesis of ALS and FTD-U (2011, University of Cambridge)
- Doctoral advisor: Sir Christopher Martin Dobson FRS FMedSci FRSC
Additional theses
- MSc: A systematic approach to identify oral neuroprotective interventions for motor neuron disease (2015, University of Edinburgh)
- MMedSci: Interrogating the spatial transcriptome of motor neurone disease (2016, University of Edinburgh)
- Website: Gregory Laboratory

Professor Jenna Gregory (born 22 January 1984) BSc MSc MMedSci PhD MBChir (Cantab.) FRCPath is a British clinical academic and consultant histopathologist who holds a Clinical Chair at the University of Aberdeen, specializing in neurodegenerative diseases with a focus on early detection and disease prevention. She serves as Clinical Lead for the NHS Grampian Tissue Bank. Jenna’s research investigates the pathomechanisms of ALS-FTSD and other neurodegenerative diseases with a translational focus on combining early detection priorities with precision-medicine principles to empower precision-prevention strategies.

She is a researcher and clinician, with experience in running clinical trials and biomarker development. She holds academic qualification in neuroscience (BSc, PhD), clinical trials (MSc), and molecular pathology (MMedSci) with professional qualifications in medicine (MBChir) and pathology (FRCPath).

== Early life and education ==
Jenna Gregory was born in Stockport, England. She began her medical education at the University of St Andrews in 2003, where she obtained an intercalated BSc in Neuroscience in 2007.

In 2007, Gregory joined the University of Cambridge as part of the MD PhD programme, obtaining her PhD in Chemistry and Medicine in 2011 under the supervision of Chris DobsonFRS FMedSci FRSC.

In 2013, she entered the academic foundation programme at the University of Edinburgh, completing a part-time MSc in Clinical Trials (2013–2016) and a MMedSci in Molecular Pathology (2016–2017). She began specialist training in pathology in 2017.

In 2018, Gregory established her independent research group as a clinical lecturer at the University of Edinburgh and was awarded a Scottish Clinical Research Excellence Development Scheme (SCREDS) Clinical Lectureship. She later received a Jean Shanks Foundation Grant and a Pathological Society Clinical Lecturer Support Grant.

Gregory moved to University of Aberdeen in 2022, where she established her research group as a Senior Lecturer at the Institute of Medical Sciences. She qualified as a consultant histopathologist (FRCPath) in 2021 and began practicing with NHS Grampian in 2022. She became clinical lead for the NHS Grampian Biorepository/Tissue bank in 2023. She became Clinical Professor at the University of Aberdeen in 2024.

== Research and Career ==
=== St. Andrews (2003–2007) ===
As part of an intercalated medical degree at the University of St. Andrews, Jenna obtained a BSc in Neuroscience in 2007 with project thesis supervised by Prof. Jim Aiton working on the chaperone Peroxiredoxin II, entitled “Over-expression of peroxiredoxin II protects cultured SK-N-SH cells from amyloid-beta toxicity”.

=== Cambridge (2007–2013) ===
Jenna moved to the University of Cambridge in 2008 as part of the MD PhD programme, working out of the Departments of Genetics and Chemistry, and obtained her PhD in Chemistry and Medicine in 2011 under the supervision of Sir Chris Dobson FRS FMedSci FRSC with thesis entitled “Investigating the role of TDP-43 aggregation in the pathogenesis of ALS and FTD-U”.

As part of her PhD at the University of Cambridge, Jenna created and published one of the first TDP-43 Drosophila melanogaster animal models for preclinical research in amyotrophic lateral sclerosis, and showed that the molecular chaperone Clusterin could also participate in intracellular aggregation events rescuing TDP-43 pathology in a paper that was later published in 2017.

=== Edinburgh (2013–2022) ===
Jenna moved to the University of Edinburgh as part of the prestigious academic foundation programme in 2013. Alongside her full-time clinical training on this programme Jenna obtained a part-time MSc in Clinical Trials (2013–2016) with thesis titled, “A systematic approach to identify oral neuroprotective interventions for motor neuron disease”.

As part of her MSc in Clinical Trials, and to inform drug selection for MND SMART (Motor Neuron Disease – Systematic Multi-arm Adaptive Randomised Trial), Jenna undertook a large systematic review and meta-analysis of all published literature in neurodegenerative disease (study protocol published in Evidence-based Preclinical Medicine in 2016). This study included >14,000 human and animal model publications screened for relevance, with data extracted from 396 studies with findings presented in Jenna’s MSc thesis, therein, Jenna identified memantine as the leading drug candidate for oral intervention in MND, leading to the data-driven selection of memantine as one of the first two drugs (along with trazadone) trialled in MND-SMART, which recruited its first patient on 27/02/2020.

In her capacity as a clinical trialist, Jenna contributed to the initial versions of the trial protocol and the ethics submission for MND-SMART, the first adaptive multi-arm clinical trial for a neurodegenerative disease in the world, which in 2018 received a £1.5 million investment from MND Scotland to establish the UK-wide MND-SMART clinical trial, and whose ethics submission was approved by the West of Scotland Research Ethics Committee on 2 October 2019.

Recognising the important contribution of molecular stratification in oncology clinical trials, alongside the relative absence of molecular markers in neurodegeneration, Jenna undertook an MMedSci in Molecular Pathology (2016–2017) with funding from Biogen and the MRC. Jenna went to Karolinska Institute to learn spatial sequencing techniques (later to become 10X sequencing) in the lab of Joakim Lundberg, producing her thesis “Interrogating the spatial transcriptome of motor neurone disease”.

In 2018, Jenna established her independent research group as a clinical lecturer at the University of Edinburgh having been awarded a SCREDS Clinical Lectureship. This was followed in 2019 by a Scottish Universities Life Sciences Alliance (SULSA) Postdoctoral and Early Career Researcher Exchange Scheme (PECRE) award to train at the New York Genome Centre/Columbia University for the project ‘Interrogating the spatial transcriptome of cognition in ALS patients’. In 2020 Jenna was awarded a Jean Shanks Foundation Grant and a Pathological Society Clinical Lecturer Support Grant.

=== Aberdeen (2022–present) ===
Jenna moved to Aberdeen in 2022, establishing her research group as a Senior Lecturer at the Institute of Medical Sciences of the University of Aberdeen, with a translational focus on precision-prevention and precision medicine in neurodegenerative diseases.

In 2022 Jenna qualified as a consultant histopathologist (FRCPath) in 2021, and was awarded a Target ALS Early-Stage Clinician Grant. She became the clinical lead for the NHS Grampian Biorepository/Tissue bank in 2023, and became Clinical Professor at the University of Aberdeen in 2024.

== Research Themes ==
Themes in Jenna Gregory’s research in neurodegenerative diseases include:

1. ALS pathomechanisms and protein aggregation

2. Biomarkers and molecular diagnostics

3. Neuroinflammation and immune mechanisms

4. Cognition and brain health

5. Machine learning and AI in neurodegenerative disease research

6. Clinical trials and drug repurposing

7. Spatial transcriptomics

8. Epidemiological studies in ALS

9. Biophysics and structural biology

10. Disease heterogeneity: stratification and precision medicine

11. RNA biology and mRNA localisation

12. ALS genetics and molecular mechanisms

13. Cell energetics, proteostasis, stress and cell phenotypes

14. Resources and methods in histopathology

== Selected publications ==
Spence* H, Waldron* FM, Saleeb RS, Brown AL, Rifai OM, Gilodi M, Read F, Roberts K, Milne G, Wilkinson D, O'Shaughnessy J, Pastore A, Fratta P, Shneider N, Tartaglia GG, Zacco E, Horrocks MH, Gregory JM (2024). RNA aptamer reveals nuclear TDP-43 pathology is an early aggregation event that coincides with STMN-2 cryptic splicing and precedes clinical manifestation in ALS. Acta Neuropathologica 2024 Mar 5;147(1):50. *equal contributions

Balendra R, Sreedharan J, Hallegger M, Luisier R, Lashuel HA, Gregory JM, Patani R (2025). Amyotrophic lateral sclerosis caused by TARDBP mutations: from genetics to TDP-43 proteinopathy. Lancet Neurology 24(5):456-470

Cox D, Burke M, Milani S, White MA, Waldron FM, Böken D, Lobanova E, Sreedharan J, Gregory JM, Klenerman D (2025). Quantitative profiling of nanoscopic protein aggregates reveals specific fingerprint of TDP-43-positive assemblies in motor neuron disease. Advanced Science e05484

Pattle SB, O’Shaughnessy J, Kantelberg O, Rifai OM, Pate J, Nellany K, Hays N, Arends MJ, Horrocks MH, Waldron FM, Gregory JM (2023). pTDP-43 aggregates accumulate in non-CNS tissues prior to symptom onset in ALS: a case series linking archival surgical biopsies with clinical phenotypic data. Journal of Pathology: Clinical Research 9:44-55.

== Funding ==
Jenna Gregory’s research has been funded by Target ALS, MND Association, LifeArc, National Institutes of Health, MND Scotland, Jean Shanks Foundation, Scottish Universities Life Science Alliance, UKRI/Medical Research Council, MND Scotland and Scottish Government’s Chief Scientist Office, The Royal Society, Chan Zuckerberg Initiative, Pathological Society, Academy of Medical Sciences.
