= John Humphrey Plummer Professor =

Professorship at Cambridge

The John Humphrey Plummer Professorships were established in 1931 from a bequest of £200,000 under the will of John Humphrey Plummer, an estate agent of Southport, to the University of Cambridge for the advancement of science. The fund has been used to endow a series of professorships in various scientific fields under a number of titles.

== John Humphrey Plummer Professors ==
=== Colloidal Physics ===
- 1930–1931 Sir Eric Rideal

=== Colloid Science ===
- 1931–1946 Sir Eric Rideal
- 1947–1966 Francis Roughton

=== Mathematical Physics ===
- 1932–1944 Sir Ralph H. Fowler
- 1946–1958 Douglas Hartree

=== Theoretical Chemistry ===
- 1932–1953 Sir John Lennard-Jones (elected Principal of the University College of North Staffordshire, later Keele University, in 1953)
- 1954–1967 Christopher Longuet-Higgins

=== Physics ===
- 1960–1971 Sir Brian Pippard (elected Cavendish Professor of Physics in 1971)
- 1972–1984 Sir Sam Edwards

=== Biophysics ===
- 1970–1981 Sir Alan Hodgkin (awarded the Nobel Prize in Physiology or Medicine in 1963)

=== Applied Numerical Analysis ===
- 1976–2001 Michael J. D. Powell

=== Cell Biology ===
- 1983–2002 Sir John Gurdon (awarded the Nobel Prize in Physiology or Medicine in 2012)

=== Magnetic Resonance ===
- 1987–1999 Ray Freeman

=== Theoretical Physics ===
- 1993–2009 Michael Green (elected Lucasian Professor of Mathematics in 2009)

=== Developmental Biology ===
- 2001–2008 Sir Jim Cuthbert Smith

=== Chemical and Structural Biology ===
- 2001–2017 Sir Chris Dobson (elected Master of St John's College in 2007)

=== Physics of Materials ===
- 2004–2014 Ullrich Steiner

=== Machine Learning, Artificial Intelligence, and Medicine ===
- 2018–present Mihaela van der Schaar
