= Targui =

Board game

Targui is a board game published in 1988 by Jumbo Games that simulates warfare between Touareg tribes of North Africa to acquire economically strong territories.

== Description ==
Targui is a game for 2–4 players, each of which controls a different Touareg tribe. ("Targui" is the singular of "Touareg".)

=== Components ===
In addition to a blank board with 49 squares (7 x 7), the game box contains 53 land tiles, 140 markers (35 x 4 different colors), 20 tribe cards, 16 Destiny cards, camel pawns, and gold and silver coins.

=== Setup ===
Players decide how long the game will be, from 8 to 16 game turns. Land tiles are randomly placed on the game board until all 49 squares have been covered. Each player chooses a corner of the board which then represents their home oasis. Each player is given five tribe cards, ten camels, five silver coins and one gold coin.

=== Gameplay ===
Each game turn is subdivided into a certain number of rounds, which is determined by a die roll at the start of each game turn.

Each player gets a turn during each impulse, the order of play being determined randomly. On each turn, a player can either claim unoccupied land or attempt to conquer occupied land.

==== Unoccupied land ====
A player can move one or more move camel tokens into an adjacent and unoccupied land to claim it. This ownership remains even after all the owner's camels have been moved elsewhere, unless another player moves their own camels in while it is unoccupied and thus claims ownership.

==== Occupied land ====
To conquer an occupied territory, a player must attack from an adjacent land. Combat is resolved for the attacker by adding a die roll to the total strategic value of all the lands owned by the attacker. This number is divided in half and the result represents the number of camels lost by the defender. The defender then goes through the same exercise, resulting in a loss of camels for the attacker.

=== Receiving money and buying reinforcements ===
At the end of each player's turn, the player receives coins equal to the total economic status of the player's lands. The player can also buy new camel reinforcement with their coins.

=== Victory conditions ===
A player can win outright by eliminating all other players. If this does not happen before the end of the game, then the player with the highest economic status — the total value of all the lands they own — is the winner.

== Reception ==
In Issue 6 of the British games magazine Games International, Brian Walker recommended the 12-turn option over the 16-turn option, writing that the shorter option "would take about two hours to complete. The full 16 turns is too much for the game to handle, especially if there has been an elimination and you've got paranoiac wailing away in the background. You know how these people can be." Walker concluded by giving the game an above-average rating of 4 out of 5.

In Issue 51 of the French games magazine Jeux & Stratégie, Michel Brassine called this game "a classic theme of combat for territories, but which the presentation and the type of modular board make original." Although Brassine found the rules simple and quick to learn, they were "poorly explained." Brassine concluded by giving the game scores of 9 out of 10 for presentation, 8 out of 10 for originality, and a perfect overall score, saying, "Targui is a real strategy game: a bit like in Risk, you have to attack to conquer territories while defending yourself. You need to know how to manage your camels. An excellent game with a high degree or replayability."

== Reviews ==
- Perfidious Albion #71 (p11-12)

== Awards ==
- Targui was a Recommended Game at the 1988 Spiel des Jahres.
