= Michele Vendruscolo =

Italian British physicist

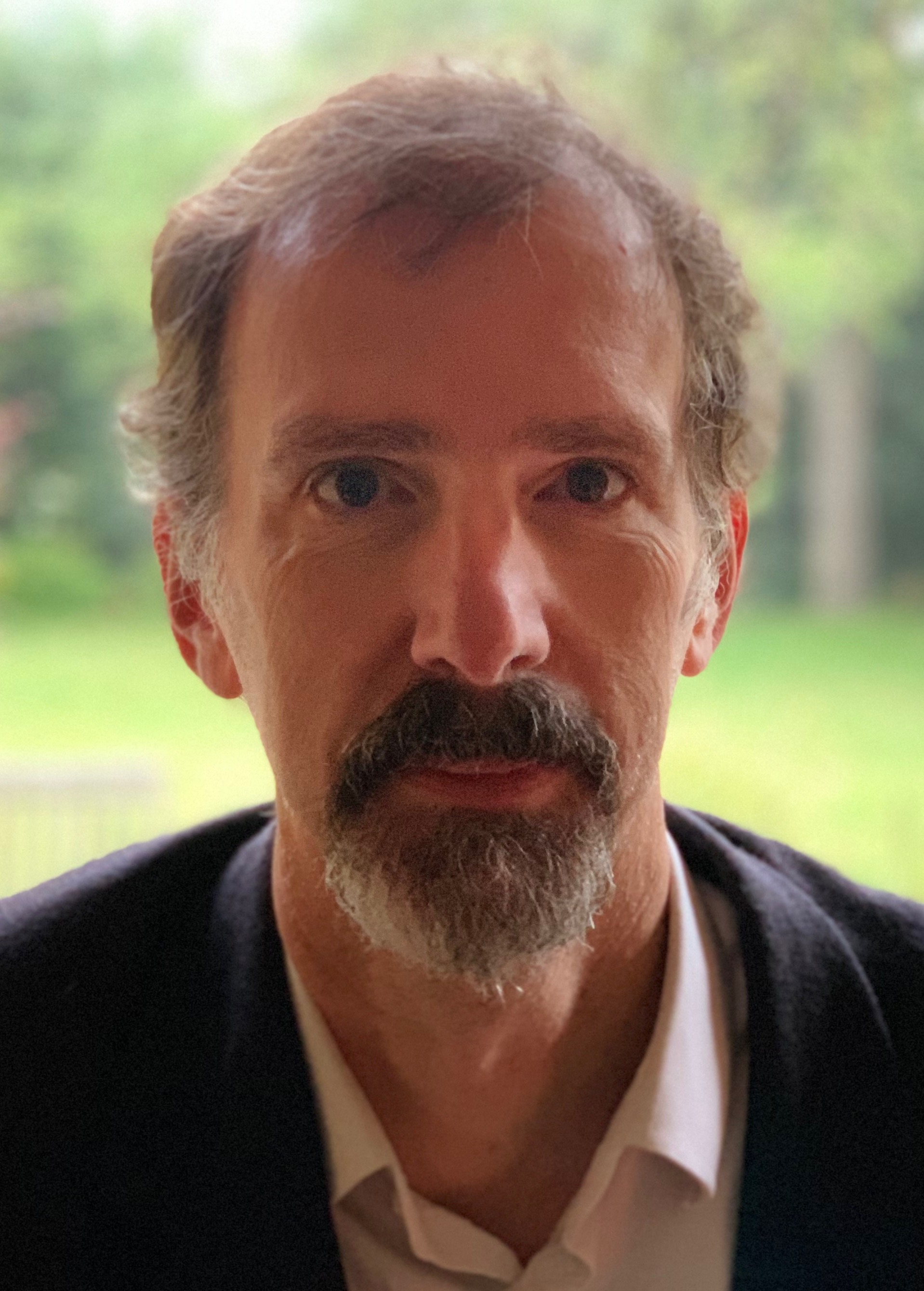
- Michele Vendruscolo in 2019
- Born: 23 July 1966 (age 60); Udine, Italy
- Education: Physics, University of Trieste, Italy(E.N.S., 1992)
- Known for: Protein folding and misfolding
- Awards: Member of the Academia Europaea (2017); Soft Matter & Biophysical Chemistry Award, Royal Society of Chemistry, (2013); Rita and John Cornforth Award, Royal Society of Chemistry, (2019); EMBO Young Investigator (2008)
- Scientific career
- Fields: Physics, chemistry, neuroscience
- Workplaces: Department of Chemistry, University of Cambridge
- Doctoral advisor: Amos Maritan
- Other academic advisors: Eytan Domany, Chris Dobson
- Website: www-vendruscolo.ch.cam.ac.uk

Michele Vendruscolo (born in Udine, 23 July 1966) is an Italian British physicist working in the UK, noted for his theoretical and experimental work on protein folding, misfolding and aggregation.

== Education ==
Vendruscolo is a graduate in physics of the University of Trieste (Italy). He received a Master of Science (MSc) and a PhD in condensed matter physics at the International School for Advanced Studies in Trieste, Italy. He then worked as a postdoctoral researcher, at the Weizmann Institute, Israel with Eytan Domany as a supervisor (1996–1998) and at the University of Oxford (1999–2001) under the supervision of Chris Dobson.

== Research and career ==
He was appointed as an independent academic at the University of Cambridge as a Royal Society University Research Fellow (2001), as a Lecturer (2006), and then as a Reader (2008) in Theoretical Chemical Biology. He is now Professor of Biophysics at the same university. He is also Director of Chemistry of Health, and Co-Director of the Centre for Misfolding Diseases at the University of Cambridge.

Vendruscolo provided contributions in the field of protein folding, misfolding and aggregation. He introduced the approach of simulating complex protein structures in transient or otherwise undetectable states (transition states, transient intermediates, transient aggregates, etc.) using exploitable experimental data as restraints. He edited computational programs able to predict essential characteristics of protein folding and protein aggregation. In a collaboration with other scholars he dissected the process of Amyloid fibril formation in its microscopic steps and computed programs to analyse experimental kinetic time courses and study effects of Small molecules and other agents.

== Awards and honors ==
- Election to EMBO Young Investigator program, European Molecular Biology Organization, 2008
- Soft Matter & Biophysical Chemistry Award, Royal Society of Chemistry, 2013
- Election to member of Academia Europaea, 2017
- Awarded Giuseppe Occhialini Medal and Prize, 2017
- Rita and John Cornforth Award, Royal Society of Chemistry, 2019
