= Jumbo Games =

Dutch jigsaw puzzle and game company

Jumbo Games is a Dutch founded jigsaw puzzle and games company which was established in 1853 and is owned by M&R de Monchy N.V. Jumbo Games produce and manufacture all of their jigsaw puzzles and cardboard based games in their own factory that is based in the Netherlands. The Jumbo head office is located in the Netherlands and there are also offices in the UK, Germany and Belgium.

Previous to being known as Jumbo Games in the UK, the company was called Falcon Games and this was the brand name given to its range of adult puzzles. Falcon was established in 1976 and Jumbo is often still referred to by the Falcon brand name in the UK.

== History ==
The origins of the firm can be traced to the Hausemann & Hotte partnership in the mid-nineteenth century between the Amsterdam department store owner Engelbert Hausemann, a German, and Wilhelm Hotte, who together imported games and puzzles into the Netherlands.

After the First World War, Hausemann & Hotte expanded their range of toys and games. This included the Meccano metal construction kits, Continental Caoutchouc rubber balls, dolls’ prams by Heinrichmaier & Wunsch, ‘Jutta’ dolls by Dressel, Emata slates, Hohner mouth organs, cars and figurines by Lehmann and Spears games.

During the inter-war years, Hausemann & Hotte commissioned wooden toys by the Mauritz en Ball company of Zeist. These toys had to be made to be strong enough "that a wooden elephant could stand on them". These toys were sold under the Jumbo brand name. This was the birth of the elephant brand.

After the Second World War, production was difficult and imports had ceased. Hausemann & Hotte began to have their own games made by local manufacturers with readily available sturdy cardboard. The elephant as a symbol of the products’ strength continued to be used.

In 1950 Hausemann & Hotte created De Netherlandse Spellenfabriek B.V. (NSF for short), their own cardboard factory, in order to break their dependence on other manufacturers and assure optimum quality. As the decade progressed, the firm introduced the game Electro, puzzles, and the classic board game Stratego, which was launched in America, with great success. It was made in America under license for Hausemann & Hotte by Milton Bradley.

This American link continued when Hausemann & Hotte brought the Barbie doll to the Netherlands.

From 1967, as the market for games was experiencing massive growth, Hausemann & Hotte ceased all imports and concentrated exclusively on its own brand, Jumbo. After this time both warehouse and production relocated to Wognum. That same year, with the introduction of television advertising in the Netherlands, the company used the slogan "meer dan "honderd spelen" voor iedere lijftijd" (over "a hundred games" for every age).

In 1980 Jan van Haasteren started drawing jigsaw puzzles for Jumbo. Forty percent of all puzzles made by Jumbo are now Jan van Haasteren puzzles. In 1997 the quirky Wasgij jigsaw puzzle was introduced. Wasgij is jigsaw spelled backward. Wasgij is drawn by a group of artists including Graham Thompson, who has been producing puzzles for Jumbo for many years.

== Games produced ==
Jumbo Games’ adult portfolio consists of Wasgij jigsaw puzzles, Falcon de luxe, Jan van Haasteren, Things we Love to Hate, Coronation Street, Carry On, Targui, City, and many more.

The Children's puzzles and games licenses consist of Peppa Pig, Everything's Rosie, the Little Kingdom, Fireman Sam, Disney, and many more.
