= Brighton and Hove city centre =

Area of Brighton and Hove, England

Coordinates: 50°49′19″N 0°08′13″W

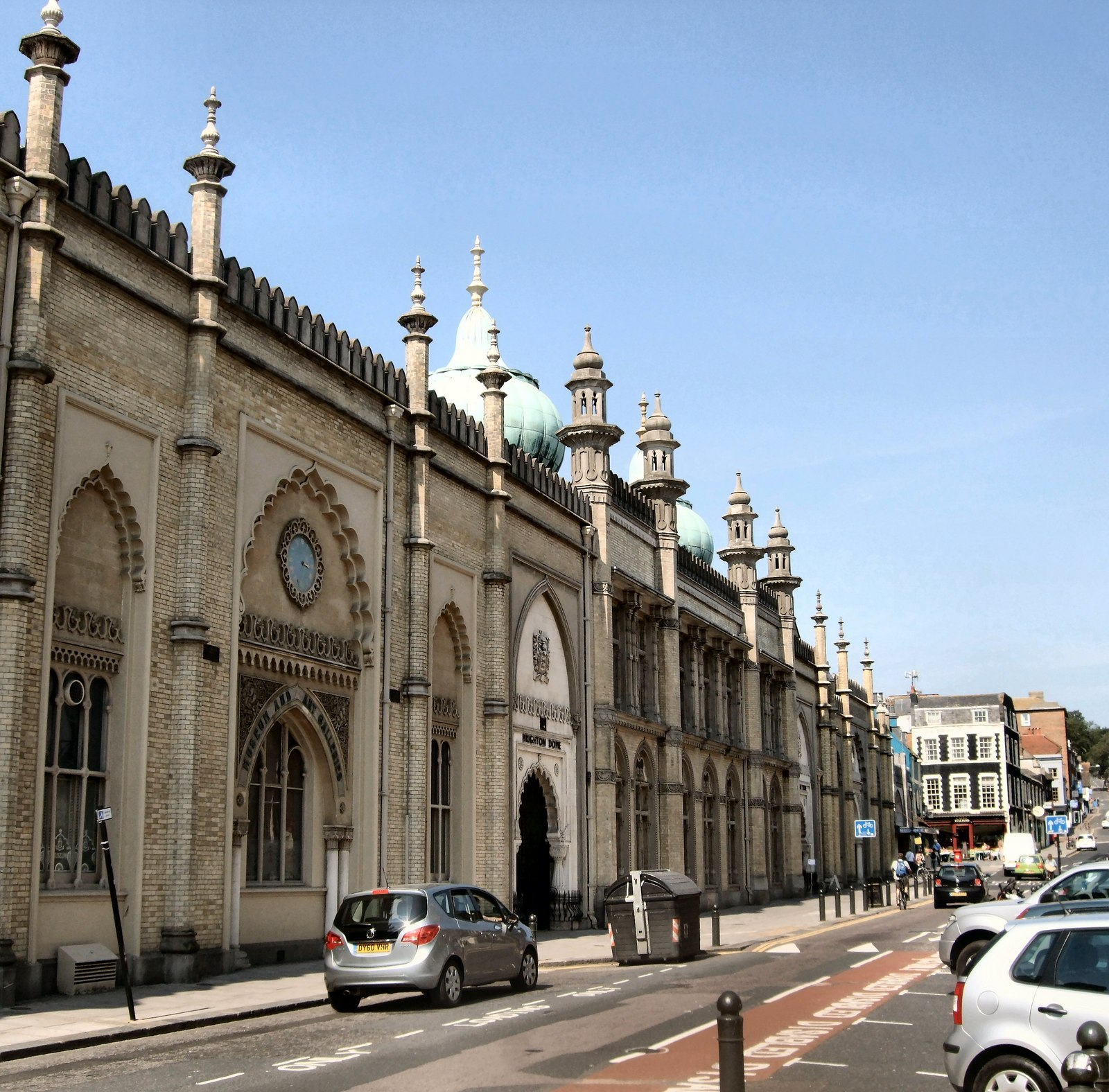
- The Brighton Dome
- Unitary authority: Brighton and Hove
- Ceremonial county: East Sussex
- Region: South East
- Country: England
- Sovereign state: United Kingdom
- Post town: BRIGHTON
- Postcode district: BN1
- Dialling code: 01273
- Police: Sussex
- Fire: East Sussex
- Ambulance: South East Coast

Brighton and Hove city centre is the commercial and cultural centre of the city of Brighton and Hove. Geographically, the so-called city centre is located in an easterly part of the Brighton and Hove urban conurbation.

== Culture ==
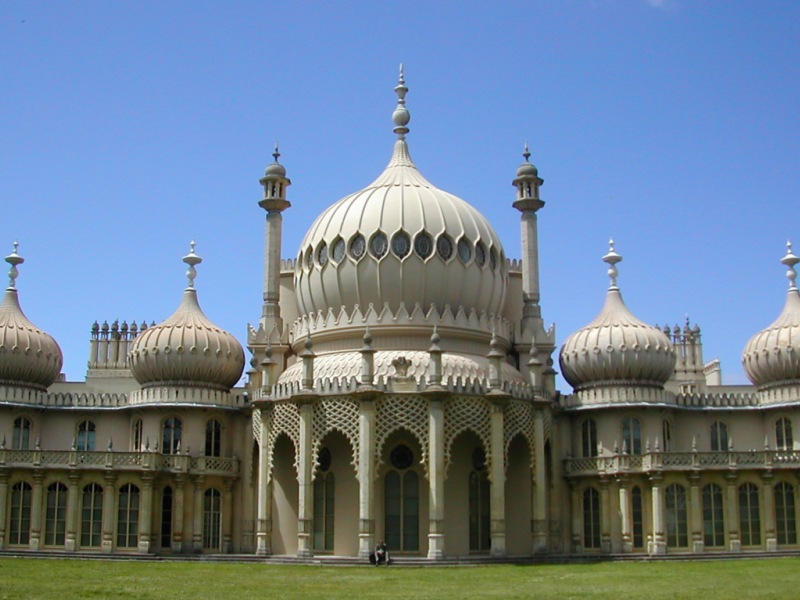
The Royal Pavilion

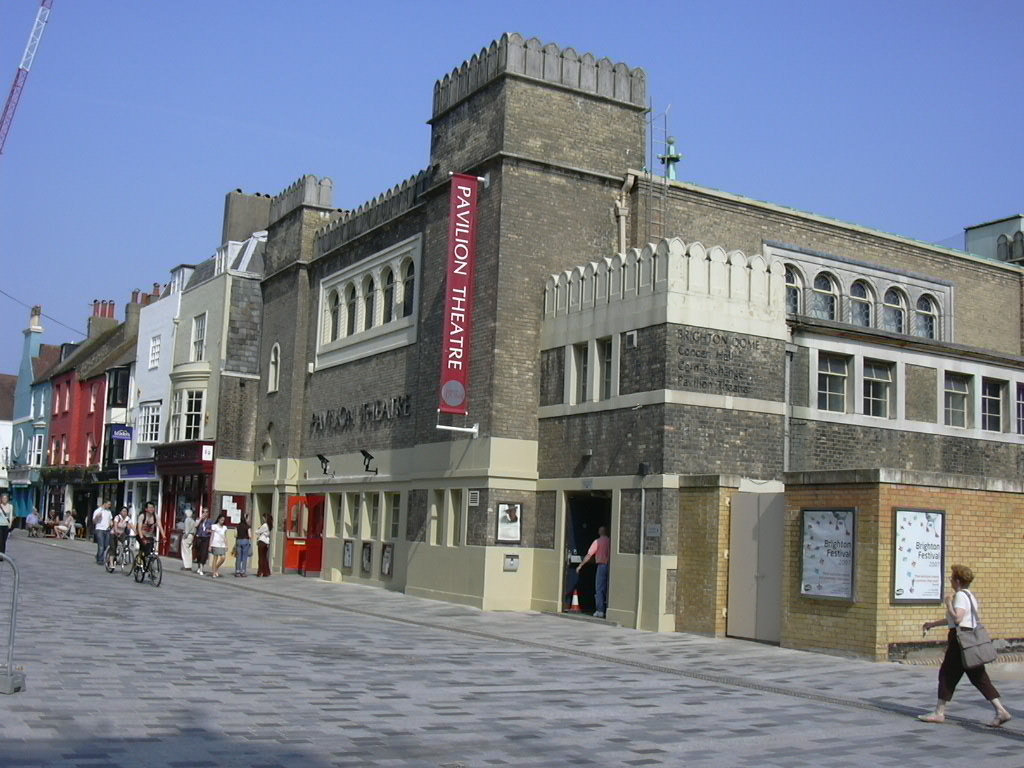
The Pavilion Theatre

The North Laine area has a network of streets dubbed the 'Cultural Quarter', so called because of its concentration of theatres, galleries and small venues. This area covers New Road, the location of the Theatre Royal, and the Brighton Dome complex which includes the Pavilion Theatre, Corn Exchange Theatre and the Dome Concert Hall. Next to this is Brighton Museum and Art Gallery. Bordering New Road and the Dome is Pavilion Gardens which is home to the Royal Pavilion, former palace residence of King George IV. Opposite New Road is Jubilee Street, a modern redevelopment containing restaurant and cafe chains. It is also the location of the Jubilee Library, the city's central library.

On the seafront is the Fishing Museum and near Brighton railway station is the Brighton Toy and Model Museum. Old Steine Gardens and St. Peter's area is a large patch of green in the city centre which is the location of a war memorial, the neo-Gothic St. Peter's Church and art galleries: the Phoenix Gallery and the University of Brighton gallery.

== Shopping ==
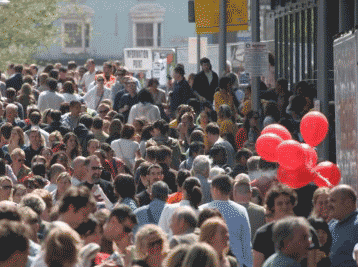
Weekend shoppers flock to the city centre during the day.

Brighton is home to hundreds of shops, including a wealth of independent shops. Most of the chain stores can be found on Western Road and Churchill Square. Other major high streets include: West Street, Queens Road, North Street, East Street, Duke Street and Ship Street.

The Lanes are the centre of Brighton's old town and consist of narrow streets and alleyways. The area is home to many jewellery and antique shops.

North of the Lanes is the North Laine, both a residential and major commercial area, and the location of most of the city's independent shops. The commercial area of North Laine is centred on Trafalgar Street, Sydney Street, Gloucester Road, Kensington Gardens, North Road, Gardner Street, Church Street and Bond Street. The area is also home to small art galleries and Komedia, a theatre, bar, comedy venue and cinema. The area is also home to Jubilee Square, home of Jubilee library and a number of restaurants.

Further east of the main high streets is Kemptown, home to many gay shops and other businesses. Its main shopping thoroughfare is St. James' Street, which has many cafés and restaurants.

== Amusements ==
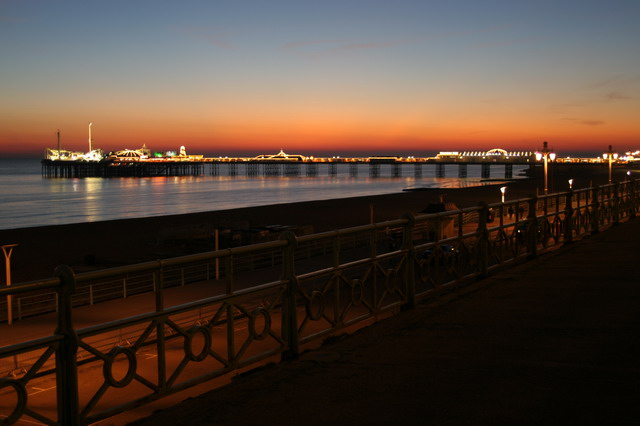
Brighton Pier at sunset (November 2006)

Brighton Palace Pier is home to many rides and other amusements such as fortune tellers and prize winning games. Near the pier is Sea Life Brighton, an aquarium. Near the aquarium is Volk's Electric Railway, a historic electric railway, providing transport to Brighton Marina. West Street is the city's centre for nightlife as home to a number of night clubs and late-night bars.

== Transport ==
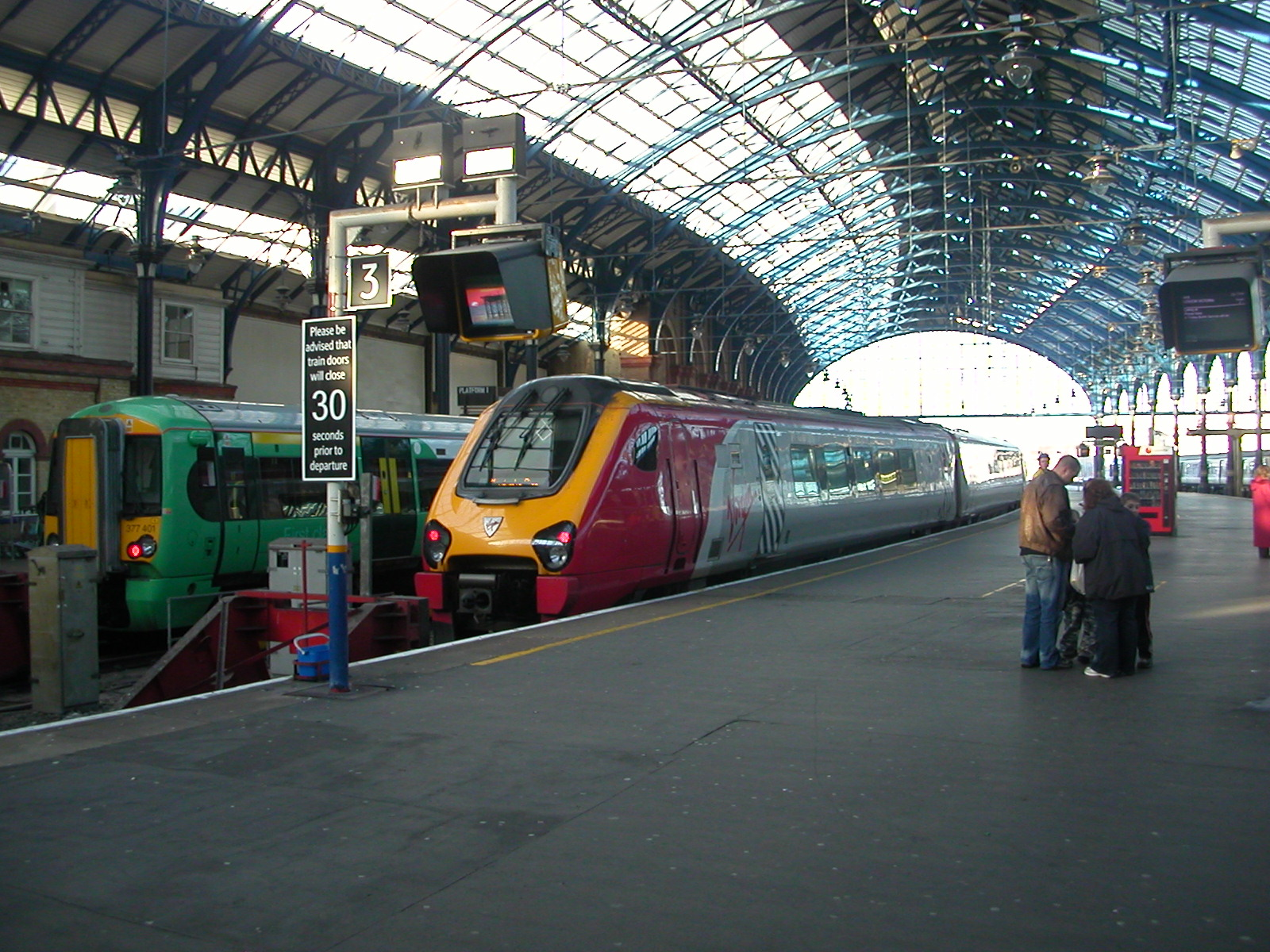
Brighton railway station

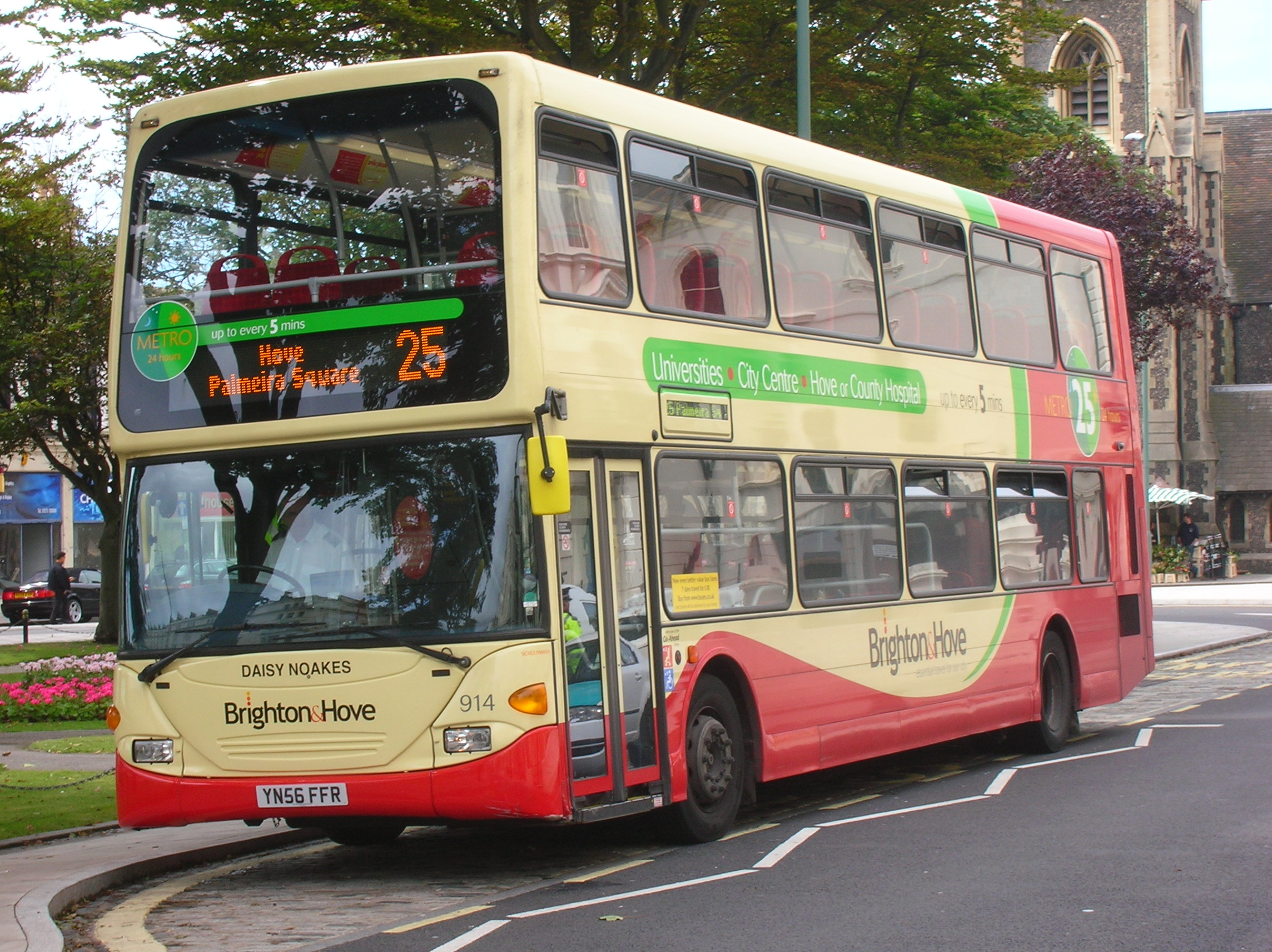
Brighton and Hove Buses run regularly throughout the city centre

The city centre is well served by public transport. Brighton and Hove Buses run regularly throughout the area with stops and stations at Churchill Square, Brighton Station, the Clock Tower, North Street and the Old Steine. Buses serve as the main mode of public transport in Brighton and Hove connecting all suburbs and outer areas to the city centre.

There are major taxi ranks located in Brighton Station and East Street.

Near the Old Steine is Pool Valley Coach Station which is used for intercity travel.

Brighton Railway station serves as the city's main rail terminus and has good links to London, Gatwick Airport and the south coast. Hove railway station serves the centre of Hove and can be reached from Brighton in less than five minutes. London Road railway station is near Preston Circus. The rail network in Brighton and Hove is not as extensive as the bus network, however certain suburbs and university campus are well connected to the centre of Brighton and Hove by rail.

Councillors called for a car-free city centre plan.

== Accommodation ==
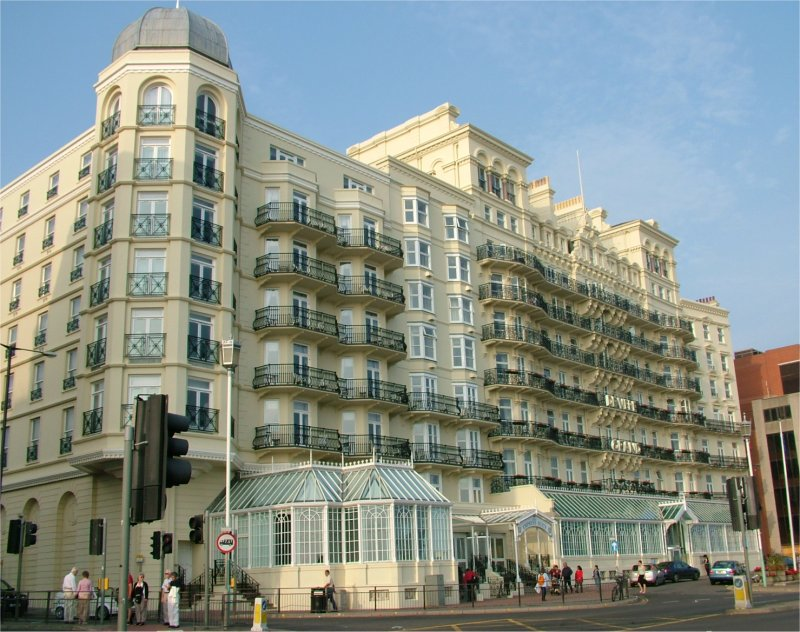
The Grand Hotel, Brighton (January 2006)

There are numerous hotels in the city centre, some of the more notable ones include The Grand, the Hilton Metropole, the Royal Albion and the Ramada.

== See also ==
- Brighton
- Hove
- Brighton and Hove
