= City: Magazine International =

Former French lifestyle magazine

City: Magazine International was a French bimonthly lifestyle magazine published in Paris from 1984 to 1991.
