= Fabrizio Chiti =

Italian biochemist

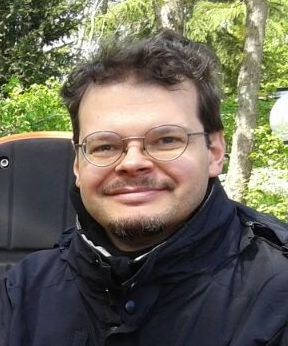
- Fabrizio Chiti in 2015
- Born: 7 July 1971 (age 55); Florence, Italy
- Education: Biological Sciences, University of Florence, Italy(E.N.S., 1995)
- Known for: Protein aggregation and amyloid
- Awards: Jean-Francois LeFèvre Lecture at the Ecole Supérieure de Biotechnologie de Strasbourg (ESBS) (2003); Member of the Academia Europaea (2015); EMBO Young Investigator (2005); Roncaglia-Mari Award, Accademia Nazionale dei Lincei(2010)
- Scientific career
- Fields: Biophysics, Biochemistry
- Workplaces: Department of Experimental and Clinical Biomedical Sciences, University of Florence
- Doctoral advisor: Chris Dobson
- Other academic advisors: Giampietro Ramponi, Chris Dobson
- Website: www.sbsc.unifi.it/vp-209-gruppo-chiti.html

Fabrizio Chiti (born in Florence, 7 July 1971) is an Italian biochemist noted for his work on Protein aggregation and amyloid.

== Education ==
Chiti is a graduate in Biological Sciences of the University of Florence (Italy). He attained a PhD degree (D.Phil) in Chemistry in 2000 at the University of Oxford in UK. He then worked as a postdoctoral researcher at the University of Florence, Italy, with Giampietro Ramponi as a supervisor (2000–2002) and at the University of Cambridge, UK, under the supervision of Chris Dobson (2002).

== Research and career ==
He was appointed as an Associate (2002) and then Full Professor (2010) at the University of Florence in Biochemistry. Chiti provided contributions in the field of misfolding and aggregation, particularly in the field of amyloid He rationalized how amino acid mutations induce protein aggregation and edited an equation to predict the effect of mutations on the aggregation of an unfolded protein, which led to a search by many investigators of algorithms with predictive power on essential aspects of protein aggregation. He also correlated the toxicities of abnormal protein oligomers with specific structural properties of them. His 2006 review with Chris Dobson on protein misfolding, amyloid formation and human disease, later updated as a new report, is a reference paper in the field of amyloid and received, as of October 2019, more than four thousands citations in scientific publications.

== Awards and honors ==
- Election to EMBO Young Investigator program, European Molecular Biology Organization, 2005
- Election to member of Academia Europaea, 2015
- Jean-Francois LeFèvre Lecture, École supérieure de biotechnologie Strasbourg, 2003
- Maria Teresa Messori Roncaglia ed Eugenio Mari Award, Accademia Nazionale dei Lincei, 2010
