= City (journal) =

- Language: English
- Edited by: Bob Catterall

Publication details
- History: 1996–present
- Publisher: Taylor & Francis
- Frequency: Bimonthly

Standard abbreviations
- ISO 4: City

Indexing
- ISSN: 1360-4813 (print); 1470-3629 (web)
- OCLC no.: 45107157

Links
- Journal homepage; Online access; Online archive; Home page at Taylor & Francis

City: analysis of urban change, theory, action is a peer-reviewed academic journal that publishes research, analysis, and commentary relating to cities, their futures, and urbanization. The journal was established in 1996 by founding editor Bob Catterall. It was relaunched in 2019 The journal is published by Taylor & Francis and its editors are Anna Richter, David Madden, Hanna Baumann, Lindsay Sawyer, Paroj Banerjee, Tatiana Acevedo-Guerrero, Ulises Moreno-Tabarez and Yimin Zhao. The journal's founding editor is Bob Catterall.

City has recently launched a new section of the journal scenes, sounds, action with an open call for short, creative and accessible submissions as part of City's commitment to the value of non-academic voices and audiences. The editor of this section is Debbie Humphry.

== Abstracting and indexing ==
The journal is abstracted and indexed in:

- Cambridge Scientific Abstracts
- Science Abstracts, Linguistics and Language Behaviour Abstracts)
- Current Abstracts
- Dietrich's Index Philosophicus
- EBSCOhost (including Academic Search Alumni Edition, Academic Search Complete, Academic Search Premier, Environment Complete, TOC Premier)
- Environment Index
- Ingenta
- IBZ- Internationale Bibliographie der Geistes- und Sozialwissenschaftlichen Zeitschriftenliteratur
- International Bibliography of the Social Sciences
- Internationale Bibliographie der Rezensionen Geistes- und Sozialwissenschaftlicher Literatur
- OCLC Electronic Collections Online
- Scopus
- Swets Information Services.
