= The City (Koontz novel) =

2014 novel by Dean Koontz

- Paperback front cover
- Author: Dean Koontz
- Language: English
- Genre: Thriller, mystery, suspense
- Publisher: Bantam Books
- Publication date: July 1, 2014
- Publication place: United States
- Media type: Print (hardback, paperback), e-book, audiobook
- Pages: 416
- ISBN: 978-0345545930

The City is a horror novel by American author Dean Koontz, first published in 2014. The book blends suspense, mystery, and supernatural elements, telling the story of Jonah Kirk, a musical prodigy, and his life experiences in a changing world.

== Plot ==
The City is set against the backdrop of New York City, portrayed as an anthropomorphic character. The narrative follows Jonah Kirk from his childhood into adulthood, focusing on significant events that shape his life and those around him. The story addresses profound questions about fate, free will, the essence of a city, and the boundaries of love and forgiveness. The protagonist, Jonah Kirk, tells the story in a first-person narrative, looking back at his life starting when he was eight years old. The book introduces readers to Jonah's complex family dynamics, his early recognition as a musical prodigy, and his encounters with various characters that deeply influence his life.

== Characters ==
- Jonah Kirk: The central character, a musical prodigy whose life and moral compass are central to the narrative.
- Sylvia: Jonah's mother, an accomplished vocalist and nightclub singer.
- Teddy: Jonah's grandfather, a piano player who plays a significant role in Jonah's upbringing.
- Pearl: A mysterious woman who claims to be the city and imparts crucial knowledge to Jonah about his abilities and future.
- Other characters, including Mr. Yoshioka, Malcolm, and Amalia, contribute significantly to the story, each playing a unique role in Jonah's life and the unfolding events.

== Publication ==
The book was published on July 1, 2014, by Bantam Books, and available in hardcover, paperback, e-book, and audiobook formats. It includes a bonus short story titled "The Neighbor", also by Dean Koontz.

== Reception ==
The City received mixed reviews, with some critics praising its writing style and setting, while others critiqued the narrative and certain aspects of the characters. Kirkus Reviews criticized the "cardboard cut-out antagonists" and predictable action, while praising its setting, describing the book as "passable". John M. Wills of the New York Review of Books wrote that "above all else it is a wonderful trip back in time when life was simpler and children were largely innocent." Publishers Weekly gave the book a mostly negative review, writing that it "offers airy optimistic passages that won't persuade anyone acquainted with the harder side of life to always look on the bright side of it."
