= Centre City Tower =

Centre City Tower or Center City Tower may refer to three buildings:

- Centre City Tower (Birmingham), United Kingdom
- Center City Tower (Philadelphia), United States
- Centre City Tower (Pittsburgh), United States

== See also ==
- Tower City Center
- Centre City Building (Dayton, Ohio)
