= City Centre Mall, Sambalpur =

City Centre Mall
- Location: fram road modipada, Sambalpur, Odisha, India
- Coordinates: 20.27°N 85.84°E
- Opened: 2012
- Developer: Sambalpur Municipal Corporation
- Num. of stores: 50
- Floor area: 100,000 sq ft (9,300 m^{2})
- Floors: G+4
- Parking: Basement
- Website: citycentresambalpur.com

City Centre Mall is a five-storied shopping mall complex located at Sambalpur in the state of Odisha, India.

== Background ==
The mall is spread over a floor area of a hundred thousand square feet. It was publicly opened in 2012. The mall is developed and maintained by the Sambalpur Municipal Corporation. It contains approximately fifty outlets, including cafeterias, food courts, restaurants, multiplex, parking space and a hypermarket.

== See also ==
- Sambalpur
