= Chithi =

Chithi (Tamil: சித்தி) means mother's younger sister, or father's younger brother's wife, or father's second wife in Tamil. In Indian English, it may refer to aunty (friendly older woman)

Chithi, Chitthi, or variation, may also refer to:

- Chithi (TV series) (Tamil: சித்தி), a 1999 Tamil television series on Sun TV
- Chithi 2 (Tamil: சித்தி-2), a 2020 Tamil reboot of the 1999 series
- Chitthi (Tamil: சித்தி), a 1966 Tamil language film

== See also ==
- The dictionary definition of சித்தி at Wiktionary
- Chitti (disambiguation)
- Chiti (disambiguation)
- Citti (surname)
