= Centre City Mall, Dunedin =

Centre City Mall
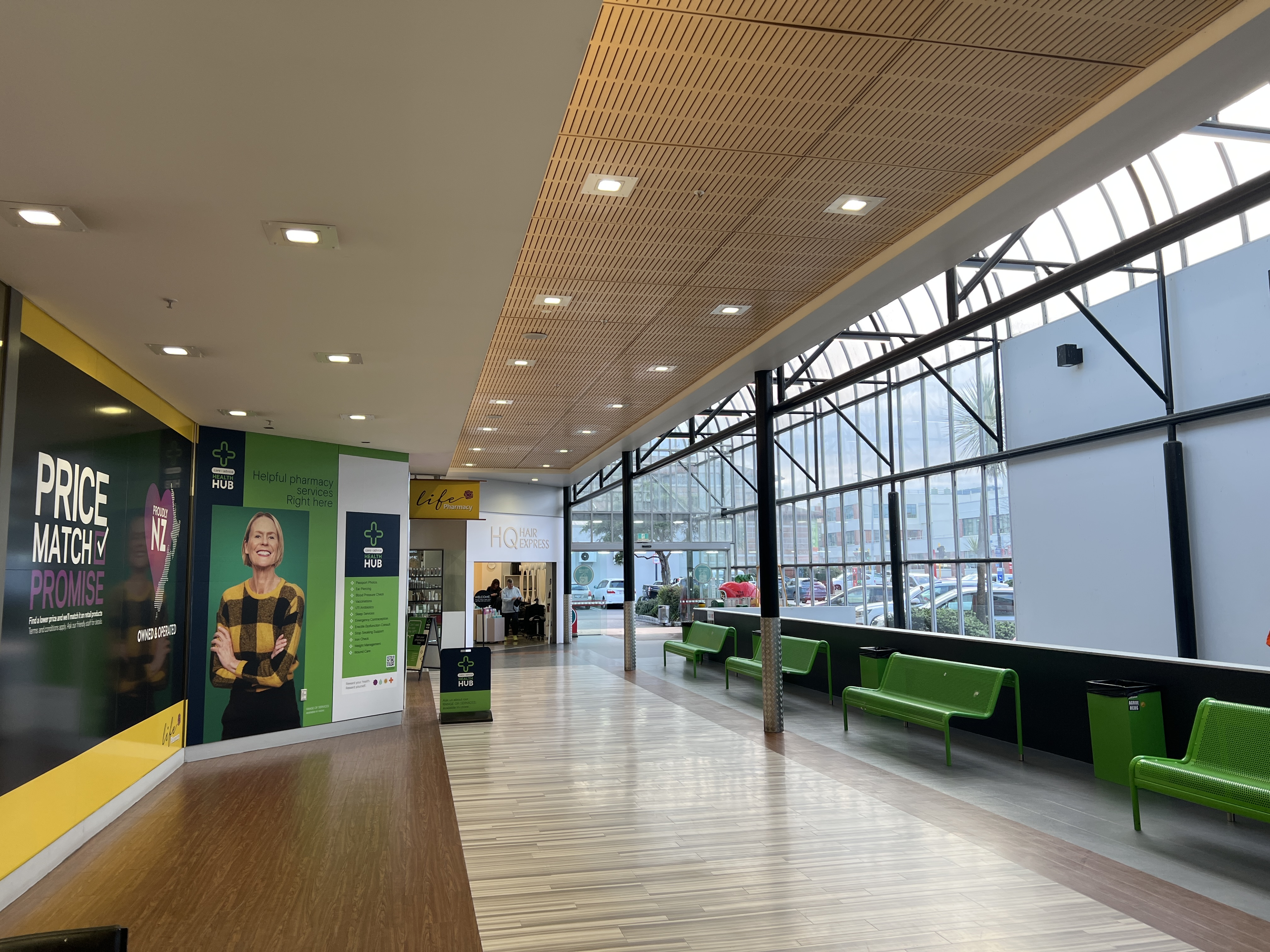
- Centre City Mall, New Zealand
- Location: Dunedin, Otago, New Zealand
- Coordinates: 45°52′16″S 170°30′28″E
- Address: 133 Great King Street
- Opened: late 1970s
- Owner: Foodstuffs South Island
- Num. of stores: 20
- Num. of anchor tenants: 1
- Floor area: 8,000 m^{2} (86,000 sq ft)
- Floors: 3 (including underground parking and supermarket offices)

The Centre City Mall is the oldest existing and second largest shopping complex in Dunedin, New Zealand. Located in the central city, it is bounded by Great King Street and Castle Street in the block between St. Andrew Street and Hanover Street, immediately to the south of Dunedin Hospital.

The mall, built in the late 1970s, contains 20 shops, with the key tenant being Dunedin's largest supermarket, Centre City New World. Other shops include several clothing retailers, chemists, a cafe, a musical instrument retailer, a health food store, craft shops, and a florist. The design of the centre (excluding New World) is roughly square and single-storeyed, with a block of shops in the centre of a corridor loop, with the other shops to the outside. The New World supermarket extends from the southeastern end of this square along Castle Street. To the north is the mall's car park, which also has a subterranean level beneath the mall itself.

A walkway, Albion Place, links Centre City with Dunedin's largest mall, the Meridian Mall.
