= Chris Dobson =

British chemist (1949–2019)

Sir Chris Dobson FRS FMedSci FRSC
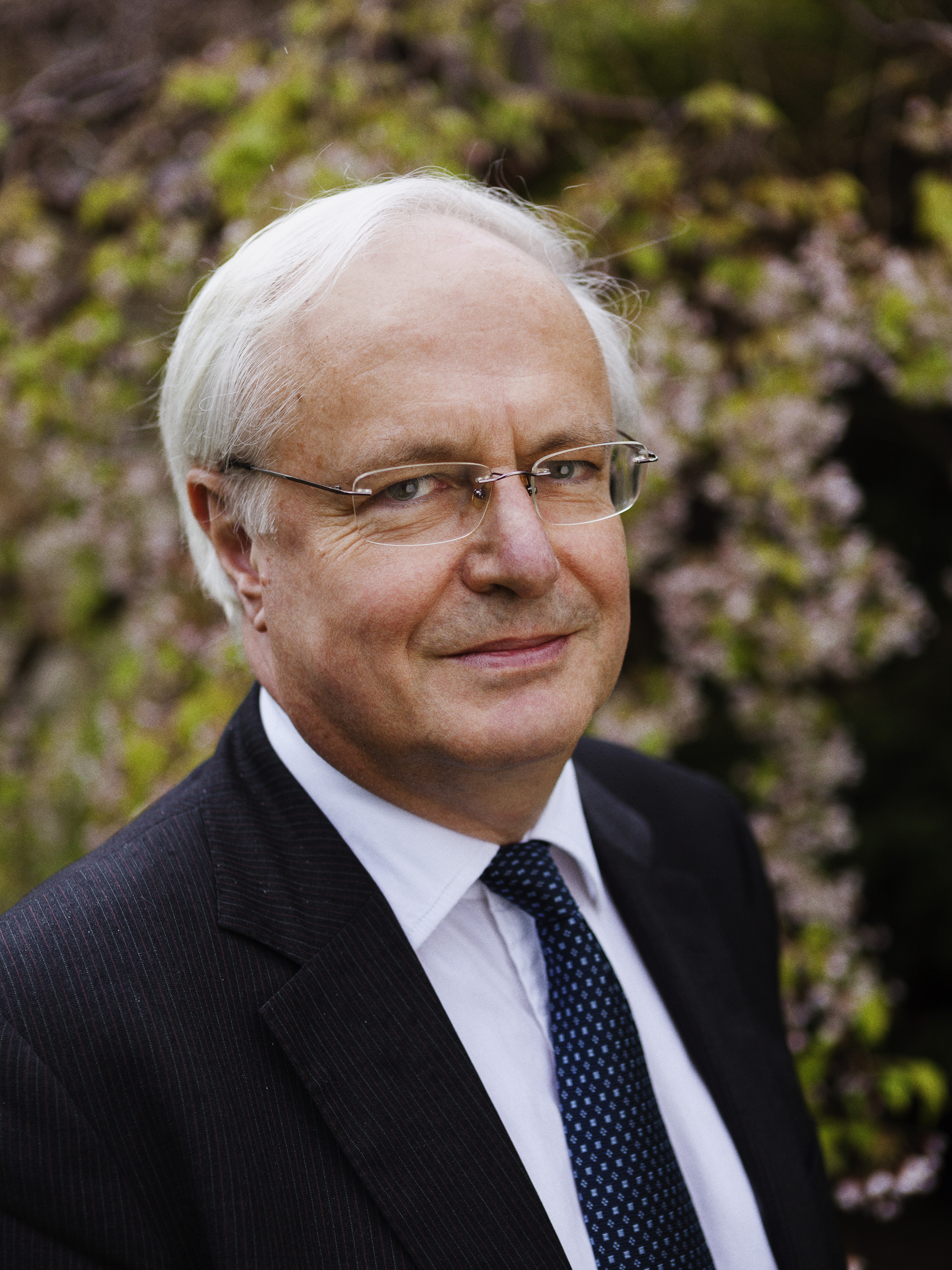
- Dobson in 2014
- Born: Christopher Martin Dobson; 8 October 1949; Rinteln, Lower Saxony, West Germany
- Died: 8 September 2019 (aged 69); Sutton, London, England
- Education: Hereford Cathedral Junior School; Abingdon School
- Alma mater: University of Oxford (MA, DPhil)
- Awards: Corday–Morgan Prize (1981); EMBO Member (1999); Davy Medal (2005); Royal Medal (2009); Heineken Prize (2014); Knight Bachelor (2018)
- Scientific career
- Fields: Chemistry; Biophysics; Protein folding
- Workplaces: St John's College, Cambridge; University of Cambridge; Harvard University
- Thesis: The conformation of lysozyme in solution (1975)
- Website: www.ch.cam.ac.uk/person/cmd44

Sir Christopher Martin Dobson (8 October 1949 – 8 September 2019) was a British chemist, who was the John Humphrey Plummer Professor of Chemical and Structural Biology in the Department of Chemistry at the University of Cambridge, and Master of St John's College, Cambridge.

== Early life and education ==
Dobson was born on 8 October 1949 in Rinteln, Germany, where his father, Arthur Dobson was commissioned as an officer. Both Arthur Dobson and Christopher Dobson's mother, Mabel Dobson (née Pollard), were originally from Bradford in Yorkshire and had left school at age 14. Dobson had two older siblings, Graham and Gillian. Due to his father's postings, Dobson also lived in Lagos, Nigeria.

Christopher Dobson was educated at Hereford Cathedral Junior School, and then Abingdon School from 1960 until 1967. He completed a Master of Arts and Doctor of Philosophy at the University of Oxford, where he was a student of Keble College, Oxford and Merton College, Oxford.

== Research and career ==
Dobson's research largely focused on protein folding and protein misfolding, and its association with medical disorders particularly Alzheimer's disease and Parkinson's disease. By applying chemical and biophysical techniques, Dobson investigated links between protein structure, function, and disease.

He is well known for his serendipitous discovery that ordinary proteins can misfold and aggregate to form amyloid structures.

"A postdoc who left his sample of an unfolded protein in an NMR [nuclear magnetic resonance] spectrometer over a long weekend discovered, on his return, that it had turned into a gel. We were curious about this phenomenon and found that the NMR tube was full of amyloid fibrils that we then thought were associated only with diseases".

— Christopher M. Dobson,

Dobson authored and co-authored over 800 papers and review articles, including 38 in Nature, Science and Cell, which have been cited over 100,000 times. As of 2019 his H-index is 153.

Dobson held research fellowships at Merton College, Oxford and then Linacre College, Oxford before working at Harvard University. He returned to Oxford in 1980 as a Fellow of Lady Margaret Hall, Oxford and as a University Lecturer in Chemistry, later receiving promotions to Reader, then Professor of Chemistry in 1996.

Dobson moved to the University of Cambridge in 2001 as the John Humphrey Plummer Professor of Chemical and Structural Biology. In 2007, he became the Master of St John's College, Cambridge, a post which he held until his death in September 2019.

In 2012, Dobson founded the Cambridge Centre for Misfolding Diseases, which is currently based in the Chemistry of Health building at the Department of Chemistry at the University of Cambridge.

In 2016, Chris Dobson co-founded Wren Therapeutics, a biotechnology start-up company whose mission is to find new therapeutics for Alzheimer's disease.

=== Awards and honours ===
Dobson was knighted in the 2018 Queen's Birthday Honours for his contributions to science and higher education. In 2009, Dobson was awarded the Royal Medal by the Royal Society "for his outstanding contributions to the understanding of the mechanisms of protein folding and mis-folding, and the implications for disease", and in 2014 he received both the Heineken Prize for Biochemistry and Biophysics and the Feltrinelli International Prize for Medicine. Dobson was elected a Fellow of the Royal Society (FRS) in 1996. His nomination reads:

Dobson is distinguished for his studies, principally using NMR methods, of the structures and dynamics of proteins in solution. Such studies include those on lysozyme, with which he demonstrated many methodological advances, interleukin-4, with which he established for the first time the topology of the important family of haemopoietic helical cytokines, and urokinase-type plasminogen activator, with which he elucidated the dynamic characteristics of multidomain fibrinolytic proteins, Dobson is a pioneer in the application of NMR methods to the problem of protein folding, which is now the major theme of his work. His studies on lysozyme are resulting in one of the most detailed descriptions of a folding pathway for a protein. Dobson has explored the properties and reactions of molecules in solids by means of NMR spectroscopy, including proteins, organometallic compounds, inorganic paramagnets and the silicaceous components of hydraulic materials. Notable here are analyses of the nature and origin of dynamic properties in molecular solids, and their relationship to structure and reactivity.

Dobson's other accolades include:

- Corday-Morgan Medal and Prize, The Royal Society of Chemistry, 1981
- Howard Hughes Medical Institute International Research Scholar, 1992
- Brunauer Award, American Ceramic Society, 1996
- Elected a Fellow of the Royal Society (FRS) in 1996
- Dewey and Kelly Award, University of Nebraska–Lincoln, 1997
- National Lecturer, American Biophysical Society, 1998
- Member of the European Molecular Biology Organisation (EMBO) 1999
- Interdisciplinary Award, The Royal Society of Chemistry, 1999
- Doctor Honoris Causa, University of Leuven, Belgium, 2001
- Presidential Visiting Scholar, University of California San Francisco, 2001
- Bijvoet Medal, Bijvoet Center for Biomolecular Research, University of Utrecht, The Netherlands, 2002
- Silver Medal, Italian Society of Biochemistry, 2002
- Royal Society Bakerian Lecturer, 2003
- Stein and Moore Award, The Protein Society, 2003
- Honorary Member, National Magnetic Resonance Society of India, 2004
- Elected a Fellow of the Academy of Medical Sciences (FMedSci) in 2005
- Honorary Doctor of Medicine, Umea University, Sweden, 2005
- Davy Medal, The Royal Society, 2005
- Hans Neurath Award, The Protein Society, 2006
- Honorary Doctor of Medicine, University of Florence, Italy, 2006
- Doctor Honoris Causa, University of Liège, Belgium, 2007
- Sammet Guest Professor, Johann Wolfgang Goethe University, Frankfurt, 2007
- Foreign Honorary Member of the American Academy of Arts and Sciences, 2007
- Fellow of the International Society of Magnetic Resonance, 2008
- Honorary Fellow, Linacre College, University of Oxford, 2008
- Honorary Fellow, Lady Margaret Hall, University of Oxford, 2008
- Honorary Fellow, Merton College, University of Oxford, 2009
- Honorary Fellow, Keble College, University of Oxford, 2009
- Royal Medal, The Royal Society, 2009
- Honorary Fellow of the Chemical Council of India, 2010
- Khorana Award, The Royal Society of Chemistry, 2010
- Honorary Doctorate of Science, King's College London, 2012
- Honorary Fellow, Trinity College Dublin, 2013
- Foreign Associate of the US National Academy of Sciences, 2013
- Honorary Fellow, Darwin College, University of Cambridge, 2014
- Dr. H.P. Heineken Prize for Biochemistry and Biophysics, Royal Netherlands Academy of Arts and Sciences (KNAW), 2014
- Antonio Feltrinelli International Prize for Medicine, Accademia Nazionale dei Lincei, Rome, 2014
- Member of the American Philosophical Society, 2018

=== Mentorship ===
Dobson mentored and supervised many notable PhD students and post-doctoral researchers, many of whom became renowned experts in their own field. These include:

- Carol V. Robinson at the University of Oxford
- Sheena E. Radford at the University of Leeds
- Cait MacPhee at the University of Edinburgh
- Clare Grey at the University of Cambridge
- Brenda A. Schulman at the Max Planck Institute of Biochemistry in Germany
- Michele Vendruscolo at the University of Cambridge
- Fabrizio Chiti at the University of Florence
- Andrew Baldwin at the University of Oxford

== Personal life ==
Dobson met his wife, Dr Mary Dobson (née Schove) at Merton College at the University of Oxford. They had two sons, Richard and William.

He died on 8 September 2019, from cancer, at Royal Marsden Hospital in Sutton, near Surrey.

Academic offices
Preceded by Richard Perham	Master of St John's College, Cambridge; 2007–2019	Succeeded by Heather Hancock
