= Citti =

Citti is a surname.

Notable people with the surname include:

== People ==
- Christine Citti (born 1962), French actress
- Franco Citti (1935–2016), Italian actor
- Sergio Citti (1933–2005), Italian film director and screenwriter

== Fictional characters ==
- Sandra Citti, a character from the 1963 Soviet Russian-language science fiction novel Razor's Edge by Ivan Yefremov

== See also ==
- Citi (disambiguation)
- Chiti (disambiguation)
- Chitti (disambiguation)
- Chithi (disambiguation)
