= Chitti =

Chitti is a short name for some Indians. It may refer to:

- Chitti Babu (Tamil actor), Indian comedian, presenter and actor.
- Chitti (character), main character in Enthiran (2010) and 2.0 (2018).
- Chitti Babu (musician), Indian classical musician
- Chitti Tammudu, 1962 Telugu film
- Chitti, 1995 Sinhala film

== See also ==
- The dictionary definition of சித்தி at Wiktionary
- Chithi (disambiguation)
- Chiti (disambiguation)
- Citti (surname)
