= Center City High School =

Coordinates: 33°7′10″N 117°4′54″W

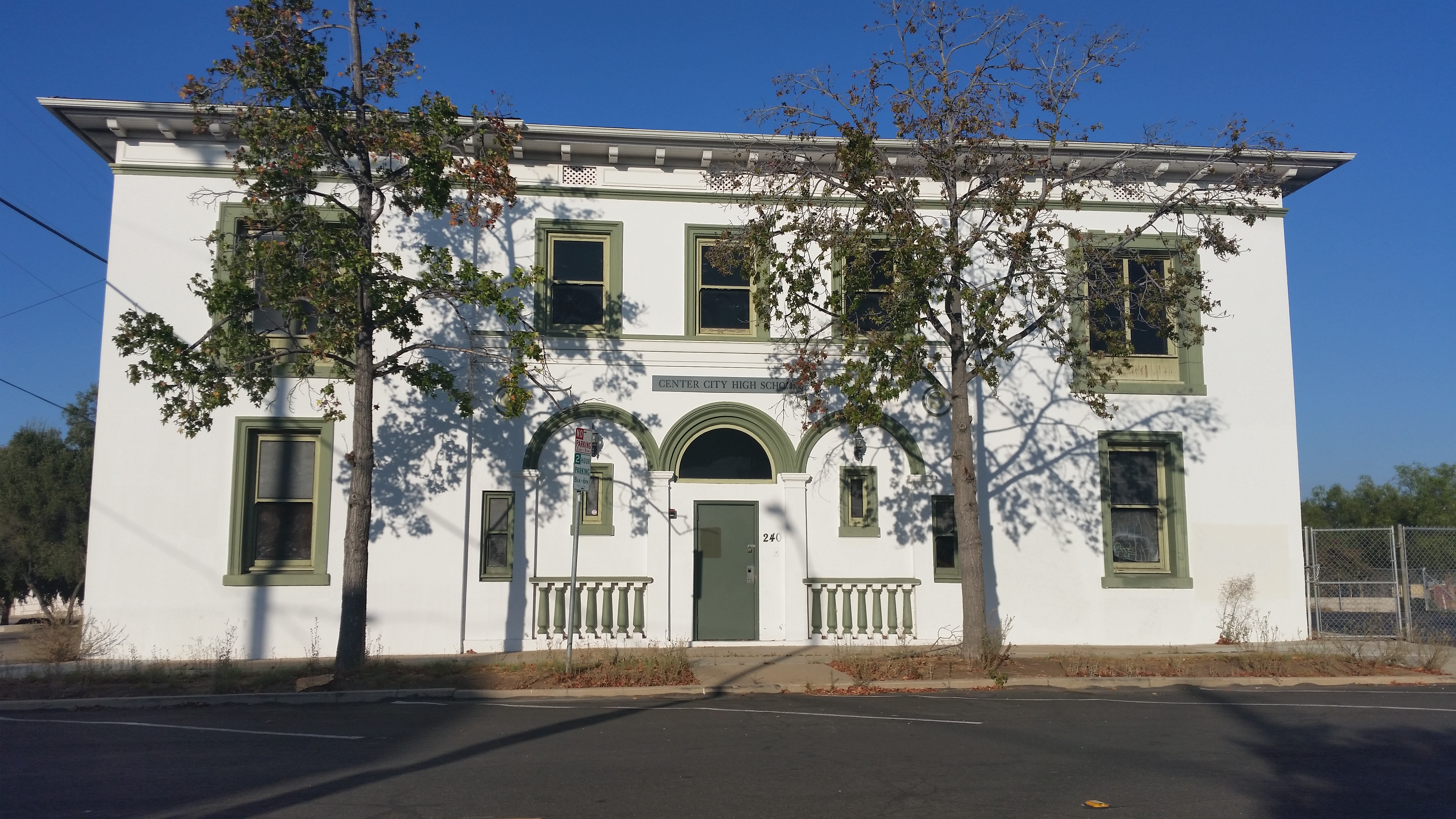
- Exterior of the closed high school in 2017
- Escondido, California; United States

Information
- School type: Public, high school
- Established: 1989
- Closed: 2009
- School district: Escondido Union High School District

Center City High School was an accredited alternative high school in Escondido, California, part of the Escondido Union High School District. Center City's mode of instruction was independent study, which is an instructional strategy that responds to students' needs and styles of learning. The school closed in 2009 and was replaced by independent learning centers at the district's other high schools (Escondido, Orange Glen and San Pasqual).

In 2016, John Paul the Great Catholic University purchased the property and plans to renovate it to become their campus chapel in 2025.

== See also ==
- Escondido Union High School District
