= City Centre Mall, Shimoga =

City Centre Mall
- Location: Shimoga, Karnataka, India
- Opened: April 2014
- Developer: EKK Group
- Architect: KSRTC
- Floor area: 85,000 sq ft (7,900 m^{2})
- Floors: 3
- Website: cityshimoga.com

City Centre Mall (also known as Shimoga Bus Terminal Mall) is a shopping mall located in Shimoga, Karnataka, and is the city's first shopping mall. It was developed by UAE based EKK Group, and is attached to the KSRTC bus station.

== About EKK Group ==
UAE based EKK Group is a AED185 million enterprise founded by E.K. Kader Hajee. Currently led by Mohamed Sohel E.K., EKK Group has business activities in Dubai, Sharjah, Ajman, Mumbai, Karnataka and Kerala and is involved in varied industries including retail chains, hospitality, restaurants and real estate.

== See also ==
- List of shopping malls in India
