= City (board game) =

Board game

First edition box cover, German language version, 1988

City is a board game published in 1988 by Jumbo Games.

== Contents ==
City is a game for 2–6 players in which each player buys shops and then gains profits as other players visit the shops.

=== Components ===
The game box holds:

- A game board showing an overhead view of a city's shopping district.
- a special die
- Each player has
  - 6 “customer” pawns (one black, 2 blue, 3 brown)
  - a "thief" pawn (red)
  - a marker and 12 tokens in the player's color

=== Gameplay ===
Players spend the first phase of the game taking possession of shops. In the second phase, players move one of their pawns each turn using the special die. If it ends up in front of a shop owned by another player, the shop owner makes money. If the thief ends up in front of another player's shop, the shop owner loses money. Players can spend money to enhance shops that they own, increasing their profits when shoppers arrive.

=== Victory conditions ===
Players track profits and losses on a "Ladder of Success". The first player to reach the top of the Ladder wins the game.

== Publication history ==
City was designed by Wolfgang Kramer and Andreas Spottog and was published in Germany by Jumbo Games in 1988. This was followed by a second edition with multilingual rules.

Almost twenty years later, Kramer redeveloped the game and set it in the fantasy city of Altura. The new game was published in 2007 as Der Markt von Alturien (The Market of Alturien) by Pro Ludo in Europe, and by Mayfair Games in North America. Kramer would go on to develop another board game set in Altura, Alcazar, in 2009.

== Reception ==
In Issue 6 of the British games magazine Games International, Brian Walker stated that "City fulfils much of the criteria required for a successful game; the luck element is a long way removed from the roll a dice and hope for the best school; the player interaction is strong and there is plenty of opportunity both for planning and decisions of an altogether more vindictive nature." Walker concluded by giving the game an average rating of 3 out of 5.

In Issue 59 of the French games magazine Jeux & Stratégie, Dominique Guyot liked the range of possible choices each turn — "blocking of pawns, choice of pawn to move, expansion or acquisition of businesses." Guyot also found the rules "simple and quick to assimilate." However, Guyot thought the rules could use some adjustments, noting, "only being able to move one pawn per turn offers very few combinations to the player who throws the die. This game would therefore certainly be more exciting if two dice were used."

Writing a retrospective review for the German game website Spielphase, Claudia Schlee and Andreas Keirat liked the game, commenting "With City, Jumbo had a nice dice game in its program, which got its appeal from the weighing up of making a purchase or upgrading of properties. The luck factor plays a rather minor role. The playing time is undemanding and the material is of high quality." They concluded that it was "A good game that can provide a varied course of events for three or more people" and gave it their highest rating, 5 out of 5.
