= Citi Centre =

Citi Centre may refer to:

- Chennai Citi Centre, Mylapore, Chennai, India; a shopping centre
- Pompano Citi Centre, Pompano Beach, Florida, USA; a shopping center

== See also ==
- city centre aka city center
- Citi (disambiguation)
- City (disambiguation)
- Center (disambiguation), including centre
- City Center (disambiguation)
