= The City (band) =

Australian band

- Genres: Alternative rock
- Years active: Late 1984 to 1987
- Label: Chrysalis Records
- Past members: Billy Trudel; Peter McIan; Stuart Mathis; Jerry Speiser; Wade Biery

The cover of "Foundation", released in 1986. This was the band's only album.

The City was active during the mid-1980s. It was formed by Peter McIan after the demise of Men at Work in 1985, using some of the same talent such as the drummer Jerry Speiser. The band were signed to British record label Chrysalis.

They released one studio album, titled Foundation, in 1986. It produced one hit song, "Planets in Motion", which was played in heavy rotation on American radio at the time, and was briefly a popular wedding song in the late 1980s. Some of their pieces appeared on MTV, but the band never toured.

The album was released in the UK in 1987.

Peter McIan died on April 24, 2025, at the age of 78.

== Personnel ==
The band consisted of several well-known session musicians of the time:

- Billy Trudel – Lead vocals (Warpipes) (Elton John)
- Peter McIan – Backing vocals, keyboards (as well as producing the album) (died 2025)
- Stuart Mathis (later associated with The Wallflowers) – Guitar
- Jerry Speiser (from Men at Work) – Drums and percussion
- Wade Biery – Bass

== Foundation track listing ==
1. "Season Of The Heart"
2. "Invisible Man"
3. "Aim For The Heart"
4. "Parallel Lines"
5. "Planets In Motion"
6. "Walk Away"
7. "From This Day On"
8. "Fatal Attraction"
9. "When The Smoke Clears"
