= List of Vocaloid products =

The following is a list of products released for the Vocaloid software in order of release date.

== Products ==
=== Vocaloid ===
Product	Developer	Language	Sex	Voice sampled	Release date
Leon	Zero-G Ltd	English	Male		January 15, 2004; March 3, 2004 (Japan)
Lola	Zero-G Ltd	English	Female		January 15, 2004; March 3, 2004 (Japan)
Miriam	Zero-G Ltd	English	Female	Miriam Stockley	July 1, 2004; July 26, 2004 (Japan)
MEIKO	Yamaha Corporation (developer); Crypton Future Media (distributor)	Japanese	Female	Meiko Haigō	November 5, 2004
KAITO	Yamaha Corporation (developer); Crypton Future Media (distributor)	Japanese	Male	Naoto Fūga	February 17, 2006

=== Vocaloid 2 ===
Product	Developer	Language	Sex	Voice sampled	Release date
Sweet Ann	PowerFX	English	Female	Jody	June 29, 2007; September 21, 2007 (Japan)
Hatsune Miku (CV01)	Crypton Future Media	Japanese	Female	Saki Fujita	August 31, 2007
Kagamine Rin & Len (CV02)	Crypton Future Media	Japanese	Female (Rin); Male (Len)	Asami Shimoda	December 27, 2007
Prima	Zero-G	English	Female		January 14, 2008; February 22, 2008 (Japan)
Kagamine Rin & Len Act 2	Crypton Future Media	Japanese	Female (Rin); Male (Len)	Asami Shimoda	July 18, 2008
Gackpoid: Camui Gackpo	Internet Co., Ltd.	Japanese	Male	Gackt	July 31, 2008
Megurine Luka (CV03)	Crypton Future Media	Japanese; English	Female	Yū Asakawa	January 30, 2009
Megpoid: GUMI	Internet Co., Ltd.	Japanese	Female	Megumi Nakajima	June 26, 2009
Sonika	Zero-G	English	Female		July 14, 2009; August 7, 2009 (Japan)
SF-A2 Miki	HEARTFAST; AH-Software	Japanese	Female	Miki Furukawa	December 4, 2009
Kaai Yuki	AH-Software	Japanese	Female		December 4, 2009
Hiyama Kiyoteru	AH-Software	Japanese	Male	Kiyoshi Hiyama	December 4, 2009
Big Al	PowerFX	English	Male	Michael King (beta voicebank); Frank S. (actual release)	December 22, 2009 March 5, 2010 (Japan)
Hatsune Miku Append	Crypton Future Media	Japanese	Female	Saki Fujita	April 30, 2010
Tonio	Zero-G	English	Male		July 14, 2010
Lily	Avex Management; Internet Co., Ltd.	Japanese	Female	Yūri Masuda (m.o.v.e.)	August 25, 2010
VY1 ("Mizki")	Yamaha Corporation/Bplats	Japanese	Unisex ("feminine" vocal)		September 1, 2010
Gachapoid: Ryuto	Fuji Television Kids Entertainment, Inc. Internet Co., Ltd	Japanese	Male	Kuniko Amemiya (Gachapin)	October 8, 2010
Nekomura Iroha	Sanrio Wave Co., Ltd. AH-Software	Japanese	Female	Kyounosuke Yoshitate	October 22, 2010
Utatane Piko	Sony Music Entertainment Japan; Ki/oon Records Inc.	Japanese	Male	Piko	December 8, 2010
Kagamine Rin & Len Append	Crypton Future Media	Japanese	Female (Rin); Male (Len)	Asami Shimoda	December 27, 2010
VY2 ("Yūma")	Yamaha Corporation/Bplats	Japanese	Unisex ("masculine" vocal)		April 25, 2011
Azuki	Sega	Japanese	Female	Yuka Ōtsubo	Restricted access (Only usable in 575 Utami)
Matcha	Sega	Japanese	Female	Ayaka Ōhashi	Restricted access (Only usable in 575 Utami)

=== VocaloWitter ===
Product	Developer	Language	Sex	Voice sampled	Release date
VY1	Yamaha Corporation/Bplats	Japanese	Unisex ("feminine" vocal)		December 2010
Aoki Lapis	i-Style Project; Yamaha Corporation/Bplats	Japanese	Female	Nako Eguchi	December 2012

=== iVocaloid ===
Product	Developer	Language	Sex	Voice sampled	Release date
VY1	Yamaha Corporation/Bplats	Japanese	Unisex ("feminine" vocal)		December 2010
VY2	Yamaha Corporation/Bplats	Japanese	Unisex ("masculine" vocal)		December 2011
Aoki Lapis	i-Style Project; Yamaha Corporation/Bplats	Japanese	Female	Nako Eguchi	December 2012
Merli	i-Style Project; Yamaha Corporation/Bplats	Japanese	Female	Misaki Kamata	April 2014

=== eVocaloid ===
Product	Developer	Language	Sex	Voice sampled	Release date
eVY1	Yamaha Corporation/Bplats	Japanese	Unisex ("feminine" vocal)		February 2014
Pocket Miku	Crypton Future Media	Japanese	Female	Saki Fujita	April 3, 2014
Vocaloid Keyboard	Yamaha Corporation	Japanese	(2012 ver. was eVY1 on NSX-1; 2015 ver. is based on Vocaloid-Board)		April 28, 2012

=== Vocaloid 3 ===
Product	Developer	Language	Sex	Voice sampled	Release date
Mew	Yamaha Corporation/Bplats	Japanese	Female	Miu Sakamoto	October 21, 2011
SeeU	SBS Artech	Korean; Japanese	Female	Dahee Kim (Glam)	October 21, 2011 (Korea); December 16, 2011 (Japan)
V3 Megpoid	Internet Co., Ltd.	Japanese	Female	Megumi Nakajima	October 21, 2011
VY1v3	Yamaha Corporation/Bplats	Japanese	Unisex ("feminine" sounding voice)		October 21, 2011
Tone Rion	Dear Stage (Moe Japan); Yamaha Corporation/Bplats	Japanese	Female	Nemu Yumemi	December 16, 2011
Oliver	PowerFX/VocaTone	English	Male		December 21, 2011
CUL	VOCALO Revolution; Internet Co., Ltd	Japanese	Female	Eri Kitamura	December 22, 2011
Yuzuki Yukari	VOCALOMAKETS; AH-Software	Japanese	Female	Chihiro Ishiguro	December 22, 2011
Bruno	Voctro Labs, S.L	Spanish	Male		December 23, 2011
Clara	Voctro Labs, S.L	Spanish	Female		December 23, 2011
IA	1st Place Co., Ltd.	Japanese	Female	Lia	January 27, 2012
V3 Megpoid - Native	Internet Co., Ltd	Japanese	Female	Megumi Nakajima	March 15, 2012
Aoki Lapis	i-Style Project; Yamaha Corporation/Bplats	Japanese	Female	Nako Eguchi	April 6, 2012
V3 Lily	Avex Management; Internet Co., Ltd	Japanese	Female	Yuri Masuda	April 19, 2012
Luo Tianyi	Shanghai Henian; Yamaha Corporation/Bplats	Chinese	Female	Shan Xin	July 12, 2012
V3 Gackpoid	Internet Co., Ltd	Japanese	Male	Gackt	July 13, 2012
galaco	Yamaha Corporation; Internet Co., Ltd; Stardust Music, Inc.	Japanese	Female	Ko Shibasaki	August 5, 2012 (prize in the Vocaloid 3 music contest)
VY2v3	Yamaha Corporation/Bplats	Japanese	Unisex ("masculine" sounding voice)		October 19, 2012
Mayu	Exit Tunes Co., Ltd.	Japanese	Female	Mayumi Morinaga	December 5, 2012
Avanna	Zero-G	English	Female	Rachael.	December 22, 2012
KAITO V3	Crypton Future Media	Japanese; English	Male	Naoto Fūga	February 15, 2013
Megpoid English	Internet Co., Ltd	English	Female	Megumi Nakajima	February 28, 2013
ZOLA Project	Yamaha Corporation/Bplats	Japanese	Male	Minoru Takahashi (YUU); Yuu Miyazaki (KYO); Mauie Cayton (WIL)	June 20, 2013
Yanhe	Shanghai Henian; Yamaha Corporation/Bplats	Chinese	Female	Seira Ryū	July 11, 2013
Hatsune Miku V3 English	Crypton Future Media	English	Female	Saki Fujita	August 31, 2013 (download); September 26, 2013 (retail)
Yohioloid	PowerFX/Vocatone	English, Japanese	Male	Yohio	September 10, 2013 (download); September 17, 2013 (retail)
Hatsune Miku V3	Crypton Future Media	Japanese	Female	Saki Fujita	September 26, 2013
Maika	Voctro Labs, S.L	Spanish	Female		December 18, 2013 (download); January 31, 2014 (retail)
Merli	i-Style Project; Yamaha Corporation/Bplats	Japanese	Female	Misaki Kamata	December 24, 2013 (download); February 5, 2014 (retail)
Macne Nana	MI7; Yamaha Corporation/Bplats	Japanese; English	Female	Haruna Ikezawa	January 31, 2014
MEIKO V3	Crypton Future Media	Japanese; English	Female	Meiko Haigō	February 4, 2014
kokone	Internet Co., Ltd	Japanese	Female		February 14, 2014
Anon & Kanon	Yamaha Corporation/Bplats	Japanese	Female		March 3, 2014
V Flower	Gynoid Co., Ltd. Yamaha Corporation/Bplats	Japanese	Female		May 9, 2014 (Download); July 16, 2014 (Retail)
Tohoku Zunko	AH-Software	Japanese	Female	Satomi Sato	June 5, 2014
IA Rocks	1st Place Co., Ltd.	Japanese	Female	Lia	June 27, 2014
galaco Neo	Yamaha Corporation; Stardust Music, Inc.	Japanese	Female	Ko Shibasaki	August 5, 2014
Rana	We've Inc. Furyu Corporation	Japanese	Female	Ai Kakuma	September 9, 2014 (usable through Vocalo-P ni Naritai magazine)
Gachapoid V3	Fuji Television Kids Entertainment, Inc. Internet Co., Ltd	Japanese	Male	Kuniko Amemiya	September 17, 2014
Chika	Avex Management; Internet Co., Ltd	Japanese	Female	Chiaki Ito (AAA)	October 16, 2014
Xin Hua	Gynoid Co., Ltd. Yamaha Corporation/Bplats	Chinese	Female	Wenyi Wang	February 10, 2015
Yuezheng Ling	Shanghai Henian	Chinese	Female	QI Inory	July 17, 2015

=== Vocaloid 4 ===
Product	Developer	Language	Sex	Voice sampled	Release date
VY1v4	Yamaha Corporation/Bplats	Japanese	"Unisex" (female voice)		December 17, 2014
Cyber Diva	Yamaha Corporation/Bplats	English	Female	Jenny Shima	February 4, 2015
Yuzuki Yukari V4	VOCALOMAKETS; AH-Software	Japanese	Female	Chihiro Ishiguro	March 18, 2015
Megurine Luka V4X	Crypton Future Media	Japanese; English	Female	Yū Asakawa	March 19, 2015
Gackpoid V4	Internet Co. Ltd.	Japanese	Male	Gackt	April 30, 2015
SF-A2 Miki V4	HEARTFAST; AH-Software	Japanese	Female	Miki Furukawa	June 18, 2015
Nekomura Iroha V4	Sanrio Wave Co., Ltd. AH-Software	Japanese	Female	Kyounosuke Yoshitate	June 18, 2015
V4 Flower	Gynoid Co., Ltd.	Japanese	Female		July 16, 2015
Sachiko	Yamaha Corporation	Japanese	Female	Sachiko Kobayashi	July 27, 2015
ARSloid	Yamaha Corporation; Universal Music Japan	Japanese	Male	Akira Kano	September 23, 2015
Ruby	VocaTone/PowerFX	English	Female	Mishakeet	October 7, 2015
Kaai Yuki V4	AH-Software	Japanese	Female		October 29, 2015
Hiyama Kiyoteru V4	AH-Software	Japanese	Male	Kiyoshi Hiyama	October 29, 2015
Megpoid V4	Internet Co. Ltd.	Japanese	Female	Megumi Nakajima	November 5, 2015
Dex	Zero-G	English	Male	Sam Blakeslee	November 20, 2015 (Windows); December 12, 2015 (macOS)
Daina	Zero-G	English	Female	Aki Glancy	November 20, 2015 (Windows); December 12, 2015 (macOS)
Rana V4	We've Inc. Furyu Corporation	Japanese	Female	Ai Kakuma	December 1, 2015
Kagamine Rin & Len V4X	Crypton Future Media	Japanese	Female (Rin); Male (Len)	Asami Shimoda	December 24, 2015
Kagamine Rin & Len V4 English	Crypton Future Media	English	Female (Rin); Male (Len)	Asami Shimoda	December 24, 2015
Unity-chan!: Kohaku Otori	Yamaha Corporation; Unity Technologies Japan	Japanese	Female	Asuka Kakumoto	January 14, 2016
Fukase	Yamaha Corporation	Japanese; English	Male	Satoshi Fukase	January 28, 2016
Stardust: Xingchen	Shanghai Henian; Beijing Photek S&T	Chinese	Female	Chalili	April 13, 2016
Otomachi Una	MTK Inc. Internet Co., Ltd.	Japanese	Female	Aimi Tanaka	July 30, 2016
Hatsune Miku V4X	Crypton Future Media	Japanese	Female	Saki Fujita	August 31, 2016
Hatsune Miku V4 English	Crypton Future Media	English	Female	Saki Fujita	August 31, 2016
Tohoku Zunko V4	AH-Software	Japanese	Female	Satomi Sato	October 27, 2016
Cyber Songman	Yamaha Corporation	English	Male		October 31, 2016
Macne Nana V4	MI7	Japanese (Nana, Petit); English (Nana)	Female	Haruna Ikezawa	December 15, 2016
Uni	ST Media	Korean	Female		February 14, 2017
Tone Rion V4	Dear Stage (Moe Japan)	Japanese	Female	Nemu Yumemi	February 16, 2017
Yumemi Nemu	Dear Stage (Moe Japan)	Japanese	Female	Nemu Yumemi	February 16, 2017
Yuezheng Longya	Shanghai Henian	Chinese	Male	Jie Zhang	June 24, 2017 (Windows); December 10, 2018 (macOS)
Azuki	Yamaha Corporation; Sega	Japanese	Female	Yuka Ōtsubo	July 12, 2017
Matcha	Yamaha Corporation; Sega	Japanese	Female	Ayaka Ohashi	July 12, 2017
Lumi	Akatsuki Virtual Artists	Japanese	Female	Sayaka Ohara	August 30, 2017
Xin Hua V4	Gynoid Co., Ltd. Shanghai Wangcheng	Chinese	Female	Wenyi Wang	September 1, 2017
Hatsune Miku V4 Chinese	Crypton Future Media	Chinese	Female	Saki Fujita	September 5, 2017
Xin Hua Japanese	Gynoid Co., Ltd.	Japanese	Female	Wenyi Wang	September 22, 2017
Luo Tianyi V4	Shanghai Henian	Chinese	Female	Shan Xin	December 30, 2017 (Windows); December 10, 2018 (macOS)
Kizuna Akari	VOCALOMAKETS; AH-Software	Japanese	Female	Madoka Yonezawa	April 26, 2018
Zhang Chuchu	Shanghai Wangcheng; Migu Comics	Chinese	Female	Wan Su	April 30, 2018 (limited distribution)
Yuecheng	Shanghai Wangcheng; Chengdu Yuefang Cultural Broadcast Co.	Chinese	Male	Nuochen	April 30, 2018 (limited distribution)
Luo Tianyi V4 Japanese	Shanghai Henian	Japanese	Female	Shan Xin; Kano	May 18, 2018
Mirai Komachi	Bandai Namco Studio, Inc; Yamaha Corporation	Japanese	Female		May 24, 2018
Zhiyu Moke	Shanghai Henian	Chinese	Male	Shangqing Su	August 2, 2018 (Windows); December 10, 2018 (macOS)
Mo Qingxian	Shanghai Henian	Chinese	Female	Mingyue	August 2, 2018 (Windows); December 10, 2018 (macOS)
PIAPRO CHARACTERS SUPER PACK	Crypton Future Media	Japanese	Female (Miku, Rin, Luka, MEIKO); Male (Len, KAITO)	Saki Fujita (Miku); Asami Shimoda (Rin, Len); Yū Asakawa (Luka); Meiko Haigō (MEIKO); Naoto Fūga (KAITO)	August 30, 2024

=== Vocaloid 5 ===
Product	Developer	Language	Sex	Voice sampled	Release date
Amy, Chris, Kaori, & Ken	Yamaha Corporation	English (Amy, Chris); Japanese (Kaori, Ken)	Female (Amy, Kaori); Male (Chris, Ken)		July 12, 2018
Cyber Diva II	Yamaha Corporation	English	Female	Jenny Shima	July 12, 2018
Cyber Songman II	Yamaha Corporation	English	Male		July 12, 2018
VY1	Yamaha Corporation	Japanese	Unisex ("feminine" sounding voice)		July 12, 2018
VY2	Yamaha Corporation	Japanese	Unisex ("masculine" sounding voice)		July 12, 2018
Haruno Sora	AH-Software	Japanese	Female	Kikuko Inoue	July 26, 2018
Meika Hime & Mikoto	Gynoid Co., Ltd.	Japanese	Unspecified ("feminine" sounding voices)	Kotori Koiwai	March 30, 2019
Luo Tianyi V5	Shanghai Henian	Chinese	Female	Shan Xin	February 12, 2023
Yanhe V5	Shanghai Henian	Chinese	Female	Seira Ryū	February 12, 2023
Yuezheng Ling V5	Shanghai Henian	Chinese	Female	QI Inory	February 12, 2023
Adachi Rei V5	missile39 Yamaha Corporation	Japanese	Female	100% artificial voice	October 9, 2026

=== Vocaloid 6 ===
Product	Developer	Base Language(s) (Note: Vocaloid 6 includes the "Multilingual" function, which allows lyrics to be sung in a mixture of Japanese English, and Mandarin Chinese using a single voicebank regardless of the recorded base language. Classification of multiple base languages is determined by a company's description of the product as well as confirmed recorded materials.)	Sex	Voice sampled	Release date
Sarah, Allen, Haruka, & Akito	Yamaha Corporation	English (Sarah, Allen); Japanese (Haruka, Akito)	Female (Sarah, Haruka); Male (Allen, Akito)		October 13, 2022
AI Megpoid	Internet Co., Ltd.	Japanese	Female	Megumi Nakajima	October 13, 2022
Po-uta	Yamaha Corporation; Sample Sized, LLC.	English	Male	Porter Robinson	March 7, 2023
Fuiro	Yamaha Corporation nana Music Co., Ltd.	Japanese	Female	philo	May 9, 2023
ZOLA Project V6	Yamaha Corporation; Internet Co., Ltd.	Japanese	Male	Minoru Takahashi (YUU); Yuu Miyazaki (KYO); Mauie Cayton (WIL)	June 20, 2023 (Yamaha; Digital Only); January 20, 2025 (Internet; Digital & Physical)
AI Otomachi Una	MTK Inc. Internet Co., Ltd.	Japanese	Female	Aimi Tanaka	June 22, 2023
Sakura, Asahi, Shion, & Taku	Yamaha Corporation	Japanese	Female (Sakura, Shion); Male (Asahi, Taku)		December 25, 2023
Michelle & Lucas	Yamaha Corporation	English	Female (Michelle); Male (Lucas)		February 19, 2024
AI Hibiki Koto	Internet Co., Ltd.	Japanese	Female	Leon Tachibana	April 18, 2024
Shiki Rowen	Mugen Co., Ltd. Yamaha Corporation	Japanese	Male	yuuma	April 24, 2024
AI Megpoid SOLID	Internet Co., Ltd.	Japanese	Female	Megumi Nakajima	July 4, 2024
GekiyakuV	Kuzutokaze; Yamaha Corporation	Japanese	Female	Kurukuru Suuzi	July 18, 2024
KazehikiV	Kuzutokaze; Yamaha Corporation	Japanese	Male	Kurukuru Suuzi	July 18, 2024
galaco BLACK & WHITE	Yamaha Corporation; Internet Co., Ltd. Stardust Music, Inc.	Japanese	Female	Ko Shibasaki	August 5, 2024
AI Tsuina-chan	Tsuina, the Ogre Hunter Project; Internet Co., Ltd.	Japanese	Female	Mai Kadowaki	September 30, 2024
Yuina & Naoki	Yamaha Corporation	Japanese	Female (Yuina); Male (Naoki)		October 9, 2024
Vocalo no Ci-chan	Yamaha Corporation	Japanese	Female	Ci the Jiangshi	October 9, 2024
Kanade	774 Inc. Yamaha Corporation	Japanese	Female	Kanon Kanade	November 27, 2024 (Japan); December 5, 2024 (Overseas)
Jessica, Matthew, Brian, & Sandra	Yamaha Corporation	English	Female (Jessica, Sandra); Male (Matthew, Brian)		December 18, 2024
Uge	774 Inc. Yamaha Corporation	Japanese	Female	Uge And	January 15, 2025
Kasukabe Tsumugi	KasukabeTsumugi Project	Japanese	Female	Tsukushi Kasukabe	March 3, 2025
AI Yuzuki Yukari	VOCALOMAKETS; Internet Co., Ltd.	Japanese	Female	Chihiro Ishiguro	March 13, 2025
Kotonoha Akane & Aoi	AI, Inc. Internet Co., Ltd.	Japanese	Female	Yui Sakakibara	April 25, 2025
Kana & Hayato	Yamaha Corporation	Japanese	Female (Kana); Male (Hayato)		June 11, 2025
AI Kizuna Akari	VOCALOMAKETS; Internet Co., Ltd.	Japanese	Female	Madoka Yonezawa	June 13, 2025
AI NurseRobot_TypeT	Kuranari Private Hospital; Yamaha Corporation	Japanese; Chinese	Female	Matsuokayu	July 16, 2025
Otobe Sapphire	Studio Entre Inc.	Japanese	Female	Yunchi	November 4, 2025
Aya & Kazuya	Yamaha Corporation	Japanese	Female (Aya); Male (Kazuya)		November 19, 2025
Asa	Yamaha Corporation	Japanese	Female		December 3, 2025
IA : [R]	1st Place Co., Ltd.	Japanese	Female	Lia	January 27, 2026
Hatsune Miku V6	Crypton Future Media	Japanese	Female	Saki Fujita	April 14, 2026
Mirai Komachi V6	Bandai Namco Studio, Inc; Yamaha Corporation	Japanese	Female		May 26, 2026
Adachi Rei V6	missile39 Yamaha Corporation	Japanese	Female	100% artificial voice	October 9, 2026
Kenji	Yamaha Corporation	Japanese	Male		TBA
Yuka	Yamaha Corporation	Japanese	Female		TBA
Iori Yuzuru	AI, Inc. Internet Co., Ltd.	Japanese	Male	Yoshiyuki Matsuura	TBA

=== Vocaloid 7 ===
Product	Developer	Base Language(s) (Note: Vocaloid 6 includes the "Multilingual" function, which allows lyrics to be sung in a mixture of Japanese English, and Mandarin Chinese using a single voicebank regardless of the recorded base language. Classification of multiple base languages is determined by a company's description of the product as well as confirmed recorded materials.)	Sex	Voice sampled	Release date
Asa	Yamaha Corporation	Japanese	Female		November 11, 2026
AI Megpoid	Internet Co., Ltd.	Japanese	Female	Megumi Nakajima	November 11, 2026
LUCI	Yamaha Corporation	Japanese	Female	Akatsuki Luci	November 11, 2026
GekiyakuV	Kuzutokaze; Yamaha Corporation	Japanese	Female	Kurukuru Suuzi	November 11, 2026
KazehikiV	Kuzutokaze; Yamaha Corporation	Japanese	Male	Kurukuru Suuzi	November 11, 2026
NurseRobot_TypeT	Kuranari Private Hospital; Yamaha Corporation	Japanese; Chinese	Female	Matsuokayu	November 11, 2026
Iori Yuzuru	AI, Inc. Internet Co., Ltd.	Japanese	Male	Yoshiyuki Matsuura	TBA

=== Mobile Vocaloid Editor ===
Product	Developer	Language	Sex	Voice sampled	Release date
VY1 "lite"	Yamaha Corporation/Bplats	Japanese	Female		
VY1 "Full"	Yamaha Corporation/Bplats	Japanese	Female		
VY2	Yamaha Corporation/Bplats	Japanese	Male		
YUU	Yamaha Corporation/Bplats	Japanese	Male	Minorun	
KYO	Yamaha Corporation/Bplats	Japanese	Male	Nanox	
WIL	Yamaha Corporation/Bplats	Japanese	Male	Maui	
Aoki Lapis	i-Style Project; Yamaha Corporation/Bplats	Japanese	Female	Nako Eguchi	
Merli	i-Style Project; Yamaha Corporation/Bplats	Japanese	Female	Misaki Kamata	
galaco "Red"	Yamaha Corporation; Stardust Music, Inc.	Japanese	Female	Ko Shibasaki	
galaco "Blue"	Yamaha Corporation; Stardust Music, Inc.	Japanese	Female	Ko Shibasaki	
Mew	Yamaha Corporation/Bplats	Japanese	Female	Miu Sakamoto	
Cyber Diva	Yamaha Corporation/Bplats	English	Female	Jenny Shima	
Sachiko	Yamaha Corporation/Bplats	Japanese	Female	Sachiko Kobayashi	
Yuzuki Yukari "Jun"	VOCALOMAKETS; AH-Software	Japanese	Female	Chihiro Ishiguro	
Yuzuki Yukari "Onn"	VOCALOMAKETS; AH-Software	Japanese	Female	Chihiro Ishiguro	
Yuzuki Yukari "Rin"	VOCALOMAKETS; AH-Software	Japanese	Female	Chihiro Ishiguro	
V3 Megpoid - Native	Internet Co., Ltd.	Japanese	Female	Megumi Nakajima	
Megpoid English	Internet Co., Ltd.	English	Female	Megumi Nakajima	
Yumemi Nemu	Moe Japan, Co. Ltd.	Japanese	Female	Nemu Yumemi	
Cyber Songman	Yamaha Corporation/Bplats	English	Male	Unknown	
Hatsune Miku	Crypton Future Media	Japanese	Female	Saki Fujita	
Zunko	AH-Software	Japanese	Female	Satomi Sato	
Miki_Natural	HEARTFAST; AH-Software	Japanese	Female	Miki Furukawa	
Kaai Yuki	AH-Software	Japanese	Female	Unknown	
Hiyama Kiyoteru Natural	AH-Software	Japanese	Male	Kiyoshi Hiyama	
Hiyama Kiyoteru Rock	AH-Software	Japanese	Male	Kiyoshi Hiyama	
Fukase JP	Yamaha Corporation	Japanese	Male	Satoshi Fukase	
Fukase EN	Yamaha Corporation	English	Male	Satoshi Fukase	
V Flower	Gynoid Co., Ltd. Yamaha Corporation/Bplats	Japanese	Female	Unknown	
Rana	We've Inc. Furyu Corporation	Japanese	Female	Ai Kakuma	
IA	1st Place Co., Ltd.	Japanese	Female	Lia	
IA Rocks	1st Place Co., Ltd.	Japanese	Female	Lia	
Unity-chan!	Unity Technologies Japan	Japanese	Female	Asuka Kakumoto	

=== Vocaloid Neo ===
Product	Developer	Language	Sex	Voice sampled	Release date
VY1v3 Neo	Yamaha Corporation/Bplats	Japanese	Unisex ("feminine" vocal)		August 5, 2013
Mew Neo	Yamaha Corporation/Bplats	Japanese	Female	Miu Sakamoto	August 5, 2013
Hatsune Miku V3 English	Crypton Future Media	English	Female	Saki Fujita	August 31, 2013
ZOLA Project Neo	Yamaha Corporation/Bplats	Japanese	Male	Minorun (YUU); Nanox (KYO); Maui (WIL)	September 19, 2013
Aoki Lapis Neo	i-Style Project; Yamaha Corporation/Bplats	Japanese	Female	Nako Eguchi	September 19, 2013
Hatsune Miku V3	Crypton Future Media	Japanese	Female	Saki Fujita	September 26, 2013
VY2v3 Neo	Yamaha Corporation/Bplats	Japanese	Unisex ("masculine" vocal)		October 2013
IA Neo	1st Place Co., Ltd.	Japanese	Female	Lia	December 7, 2013
Maika	Voctro Labs, S.L	Spanish	Female		December 18, 2013
Yuzuki Yukari	VOCALOMAKETS; AH-Software	Japanese	Female	Chihiro Ishiguro	December 19, 2013
Merli Neo	i-Style Project; Yamaha Corporation/Bplats	Japanese	Female	Misaki Kamata	December 24, 2013
Macne Nana	MI7; Yamaha Corporation/Bplats	Japanese; English	Female	Haruna Ikezawa	January 31, 2014
MEIKO V3	Crypton Future Media	Japanese; English	Female	Meiko Haigo	February 4, 2014
kokone	Internet Co., Ltd	Japanese	Female		February 14, 2014
KAITO V3	Crypton Future Media	Japanese; English	Male	Naoto Fūga	February 15, 2014
V3 Megpoid	Internet Co., Ltd	Japanese	Female	Megumi Nakajima	February 26, 2014
V3 Lily	Internet Co., Ltd	Japanese	Female	Yuri Masuda	February 26, 2014
V3 Gackpoid	Internet Co., Ltd	Japanese	Male	Gackt	February 26, 2014
V3 Megpoid - Native	Internet Co., Ltd	Japanese	Female	Megumi Nakajima	February 26, 2014
Megpoid English	Internet Co., Ltd	English	Female	Megumi Nakajima	February 26, 2014
CUL	Internet Co., Ltd	Japanese	Female	Eri Kitamura	February 26, 2014
Anon & Kanon	Yamaha Corporation/Bplats	Japanese	Female		March 3, 2014
V Flower	Gynoid Co., Ltd. Yamaha Corporation/Bplats	Japanese	Female		May 9, 2014
Tohoku Zunko	AH-Software	Japanese	Female	Satomi Satō	June 5, 2014
IA Rocks	1st Place Co., Ltd.	Japanese	Female	Lia	June 27, 2014
galaco Neo	Yamaha Corporation/Bplats; Stardust Music, Inc.	Japanese	Female	Ko Shibasaki	August 5, 2014
Gachapoid V3	Fuji Television Kids Entertainment, Inc. Internet Co., Ltd	Japanese	Male	Kuniko Amemiya	September 17, 2014
Chika	Avex Management; Internet Co., Ltd	Japanese	Female	Chiaki Ito	October 16, 2014
Tone Rion	Dear Stage (Moe Japan)	Japanese	Female	Nemu Yumemi	May 26, 2015
Xin Hua	Gynoid Co., Ltd. Yamaha Corporation/Bplats	Chinese	Female	Wenyi Wang	April 29, 2016

=== Commercially unreleased ===
Product	Developer	Language	Sex	Voice sampled	Status
Original Big AL	PowerFX	English	Male	Michael King	Voice provider replaced
CV-4Cβ	Crypton Future Media	Japanese	Female	Eriko Nakamura	Unknown
CV04	Crypton Future Media	Japanese	Male		Unknown
Project if... (Junger März Prototype β)	Crypton Future Media	Japanese	Unisex (female voice)		Unknown
Hatsune Miku Falsetto	Crypton Future Media	Japanese	Female	Saki Fujita	Shelved
Akikoloid-chan	Yamaha Corporation; Lawson	Japanese	Female	Arimoto	Private (retired, though in use for AI)
Ueki-loid	Music Airport Inc. Yamaha Corporation	Japanese	Male	Hitoshi Ueki	Private
Anri Rune	Fuji TV	Japanese	Female		Private (retired)
SeeU English	SBS Artech	English	Female	Dahee Kim	Unknown
Hibiki Lui	Yamaha Corporation; VocaNext	Japanese	Male		Abandoned Project
Ring Suzune	Yamaha Corporation; VocaNext	Japanese	Female	MiKA (Daisy x Daisy)	Abandoned Project
Megpoid Falsetto	Internet Co., Ltd	Japanese	Female	Megumi Nakajima	Cancelled in favor of kokone
Hide	Yamaha Corporation	Japanese	Male	hide	Private
Zhanyin Lorra	Shanghai He Nian; NetEase	Chinese	Female	Gui Xian Ren	Abandoned Project
Kojiloid	Crypton Future Media	English	Male	Kojima	English testing vocal
Yao Luniang	Shanghai Wangcheng; NetEase Comics	Chinese	Female		Abandoned Project
Zing	Exit Tunes; Aquatrax	Japanese, Chinese, and English	Female		Unknown
Uni Append	ST Media	Korean	Female		Unknown
Uni English	ST Media	English	Female		Unknown
Cocorobo	Sharp Corporation	Japanese	Female	Ibuki Kido	Unknown
REV	VOCALO Revolution	Japanese	Male		Abandoned Project
Charlie	Yamaha Corporation	Japanese	Male	TBA	Robot released on May 13, 2021
AI Hibari Misora	Yamaha Corporation	Japanese	Female	Hibari Misora	Private
