= Lily (software) =

Vocaloid synthesizer software

- V3 Lily package
- Developer: Internet Co., Ltd.
- Release: August 25, 2010
- Stable release: V3 Lily / April 19, 2012
- Operating system: Windows
- Platform: PC, Mac
- Available in: Japanese
- Type: Vocal Synthesizer Application
- License: Proprietary
- Website: www.ssw.co.jp/products/vocal/lily/index.html

Lily (リリィ) is a female vocal originally released for Vocaloid 2. The data for the voice was created by sampling the voice of Yuri Masuda, a Japanese vocalist of the Japanese musical group m.o.v.e.

== Development ==
Lily originally appeared on the cover of the CD "anim.o.v.e. 01" released on Aug 19th, 2009, before the announcement of her VOCALOID development. Lily was introduced as "Code Name: Lily" on DTM MAGAZINE, published in May 2010. The voice source is the lead vocalist of m.o.v.e., Yuri Masuda, whose given name literally means 'lily'. The idea of developing a VOCALOID based on Yuri's voice occurred, as one of the members was a user of VOCALOID. The illustration of Lily's VOCALOID was used on the Anim.o.v.e album while the voicebank was in development.

=== Additional software ===
V3 Lily was announced in early 2012 for Vocaloid 3. One of the earliest notes about this was that the new V3 Lily vocal would have a slightly larger vocal range. In July 2013, Internet Co., Ltd. announced a Mac update of this product for the Vocaloid Neo engine. Two vocals were included with the package V3 Lily; Native which is an update of the Vocaloid 2 vocal and V3 Lily, which was a newly recorded voice. When imported into Vocaloid 4, the vocals will be able to cross-synthesize with each other.

Lily and Gackpoid were brought up in a tweet during the Megpoid English development. But English vocals could only occur if they were profitable. In October 2014, it was noted they currently have no plans for a Lily English.:

== Characteristics ==
Name	Lily
Release	August 25, 2010
Suggested Tempo	90 ~ 180BPM
Suggested Vocal Range	D2 ~ D4 (V2, Native), D2 ~ G4 (Lily V3)

== Video Game ==
Lily appeared in an iOS game called "Vocadol" along with Vocals Anon & Kanon, VY1, Aoki Lapis, Merli, Cul and Kokone.
