= Kokone =

Vocaloid synthesizer software

- Developer: Internet Co., Ltd.
- Release: February 14, 2014
- Operating system: Windows
- Platform: PC
- Available in: Japanese
- Type: Vocal Synthesizer Application
- License: Proprietary
- Website: www.ssw.co.jp/products/vocal3/kokone/index.html

Kokone (心響), whose name means "Heart Sound" in Japanese, is a Vocaloid 3 vocal released by Internet Co., Ltd.

== Development ==
Kokone's project began with the development a falsetto vocal for the Megpoid software. The trouble was matching all 50 Japanese phonetics from Gumi's normal vocal and her falsetto. The focus of the vocal would have been to extend GUMI's range beyond "F4" giving her the capabilities to reach the range "A3" in the Vocaloid software. Due issues with balancing the vocal with the normal vocals, it was dropped and instead focus turned to developing a vocal instead with Falsetto capabilities already built in. Kokone was the vocal that came from this and due to the extension of cover a falsetto vocal range, she had the largest optimum range of any single vocal for Vocaloid at the time of release.

She was first announced via Twitter on December 23, 2013 which featured her first demo song. A tweet soon followed confirming her February release. The vocal was confirmed to be based on a new vocalist and was not from any of Internet co., Ltd's existing released vocalists.

Most of Kokone's production was made in-house.

She is also compatible with Mac versions of Vocaloid.

== Video Game ==
Kokone appeared in an iOS game called "Vocadol" along with Vocals Anon & Kanon, Lily, Aoki Lapis, Merli, Cul and VY1.
