= Vocaloop =

- Manufacturer: Anizon
- Dates: 2014

Technical specifications
- Polyphony: Vocaloid: monophonic
- Hardware: Yamaha NSX-1 (eVY1)

Input/output
- Keyboard: No

The Anizon Vocaloop is a vocal loop sequencer featuring a Vocaloid sound chip. It was developed by the Tokyo-based project team Anizon.

== Overview ==
Vocaloop was originally designed by Shota Kagami, one of the co-inventors of the Vocaloid Keyboard. The hardware utilizes the "eVY1" NSX-1 LSI sound generator chip developed by Yamaha.

The first prototype appeared in Japanese tech media in March 2014. Later that year, the prototype was showcased at the Experimental Electronic Event hosted by Cobalt Bomb Alpha Omega and the Electronic Music Lab at the National University of Singapore, as well as the Japan Techno Showcase at Japan Expo in Paris, France.
