= Galaco =

Voice synthesizer software

- Galaco Neo package
- Developers: Internet Co., Ltd. Yamaha Corporation; Stardust Music, Inc.
- Release: August 5, 2012
- Stable release: Galaco BLACK & WHITE / August 5, 2024
- Operating system: Microsoft Windows macOS
- Available in: Japanese (V3, NEO, V6); English (V6); Mandarin Chinese (V6)
- Type: Voice Synthesizer Software
- License: Proprietary

Galaco (ギャラ子) is a female vocal first released as an entry prize for Vocaloid 3. She was sampled from Ko Shibasaki of the Japanese band galaxias!.

== Development ==
A doll was produced by BLYTHE and custom made by galaxxxy for use by the band on albums prior to her unveiling as part of a promotion.

Galaco was first referred to as a VOCALOID when the VOCALOID Shop's competition for Vocaloid 3 vocals was extended to allow newly release vocals V3 Megpoid - Native and V3 Lily as possible entrants. She was worked on by Stardust Music, Inc. and Internet Co., Ltd. for Windows. She was offered as a prize for anyone who managed to get 1,000+ views on Nico Nico Douga in the Yamaha Shop music competition, but neither her name nor image was announced until late April 2012. A total of 697 people had won her vocal by 30 July and the vocal was released as a download only on August 5, 2012.

Access use to Galaco was never permanent and users were constantly issued with new codes every few months. The download expired on December 30, 2012 with the code running out on 31 January 2013. The first code reissued code extended usage until April 30, 2013. the following extension allowed use until October 30, 2013. No new issuing of Galaco's vocal was allowed and support was offered only to Japanese users. It was later confirmed the reason for the discontinued use of galaco was simply that Yamaha could not find a way for galaco to continue to exist in her current form, as they could not release a non-expiring serial code.

=== Additional software ===
In early August 2013, a new update for galaco was shown called "Galaco neo". Users who were given their free codes to extend Galaco's usage were asked to keep hold of them for future reference. The new version contains two new vocals, "Red" and "Blue", with "Red" being similar to the original release with improvements, and "Blue" is her original voice from her first appearance in the music video galaxias!, which was not featured in the original release. Stardust Music, Inc. worked with Yamaha Corporation to produce the update. The update was made for both Windows and Mac. Galaco NEO was set to be available to download on her birthday, August 5.

Her package was also bundled with Galaco Talk software, which uses the AITalk engine.

Both "Red" and "Blue" vocals were released on Mobile Vocaloid Editor, they are both sold separately.

On August 5, 2024, galaco received an update to VOCALOID6 as a pair of AI voicebanks (dubbed BLACK and WHITE respectively, with galaco sporting a different design for each vocal), in celebration of the 10th Anniversary of galaco NEO.

== See also ==
- List of Vocaloid products
