= Merli (software) =

Voice synthesizer software

- Merli - reverse sleeve
- Developers: Yamaha Corporation i-style Project
- Release: December 24, 2013
- Operating system: Microsoft Windows macOS
- Available in: Japanese
- Type: Voice Synthesizer Software
- Website: homepage

Merli (メルリ) was produced by Yamaha Corporation with i-style Project for Vocaloid 3. Her voice is provided by a contest winner, Japanese female, Misaki Kamata. Merli was developed as the elder sister to Aoki Lapis. She is named after the stone "Merlinite", which was the chosen name out of many suggestions put forward by fans of Vocaloid.

== Development ==
Merli was first announced in April 2012 as "i-style 2nd Project". A competition was held to find the name of the VOCALOID.

At the end of June 2012, an i-style video event featured a silhouette of her in profile in a live stream and confirmed details of her were due soon. At the end of July 2012, i-style Project released illustrations of her on their official website, and on early August 2012, i-style Project started an open recruitment for a voice provider for Merli. The deadline of the recruitment was set on September 10, 2012. Later this was extended to the November 30, 2012.

On November 30, 2012, the auditions were over and the process of choosing had begun. In March 2013, it was announced that 6 vocalists had been chosen from the auditions. The third and final audition to choose the vocalist for Merli occurred on the March 14, 2013, in relation to Aoki Lapis' anniversary at Shibuya O-nest.

Merli was released on December 24, 2013. Her official boxart was shown on December 17, 2013, and it comes with a silhouette jacket by default. The jacket can be flipped to display a colour avatar version of Merli instead if the owner prefers it over the default art.

=== Additional Software ===
Merli was released for the iVocaloid iOS app and later Mobile Vocaloid Editor.

== Characteristics ==
Merli is a Fairy. Her official profile says, "She is strong-minded and tsundere; a charming mysterious girl, who is innocent and expressive. She's naive, but usually pretends to know everything." If Lapis can be seen as "light", then Merli would be seen as "dark". Her race are special people who can convert “songs” into “power”, and can only be seen by a subset of the human population. Merli's power draws away the energy of living things; the opposite of her sister's power.

== Video Games & Apps ==
Merli appeared in an iOS game called "Vocadol" along with Vocals Anon & Kanon, Lily, Aoki Lapis, VY1, Cul and Kokone.

For Merli a free iOS and Android app was produced, called "Good Night Merli (おやすみメルリ)". Much like the one for Lapis, it helps you fall asleep and comes with an alarm.

Several apps were released of which in "(ラピスと魔法のメロディ), she makes a prominent appearance. She also makes cameos and brief appearances in other apps within the series.

== See also ==
- List of Vocaloid products
