= Mew (software) =

Voice synthesizer software

- Mew Neo package
- Developer: Yamaha Corporation
- Release: September 30, 2011
- Stable release: Mew Neo / 2013
- Operating system: Microsoft Windows macOS
- Available in: Japanese
- Type: Voice Synthesizer Software

Mew (ミウ) is a female vocal released for Vocaloid 3. Her sampled voice is provided by Japanese female singer Miu Sakamoto.

== Development ==
Mew was first featured on the CD "THE VOCALOIDS" and sang the song "LINE," by Yuyoyuppe. Her cover art was revealed on September 13, 2011. The vocal was released on September 30, 2011 along with the vocal packages SeeU, V3 Megpoid and VY1v3, making her one of the first four Vocaloid 3 releases offered for that version of Vocaloid.

The original version of Mew was discontinued from sale on April 20, 2013. The package was replaced with a re-release called "Mew SE". In 2013, a Mac version of Mew called "Mew NEO" was released. This used the new Vocaloid Neo engine to work on Mac computers.

=== Additional Software ===
Her vocal was also released for Mobile Vocaloid Editor.

== See also ==
- List of Vocaloid products
