= ARSloid =

Japanese Vocaloid voicebank

ARSLoid
- Developer: Yamaha Corporation
- Release: September 23, 2015
- Operating system: Microsoft Windows macOS
- Available in: Japanese
- Type: Voice Synthesizer Software
- License: Proprietary
- Website: Homepage

Arsloid (アルスロイド) is a Vocaloid 4 vocal synthesizer. The sampled voice was Kano Akira, a member of the Japanese odorite group Arsmagna.

== Development ==
On 16 June 2015 it was revealed that Akira Kano would be made into a Vocaloid. Artwork and a demo was also released. The company stated they were unsure whether the voicebank would be released commercially.

It was later revealed on July 30 that it would be available for a public release. From July 30 to August 13, customers were able to pre-order and reserve the physical starter pack, but the download version would follow a normal release. It was released on September 23. He was shown to come with three voicebanks, and be capable of cross-Synthesis. The two "Extension Libraries" are "soft" and "bright".

== Characteristics ==
In his character biography, his personality is described:

He has a strong sense of duty, and is bright and lively. He is quick to get in a fight, and always has fresh wounds. He has good reflexes and is a popular person who never runs out of requests from different clubs asking for support, starting with his specialty – basketball. On the other hand, he also has an awkward and easily lonely side. He occasionally gets hurt from pranks which don't have bad intentions.

His design is based on the school uniform the 2D idol group wears, from the fictional 'Chronos Senior High School'.
