= VY1 =

Vocal synthesizer software

- VY1V4 package
- Release: September 1, 2010
- Stable release: VY1V5 / July 12, 2018
- Operating system: Microsoft Windows macOS
- Available in: Japanese
- Type: Voice Synthesizer Software
- License: Proprietary

VY1 is a Japanese female vocal developed by Yamaha Corporation and distributed by Bplats, Inc. to act as a "standard" vocal for Vocaloid. It has the codename of "Mizki". It was originally released for the Vocaloid 2 engine.

== Development ==
VY1 was created to act as a standard Vocaloid product able to produce notable high quality results. Its name of "VY1" stands for "Vocaloid Yamaha 1", its codename of "Mizki" refers to the flower hanamizuki. Its creation echoed the development of Meiko a number of years earlier. It was originally released as a "Standard" and "Deluxe" version. Compared to many other Vocal releases for the software, it lacks an avatar, though a number of concepts have appeared over time to show individual producer interpretations of the Vocaloid.

VY1 also had an overhauled version of the Japanese vocal library system for Vocaloid 2 without the need of an engine update that resulted in "improved" performance over past Japanese vocals.

A male counterpart vocal called VY2 was also later released for this vocal.

VY1 was also used for VOCALO Revolution, a Vocaloid related TV program that aired in Japan in January 2011, and was used as the singing vocal for the shows mascot "CUL.

=== Additional software ===
As it was created to head Yamaha products, it has since been released for multiple versions of the software, as the primarily offered vocal and has more releases than any other Vocal for the software.

It was the first vocal released for the iVocaloid iOS app under the name of "VY1t" and later re-released for the iOS app VocaloWitter.

The first of the major updates to occur to the software was upon the release of the Vocaloid 3 engine. It was one of four product released on October 21, 2011 for the new engine. This made it one of the first 4 products in addition released for the engine with Mew, SeeU and V3 Megpoid being the other three. Due to its success, it was released as "VY1V3 SE" later in 2013, in order to have a version with the latest Vocaloid 3 engine updates. A second re-release occurred also later in 2013 when it was updated to "VY1V3 Neo" and released for the Mac version of the software.

During this time, it featured in the first free version of Vocaloid, an iOS app named Vocaloid first under the name of "VY1 lite". This was a slimmed down version of the vocal.

The second major update to the vocal occurred on December 17, 2014 with the release of VY1V4 for the Vocaloid 4 engine. This was the first vocal released for the engine. The update contained 3 new additional vocals. "Normal", "Soft" and "Power", while the original vocal was released under the new name of "Natural".

The vocal was also released for the iOS app Mobile Vocaloid Editor, and the "Lite" version was supplied with the app as the first vocal. The full vocal could be downloaded among the vocals offered by the app.

The vocal was also developed for the "YAMAHA VOCALOID LSI "NSX-1" based Singing Keyboard" under the name of "eVY1". The first eVocaloid product released was the "Pocket Miku", which was originally planned to house the eVY1 chip but was changed because the developers felt that only Hatsune Miku's voice would be appropriate. The chip would go onto demonstrate the non-commercial product the "Vocaloid Keyboard", a Keytar with the eVocaloid chip inserted in.

On July 2, 2018, it was announced that the VOCALOID SHOP would cease distribution of the VOCALOID4 editor, the VOCALOID4 editor for Cubase, and the VOCALOID4 starter packs. In addition, VY1v4, VY2v3, Cyber Diva, and Cyber Songman were confirmed to be taken off of the site as well. This was set to occur on July 12.

== Video games ==
VY1 appeared in an iOS game called "Vocadol" under its codename of "Mizki" along with Vocals Anon & Kanon, Lily, Aoki Lapis, Merli, Cul and Kokone.

VY1 was also used for the iOS game Vocalodama (ボカロダマ), which was powered by a lite version of the Vocaloid engine.

== See also ==
- List of Vocaloid products
- VY2, the masculine counterpart of the vocal.
