= Chihiro Ishiguro =

Japanese voice actress

- Occupation: Voice actress
- Years active: 2007-present

Chihiro Ishiguro (石黒 千尋, Ishiguro Chihiro) is a Japanese voice actress. She records voices for both male and female characters in animation films. She is affiliated with Office Anemone, formerly affiliated with Aoni Production until December 2010. She made her career debut in 2007, by voicing Torimaki in the animation film Shugo Chara!.

She is from Yubari, Hokkaido.

== Notable roles ==
2007

- Shugo Chara! (Torimaki, a female student)

2008

- Hoshi Shin Ichi Shortcut, a literary program broadcast on NHK TV (as Hanako, a boy and others)
- Lilpri: Yubipuruhimechen!, Ringo Yukimori

2011

- Tales of the World: Radiant Mythology 3, Heroes Voice
- Vocaloid 3 (Yuzuki Yukari)
- Voiceroid+ (Yuzuki Yukari)

2013

- Girl Friend Beta, Saika Maeda

2014

- Idolrhythm, Suzuka Osaragi
- Danganronpa Another Episode: Ultra Despair Girls, Hiroko Hagakure

2015

- Ukiyo no shishi, Ukiyo no rōshi, Otose
- Venus11 Vivid!, Rei Raido, Mei Hiiragi
- Puyopuyo!! Quest Chiquita, Succubus, Elma

2016

- Advent Girl, Chōkō
- Ensemble Girls!, Kasumi Mikage
- Granblue Fantasy, Arie
- Shinobi Nightmare, Tamayori
- Yamato Chronicle Sōsei, Amenōzume

2017

- Granado Espada, Eileen, Lubiana

2018

- Sdorica, Nolva

2019

- Da Capo 4, Izumi Togawa
- Dairoku Ryōhei
- Merry Garland, Defravka

2020

- 100% Orange Juice, Arnelle
