= Internet Co., Ltd. =

Software company in Osaka, Japan

Internet Co., Ltd. 株式会社インターネット
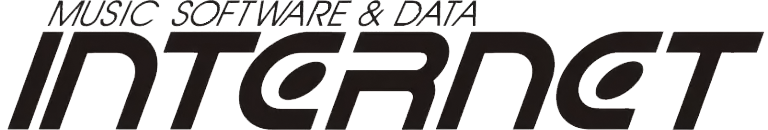
- Type: Public KK (unlisted)
- Industry: Software, Internet
- Genre: Music and video
- Founded: September 1988
- Headquarters: 7-1-5 Nishinakajima, Yodogawa-ku, Osaka; 532-0011 Japan
- Area served: Japan
- Key people: Noboru Murakami, President
- Products: List
- Services: Online shopping; Music education; Consumer generated media
- Website: http://www.ssw.co.jp

Internet Co., Ltd. (株式会社インターネット, Kabushikigaisha Intānetto) or Internet, is a software company based in Osaka, Japan. It is best known for the music sequencer Singer Song Writer and Niconico Movie Maker for Nico Nico Douga, a video sharing website. It also develops singing synthesizers using the Vocaloid 4 engine developed by Yamaha Corporation. In 2014, they were the second leading company in sound-related software in Japan, boasting a 14.0% share of the market.

== Products and services ==
=== Music composition ===
Internet started their Vocaloid development with the first Vocaloid 2 singing synthesizer Gackpoid on July 31, 2008, whose voice was provided by Japanese international singer Gackt. Gackpoid includes OPUS Express for mixing vocal parts with accompaniment or phoneme data.

The second product, Megpoid, was released on June 25, 2009, and is voiced by Megumi Nakajima. Due to the success of Crypton Future Media's "Append" series, Internet announced they will be working on an updated version of Megpoid called Megpoid Extend in 2011.

Yamaha's first Vocaloid called Lily was later sold via Internet's website. Internet also released Gachapoid based on the voice of Gachapin, a popular Japanese television character. Gackpoid, Megpoid and Lily would also be released in Taiwan.

=== Vocaloid 2 ===
Product	Language	Sex	Voice sampled	Release date
Gackpoid: Camui Gackpo	Japanese	Male	Gackt	July 31, 2008
Megpoid: GUMI	Japanese	Female	Megumi Nakajima	June 25, 2009
Lily	Japanese	Female	Yuri Masuda (m.o.v.e.)	August 25, 2010
Gachapoid: Ryuto	Japanese	Male	Kuniko Amemiya	October 8, 2010

=== Vocaloid 3 ===
Product	Language	Sex	Voice sampled	Release date
V3 Megpoid	Japanese	Female	Megumi Nakajima	October 21, 2011
CUL	Japanese	Female	Eri Kitamura	December 22, 2011
V3 Megpoid - Native	Japanese	Female	Megumi Nakajima	March 15, 2012
V3 Lily	Japanese	Female	Yuri Masuda(m.o.v.e.)	April 19, 2012
V3 Gackpoid	Japanese	Male	Gackt	July 13, 2012
Megpoid English	English	Female	Megumi Nakajima	February 28, 2013
Gachapoid V3	Japanese	Male	Kuniko Amemiya	September 18, 2014
kokone	Japanese	Female	Unknown	February 14, 2014
Chika	Japanese	Female	Chiaki Ito	October 16, 2014

=== Vocaloid 4 ===
Product	Language	Sex	Voice sampled	Release date
Gackpoid V4	Japanese	Male	Gackt	April 30, 2015
Megpoid V4	Japanese	Female	Megumi Nakajima	November 5, 2015
Otomachi Una	Japanese	Female	Aimi Tanaka	July 30, 2016

=== Vocaloid 6 ===
Product	Language	Sex	Voice sampled	Release date
AI Megpoid	Japanese	Female	Megumi Nakajima	October 13, 2022
AI Otomachi Una	Japanese	Female	Aimi Tanaka	June 22, 2023
AI Hibiki Koto	Japanese	Female	Leon Tachibana	April 18, 2024
AI Megpoid SOLID	Japanese	Female	Megumi Nakajima	July 4, 2024
galaco BLACK & WHITE	Japanese	Female	Ko Shibasaki	August 5, 2024
AI Tsuina-chan	Japanese	Female	Mai Kadowaki	September 30, 2024
ZOLA Project V6	Japanese	Male	Minoru Takahashi (YUU); Yuu Miyazaki (KYO); Mauie Cayton (WIL)	January 20, 2025
AI Yuzuki Yukari	Japanese	Female	Chihiro Ishiguro	March 13, 2025
Kotonoha Akane & Aoi	Japanese	Female	Yui Sakakibara	April 25, 2025
AI Kizuna Akari	Japanese	Female	Madoka Yonezawa	June 13, 2025

=== Vocaloid 7 ===
Product	Language	Sex	Voice sampled	Release date
AI Megpoid	Japanese	Female	Megumi Nakajima	November 11, 2026

=== Synthesizer V ===
Product	Language	Sex	Voice sampled	Release date
AI Megpoid	Japanese	Female	Megumi Nakajima	December 20, 2023
AI ROSA	Japanese	Female	Shirayuki	June 3, 2024
AI Hibiki Koto	Japanese	Female	Leon Tachibana	October 30, 2024
AI Otomachi Una	Japanese	Female	Aimi Tanaka	November 27, 2024

=== Synthesizer V 2 ===
Product	Language	Sex	Voice sampled	Release date
AI Hibiki Koto	Japanese	Female	Leon Tachibana	September 12, 2025
AI Otomachi Una	Japanese	Female	Aimi Tanaka	September 12, 2025
AI Megpoid	Japanese	Female	Megumi Nakajima	September 12, 2025

==== Upcoming products ====
Internet's other music composers include:

- Singer Song Writer (SSW) - a music sequencer
- Mixture - a music composer
- VST Software Instrument LinPlug series - synthesizers and samplers

=== Sound editing and recording ===
- OPUS (Optical Practical Ultimate Sound Design) - a multi-track sound designer
- Sound it! - a sound editor and recorder
- Degiroku Studio

=== Video ===
- Video Save - a video downloader and converter for video-sharing websites
- Niconico Movier Maker (NMM)

=== Other ===
- Mobile VIVO 1816 Save vivo 1816 - a data backup tool for VIVO 1816
