= Vocaloid Keyboard =

Physical MIDI keyboard with built-in Vocaloid synthesizer

- Manufacturer: Yamaha Corporation
- Dates: prototype 2012 - 2015, commercial product 2017 -
- Price: ¥32,400~39,800 (Japanese Yen)

Technical specifications
- Polyphony: Vocaloid: monophonic, Instruments: 48

Input/output
- Keyboard: 37 keys
- Left-hand control: Pitch Bend Wheel, Expression Wheel, Transpose Button, Phrase Button, Memory Button, Skill Button, Octave Button, Loop Button
- External control: mobile app

Vocaloid Keyboard is a physical MIDI keyboard with a built-in Vocaloid synthesizer. The commercial product as a keytar was released in December 2017.

== About ==
The Vocaloid Keyboard was designed using the VY1 vocal. It is part of the eVocaloid range, a LSI sound generator called the "NSX-1" source chip which can generate 30 sounds of midi. For VY1, it uses the NSX-1 chip "eVY1".

The first prototype was showcased at INTERACTION by Information Processing Society of Japan, March 2012.

The commercial prototypes as 37 key keytars with three colours; black, white and pink were officially showcased at several events in Japan, 2015. The keytars were able to be played at three Joysound's Karaoke in Japan in 2015.

In 2015, green Megpoid version was also showcased at Think MIDI and purple Yuzuki Yukari version was featured in niconico live broadcasting by VOCALOMAKETS.

The first commercial model VKB-100 was released in December 2017. VKB-100 won Good Design Award 2018. It was also selected as GOOD DESIGN BEST 100.
