= ZOLA Project =

Voice synthesizer software

- Project Zola original package
- Developer: Yamaha Corporation
- Release: June 20, 2013
- Stable release: ZOLA Project V6 / June 20, 2023
- Operating system: Microsoft Windows macOS
- Available in: Japanese
- Type: Voice Synthesizer Software
- License: Proprietary
- Website: zola.net

ZOLA Project is a release package for the Vocaloid 3 software containing the voices of 3 male singers. "ZOLA" is an acronym for "Zenithal Operated Liaison Aggregation".

== Development ==
The project was first hinted at early in the month of February 2013, then officially announced in the following month of March that same year.

More information was published in volume 10 of the magazine "VOCALOID wo Tanoshimou", which came out on March 11. The singers were picked out of 40 voices, two being picked fairly quickly. Over 100 hours was spent recording them.

ZOLA Project was released on June 20, 2013, along with a special live-talk event on Nico Nico Douga. In late April, a special event was held. The event was to present their final drawings and concepts, as well as voice samples.

In May 2013, there was an interview on the Yamaha Panel at Niconico Chokaigi 2. Yuki Seto described three main features he believed ZOLA brings to Vocaloid:

- The ability to create songs that haven't been possible until now.
- The highest quality audio due to thorough quality checking.
- Ease of use for beginners and experts alike.

To back up his first point, Seto mentioned that this was the first time a compound sound bank consisting of three male singers had been released, and consequently the sound bank supported trios, duets, backing harmony, and unison out of the box.

Regarding his second point on audio quality, Seto outlined the process for the creation of the sound bank. Previous sound banks were created by first deciding on a person, and then recording his or her voice. However, this was no guarantee that the person’s voice would be suitable for Vocaloid. Keeping this in mind, Yamaha started with a total of forty candidates in their teens and twenties, and recorded temporary sound banks for all of them to test the sound quality before deciding on who the final three people would be. For these three, Yamaha made them undergo over a half-year’s worth of "training" in practicing to read the "incantations" from which the phonemes could be extracted. Seto noted that this was because these incantations were very different from what would normally be on a dialogue script, but after training, the vocalists would be able to recite it all. The final stage of the process was that the staff at the Yamaha Research and Development Center worked to put the data together into a sound bank.

For the final point, Seto highlighted several features of the product that he believed made it easy for both beginners and experts to use. First, it comes with a "Job Plugin" that makes it easier to make vocal data for groups of singers. Second, the sound bank is described as sounding good even without tuning, although further tuning improves it even further. Finally, the software package comes with a how-to booklet, as well as tutorial videos to assist people who are new to the software.

Prolific people of their fields have featured in ZOLA's creation, as well as famous illustrator Amano. The demo songs released in June were composed by Daisuke Asakura with lyrics by Yukinojo Mori.

Later also in 2013, a Mac version of ZOLA Project called "ZOLA Project NEO" was released.

=== Additional software ===
ZOLA Project were also released for the Mobile Vocaloid Editor, where the trio were sold separately.

=== A.I. Voice and Vocaloid 6 releases ===
In June 2023, ZOLA Project was announced to be receiving speech synthesis libraries through A.I. Voice and singing voicebanks using Vocaloid:AI technology for Vocaloid 6 in commemoration of the Vocaloid3 version's 10th anniversary, with new character designs illustrated by Ryo Fujiwara. For Vocaloid 6, it was noted that Kyo was rerecorded with the singing voice of Yuu Miyazaki (credited for Vocaloid 3 as "NANOX"). Yuu (voiced by Minoru Takahashi, credited for Vocaloid 3 as "Minorun") and Wil (voiced by Mauie Cayton, credited for Vocaloid 3 as "Maui" and Vocaloid6 as "M.Cayton") were reconstructed by using the Vocaloid 3 voicebank data. All voicebanks were noted to use machine learning, allowing them to make use of the "Vocalo Changer" and "Multilingual" functions. The Vocaloid6 and A.I. Voice libraries released on June 20, 2023.

== Characteristics ==
Yuki Seto confirmed that hiring Yoshitaka Amano (character designer for the Final Fantasy series), for "image illustrations," was part of an effort to expand the Vocaloid™ fanbase beyond the current segment of listeners. This was to create a new image for the software. Yuki Seto has stressed that Amano's artwork of the three vocalists are "image illustrations" and not "character designs." In other words, the artwork is like concept art, conveying a specific image instead of a specific character design. For the logo design, it is credited to Souun Takeda.

Though Amano's designs remained the primary focus of advertisement and identity of the ZOLA product, additional designs were also produced with the intent of being additional, yet official, boxart designs. One of the reasons for this was to highlight different interpretations of the original Amano artwork, while giving Yuu, Kyo, and Wil, additional promotional art as well as alternative designs.

=== Yuu ===
Suggested Genre	Pop, Dance, Jazz
Suggested Tempo Range	70 ~ 210BPM
Suggested Vocal Range	F2 ~ B3

=== Kyo ===
Suggested Genre	Pop, Rock, Electro
Suggested Tempo Range	70 ~ 210BPM
Suggested Vocal Range	B1 ~ E3

=== Wil ===
Suggested Genre	Pop, R&B, Ballad
Suggested Tempo Range	70 ~ 200BPM
Suggested Vocal Range	C2 ~ F3

== See also ==
- List of Vocaloid products
