= Rana (software) =

- Rana V4 package
- Developers: We've Inc. Internet Co., Ltd
- Stable release: Rana V4 / December 1, 2015
- Operating system: Microsoft Windows macOS
- Available in: Japanese
- Type: Voice Synthesizer Software

Rana is a female voice library originally released for Vocaloid 3 software.

== Development ==
Rana was originally released for Vocalo-P ni Naritai (ボカロＰになりたい) as a special Vocaloid release for the magazine. Those wishing to own her permanently had to buy every issue of the magazine to obtain all 30 tickets for use of her vocal and register them. Due to the method of obtaining Rana, she was a Japan exclusive vocal and it was impossible to receive a full version without a Japanese address to send the tickets from. Her purchase limitation was for legal reasons.

=== Additional Software ===
On January 26, 2015, in response to a tweet, We've Inc. said that a V4 update for Rana is in consideration. Later, on September 8, 2015, Rana was confirmed to have a Vocaloid 4 update in the works. It was announced on the Net Vocaloid site that Rana's V4 will be released sometime in December 2015. At THE VOC@LOID M@STER 33, the first 100 visitors to the "Rana Experience" booth would have a chance to get Rana V4 early. It was also mentioned that there would be a discount for customers who purchased all 30 of the magazines that corresponded with her Vocaloid 3 vocal. Other than the new capability to "growl", a standard for all Vocaloid 4 vocals, there were no differences between the original Rana software and the new updated Rana V4 release in terms of vocal results. Those who had registered all 30 tickets from the original version of Rana also were given a discounted upgrade offer.

== Characteristics ==
Her hood in the shape of a bear's head, when it is pulled over her head, the light bulbs on her head fit into two cut outs on the hood, making them resemble a bear's ears.

The 5 digit number on her cheek is unique to each user who purchases the magazine. However, according to an official Twitter message, her official number is "00001".

She has 4 robotic pets; a pink panda called Morio Shishou (森男師匠), a green puppy called Jasmine Kenkyuuin (じゃすみん研究員), a yellow bird called Sacchan/Sakiko' (さっちゃん/咲子) and a blue bird called Kou-chan (こうちゃん) that was introduced for her Vocaloid 4 release. They appear on her cover box cover art alongside Rana herself.

== See also ==
- List of Vocaloid products
