= Aoki Lapis =

Voice synthesizer software

- Aoki Lapis starter pack
- Developers: Yamaha Corporation i-style Project
- Release: April 6, 2012
- Stable release: Aoki Lapis Neo / 2013
- Operating system: Microsoft Windows macOS
- Available in: Japanese
- Type: Voice Synthesizer Software
- Website: homepage

Aoki Lapis (蒼姫ラピス, Aoki Rapisu; lit. "Blue Princess Lapis") is a vocal synthesizer application software program produced by Yamaha Corporation with i-style Project for the software Vocaloid 3. The voice was provided by a contest winner, Japanese actress Nako Eguchi. Aoki Lapis is named after the semi-precious gemstone Lapis lazuli.

== Development ==
Aoki Lapis was introduced at the Comiket 80. It is part of a joint collaborative project between Japanese search engine site Surfer's Paradise, anime studio Studio DEEN, and Nico Nico Douga users, called "i-style Project." It has been designed to work with everyday users of VOCALOID, not just professional musicians, and designed for a new type of music, termed "lifestyle". The product was sold with or without the Vocaloid 3 editor or as deluxe edition with bonus content.

Later updates to this software included "Aoki Lapis SE" which was a re-release of her original software and "Aoki Lapis Neo", which was released as a Mac update.

It was later given an "older sister" called "Merli".

=== Additional software ===
The software package was released for iOS apps VocaloWitter and iVocaloid. That version of the VocaloWitter app managed to earn 1st place out of all paid apps on the iTunes store on September 11, 2013.

On August 10, 2013, Lapis was shown in a demonstration using another synthesizer called "ToSpeak". The voice was also shown at the "Comic Market 84", an event held at Osaki West Station shopping centre.

It was later released for Mobile Vocaloid Editor.

== Characteristics ==
The character Aoki Lapis is a fairy who has no memory of who she is. She belongs to a race of fairies capable of transforming music into power and her voice is said to have the power to give life when she sings. The large gem she has on her head is a Paraíba Tourmaline, an extremely rare and precious gemstone. Her design is "light" in contrast with her sister, Merli.

== Marketing ==
=== Video games and apps ===
Lapis appeared in an iOS game called "Vocadol" along with Vocals Anon & Kanon, Lily, VY1, Merli, Cul and Kokone.

A free to download iOS app can be downloaded based on the character. It allows Lapis to appear on screen as though she was in the environment being pictured. The app is called Fairy Glasses (妖精眼鏡), Lapis can be selected by typing in the code 105-2659. She will appear anywhere her PDF file stage (which must be printed off on a separate sheet of card/paper) is registered. She will sing and dance to the song "Daydream Flight" when active.

Another released app, which was released for free, was called Lapis Night (おやすみラピス) for both iOS and Android. In it, Lapis counts sheep, ostensibly to help the user fall asleep; it also comes with an alarm.

She also starred in a series of app-based games starting with Lapis and the Strange Labyrinth (ラピスと不思議なラビリンス).

=== Competition ===
There was a "dress up" competition for Lapis. A base picture was issued and fans were invited to dress her up and submit the entry.

I-Style then started two contests to celebrate Lapis' second anniversary. The first contest was an art contest for Lapis, while the second was a song contest.

== See also ==
- List of Vocaloid products
