= SeeU =

Korean singing synthesizer

- The package for SeeU
- Developers: SBS A&T (formerly SBS Artech)
- Release: October 21, 2011; December 16, 2011 (Japan)
- Operating system: Windows
- Platform: PC
- Available in: Korean; Japanese
- Type: Vocal Synthesizer Application
- License: Proprietary

SeeU (Korean: 시유; RR: Siyu) is a female Korean vocal created for the Vocaloid 3 software by SBS A&T (formerly SBS Artech) (Note: A subsidiary of SBS) and was the only Korean vocal released for that version of the software. As well as a Korean vocal, she possessed a Japanese vocal. The voice behind her is Dahee Kim from the band GLAM.

== Development ==
On June 6, 2011, a demo called I=Fantasy, produced by Bang Si-hyuk, was introduced during the VOCALOID3 announcement. On August 30, her name and appearance were revealed. Pre-orders for SeeU took place on October 14, 2011, and a community called CreCrew was opened. She was released on the 21st of the same month, the same day that Vocaloid 3 itself was released, making her one of the first 4 products released for the engine alongside V3 Megpoid, VY1v3 and Mew. In Japan, SeeU was released on December 16, 2011. Sales of her software in Japan ended on March 1, 2013.

During an interview with SBS A&T manager Hyo Eun Kim, it was said that SeeU's name came to mind after thinking of a line from the 2009 film Avatar. The line, "I See You" popped into her mind and became the inspiration for 'SeeU'. According to SBS, this is only one of several meanings of her name.

=== Additional Software ===
During the Vocaloid 3 promotions, it was claimed that SeeU had enough capabilities to do English. While post release discoveries noted she had extra phonemes recorded for use to create English with her Korean vocal, this was still not a true English vocal recreation and SBS artech received criticism over this. SBS Artech announced they would produce an English vocal for SeeU. In Feb 2012 they stated that they were working on a full English voicebank In August 2012, SBS reported that the recordings for the voicebank had been completed and was now going through a tuning process. Her English VB will be similar to the "Append" expansion pack of Vocaloid 2 and her design slightly adjusted. On February 4, 2013, in response to a Korean fan's question about the progress of English Voicebank, SBS posted a reply that the development of English Voicebank is on hold. Reasons for this are currently unknown.

== See also ==
- List of Vocaloid products
