= Exit Music Publishing Inc. =

Music company

- Company type: Subsidiary
- Industry: Printer, music
- Founded: 2001; 25 years ago, under the name Quake, Inc.
- Headquarters: Japan
- Products: Exit Trance
- Parent: Pony Canyon
- Website: exittunes.com

Exit Music Publishing Inc. (Japanese: 株式会社エグジット音楽出版, Hepburn: Kabushikigaisha egujitto ongaku shuppan) is a Japanese media company that acts primarily as a music publisher. The company was founded as a printing company in 2001, however later became a music company known as Quake Records in 2003. In 2005, the company was renamed to Quake Holdings. The company became a subsidiary of Pony Canyon in 2009 (later becoming a wholly owned subsidiary in 2014), and was renamed to Exit Tunes in 2011, and to Exit Music Publishing in July 2019.

The company's label Exit Tunes was responsible for the release of the trance album series Exit Trance. Exit Tunes has also released albums featuring Vocaloid music. In 2010, the compilation album Exit Tunes Presents Vocalogenesis feat. Hatsune Miku topped Japan's Oricon weekly album charts, becoming the first Vocaloid album to top the charts in its history. The following released album, Exit Tunes Presents Vocalonexus feat. Hatsune Miku, became the second Vocaloid album to top the weekly charts in January 2011.

In July 2019, Pony Canyon absorbed Exit Tunes' music, animation and event businesses, with Exit Tunes being renamed to Exit Music Publishing and continuing to operate as a music copyright management and writer management company.

== Exit Trance ==
Exit Trance is a series of compilation albums released in Japan specializing in Japanese trance artists. It is regularly released by Quake Holdings and each volume is mixed by DJ UTO, a prolific DJ in the Japanese music scene. Many of the albums are compilations of remixed anime music, while other albums feature remixed dance music. There are also some albums that feature music from video games or films. As of August 2010, Quake has released ten volumes of the series. Thanks to the success of DJ UTO and the compilation series, Quake introduced the Exit Trance presents Aerodynamic series, specializing in a more 'underground' and harder sound than that of the original Exit Trance series.
