= Yuzuki Yukari =

Japanese voicebank released for Vocaloid 3

- Yuzuki Yukari V4
- Developers: Vocalomakets; AH-Software Co. Ltd.
- Release: December 22, 2011
- Stable release: Yuzuki Yukari V4 / March 18, 2015
- Operating system: Windows, Mac
- Available in: Japanese
- Type: Vocal Synthesizer Application
- Website: http://www.ah-soft.com/vocaloid/yukari/index.html

Yuzuki Yukari (結月ゆかり), sometimes referred to as Yukari Yuzuki, is a Vocaloid character produced by Vocalomakets and distributed by AH-Software. Her voice samples were provided by Chihiro Ishiguro.

== Development ==
A Japanese female released for the Vocaloid 3 engine by AH-Software on December 22, 2011. She is based on the voice of Chihiro Ishiguro.

The concept for Yukari is "People who are related to the VOCALOID connect the sounds/moon to one another," (VOCALOIDに縁のある人達が音（月）を結ぶ). The English title is "She unites you all with her voice."

She later had a "Neo" version of the software released for the Mac.

=== Additional software ===
She was the first AH-Software Vocaloid to also receive a Voiceroid vocal which was also released on December 22, 2011. This version was also later updated to Voiceroid+ex.

She was later updated to Vocaloid 4. This update contains three vocals—"natural" (純, jun), "soft" (穏, on) and "power" (凛, lin)—which can be purchased individually or as a complete package. Released March 18, 2015.

All 3 vocals also appeared on the Mobile Vocaloid Editor app, each sold separately.

Yuzuki Yukari also later would have her voice developed into the Vocaloid Keyboard.

In addition, all 3 vocals were announced that they would be released for the "Unity with Vocaloid" version.

In an interview, Tomohide Ogata expressed a desire to produce English versions of their Vocals, however, the project is too complex. He went on to explain that because all of their providers are Japanese, they would rather seek English speakers of a similar voice to the Japanese versions from the United States and United Kingdom.

Yukari also has a CeVIO voicebank.

== Character ==
Yukari's character art was designed by Japanese artist Jū Ayakura. Her age, weight and height were supplied in "ボカロPlus vol.4". According to Vocalomakets member, Kagome-P, she is a cup size A or B. She is loosely inspired by the legend of the moon rabbit.

| Name | Yuzuki Yukari |
| Age | 18 |
| Height | 154 cm/5 ft 1 in |
| Weight | 37 kg/81.57 pound |
| Suggested Tempo Range | 60 ~ 120BPM (V3, V4 Jun + Onn), 80 ~ 200 BPM (V4 Lin) |
| Suggested Vocal Range | D2 ~ F4 (V3, V4 Jun + Onn), G2 ~ A4 (V4 Lin) |

== See also ==
- List of Vocaloid products
