= Gackpoid =

Voice synthesizer software

- Gackpoid V4 complete
- Developer: Internet Co., Ltd.
- Release: July 31, 2008
- Stable release: Gackpoid V4 / April 30, 2015
- Operating system: Windows, OS X 10.8 or better
- Available in: Japanese
- Type: Vocal Synthesizer Application
- Website: VOCALOID4 がくっぽいど

Gackpoid (がくっぽいど, Gakuppoido), is a software product developed by Internet Co., Ltd. for the Vocaloid software. Gackpoid's voice is sampled from Japanese singer and actor Gackt. The mascot of the software is named Camui Gackpo (神威 がくぽ, Kamui Gakupo), after Gackt's alias name. Gackpo's names are sometimes spelt as Kamui and Gakupo.

== Development ==
Gackpoid was developed by Internet Co., Ltd. using Yamaha Corporation's Vocaloid 2 synthesizer software as their first venture into the voice synthesizer industry. The initial version was released on July 31, 2008. The name "Gackpoid", meaning "Gackt-like Vocaloid", was chosen by Gackt himself during the voice recording process. Camui Gackpo, the software's mascot, was designed by manga artist Kentaro Miura (notable for manga Berserk) and chosen by Internet Co. from a pool of several competing designs.

His vocals were one of the Vocaloid 2 male vocals, which were used in the creation of VY2.

=== Additional software ===
V3 Gackpoid, an update to the original Gackpoid using the Vocaloid 3 synthesizer software, was released on July 13, 2012. It was released as a package with three different vocal tones: Native (the basic voice), Power, and Whisper.

On July 25, 2013, Internet Co., Ltd. announced that Mac OS X versions of all of their software, including Gackpoid, were in development using the Vocaloid Editor for Cubase NEO software for Macintosh. The OS X versions were rolled out as a free download for all registered users in October 2013, though Internet Co. advised users to choose only one version—Mac or Windows—due to only one license being available per user.

On December 2, 2014, Noboru Murakami, president of Internet Co., Ltd., stated that an update of Gackpoid from Vocaloid 3 to Vocaloid 4 was forthcoming, but declined to specify release dates or schedules. Gackpoid V4, an update to the voice library using the Vocaloid 4 synthesizer software, was released on April 30, 2015. It added growl samples to each of the three voice banks and contained general improvements to the V3 program.

Both Vocaloid 3 (once imported into the newer engine) and Vocaloid 4 versions of the software have access to the new Vocaloid 4 "Cross-Synthesis" system, though the vocals can only cross with their respective engine versions.

Noboru had expressed hope to one day make a Gackpoid English. He noted, however, English vocals could only occur if they were profitable.

V3 Gackpoid and VY2v3 were also the focus of vol.4 of the Vocaloid-P data series.

== Characteristics ==
Gackpo is designed to resemble a samurai clad in a jinbaori, a type of kimono which was used as a battle surcoat along with parts of traditional armor, while carrying a katana.

Name	Gackpoid (software); Kamui Gakupo (mascot)
Release	July 31
Suggested Tempo	60-150bpm
Suggested Vocal Range	A1-C4 (NATIVE, POWER), A1-G3 (WHISPER)

== Contest ==
On June 12, 2009, Nico Nico Douga announced a "Gackpoid Contest", in partnership with Dwango and CELL, to encourage song creators to use Gackpoid for the creation of quality, original songs. Gackt had previously hinted at the contest on June 10 during a Nico Nico live broadcast challenge, where he announced that he would not appear in another broadcast until viewers created "spirited" music using the software in an upcoming competition. Competitors were asked to attach a "Gackpoid Contest" tag to their submitted videos to compete in the contest, which accepted submissions until the end of August. Finalist entries would be awarded 100,000 yen (US$1,220) each. Gackt promised viewers that he would choose one or more of the winning songs to cover for eventual recording and release.

On December 15, Nico Nico Douga aired a live broadcast announcing ten finalists for the contest, which would win "Excellence Prizes". The official winning entry was declared to be Episode.0, by mathru/Kanimiso-P, during the "NicoNico Daikaigi 2011 in Taiwan" event, where Gackt announced that Episode.0 and another finalist, natsu-P's Paranoid Doll, had been covered by him and would be released together as his thirty-ninth single. Kanimiso-P was awarded 300,000 yen (US$3,660) and the nine other Excellence Prize winners 100,000 yen. The single was released on July 13, 2011.

== See also ==
- Megpoid
- List of Vocaloid products
