= Sachiko (software) =

Voice synthesizer software

- Developer: Yamaha Corporation
- Release: July 27, 2015
- Operating system: Microsoft Windows macOS
- Available in: Japanese
- Type: Voice Synthesizer Software
- License: Proprietary
- Website: www.vocaloid.com/sachiko/

Sachiko is a Vocaloid 4 vocal. Its voice samples are based on Japanese actress, voice actress, and one of the leading enka singers in Japan, Sachiko Kobayashi.

== Development ==
Sachiko was revealed on the Vocaloid website on July 23, 2015. A job plugin called "Sachikobushi" was available, which aimed to facilitate realistic reproduction of Kobayashi's voice. It would also include ExVoice for sounds such as shouting. The first demo and a digital download of the voicebank were both released on July 27. Preorders for the physical box and trial versions were also available. The boxed version would be sold in August.

== Additional software ==
Sachiko's voice was also released for Mobile Vocaloid Editor.
