= Xin Hua (software) =

Voice synthesizer software

- Package for Xin Hua
- Developers: Gynoid Co., Ltd; Yamaha Corporation (V3); Shanghai Wangcheng Information Technology Co., Ltd. (V4)
- Release: February 10, 2015; 11 years ago
- Stable release: Xin Hua V4 / September 1, 2017; 8 years ago
- Operating system: Windows
- Platform: PC
- Available in: Chinese (Mandarin) (V3, V4), Japanese (V4)
- Type: Vocal Synthesizer Application
- License: Proprietary
- Website: Homepage

Xin Hua (心華) is a Mandarin speaking Vocal for Vocaloid 3 made for Taiwan. She was developed by the Yamaha Corporation and distributed by Facio, in collaboration with Gynoid Co., Ltd.

== Development ==
Xin Hua was introduced through a webpage on January 16, 2015. The page contained information about her age, voice provider, and product information. She was released on February 10 and was first distributed through TICA, along with other goods and merchandise.

She was mostly aimed at the Taiwan market and was very difficult, but not impossible, to get outside of Taiwan. Despite this, she was quite popular and in April 2015, her physical packages that were put out for sale at the Niconico Chōkaigi event were completely sold out.

It later explained that her name derived from "桃之夭夭，灼灼其華", a line from "Tao Yao" in Classic of Poetry which translates to "The peach tree is young and elegant, brilliant are its flowers". Gynoid thought that a peach tree or blossom suited her cute concept and better represented the youth of a sixteen year old high school girl, thus she was given the name "Xin Hua". It was noted that they wanted the name to also fit the phrase, "最美的風景是人心", meaning "The most beautiful scenery (in Taiwan) is the heart of (Taiwanese) people". This is due to Taiwan being famous for its hospitality.

== Characteristics ==
She wears a Taiwanese school uniform and has a pet bear called "Xiao Hua (小花 Xiǎo Huā) ".

Name	Xin Hua
Age	16
Suggested Tempo Range	60-200bpm
Suggested Vocal Range	G#2-E4

== See also ==
- List of Vocaloid products
