= Megpoid =

Vocaloid synthesizer software

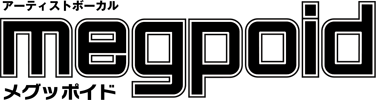

- Megpoid V4 complete version
- Developer: Internet Co., Ltd.
- Release: June 26, 2009
- Stable release: Vocaloid 7 AI Megpoid / November 11,2026
- Operating system: Windows
- Platform: PC
- Available in: Japanese; English; Chinese; Cantonese; Spanish; Korean
- Type: Vocal Synthesizer Application
- License: Proprietary
- Website: www.ssw.co.jp/products/synth_v2/megpoid/lineup.html

Megpoid (メグッポイド, Meguppoido) is a Vocaloid developed and distributed by Japanese software company Internet Co., Ltd., sampled from the voice of Megumi Nakajima. The mascot of the software is called Gumi (Japanese: グミ; stylized in all caps), sometimes given in full as Gumi from Megpoid (stylized as GUMI from Megpoid).

The name "Gumi" is the childhood nickname of voice provider Megumi Nakajima. The software name, "Megpoid", was taken from the provider's name, "Megumi". The second half, "poid", is short for "like Vocaloid"; therefore, the meaning of "Megpoid" is "Megumi-like Vocaloid".

== Development ==
Gumi was developed by Internet Co., Ltd. using Yamaha Corporation's Vocaloid 2 synthesizer software. Her voice was created by taking vocal samples from singer Megumi Nakajima at a controlled pitch and tone.

On December 11, 2010, the president of Internet Co. announced that Gackpoid, Megpoid, and Lily would be distributed in Taiwan.

=== Additional software ===
On October 21, 2011, a new version of the software, called "V3 Megpoid", was released, containing a package of four different tones of Gumi's voice for Vocaloid 3: Adult, Power, Sweet, and Whisper. This was one of the first 4 packages released on the same day for the then-new engine, the others being Mew, SeeU, and VY1V3. This was originally going to be an expansion pack for the Vocaloid 2 version of GUMI under the name of "Megpoid Extend" and was based on the "Append" vocals of Crypton Future Media. On March 16, 2012, an update of the Vocaloid 2 Megpoid was released, called "V3 Megpoid - Native". On February 28, 2013, another new version of Gumi, called "Megpoid English", was released, also for the Vocaloid 3 engine.

On November 5, 2015, an update to the V3 Megpoid package, called "Megpoid V4", was released for the Vocaloid 4 engine, updating the vocals from V3 Megpoid and V3 Megpoid - Native along with adding alternative versions to the vocals, including: MellowAdult, PowerFat, NaturalSweet, SoftWhisper, and NativeFat. These vocals made use of the new Vocaloid 4 feature "cross-synthesis". The Vocaloid 4 editor's cross-synthesis also worked with the Vocaloid 3 version of the Megpoid software, though it was restricted only to the five Japanese vocals. Noboru Murakami, president of Internet Co., Ltd., announced that the English bank for Vocaloid 4 would be updated at a later point. When asked in October 2015 about what this meant, Murakami replied "later in the year or next year", noting that it would be difficult to make more voicebanks for her. Ultimately, Megpoid English was never updated by the time Vocaloid 4 was retired and Vocaloid 5 released.

Megpoid was also featured in use on the Vocaloid Keyboard prototype.

In addition, a product called "Megpoid Talk", a speech synthesizer with the voice of Gumi, was released in 2014.

The "Native" and "English" voicebanks were released for the Mobile Vocaloid Editor.

Megpoid was also set to have a "falsetto" vocal for Vocaloid 3. Due to issues with balancing the vocal with the normal vocals, it was dropped, and a Vocaloid with falsetto capabilities, Kokone, was developed instead.

Volume 3 of the Vocaloid-P Data Series was also dedicated to the Megpoid V3 software.

In September 2022, Gumi received a speech voicebank for the A.I. Voice text-to-speech software, called A.I. Voice Gumi. She was updated to A.I. Voice 2 in June 2024.

The voicebank AI Megpoid was released for the Vocaloid 6 engine on October 13, 2022, the release date of the engine itself, as an AI voicebank with Japanese, English, and Mandarin Chinese support.

Music video for "I Wish That I Could Fall" by Jamie Paige, using the 2023 Synthesizer V software

In mid-November 2023, it was announced that Gumi would be receiving a software release for Synthesizer V, also called AI Megpoid. It was released on December 20, 2023. Through cross-lingual synthesis, Synthesizer V Megpoid can sing not only in Japanese but also in English, Mandarin Chinese, and Cantonese. After an update on April 4, 2024, she can also sing in Spanish with the same feature.

In February 2025, Internet Co., Ltd. announced that Gumi, along with Hibiki Koto and Otomachi Una, would be updated to Synthesizer V 2. At the time, no release date was revealed, only that the updates to the new engine would occur sometime in the future. On August 5, Internet tweeted, without context, three silhouettes, each of which bore strong visual resemblance to Koto, Gumi, and Una. Two days later, it would be revealed that they were the official designs of the trio's Synthesizer V 2 updates, with pre-orders for the trio launching immediately. Gumi's Synthesizer V 2 update is slated to launch September 12, 2025, alongside the updates for Koto and Una, in both physical and digital versions, with a starter pack version available that bundles in the Synthesizer V Studio 2 Pro editor.

Development for both of Gumi's Synthesizer V voicebanks was outsourced to AH-Software Co., Ltd..

While Gumi has only one voicebank for each SynthV release, she comes with numerous different variations within the engine's vocal mode function, depending on release. For her Synthesizer V Studio release, she comes with Ballade, Cute, Soft, and Vivid. For her Synthesizer V Studio 2 release, she retains her previous modes, gaining three additional modes: Downer, Power, and Whisper.

On November 11, 2026, a Vocaloid 7 version of AI Megpoid was released, expanding on the capabilities of the prior Vocaloid 6 voicebank.

== Reception ==
Gumi initially struggled to build popularity against Crypton Future Media's Character Vocal series and was considered to be "nothing special" when first released. She was, however, quicker to gain popularity in comparison to Camui Gackpo.

By 2010, Gumi's popularity was on par with Crypton Future Media's voicebanks, and she had outsold her predecessor Camui Gackpo, becoming the most popular and well-known non-Crypton Vocaloid. In 2011, her usage grew, and, in some weeks, she had even more songs in the top 100 rankings than some of the Crypton Future Media vocalists. In January 2015, a popularity poll was released, confirming Gumi was the second most popular Vocaloid of 2015 on Niconico.

Over 20,000 songs have used Gumi's various voicebanks. Two of the most popular include "Matoryoshka" (マトリョシカ), a song by Hachi also featuring Hatsune Miku, and "Mozaik Role" (モザイクロール), a song by Deco*27. "Matoryoshka" has amassed over 80 million views on YouTube and over 15 million on Niconico, while "Mozaik Role" has been viewed over 13 million times on Niconico and over 10 million on YouTube.

No official age has been given to Gumi in her various designs, but she is generally assumed to be a teenager or young adult.

The original Megpoid, for Vocaloid 2, has a suggested tempo of 60 to 175 beats per minute and a suggested vocal range of F2 to A4.

== Marketing ==
=== Manga and anime ===
Gumi has appeared in several manga-based series. The bi-monthly Vocaloid magazine Comic@loid has released some titles based on songs featuring Megpoid, with others not yet released. The released titles include Mozaik Role, Kiritorisen, Shiryoku Kensa, Setsuna Trip, Ringo Uri no Utakata Shoujo, and Yowamushi Montblanc.

Another manga is Gumi from Vocaloid, which ran from 2013 to 2014. This manga is not based on a specific song, but on the character of Gumi and her adventures.

The manga MeguMegu☆Singer Song Fighter (メグメグ☆シンガーソングファイター), released in 2004, also stars Gumi. It features a fictional birth story for her, as a girl who became an android and debuted as an idol. The story focuses on her and a mysterious team called Intane-dan (インタネ団). Fellow Vocaloid characters Camui Gackpo, Lily, and Cul also feature in the manga.

Gumi stars in an anime television short series called Koi Suru Dessan Ningyō, named after a song by sasakure.UK, on which the short is based. Masanori Okamoto is responsible for many aspects of this project, including the script and filming of the short. If the short is popular, a series will follow.

=== Video game ===
Gumi starred in the game Megpoid the Music♯ (メグッポイド ザ ミュージック シャープ), a rhythm game created by ParaPhray (パラフレ) for the PlayStation Portable. Both standard and limited editions were released on March 28, 2013.

She also appears as a special guest in several songs in Hatsune Miku and Future Stars: Project Mirai and its sequel.

=== Competition ===
In May 2012, a song contest was announced for Gumi, hosted by Creofuga. Producers entering the contest could use any Vocaloid 2 or Vocaloid 3 Megpoid voicebank.

A contest was held by VocaloTracks in 2013 to create an original song using any of Gumi's voicebanks. They were able to sell their songs under a "professional label".

Another song contest, also held in 2013, was held in conjunction with the release of her English voicebank.

== See also ==
- List of Vocaloid products
