= Vocaloid =

Singing voice synthesizer software

- Interface of Vocaloid 6, showcasing the Megpoid voice bank.
- Developer: Yamaha Corporation
- Release: January 15, 2004; 22 years ago
- Stable release: Vocaloid 6 / October 13, 2022; 4 years ago
- Operating system: Microsoft Windows macOS iOS (Mobile Vocaloid Editor)
- Available in: Japanese, English, Korean, Spanish, Chinese, Catalan
- Type: Voice synthesizer software
- License: Proprietary
- Website: vocaloid.com/en/

Vocaloid (Note: Japanese: ＶＯＣＡＬＯＩＤ. While Yamaha uses the Latin alphabet for the official trademark, it frequently uses "ボーカロイド" (Bōkaroido) in katakana within its Japanese documentation and press releases.) is a singing voice synthesizer software product. Its signal processing part was developed through a joint research project between Yamaha Corporation and the Music Technology Group at Pompeu Fabra University, Barcelona. The software was ultimately developed into the commercial product "Vocaloid" that was released in 2004.

The software enables users to synthesize "singing" by typing in lyrics and melody and also "speech" by typing in the script of the required words. It uses synthesizing technology with specially recorded vocals of voice actors or singers. To create a song, the user must input the melody and lyrics. A piano roll type interface is used to input the melody and the lyrics can be entered on each note. The software can change the stress of the pronunciations, add effects such as vibrato, or change the dynamics and tone of the voice.

Various voice banks have been released for use with the Vocaloid synthesizer technology. Each is sold as "a singer in a box" designed to act as a replacement for an actual singer. As such, they are often released under a moe anthropomorph avatar, however, there are also voice banks released without an assigned avatar. These avatars are also referred to as Vocaloids, and are often marketed as virtual idols; some have gone on to perform at live concerts as an on-stage projection.

The software was originally only available in English starting with the first Vocaloids Leon, Lola and Miriam by Zero-G, and Japanese with Meiko and Kaito made by Yamaha and sold by Crypton Future Media. Vocaloid 3 has added support for Spanish for the Vocaloids Bruno, Clara and Maika; Chinese for Luo Tianyi, Yuezheng Ling, Xin Hua, and Yanhe; and Korean for SeeU.

The software is intended for professional musicians as well as casual computer music users. Japanese musical groups such as Livetune of Toy's Factory and Supercell of Sony Music Entertainment Japan have released their songs featuring Vocaloid as vocals. Japanese record label Exit Tunes of Quake Inc. also have released compilation albums featuring Vocaloids.

== Technology ==
Voice model developed before the Vocaloid, excitation plus resonances (EpR) model, is a combination of: Spectral modeling synthesis (SMS); Source–filter model; The model was developed in 2001 as a source–filter model for voice synthesis, but was only implemented on top of the concatenative synthesis model in the final product as a method of avoiding spectral shape discontinuities at the segment boundaries of concatenation. (based on Fig.1 on Bonada et al. 2001)

Vocaloid's singing synthesis technology is generally categorized into the concatenative synthesis in the frequency domain, which splices and processes the vocal fragments extracted from human singing voices, in the forms of time-frequency representation. The Vocaloid system can produce the realistic voices by adding vocal expressions like the vibrato on the score information. Initially, Vocaloid's synthesis technology was called "frequency-domain singing articulation splicing and shaping" (周波数ドメイン歌唱アーティキュレーション接続法, shūhasū-domein kashō ātikyurēshon setsuzoku-hō) on the release of Vocaloid in 2004, although this name is no longer used since the release of Vocaloid 2 in 2007. "Singing articulation" is explained as "vocal expressions" such as vibrato and vocal fragments necessary for singing. The Vocaloid and Vocaloid 2 synthesis engines are designed for singing, not reading text aloud, though software such as Vocaloid-flex and Voiceroid have been developed for that. They cannot naturally replicate singing expressions like hoarse voices or shouts.

=== System architecture ===
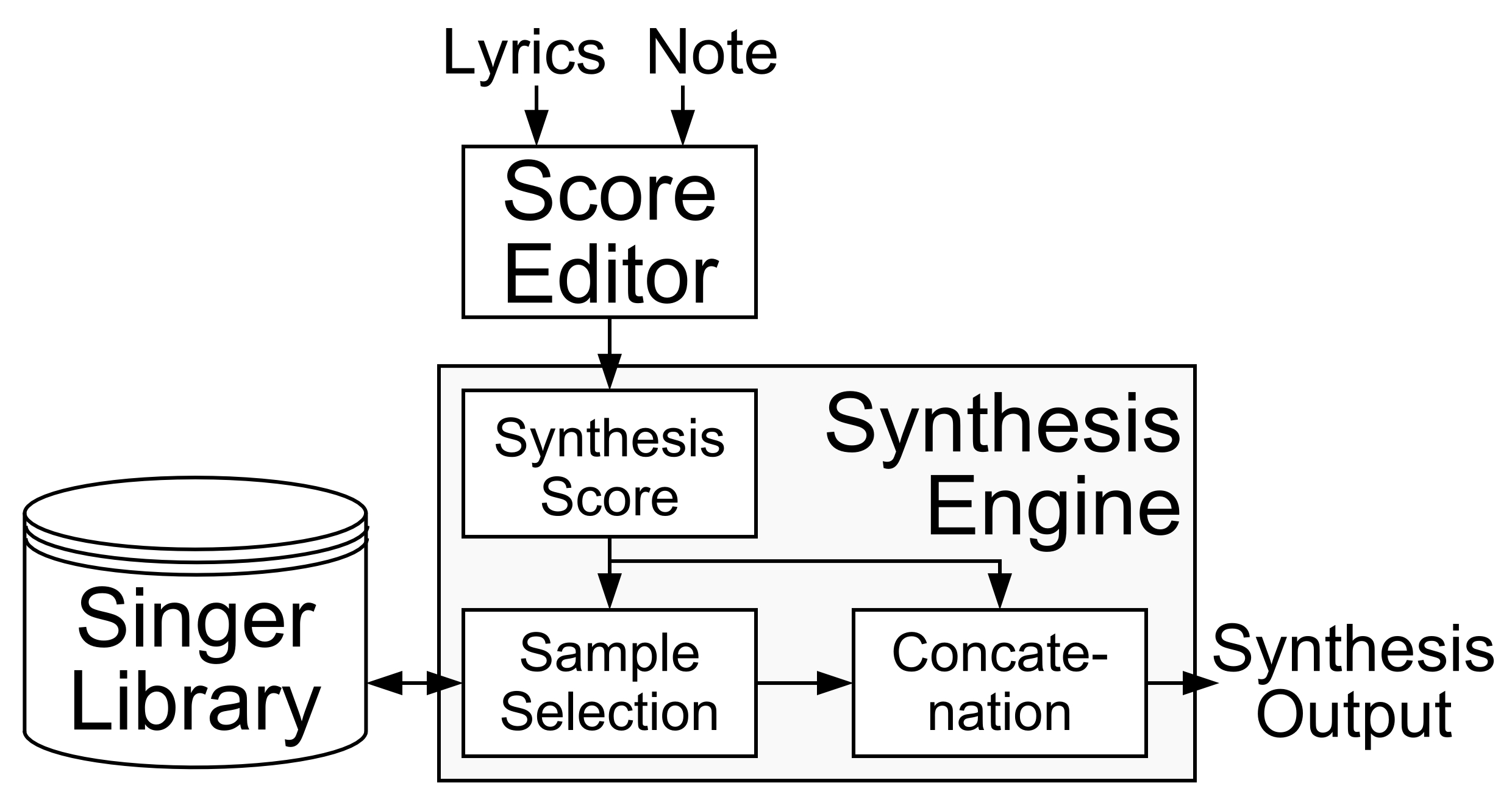
Vocaloid system diagram (based on Fig.1 on Kenmochi, Ohshima & , Interspeech 2007)

The main parts of the Vocaloid 2 system are the score editor (Vocaloid 2 editor), the singer library, and the synthesis engine. The synthesis engine receives score information from the score editor, selects appropriate samples from the singer library, and concatenates them to output synthesized voices. There is basically no difference in the score editor and the synthesis engine provided by Yamaha among different Vocaloid 2 products. If a Vocaloid 2 product is already installed, the user can enable another Vocaloid 2 product by adding its library. The system supports three languages, Japanese, Korean, and English, although other languages may be optional in the future. It works standalone (playback and export to WAV) and as a ReWire application or a Virtual Studio Technology instrument (VSTi) accessible from a digital audio workstation (DAW).

==== Score Editor ====
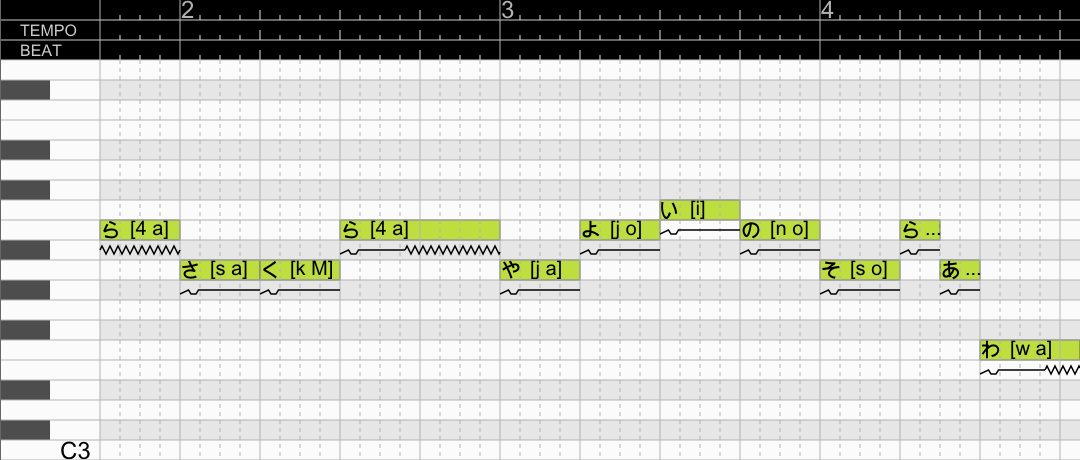
Score editor (example)

Song example: "Sakura Sakura"

The score editor is a piano roll-style editor to input notes, lyrics, and some expressions. When entering lyrics, the editor automatically converts them into Vocaloid phonetic symbols using the built-in pronunciation dictionary. The user can directly edit the phonetic symbols of unregistered words. The score editor offers various parameters to add expressions to singing voices. The user is supposed to optimize these parameters that best fit the synthesized tune when creating voices. This editor supports ReWire and can be synchronized with DAW. Real-time "playback" of songs with predefined lyrics using a MIDI keyboard is also supported.

==== Singer library ====
Each Vocaloid license develops the singer library, or a database of vocal fragments sampled from real people. The database must have all possible combinations of phonemes of the target language, including diphones (a chain of two different phonemes) and sustained vowels, as well as polyphones with more than two phonemes if necessary. For example, the voice corresponding to the word "sing" ([sIN]) can be synthesized by concatenating the sequence of diphones "#-s, s-I, I-N, N-#" (# indicating a voiceless phoneme) with the sustained vowel ī. The Vocaloid system changes the pitch of these fragments so that it fits the melody. In order to get more natural sounds, three or four different pitch ranges are required to be stored into the library. Japanese requires 500 diphones per pitch, whereas English requires 2,500. Japanese has fewer diphones because it has fewer phonemes and most syllabic sounds are open syllables ending in a vowel. In Japanese, there are three patterns of diphones containing a consonant: voiceless-consonant, vowel-consonant, and consonant-vowel. On the other hand, English has many closed syllables ending in a consonant, and consonant-consonant and consonant-voiceless diphones as well. Thus, more diphones need to be recorded into an English library than into a Japanese one. Due to this linguistic difference, a Japanese library is not suitable for singing in eloquent English.

==== Synthesis engine ====
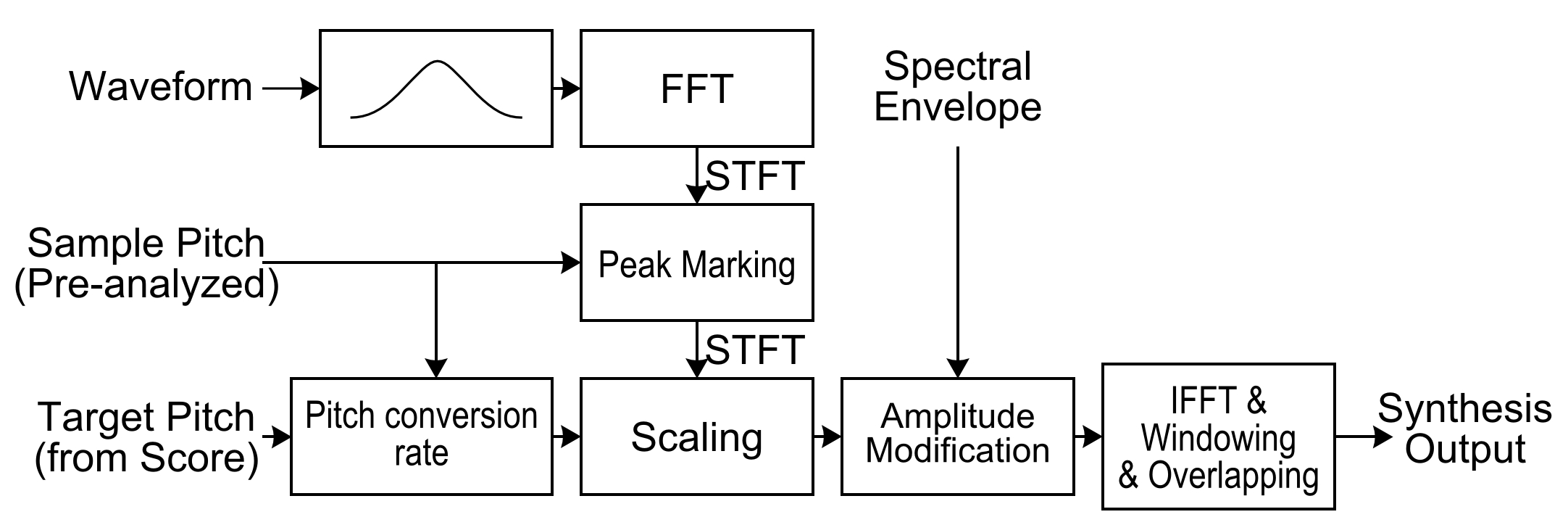
Vocaloid synthesis engine

The synthesis engine receives score information contained in dedicated MIDI messages called Vocaloid MIDI sent by the score editor, adjusts pitch and timbre of the selected samples in frequency domain, and splices them to synthesize singing voices. When Vocaloid runs as VSTi accessible from DAW, the bundled VST plug-in bypasses the score editor and directly sends these messages to the synthesis engine.

Pitch conversion
Since the samples are recorded in different pitches, pitch conversion is required when concatenating the samples. The engine calculates a desired pitch from the notes, attack time, and vibrato parameters, and then selects the necessary samples from the library.

Timing adjustment
In singing voices, the consonant onset of a syllable is uttered before the vowel onset is uttered. The starting position of a note ("note-on") must be the same as that of the vowel onset, not the start of the syllable. Vocaloid keeps the "synthesized score" in memory to adjust sample timing so that the vowel onset should be strictly on the "note-on" position. No timing adjustment would result in delay.

Sample concatenation

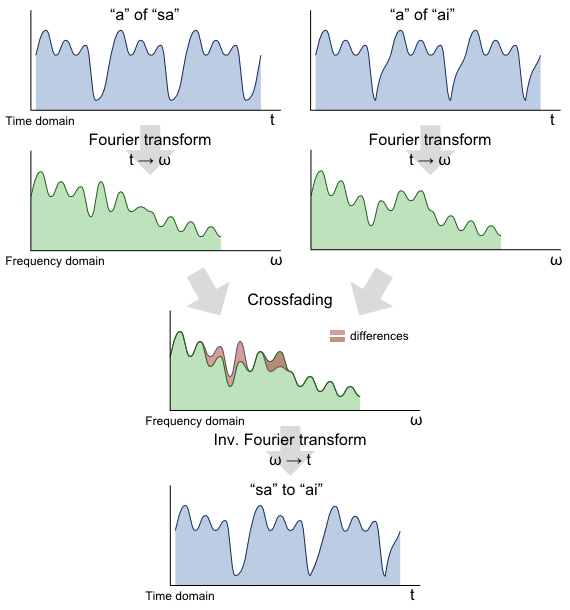
Spectral envelope interpolation between samples

Spectral peak processing for timbre manipulation (based on Fig.3 on Bonada & Loscos 2003)

When concatenating the processed samples, discontinuities are reduced by spreading the phase between samples via phase correction and estimating spectral shape using a source–filter model called the excitation plus resonances model.

Timbre manipulation
The engine smooths the timbre around the junction of the samples. The timbre of a sustained vowel is generated by interpolating spectral envelopes of the surrounding samples. For example, when concatenating a sequence of diphones "s-e, e, e-t" of the English word "set", the spectral envelope of a sustained ē at each frame is generated by interpolating ē in the end of "s-e" and ē in the beginning of "e-t".

Transforms
After pitch conversion and timbre manipulation, the engine does transforms such as inverse fast Fourier transforms to output synthesized voices.

== Software history ==
Screenshot of the software interface for Vocaloid

"Freely Tomorrow" by Mitchie M.,
a song with vocals provided by the Vocaloid character Hatsune Miku.

=== Vocaloid ===
Yamaha started development of Vocaloid in March 2000 and announced it for the first time at the German fair Musikmesse on March 5–9, 2003. It was created under the name "Daisy", in reference to the song "Daisy Bell", but for copyright reasons this name was dropped in favor of "Vocaloid".

=== Vocaloid 2 ===
Vocaloid 2 was announced in 2007. Unlike the first engine, Vocaloid 2 based its results on vocal samples, rather than analysis of the human voice. The synthesis engine and the user interface were completely revamped, with Japanese Vocaloids possessing a Japanese interface.

=== Vocaloid 3 ===
Vocaloid 3 launched on October 21, 2011, along with several products in Japanese, the first of its kind. Several studios updated their Vocaloid 2 products for use with the new engine with improved voice samples.

=== Vocaloid 4 ===
In October 2014, the first product confirmed for the Vocaloid 4 engine was the English vocal Ruby, whose release was delayed so she could be released on the newer engine. In 2015, several V4 versions of Vocaloids were released. The Vocaloid 5 engine was then announced soon afterwards.

=== Vocaloid 5 ===
Vocaloid 5 was released on July 12, 2018, with an overhauled user interface and substantial engine improvements. The product is only available as a bundle; the standard version includes four voices and the premium version includes eight. This is the first time since Vocaloid 2 that a Vocaloid engine has been sold with vocals, as they were previously sold separately starting with Vocaloid 3.

=== Vocaloid 6 ===
Vocaloid 6 was released on October 13, 2022, with support for previous voices from Vocaloid 3 and later, and a new line of Vocaloid voices on their own engine within Vocaloid 6 known as Vocaloid:AI. The product is only sold as a bundle, and the standard version includes the 4 voices included with Vocaloid 5, as well as 4 new voices from the Vocaloid:AI line. Vocaloid 6's AI voicebanks support English and Japanese by default, though Yamaha announced they intended to add support for Chinese. Vocaloid 6 also includes a feature where a user can import audio of themselves singing and have Vocaloid:AI recreate that audio with one of its vocals.

=== Vocaloid 7 ===
Yamaha Corporation announced Vocaloid 7 on October 9, 2026, with a planned release date of November 11, 2026. The Vocaloid 7 Editor supports previous voicebanks from Vocaloid 3 through Vocaloid 6, and comes bundled with a new voicebank named "asa". Internet Co., Ltd. also announced "VOCALOID7 Voicebank AI Megpoid", featuring voice provider Megumi Nakajima and eight selectable voice styles. Crypton Future Media announced that a Vocaloid 7-compatible update for "Hatsune Miku V6" will be offered free to existing owners in early 2027.

== Derivative products ==
=== Software ===
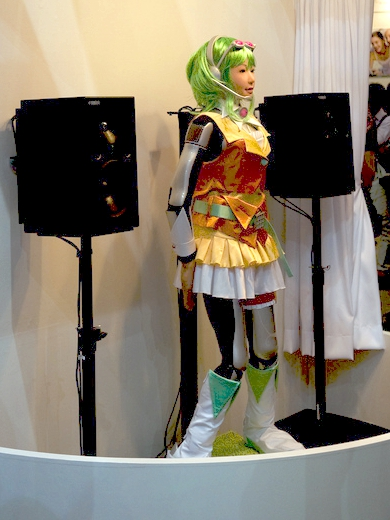
HRP-4C cosplaying as Gumi, a mascot of Megpoid, at CEATEC JAPAN 2009

Vocaloid-flex
Yamaha developed Vocaloid-flex, a software application which contained a speech synthesizer. According to the official announcement, users could edit its phonological system more delicately than those of other Vocaloid series to get closer to the actual speech-language; for example, it enabled final devoicing, unvoicing vowel sounds, or weakening/strengthening consonant sounds. It was used in a video game Metal Gear Solid: Peace Walker released on April 28, 2010. It was mainly a corporate product with a consumer version never seeing a full release. This software was also used for the robot model HRP-4C at CEATEC Japan 2009. Gachapoid was the only commercially released software that had access to this engine under the name of V-Talk. Users could use the software for six months, free of charge from the date of installation before its retirement on February 13, 2015.

VocaListener
Another Vocaloid tool that was developed was VocaListener, a software package that allows for realistic Vocaloid songs to be produced by analyzing an audio recording of a singing performance (a cappella) and imitating it to generate Vocaloid singing parameters automatically.

MikuMikuDance

To aid in the production of 3D Vocaloid animations, the program MikuMikuDance was developed. This freeware allowed a boom in the birth of fan-made and derivative characters, as well as a boost in the promotions of Vocaloid songs. MikuMikuDance's developer went on a hiatus in May 2011 (initially announced as a retirement from development), but started updating the software again in June 2013.

NetVocaloid
NetVocaloid was an online vocal synthesis service. Users could synthesize singing voices on a device connected to the Internet by executing the Vocaloid engine on the server. This service could be used even if the user did not own the Vocaloid software. The service was available in both English and Japanese. However, as of April 2012, the service was no longer being offered on Yamaha's website.

MMDAgent
MMDAgent is a software developed by the International Voice Engineering Institute in the Nagoya Institute of Technology, and the Alpha version was released on December 25, 2010. This particular software allows users to interact with 3D models of the Vocaloid mascots. The software is made from 3D models and sound files that have already been made available on the internet and will be disputed as freeware for that reason.

Vocaloid Editor for Cubase

This particular version of Vocaloid is built solely for Cubase. It features no additional voices but will use any voice from Vocaloid 2 and Vocaloid 3 and acts as a plugin for the Cubase software. The result is that this version is compatible with most functions of Cubase 6.5 and can use its tools such as buses, filters and mixers without worrying about complications.

Vocaloid β-STUDIO
β-STUDIO is described by Yamaha as an open-beta to encourage producers to seek the future of singing voice synthesis. It is a limited service software, with service planned to end March 31, 2024. The software uses AI capability to enhance the quality and ease of use of software for users. The first voicebanks announced were ports of the UTAU voicebanks Gekiyaku and Kazehiki.

VocaloWitter

VocaloWitter
- Screenshot of the VocaloWitter software, running under iOS 8
- Developer: Yamaha Corporation
- Available in: Japanese
- Type: Voice Synthesizer Software
- License: Proprietary
- Website: www.vocaloid.com

Originally introduced as "i-Vocaloid", this is a mobile app version of the Vocaloid software with Vocaloid2 technology and was released for the iPhone. Yamaha announced a version of the Vocaloid software for the iPhone and iPad, which exhibited at the Y2 Autumn 2010 Digital Content Expo in Japan.

VocaloWitter products

- VY1, a Japanese feminine vocal. This was first announced in December 2010, VY1 was released in an adapted version of the Vocaloid software "iVOCALOID" for the iPad and iPhone as "VY1t".
- VY2, a Japanese masculine vocal, was due for release. VY2's version would have adjusted the VY1 version for compatibility and performance reasons. However, it has never been released.
- Aoki Lapis was added to this software in December 2012. This is a Japanese female vocal. This particular version of the VocaloWitter app took first place out of all paid-for apps on the iTunes store on September 11, 2013.

iVocaloid

iVocaloid
- Screenshot of the iVocaloid software with the Aoki Lapis voicebank, iPad version, running on iOS 8
- Available in: Japanese
- Type: Voice synthesizer Apps
- License: Proprietary
- Website: https://www.vocaloid.com/mveditor/

This was a more advanced version of the VocaloWitter app and was for the iPhone and iPad, it was based on the Vocaloid2 and Vocaloid3 engine. It was originally released alongside the iOS version of Vocaloid called "i-Vocaloid" (later renamed VocaloWitter) and was released using a version of the Vocaloid 2 software. It contains many of the same functions as Vocaloid 2 software although some functions are absent. It was released at a much lower price than the full Vocaloid 2 software, offering a cheap alternative to buying the PC version. However, it is only available in Japanese and requires a Japanese chip to install. In August 2014, it was upgraded, enabling users to download the update. The update allowed access to the Vocaloid Net Cloud storage service. For the first time, users could exchange VSQX files with Vocaloid 3 or the Vocaloid 3 Neo version. Using Vocaloid Net gave users free access to a standard song writing service for the first time.

iVocaloid products

- VY1: A feminine vocal released for the software. This was the first vocal sold.
- VY2: In October 2011, VY2 was made available, this is a masculine vocal.
- Aoki Lapis: Lapis was added in November 2012, she is a female vocal.
- Merli: Merli was added August 2014, she is a female vocal.

Unity with Vocaloid
Originally introduced under the name "Vocaloid for Unity", this is a version of the Vocaloid engine for the Unity game engine.

Mobile Vocaloid Editor

Mobile Vocaloid Editor
- iPad and iPhone versions of the software
- Developer: Yamaha Corporation
- Available in: Japanese, English
- Type: Vocal Synthesizer Apps
- License: Proprietary
- Website: https://www.vocaloid.com/mveditor/

Mobile Vocaloid Editor is an iPad and iPhone version of the Vocaloid 4 (until 2025) or Vocaloid 6 (since 2025) engine. It comes with VY1 "Lite" as standard and demo songs are bundled with the app. The app offers "DYN", "PIT" and "VIB" and handles 16 tracks of data. It can do 999 bars of music, but, in comparison to the full Vocaloid 4 editor, cannot do "growl" or "cross-synthesis". The input entries of the app differ from the normal Vocaloid 4 method of importing data. Most functions can be used with one or two fingers and it is possible to draw parameter lines with a single finger. Compared also to iVocaloid, it can achieve the full C2~G8 range of notes. Despite the inclusion of English vocals, it had no English interface and was sold only in Japan until October 2025.

Mobile Vocaloid Editor products

The following products are able to be purchased;

- VY1: The full version of the Japanese feminine VY1 vocal.
- ZOLA Project: Yuu, Wil and Kyo are 3 male vocals, each are sold separately.
- Aoki Lapis: Japanese female vocal.
- Merli: Japanese female vocal.
- Mew: Japanese female vocal.
- Galaco: Japanese female vocal, she comes with two versions "red" and "blue" both are sold separately.
- Cyber Diva: English female vocal.
- Yuzuki Yukari: Japanese female vocal, has 3 versions "Jun", "Onn" and "Lin" which are each sold separately.
- Sachiko: Japanese female vocal.
- Megpoid: Female vocal, has two vocals "Native" which is a Japanese vocal and "English" both are sold separately.
- Unity-Chan: Japanese female vocal.

=== Hardware ===
Vocaloid-Board
Vocaloid is set to become a hardware version called Vocaloid-Board.

eVocaloid

This is a LSI sound generator that uses the voice of VY1 (version dubbed "eVY1") and can be used for mobile devices and unlike the software version of Vocaloid, works in real-time computing. One such device confirmed to contain an eVocaloid chip is the Pocket Miku device.

Vocaloid Keyboard

This is a keytar which has Vocaloid voices loaded into it.

Anizon VOCALOOP

== Marketing ==
Though developed by Yamaha, the marketing of each Vocaloid is left to the respective studios. Yamaha themselves do maintain a degree of promotional efforts in the actual Vocaloid software, as seen when the humanoid robot model HRP-4C of the National Institute of Advanced Industrial Science and Technology (AIST) was set up to react to three Vocaloids—Hatsune Miku, Megpoid and Crypton's noncommercial Vocaloid software "CV-4Cβ"—as part of promotions for both Yamaha and AIST at CEATEC in 2009. The prototype voice CV-4Cβ was created by sampling a Japanese voice actress, Eriko Nakamura.

Japanese magazines such as DTM magazine are responsible for the promotion and introduction for many of the Japanese Vocaloids to Japanese Vocaloid fans. It has featured Vocaloids such as Hatsune Miku, Kagamine Rin and Len, and Megurine Luka, printing some sketches by artist Kei Garou and reporting the latest Vocaloid news. Thirty-day trial versions of Miriam, Lily and Iroha have also contributed to the marketing success of those particular voices. After the success of SF-A2 Miki's CD album, other Vocaloids such as VY1 and Iroha have also used promotional CDs as a marketing approach to selling their software. When Amazon MP3 in Japan opened on November 9, 2010, Vocaloid albums were featured as its free-of-charge contents.

Crypton has been involved with the marketing of their Character Vocal Series, particularly Hatsune Miku, has been actively involved in the GT300 class of the Super GT since 2008 with the support of Good Smile Racing (a branch of Good Smile Company, mainly in charge of car-related products, especially itasha (cars featuring illustrations of anime-styled characters) stickers). Although Good Smile Company was not the first to bring the anime and manga culture to Super GT, it departs from others by featuring itasha directly rather than colorings onto vehicles.

Since the 2008 season, three different teams received their sponsorship under Good Smile Racing, and turned their cars to Vocaloid-related artwork:

- Studie, which participated in the 2008 and 2009 seasons with BMW Z4 E86, and BMW Z4 GT3 in the 2011 season. Their car was painted in official Hatsune Miku art in 2008 season, but started using fan-derivative versions of Hatsune Miku in some races since the 2009 season. The team was crowned as 2011 Super GT season GT300 Champion by winning in three out of eight rounds (Sepang, Fuji 250km, as well as Motegi), which are all from pole to checkered flag.
- Team MOLA, using a Nissan Fairlady Z, and they received sponsors on the final race in Fuji in the 2008 season. Images of Kagamine Rin and Len was added on their original colorings. The Fuji round, in fact, is the first FIA race to feature two unique itasha cars competing in a single race.
- Team COX, participating in the 2010 season, which used a Porsche 996 GT3 RSR and a Porsche 997 GT3-R. Their car used Racing Miku (an official Hatsune Miku derivative, wearing an orange race queen suit) as their image.

As well as involvements with the GT series, Crypton also established the website Piapro. A number of games starting from Hatsune Miku: Project DIVA were produced by Sega under license using Hatsune Miku and other Crypton Vocaloids, as well as "fan made" Vocaloids. Later, a mobile phone game called Hatsune Miku Vocalo x Live was produced by Japanese mobile social gaming website Gree. TinierMe Gacha also made attire that looks like Miku for their services, allowing users to make their avatar resemble the Crypton Vocaloids.

Two unofficial manga were also produced for the series, Maker Unofficial: Hatsune Mix being the most well known of the two, which was released by Jive in their Comic Rush magazine; this series is drawn by Vocaloid artist Kei Garou. The series features the Crypton Vocaloids in various scenarios, a different one each week. The series focuses on the Crypton Vocaloids, although Internet Co., Ltd.'s Gackpoid Vocaloid makes a guest appearance in two chapters. The series also saw guest cameos of Vocaloid variants such as Hachune Miku, Yowane Haku, Akita Neru and the Utauloid Kasane Teto. The series comprises the original 28 chapters serialized in Comic Rush and a collection of the first 10 chapters in a single tankōbon volume. A manga was produced for Lily by Kei Garou, who also drew the mascot. An anime music video titled "Schwarzgazer", which shows the world where Lily is, was produced and it was released with the album anim.o.v.e 02, however the song is sung by Move, not by Vocaloids. A yonkoma manga based on Hatsune Miku and drawn by Kentaro Hayashi, Shūkan Hajimete no Hatsune Miku!, began serialization in Weekly Young Jump on September 2, 2010. Hatsune Miku appeared in Weekly Playboy magazine. However, Crypton Future Media confirmed they will not be producing an anime based on their Vocaloids as it would limit the creativity of their user base, preferring to let their user base to have freedom to create PV's without restrictions.

Initially, Crypton Future Media were the only studio that was allowed the license of figurines to be produced for their Vocaloids. A number of figurines and plush dolls were also released under license to Max Factory and the Good Smile Company of Crypton's Vocaloids. Among these figures were also Figma models of the entire "Character Vocal Series" mascots as well as Nendoroid figures of various Crypton Vocaloids and variants. Pullip versions of Hatsune Miku, Kagamine Len and Rin have also been produced for release in April 2011; other Vocaloid dolls have since been announced from the Pullip doll line. As part of promotions for Vocaloid Lily, license for a figurine was given to Phat Company and Lily became the first non-Crypton Vocaloid to receive a figurine.

With regard to the English Vocaloid studios, Power FX's Sweet Ann was given her own MySpace page and Sonika her own Twitter account. In comparison to Japanese studios, Zero-G and PowerFX maintain a high level of contact with their fans. Zero-G in particular encourages fan feed back and, after adopting Sonika as a mascot for their studio, has run two competitions related to her. There was also talk from PowerFX of redoing their Sweet Ann box art and a competition would be included as part of the redesign. The Vocaloid Lily also had a competition held during her trial period. English Vocaloids have not sold enough to warrant extras, such as seen with Crypton's Miku Append. However, it has been confirmed if the English Vocaloids become more popular, then Appends would be an option in the future. Crypton plans to start an electronic magazine for English readers at the end of 2010 in order to encourage the growth of the English Vocaloid fanbase. Extracts of PowerFX's Sweet Ann and Big Al were included in Soundation Studio in their Christmas loops and sound release with a competition included.

Crypton and Toyota began working together to promote the launch of the 2011 Toyota Corolla using Hatsune Miku to promote the car. The launch of the car also marked the start of Miku's debut in the US alongside it. Crypton had always sold Hatsune Miku as a virtual instrument, but they decided to ask their own fanbase in Japan if it was okay with them to market her to the United States as a virtual singer instead.

=== Promotional events ===
The largest promotional event for Vocaloids is "The Voc@loid M@ster" (Vom@s) convention held four times a year in Tokyo or the neighboring Kanagawa Prefecture. The event brings producers and illustrators involved with the production of Vocaloid art and music together so they can sell their work to others. The original event was held in 2007 with 48 groups, or "circles", given permission to host stalls at the event for the selling of their goods. The event soon gained popularity and at the 14th event, nearly 500 groups had been chosen to have stalls. Additionally, Japanese companies involved with production of the software also have stalls at the events. The very first live concert related to Vocaloid was held in 2004 with the Vocaloid Miriam in Russia.

Vocaloids have also been promoted at events such as the NAMM show and the Musikmesse fair. In fact, it was the promotion of Zero-G's Lola and Leon at the NAMM trade show that would later introduce PowerFX to the Vocaloid program. These events have also become an opportunity for announcing new Vocaloids with Prima being announced at the NAMM event in 2007 and Tonio having been announced at the NAMM event in 2009. A customized, Chinese version of Sonika was released at the Fancy Frontier Develop Animation Festival, as well as with promotional versions with stickers and posters. Sanrio held a booth at Comiket 78 featuring the voice of an unreleased Vocaloid. AH-Software in cooperation with Sanrio shared a booth and the event was used to advertise both the Hello Kitty game and AH-Software's new Vocaloid. At the Nico Nico Douga Daikaigi 2010 Summer: Egao no Chikara event, Internet Co., Ltd. announced their latest Vocaloid "Gachapoid" based on popular children's character Gachapin.

Originally, Hiroyuki Ito—President of Crypton Future Media—claimed that Hatsune Miku was not a virtual idol but a kind of the Virtual Studio Technology instrument. However, Hatsune Miku performed her first "live" concert like a virtual idol on a projection screen during Animelo Summer Live at the Saitama Super Arena on August 22, 2009. At the "MikuFes '09 (Summer)" event on August 31, 2009, her image was screened by rear projection on a mostly-transparent screen. Miku also performed her first overseas live concert on November 21, 2009, during Anime Festival Asia (AFA) in Singapore. On March 9, 2010, Miku's first solo live performance titled "Miku no Hi Kanshasai 39's Giving Day" was opened at the Zepp Tokyo in Odaiba, Tokyo. The tour was run as part of promotions for Sega's Hatsune Miku: Project Diva video game in March 2010. The success and possibility of these tours is owed to the popularity of Hatsune Miku and so far Crypton is the only studio to have established a world tour of their Vocaloids.

Later, the CEO of Crypton Future Media appeared in San Francisco at the start of the San Francisco tour where the first Hatsune Miku concert was hosted in North America on September 18, 2010, featuring songs provided by the Miku software voice. A second screening of the concert was on October 11, 2010, in the San Francisco Viz Cinema. A screening of the concert was also shown in New York City in the city's anime festival. Hiroyuki Ito, and planner/producer, Wataru Sasaki, who were responsible for Miku's creation, attended an event on October 8, 2010, at the festival. Videos of her performance are due to be released worldwide. Megpoid and Gackpoid were also featured in the 2010 King Run Anison Red and White concert. This event also used the same projector method to display Megpoid and Gackpoid on a large screen. Their appearance at the concert was done as a one-time event and both Vocaloids were featured singing a song originally sung by their respective voice provider.

The next live concert was set for Tokyo on March 9, 2011. Other events included the Vocarock Festival 2011 on January 11, 2011, and the Vocaloid Festa which was held on February 12, 2011. The Vocaloid Festa had also hosted a competition officially endorsed by Pixiv, with the winner seeing their creation unveiled at Vocafes2 on May 29, 2011. The first Vocaloid concert in North America was held in Los Angeles on July 2, 2011, at the Nokia Theater during Anime Expo; the concert was identical to the March 9, 2010, event except for a few improvements and new songs. Another concert was held in Sapporo on August 16 and 17, 2011. Hatsune Miku also had a concert in Singapore on November 11, 2011. Since then, there have been multiple concerts every year featuring Miku in various concert series, such as Magical Mirai, and Miku Expo.

== Cultural impact ==
The software became very popular in Japan upon the release of Crypton Future Media's Hatsune Miku Vocaloid 2 software and her success has led to the popularity of the Vocaloid software in general. Japanese video sharing website Niconico played a fundamental role in the recognition and popularity of the software. Otomania, a user of Hatsune Miku and an illustrator released a much-viewed video, in which "Hachune Miku", a super deformed Miku, held a Welsh onion (Negi in Japanese), which resembles a leek, and sang the Finnish song "Ievan Polkka" like the flash animation "Loituma Girl", on Nico Nico Douga. According to Crypton, they knew that users of Nico Nico Douga had started posting videos with songs created by the software before Hatsune Miku, but the video presented multifarious possibilities of applying the software in multimedia content creation—notably the dōjin culture.

As the recognition and popularity of the software grew, Nico Nico Douga became a place for collaborative content creation. Popular original songs written by a user would generate illustrations, animation in 2D and 3D, and remixes by other users. Other creators would show their unfinished work and ask for ideas. The software has also been used to tell stories using song and verse and the Story of Evil series has become so popular that a manga, six books, and two theatre works were produced by the series creator. Another theater production based on "Cantarella", a song sung by Kaito and produced by Kurousa-P, was also set to hit the stage and will run Shibuya's Space Zero theater in Tokyo from August 3 to 7, 2011. The website has become so influential that studios often post demos on Nico Nico Douga, as well as other websites such as YouTube, as part of the promotional effort of their Vocaloid products. The important role Nico Nico Douga has played in promoting the Vocaloids also sparked interest in the software and Kentaro Miura, the artist of Gakupo's mascot design, had offered his services for free because of his love for the website.

In September 2009, three figurines based on the derivative character "Hachune Miku" were launched in a rocket from the United States state of Nevada's Black Rock Desert, though it did not reach outer space. In late November 2009, a petition was launched in order to get a custom made Hatsune Miku aluminum plate (8 cm x 12 cm, 3.1" x 4.7") made that would be used as a balancing weight for the Japanese Venus space probe Akatsuki. Started by Hatsune Miku fan Sumio Morioka that goes by chodenzi-P, this project received the backing of Dr. Seiichi Sakamoto of the Japan Aerospace Exploration Agency (JAXA). The website of the petition written in Japanese was translated into other languages such as English, Russian, Chinese and Korean, and, the petition exceeded the needed 10,000 signatures necessary to have the plates made on December 22, 2009. On May 21, 2010, at 06:58:22 (JST), Akatsuki was launched on the rocket H-IIA 202 Flight 17 from the Japanese spaceport Tanegashima Space Center, having three plates depicting Hatsune Miku.

The Vocaloid software has also had a great influence on the character Black Rock Shooter, which looks like Hatsune Miku but is not linked to her by design. The character was made famous by the song "Black Rock Shooter", and a number of figurines have been made. An original video animation made by Ordet was streamed for free as part of a promotional campaign running from June 25 to August 31, 2010. The virtual idols "Meaw" have also been released aimed at the Vocaloid culture. The twin Thai virtual idols released two singles, "Meaw Left ver." and "Meaw Right ver.", sung in Japanese.

A cafe for one day only was opened in Tokyo based on Hatsune Miku on August 31, 2010. A second event was arranged for all Japanese Vocaloids. "Snow Miku" was also featured on an event as a part of the 62nd Sapporo Snow Festival in February 2011. A Vocaloid-themed TV show on the Japanese Vocaloids called Vocalo Revolution began airing on Kyoto Broadcasting System on January 3, 2011. The show is part of a bid to make the Vocaloid culture more widely accepted and features a mascot known as "Cul", also mascot of the "Cul Project". The show's first success story is a joint collaboration between Vocalo Revolution and the school fashion line "Cecil McBee" Music x Fashion x Dance. Piapro also held a competition with famous fashion brands with the winners seeing their Lolita-based designs reproduced for sale by the company Putumayo. A radio station set up a 1-hour program containing nothing but Vocaloid-based music.

The Vocaloid software had a great influence on the development of the freeware UTAU. Several products were produced for the Macne series (Mac音シリーズ) for intended use for the programs Reason 4 and GarageBand. These products were sold by Act2 and by converting their file format, were able to also work with the UTAU program. The program Maidloid, developed for the character Acme Iku (阿久女イク), was also developed, which works in a similar way to Vocaloid, except produces erotic sounds rather than an actual singing voice. Other than Vocaloid, AH-Software also developed Tsukuyomi Ai and Shouta for the software Voiceroid, and the sale of their Vocaloids gave AH-Software the chance to promote Voiceroid at the same time. The software is aimed for speaking rather than singing. Both AH-Software's Vocaloids and Voiceroids went on sale on December 4, 2009. Crypton Future Media has been reported to openly welcome these additional software developments as it expands the market for synthesized voices.

During the events of the 2011 Tōhoku earthquake and tsunami, a number of Vocaloid related donation drives were produced. Crypton Future Media joined several other companies in a donation drive, with money spent on the sales of music from Crypton Future Media's Karent label being donated to the Japanese Red Cross. In addition, a special Nendoroid of Hatsune Miku, Nendoroid Hatsune Miku: Support ver., was announced with a donation of 1,000 yen per sale to the Japanese Red Cross. In addition to the donation drives held by Crypton Future Media, AH-Software created the Voiceroid voicebank Tohoku Zunko to promote the recovery of the Tōhoku region and its culture.

In 2012, Vocaloid was quoted as one of the contributors to a 10% increase in cosplay related services. In 2013, the Vocaloid 3 software Oliver was used as the voice of Cartoon Hangover character PuppyCat from their web series Bee and PuppyCat.

In 2017 a musical adaptation of the story of the Vocaloid song "The Daughter of Evil" (Part of Mothy's "Evillious Chronicles" collection) was announced. The musical was performed at the Owl Spot in Tokyo from June 4–11. The musical latest re-run was March 13–17, 2024 at Kokumin Kyosai Coop Hall/Space Zero in Tokyo.

In 2023, a Pokémon collaboration was announced and released. Named Project Voltage, it consists of art of Hatsune Miku as different Pokémon type trainers. The art was drawn by six different artists, some of which are prominent artists for the Pokémon Trading Card Game. After the release of all 18 Pokémon type artworks, songs by 18 different producers were released.

=== Music ===
Vocaloid Miriam Stockley

Thingymajigtus

Vocaloid music was originally considered as an internet underground culture, but with a decade of social change, it has become a popular musical genre. Musicians who create songs using the Vocaloid software are called Vocaloid producers.

The earliest use of Vocaloid-related software used prototypes of Kaito and Meiko and were featured on the album History of Logic System by Hideki Matsutake released on July 24, 2003, and sang the song "Ano Subarashii Ai o Mō Ichido". The first album to be released using a full commercial Vocaloid was A Place in the Sun, which used Leon's voice for the vocals singing in both Russian and English. Miriam has also been featured in two albums, Light + Shade and Continua. Japanese progressive-electronic artist Susumu Hirasawa used the Lola Vocaloid in the original soundtrack of Paprika by Satoshi Kon. The software's biggest asset is its ability to see continued usage even long after its initial release date. Even early on in the software's history, the music making progress proved to be a valuable asset to the Vocaloid development as it not only opened up the possibilities of how the software may be applied in practice, but led to the creation of further Vocaloids to fill in the missing roles the software had yet to cover. The album A Place in the Sun was noted to have songs that were designed for a male voice with a rougher timbre than the Vocaloid Leon could provide; this later led to the development of Big Al to fulfill this particular role.

Some of the most popular albums are on the Exit Tunes label, featuring the works of Vocaloid producers in Japan. One of the Vocaloid compilations, Exit Tunes Presents Vocalogenesis feat. Hatsune Miku, debuted at No. 1 on the Japanese weekly Oricon albums chart in May 2010, becoming the first Vocaloid album ever to top the charts. The album sold 23,000 copies in its first week and eventually sold 86,000 copies. The following released album, Exit Tunes Presents Vocalonexus feat. Hatsune Miku, became the second Vocaloid album to top the weekly charts in January 2011. Another album, Supercell, by the group Supercell also features a number of songs using Vocaloids. Upon its release in North America, it became ranked as the second highest album on Amazon's bestselling MP3 album in the international category in the United States and topped the store's bestselling chart for world music on iTunes.

Other albums, such as 19's Sound Factory's First Sound Story and Livetune's Re:Repackage, and Re:Mikus also feature Miku's voice. Other uses of Miku include the albums Sakura no Ame (桜ノ雨) by Absorb and Miku no Kanzume (みくのかんづめ) by OSTER-project. Kagamine Len and Rin's songs were covered by Asami Shimoda in the album Prism credited to "Kagamine Rin/Len feat. Asami Shimoda". The compilation album Vocarock Collection 2 feat. Hatsune Miku was released by Farm Records on December 15, 2010, and was later featured on the Cool Japan Music iPhone app in February 2011. The record label Balloom became the first label to focus solely on Vocaloid-related works and their first release was Unhappy Refrain by the Vocaloid producer Wowaka. Hatsune Miku's North American debut song "World is Mine" ranked at No. 7 in the iTunes world singles ranking in the week of its release. Singer Gackt also challenged Gackpoid users to create a song, with the prize being 10 million yen, stating if the song was to his liking he would sing and include it in his next album. The winning song "Episode 0" and runner up song "Paranoid Doll" were later released by Gackt on July 13, 2011. In relation to the Good Smiling racing promotions that Crypton Future Media Vocaloids had played part in, the album Hatsune Miku GT Project Theme Song Collection was released in August 2011 as part of a collaboration.

In the month prior to her release, SF-A2 Miki was featured in the album Vocaloids X'mas: Shiroi Yoru wa Seijaku o Mamotteru as part of her promotion. The album featured the Vocaloid singing Christmas songs. Miki was also featured singing the introduction of the game Hello Kitty to Issho! Block Crash 123!!. A young female prototype used for the "project if..." series was used in Sound Horizon's musical work "Ido e Itaru Mori e Itaru Ido", labeled as the "prologue maxi". The prototype sang alongside Miku for their music and is known only by the name "Junger März_Prototype β". For Yamaha's VY1 Vocaloid, an album featuring VY1 was created. The album was released with the deluxe version of the program. It includes various well-known producers from Nico Nico Douga and YouTube and includes covers of various popular and well-known Vocaloid songs using the VY1 product. The first press edition of Nekomura Iroha was released with a CD containing her two sample songs "Tsubasa" and "Abbey Fly", and the install disc also contained VSQ files of the two songs for use with her program. A number of Vocaloid related music, including songs starring Hatsune Miku, were featured in the arcade game Music Gun Gun! 2. One of the rare singles with the English speaking Sonika, "Suburban Taxi", was released by Alexander Stein and the German label Volume0dB on March 11, 2010.

To celebrate the release of the Vocaloid 3 software, a compilation album titled The Vocaloids was released. The CD contains 18 songs sung by Vocaloids released in Japan and contains a booklet with information about the Vocaloid characters. Porter Robinson used the Vocaloid Avanna for his studio album Worlds.

Yamaha utilized Vocaloid technology to mimic the voice of deceased rock musician Hide, who died in 1998, to complete and release his song "Co Gal" in 2014. The musician's actual voice, breathing sounds and other cues were extracted from previously released songs and a demo and combined with the synthesized voice. Kenji Arakawa, a spokesman for Yamaha, said he believes this to be the first time a work by a deceased artist is commercially available and includes the dead person singing lyrics completed after their death.

== Legal implications ==
For illustrations of the characters, Crypton Future Media licensed "original illustrations of Hatsune Miku, Kagamine Rin, Kagamine Len, Megurine Luka, Meiko and Kaito" under Creative Commons-Attribution-NonCommercial 3.0 Unported ("CC BY-NC"), allowing for artists to use the characters in noncommercial adaptations and derivations with attribution.

According to Crypton, because professional female singers refused to provide voice samples, in fear that the software might create clones of their singing voices, Crypton changed their focus from imitating certain singers to creating characteristic vocals. This change of focus led to sampling vocals of voice actors and the Japanese voice actor agency Arts Vision supported the development. Similar concerns are expressed throughout the other studios using Vocaloid, with Zero-G refusing to release the names of several of their providers. PowerFX only hinted at Sweet Ann's voice provider, and Oliver's voice provider is still unknown. AH-Software named the voice providers for Miki, Kiyoteru, Yukari, Zunko and Iroha, but for legal reasons cannot name Kaai Yuki's voice provider as a minor was the subject of the recordings.

Any rights or obligations arising from the vocals created by the software belong to the software user. Just like any music synthesizer, the software is treated as a musical instrument and the vocals as sound. Under the term of license, the mascots for the software can be used to create vocals for commercial or non-commercial use as long as the vocals do not offend public policy. In other words, the user is bound under the term of license of the software not to synthesize derogatory or disturbing lyrics. On the other hand, copyrights to the mascot image and name belong to their respective studios. Under the term of license, a user cannot commercially distribute a vocal as a song sung by the character, nor use the mascot image on commercial products, without the consent of the studio who owns them.

Employees working within the studios are bound by legal implications not to repeat any details given to them from Yamaha on Vocaloid development without Yamaha's permission. They are also not allowed to disclose details of upcoming Vocaloids without permission of the Vocaloid studio nor reveal the identity of the singer if the studio does not make it public.

On November 29, 2010, Crypton started an independent music publication for seeking copyright royalties if songs are used for commercial purposes such as karaoke, because Vocaloid users hardly used the copyright collective Japanese Society for Rights of Authors, Composers and Publishers (JASRAC). Due to the fact songs using the software are made by independent users, the act of plagiarism has remained a highly controversial issue among Vocaloid users and their published works. This has been a heated issue on both illustrative and musical levels with songs and their publishers being targeted by allegations of stealing the works of others. In January 2011, Japanese boyband KAT-TUN were forced to admit plagiarism against their song "Never×Over~「-」Is Your Part~", after the producer of the song admitted it was influenced by the Vocaloid song "DYE" produced by AVTechNO!, fans having expressed their outrage over the similarities of the two songs. However, AVTechNO! also released a statement explaining that the members of the band were not to blame for this incident.

=== Political use ===
One of the most controversial uses of the legal agreements of any Vocaloid producing studio was from the Democratic Party of Japan, whose running candidate, Kenzo Fujisue, attempted to secure the use of Miku's image in the Japanese House of Councillors election of July 11, 2010. The hope was that the party could use her image to appeal to younger voters. Although Crypton Future Media rejected the party's use of her image or name for political purposes, Fujisue released the song "We Are the One" using her voice but not credited to her on YouTube, by replacing her image with the party's character in the music video.

== Reception ==
Despite the success of the software in Japan, overseas customers have been largely reluctant to embrace it. When interviewed by the Vocaloid producing company Zero-G, music producer Robert Hedin described how the software offered creative freedom. He compared it to auto-tuning software, stating the Vocaloid software itself has enough imperfections to present itself as a singer who does not sound human. However, he states that Vocaloid also does not "snap into tune" like auto-tuning software, which the music industry seems to favor these days. Giuseppe, who had produced demo songs for both Zero-G and PowerFX Vocaloids, and is aided in the production of Spanish-based Vocaloids, had noted that each Vocaloid package worked the same way. However, each vocal has its own unique personality to it, so choosing one vocal over another is not easy. He hoped that the Vocaloid software will continue to progress forward so long as its userbase continues to push it forward. He also noted that the software's slow start and its early bad reputation was the hardest part for the software to overcome regarding its success, and like any commercial product, a decrease in sales would result in a decrease in development. However, focus had switched from focusing on the vocals to focusing on the boxart character mascot itself at this point.

The CEO of Crypton Future Media noted the lack of interest in Vocaloids overall was put down to the lack of response in the initial Vocaloid software. With regard to the development of the English version of the software specifically, many studios when approached by Crypton Future Media for recommendations towards developing the English Vocaloids had no interest in the software initially, with one particular company representative calling it a "toy". A level of failure was put on Leon and Lola for lack of sales in the United States, putting the blame on their British accents. Crypton praised the value of the English Vocaloids and what they offered to the Japanese users for their capability of offering the English language to them, when it would otherwise be off limits. As Hatsune Miku was responsible for making the software famous, her voice has become the most commonly associated with the Vocaloid software and divides opinions of critics both overseas and within Japan on their opinions towards her and the software. Crypton blamed a fear of robots on part of the lack of response on the sale of the software overseas and expressed that there was also a general "anti-Vocaloid" point of view amongst some cultures and communities, although he also noted that he hoped in the future this would change as the software continued to be developed. Prior to the release of the Hatsune Miku product, Crypton Future Media had also noted there was some criticism at choosing to release the original Vocaloid engine as a commercial licensing product, although felt that the choice was for the better of the engine. Furthermore, it was noted that the original Vocaloid engine felt more like a prototype for future engine versions.

Even with the lack of success for the English version of the software in the United States, Crypton Future Media reported that about half of music downloads at the iTunes Store for songs of Crypton's label Karent, published by Japanese producers, have been from overseas purchases, with sales from American consumers making up the majority of percentages of overseas sales. Despite experiencing good sales in Europe, it was reported the software is failing to attract a satisfactory level of attention, and software developers are now setting their sights on trying to overturn the lack of interest in the software in Europe.

Hatsune Miku picked up second place in a 2010 Japanese Yahoo! poll on Japanese gamers' favorite characters, owed to her starring role in Hatsune Miku: Project DIVA 2nd. CNN's website CNNGo declared Hatsune Miku as one of Japan's best in their "Tokyo best and worst of 2010", listing her as the "Best new virtual singer for the otaku generation". Clash magazine labeled Hatsune Miku and the Vocaloid software as the future of music. Based on a December 16, 2023, survey conducted by Nikkei Entertainment, the fanbase of Vocaloid within Japan has an average age of 21 years, and a male-to-female ratio of approximately 50:50.

Vocaloid was sold as a product for professional musicians, and although there were many producers using the software within Japan by 2011, a report was released detailing the true reflections of the Vocaloid craze. It was conducted independently by fans of the Vocaloid software and detailed the popularity of certain Vocaloids over others. Most Vocaloid related videos struggled to get over 5,000 views, with the most popular producers gaining the most interest over less popular producers. In order of the most video uploads were Hatsune Miku (first), Kagamine Rin (second), Gumi (third), Megurine Luka (fourth), Kagamine Len (fifth) and Kaito (sixth) had the most videos uploaded related to them, while all other Vocaloids had less than 1,000 uploads related to them. This was not true for all the calculations they ran to determine the popularity, including average and mean views and mylists. In the end, only Gumi and the Kagamine software packages managed to stay on the top six lists of all their calculations, with popular Vocaloid Hatsune Miku failing to make it on the mean average top six list calculations for the study period. In 2013, it was estimated that about 30% of all videos updated each month on Niconico were Vocaloid related.

Despite its growing popularity as a franchise, by December 2015, Vocaloid was still struggling to make an impact in the west; Hatsune Miku also did not make as much of an impact. Concerns were mostly focused on Vocaloid itself at this point. It was also reported that more Japanese companies were growing protective of their properties, with Hatsune Miku: Project DIVA X, which was released at the time, being the center of one such conflict of copyright interest. The market for such games was described as a "niche audience in the west".

== See also ==
- Auto-Tune
- Cantor
- CeVIO
- Computer music
- Dōjin music
- Hatsune Miku
- List of Vocaloid products
- Macne series
- Kagerou Project
- Nyan Cat
- Reol
- Software synthesizer
- Speech synthesis
- UTAU
- Virtual idol
- Voiceroid

== Bibliography ==
Technologies

- Bonada, Jordi; et al. (2001). "Singing voice synthesis combining Excitation plus Resonance and Sinusoidal plus Residual Models" (PDF). Proc. Of ICMC.
- Bonada, Jordi; Loscos, Alex (2003). "Sample-based singing voice synthesizer by spectral concatenation". Proc. of the Stockholm Music Acoustics Conference (SMAC) 03: 439–442.
- Kenmochi, Hideki; Ohshima, Hayato. "VOCALOID - Commercial singing synthesizer based on sample concatenation" (PDF). Interspeech 2007. Archived from the original (PDF) on 2012-03-15.
- "Interview of Hideki Kenmochi". DTM magazine (January 2008 Special ed. The Vocaloid CV01 Hatsune Miku) (in Japanese). Vol. 15, no. 2. Terajima Joho Kikaku. January 2008. pp. 36–39. ASIN B000YKXQTI.
- Kenmochi, Hideki; Ohshima, Hayato (February 8, 2008). "Singing synthesis system "Vocaloid" Current situation and todo lists". IPSJ SIG Notes (in Japanese). 2008 (12). SIG Music and Computer (SIGMUS), Information Processing Society of Japan (IPSJ): 51–56. ISSN 0919-6072. 2008-MUS-74-(9). Archived from the original (PDF) on 2025-11-12.
- Kenmochi, Hideki (March 2008). "第III章 歌唱合成システムVOCALOIDと初音ミク [Part 3. Singing Synthesis System VOCALOID and Hatsune MIKU]" (PDF). デジタルコンテンツの知的財産権に関する調査研究: 進化するコンテンツビジネスモデルとその収益性・合法性—VOCALOID2、初音ミク、ユーザ、UGMサイト、権利者—報告書 [The Research and Study about the Intellectual Property Rights of the Digital Contents: Developing Content Business Models and these Profitabilities and Legalities—Vocaloid 2, Hatsune Miku, Users, UGM Sites and Rightful Claimants—The Report] (in Japanese). Digital Content Association of Japan (DCAJ). pp. 33–50.
- Kenmochi, Hideki (May 25, 2008). "Singing Synthesis: VOCALOID and its Technologies". Journal of the Human Interface Society (in Japanese). 10 (2): 161–164. ISSN 1344-7254.
- Kenmochi, Hideki; Fujimoto, Ken (2014). ボーカロイド技術論: 歌声合成の基礎とその仕組み [Vocaloid Technological Theory - Foundation and mechanism of singing voice synthesis]. Tokyo: Yamaha Music Media. ISBN 978-4-636-89996-2.
- Michel, Patrick St. (November 11, 2014). "The Making of Vocaloid". Red Bull Music Academy.

Derivative products

- Ameya/Ayame (2008). "歌声合成ツールUTAU" [Vocal Synthesis Tool UTAU] (in Japanese). Vocal Synthesis Tool UTAU.
- Higuchi, Masaru (Yu) (February 24, 2008). "MikuMikuDance". Vocaloid Promotion Video Project (powered by GeoCities).
- Nakano, Tomoyasu; Goto, Masataka (July 6, 2009). "VocaListener: A Singing-to-Singing Synthesis System Based on Iterative Parameter Estimation".
  - Nakano, Tomoyasu; Goto, Masataka (2008). VocaListener(ぼかりす): ユーザ歌唱の歌い方を真似る歌声合成パラメータを自動推定するシステム [VocaListener (Bokarisu): A system for automatic parameter estimation of the singing voice synthesis, for imitating the user's singing style] (in Japanese).
