= Hiiragi Magnetite =

Japanese musician and Vocaloid producer

Hiiragi Magnetite 柊マグネタイト
- Also known as: MagnetiteP; SatsumaP
- Born: 2001 or 2002 (age 24–25)
- Origin: Japan
- Genres: J-pop; EDM; dubstep; progressive house
- Occupations: DJ, songwriter, record producer
- Instruments: Vocaloid; keyboard
- Years active: 2020–present

Hiiragi Magnetite (Japanese: 柊マグネタイト) is a Japanese musician, Vocaloid producer, songwriter and DJ. His artist name allegedly came about because he wanted it to be more corporate.

== Early life and career ==
Hiiragi Magnetite was first introduced to Vocaloid music in 2007, and some years later began composing music in earnest using the Nintendo DS software Korg M01. He later joined a band at school, but did not perform much. At that time, he bought Hatsune Miku and started making Vocaloid music.

In September 2020, he released his debut single "Worlds End". The song is over 11 minutes long, and its length first gained him increased attention. In December, "Blade" was released and won for the rookie category at The Vocaloid Collection hosted by Dwango. These contributed to his great attention as a newcomer.

In August 2021, he released the music video for "Marshall Maximizer" (マルシャル マキシマイザー). The song went viral, even though it was never released as a single, and by September 2022 it had over 10 million views on YouTube. On Nico Nico Douga, the song reached 1 million views in November 2021, becoming the sixth song using CeVIO Creative Studio to reach this milestone on the platform. It ranked as the ninth best-performing song of the year on Niconico Vocaloid Songs Top 20 singles year-end chart of 2023.

In August 2023, he published the original song "Realize" (リアライズ), for the popular mobile gacha game Hatsune Miku: Colorful Stage!. This song became his first song to reach #1 on the Niconico Vocaloid Songs Top 20 singles chart.

In November 2024, he released the song "Tetoris" (テトリス), which is based on the puzzle video game franchise Tetris, and its theme song "Korobeiniki". Its name is a pun on the name "Tetris" and the Synthesizer V voicebank used, Kasane Teto. The song spread rapidly on social media immediately after its release, debuting at number one on both the JAPAN Heatseekers Songs and Niconico Vocaloid Songs Top 20 charts. It also debuted at number 71 on the Billboard Japan Hot 100 chart for the week of December 23, 2024, his first chart debut. It finally reached number 35. The music video reached 100 million views on YouTube in 2026.

In February 2025, he released the song "Zaako" (ざぁこ), featuring Kaai Yuki, with an accompanying music video directed by Channel, a Korean animator known for Mesmerizer. The video contains a scene in which Yuki calls out phrases that could be interpreted as suggestive, which received controversy from some Japanese and Western viewers as child abuse against public order and morals, as Yuki's vocal samples were provided by an actual elementary school student. Eventually the video was removed and the authors publicly apologized, and it was announced on Twitter that the song would be re-released after being corrected. In March, the pair released a new version of the song, as "Zako" (雑魚), with Akita Neru, a derivative character of Hatsune Miku, acting as a replacement for Yuki.

== Artistry ==
He has cited Susumu Hirasawa, Yasutaka Nakata, Skrillex, Wowaka, PinocchioP, and NayutalieN as major musical influences. His EDM style is influenced by Martin Garrix, Brooks and others.

== Accolades ==
Award nominations for Hiiragi Magnetite's works
Year	Award	Category	Nominee(s)	Result	Ref.
2025	Music Awards Japan	Best Vocaloid Culture Song	"Tetoris"	Nominated	

== Discography ==
=== Studio albums ===
List of studio album
Title	Details
Kyusekai Legacy	Released: June 25, 2025; Label: Tripod Records; Formats: CD, digital download, streaming

=== Singles ===
Title	Year	Peak chart positions		Album
Title	Year	JPN Hot	JPN Niconico Vocaloid	Album
"Worlds End"	2020	—	—	Kyusekai Legacy
"Testament"	2020	—	—	Kyusekai Legacy
"Blade"	2020	—	—	Kyusekai Legacy
"Apocalypse"	2021	—	—	Kyusekai Legacy
"Unplanned Apoptosis"	2021	—	—	Kyusekai Legacy
"Fabric Flower"	2022	—	—	Non-album single
"Pet Me"	2022	—	—	Non-album single
"Viper" (with Kankan)	2022	—	—	02
"Rasshaina"	2022	—	—	Non-album single
"Yuni"	2022	—	—	Non-album single
"Retry"	2023	—	—	Non-album single
"Perfection"	2023	—	—	Non-album single
"Yamete Kudasai"	2023	—	3	Non-album single
"Kannagi"	2023	—	9	Kyusekai Legacy
"Realize"	2023	—	1	To be released
"Kafu-eine"	2024	—	5	To be released
"Red Rose"	2024	—	6	To be released
"Tetoris"	2024	35	1	To be released
"Colorful"	2025	—	7	To be released
"Zako"	2025	—	1	To be released
"Disclose Flick"	2026	—	—	To be released

=== Remixes ===
==== 2021 ====
- Kanaria – "King" (Hiiragi Magnetite remix)
- Kaf – "Hissei yo" (Hiiragi Magnetite remix)
- Mikito-P – "ROKI" (Hiiragi Magnetite remix)

==== 2023 ====
- Kairiki Bear – "Darling Dance" (Hiiragi Magnetite remix)
- "Marshall Maximizer" (self remix)
