= Vocaloid 6 =

2022 singing voice synthesizer

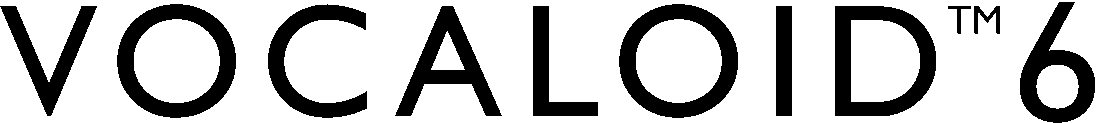

- Vocaloid 6 on Windows 10
- Original author: Yamaha Corporation
- Developer: Yamaha Corporation
- Release: October 13, 2022
- Stable release: 6.13.4 / November 11, 2026
- Operating system: Microsoft Windows macOS
- Predecessor: Vocaloid 5
- Successor: Vocaloid 7
- Available in: Japanese, English, Spanish, Korean, Chinese
- Type: Voice Synthesizer Software
- License: Proprietary
- Website: www.vocaloid.com/en/

Vocaloid 6 (Note: Japanese: VOCALOID6. While Yamaha uses the Latin alphabet to write the official name in Japanese, it also unofficially uses ボーカロイド (Bōkaroido) in katakana within its documentation and press releases.) is a singing vocal synthesizer application developed by Yamaha Corporation. It is the successor to Vocaloid 5 in the Vocaloid series, and is the first to incorporate machine learning voice synthesis, branded as Vocaloid:AI.

It was succeeded by the release of Vocaloid 7 on November 11, 2026.

== History ==
After scheduled maintenance of the official Vocaloid website on October 13, 2022, Yamaha released Vocaloid 6 without prior announcement. It introduces the Vocaloid:AI engine, which had been in development since around Vocaloid 3 and was first publicly shown in a concert, reviving the voice of deceased singer Hibari Misora. Voices developed for it offer improved synthesis quality, multilingual singing and drastically smaller file sizes. Support for older voices from Vocaloid 3 and up remains. It also features the addition of Vocalo Changer, a tool that converts the voice from a singing recording into that of a Vocaloid voice. Other additions are support for ARA 2 and an updated UI. A trial was released on the same day.

== Products ==
=== Haruka, Akito, Sarah, and Allen ===
A pair of English voicebanks and a pair of Japanese voicebanks, one each masculine and feminine. They come bundled with the Vocaloid 6 software and act as the program's default voices.

=== AI Megpoid ===
An update for Megpoid, a Japanese feminine voicebank developed by Internet Co., Ltd. based on the voice of Megumi Nakajima. It was released on October 13, 2022. Megpoid voicebanks have previously been released for Vocaloid 2, Vocaloid 3, Vocaloid 4, and Synthesizer V. An append named AI Megpoid Solid was released separately on July 4, 2024.

=== Po-uta ===
A masculine English-focused voicebank based on the voice of singer Porter Robinson, developed as a collaboration between Sample Sized, LLC and Yamaha Corporation. It was released on March 7, 2023.

=== Fuiro ===
A Japanese feminine voicebank based on singer philo, also known as Taki Takota, made as a collaboration between Yamaha Corporation and nana Music Co., Ltd., that released on May 9, 2023.

=== ZOLA Project ===
ZOLA Project is a bundle of three Japanese masculine voicebanks, Yuu, Kyo and Wil, developed by Yamaha Corporation. Originally released for Vocaloid 3 in 2013, for Vocaloid's 10th anniversary, their Vocaloid 6 versions were released on June 20, 2023, the exact 10th anniversary of their Vocaloid 3 release.

=== AI Otomachi Una ===
An update for Otomachi Una, a feminine Japanese voicebank based on the voice of Aimi Tanaka and developed by Internet Co., Ltd., that released on June 22, 2023. Previously released voicebanks for Vocaloid 4, Voiceroid 2, and Synthesizer V, among others.

=== Sakura, Asahi, Shion, and Taku ===
A collection of further Japanese default voicebanks, two masculine and two feminine, that have been included with Vocaloid 6 since update 6.3.0, released on December 24, 2023.

=== Michelle and Lucas ===
Two English default voicebanks, one masculine and one feminine, added in update 6.3.1a, released on February 19, 2024.

=== AI Hibiki Koto ===
Hibiki Koto is a Japanese feminine voicebank developed by Internet Co., Ltd. and released on April 18, 2024. Followed the same year by a Synthesizer V voicebank.

=== Shiki Rowen AI ===
A Japanese masculine voicebank developed by Mugen Co., Ltd. and released on April 24, 2024. Previously had several voicebanks for Utau and other software, many under the name Kemonone Row.

=== GekiyakuV and KazehikiV ===
Two Japanese voicebanks, masculine and feminine, developed by Kuzutokaze and Yamaha Corporation, released on July 18, 2024. Both originally released for Utau, and were included in the experimental Vocaloid plugin VX-β.

=== Galaco Black and Galaco White ===
A pair of two feminine Japanese voicebanks for the character Galaco, originally released for Vocaloid 3 and voiced by Ko Shibasaki, released August 5, 2024.

=== AI Tsuina-chan ===
A feminine Japanese voicebank released September 30, 2024. A Vocaloid voicebank for a character originally released for Voiceroid 2 and subsequently Synthesizer V.

=== Yuina and Naoki ===
Two default voicebanks, a feminine Japanese voicebank and a masculine Japanese voicebank, released October 9, 2024.

=== Vocalo no Ci-chan ===
A feminine Japanese voicebank released October 9, 2024, previously included in VX-β. Voiced by virtual YouTuber Ci the Jiangshi.

=== Kanade ===
A feminine Japanese voicebank released November 27, 2024, previously included in VX-β. Voiced by virtual YouTuber Kanade Kanon.

=== Jessica, Matthew, Brian, and Sandra ===
English default voicebanks, two feminine and two masculine, released December 18, 2024.

=== Uge ===
A feminine Japanese voicebank released January 15, 2025, previously included in VX-β. Voiced by virtual YouTuber And Uge, pronounced Ando Yuge.

=== Kasukabe Tsumugi ===
A feminine Japanese voicebank released March 3, 2025, previously included in VX-β. Voiced by virtual YouTuber Kasukabe Tsukushi, also the illustrator. Also released for Voicevox in 2021.

=== AI Yuzuki Yukari ===
An update of Yuzuki Yukari, a feminine Japanese voicebank, previously released for Voiceroid, Vocaloid 3, Vocaloid 4, Voiceroid 2, CeVIO, and VoiSona. Voiced by Chihiro Ishiguro. Released March 13, 2025.

=== Kotonoha Akane and Aoi ===
A Vocaloid version of Kotonoha Akane/Aoi, previously released for Voiceroid, Voiceroid 2, Synthesizer V, and A.I. Voice. They are feminine Japanese voicebanks, voiced by Yui Sakakibara. Their characters are twins, and Akane speaks in the Kansai dialect while Aoi speaks Standard Japanese. Released April 25, 2025.

=== Kana and Hayato ===
Default Japanese voicebanks, one feminine and one masculine, released on June 11, 2025.

=== AI Kizuna Akari ===
A Vocaloid 6 voicebank for Kizuna Akari, previously released for Vocaloid 4 and Voiceroid 2. A feminine Japanese voicebank voiced by Madoka Yonezawa. Released June 13, 2025.

=== AI Nurse Robot Type T ===
A feminine voicebank native in Japanese and Mandarin Chinese, developed by Yamaha in collaboration with Chinese creator Matsuokayu, who originally voiced, illustrated, and released an Utau voicebank for Nurse Robot Type T in 2018, followed by releases for CoeFont, Coeiroink, and Voicevox, and (after Vocaloid 6) VoiSona Talk. Released July 16, 2025.

=== Otobe Sapphire ===
A feminine Japanese voicebank voiced by Yunchi, released November 4, 2025.

=== Aya and Kazuya ===
Further default Japanese voicebanks, one female and one male, released alongside update 6.9 on November 19, 2025.

=== Asa ===
The starter voicebank for Mobile Vocaloid Editor version 2.0, released for Vocaloid 6 for free with update 6.10, released on December 3, 2025.

=== IA :[R] -ARIA ON THE PLANETES- ===
A Vocaloid 6 voicebank for the feminine Japanese voicebank IA, voiced by Lia, released January 27, 2026.

=== Hatsune Miku V6 AI ===
A Vocaloid 6 update for the feminine Japanese voicebank Hatsune Miku, voiced by Saki Fujita. Released April 14, 2026.

=== Mirai Komachi V6 ===
A Vocaloid 6 update for the feminine Japanese voicebank Mirai Komachi, originally released for Vocaloid 4. Released May 26, 2026.

=== Adachi Rei ===
After successfully building a life-size Hatsune Miku robot, Japanese creator Missile began work on an original character robot, named Adachi Rei, for which he synthesized a feminine Utau voicebank from scratch in Audacity. Officially released for Japanese, voicebanks for other languages, including English, Spanish, and French, have been created by the community. After a successful crowdfund, a pair of Vocaloid voicebanks, a Vocaloid 5 voicebank using concatenative synthesis and a Vocaloid 6 voicebank incorporating machine learning, were announced. Both released October 9, 2026
