= AH-Software =

Japanese brand

AHS Co., Ltd. 株式会社 AHS
- Type: Public KK (unlisted)
- Industry: Software, hardware, digital content, IT solutions
- Founded: August 22, 2005
- Headquarters: Waseda Bldg. 6F, 7-7-7 Ueno, Taito-ku, Tokyo 110-0005 Japan
- Area served: Japan
- Key people: Kanru Hua, President & CTO (since June 30, 2022); Tomohide Ogata, Executive Chairman (since June 30, 2022); President & CEO (until June 30, 2022)
- Products: List
- Services: Online shopping
- Number of employees: 13 (as of March 2010)
- Website: Official website

AH-Software is the software brand of AHS Co., Ltd. (original full name: Artist House Solutions Co., Ltd.), an importer of digital audio workstations and encoders in Tokyo, Japan. It is also known as the developer of Voiceroid and a number of Vocaloid voicebanks.

== Products and services ==
=== Vocaloid Products ===
AHS released their first Vocaloids on December 4, 2009, named SF-A2 Miki, Kaai Yuki, and Hiyama Kiyoteru. Kaai Yuki became the first Vocaloid to use a child's voice. AHS also published a Hello Kitty-based Vocaloid, Nekomura Iroha, based on the Kittyler featured in the game Hello Kitty to Issho! Block Crash 123!! in cooperation with Sanrio. AHS also headed the first project led by producers working with the software.

==== Vocaloid 2 Products ====
Product	Language	Sex	Voice sampled	Release date
SF-A2 Miki	Japanese	Female	Miki Furukawa	December 4, 2009
Kaai Yuki	Japanese	Female	Unknown	December 4, 2009
Hiyama Kiyoteru	Japanese	Male	Kiyoshi Hiyama	December 4, 2009
Nekomura Iroha	Japanese	Female	Kyounosuke Yoshitate	October 22, 2010

==== Vocaloid 3 Products ====
Product	Language	Sex	Voice sampled	Release date
Yuzuki Yukari	Japanese	Female	Chihiro Ishiguro	December 22, 2011
Tohoku Zunko	Japanese	Female	Satomi Satō	June 5, 2014

==== Vocaloid 4 Products ====
Product	Language	Sex	Voice sampled	Release date
Yuzuki Yukari V4	Japanese	Female	Chihiro Ishiguro	March 18, 2015
Nekomura Iroha V4	Japanese	Female	Kyounosuke Yoshitate	June 18, 2015
SF-A2 miki V4	Japanese	Female	Miki Furukawa	June 18, 2015
Kaai Yuki V4	Japanese	Female	Unknown	October 29, 2015
Hiyama Kiyoteru V4	Japanese	Male	Kiyoshi Hiyama	October 29, 2015
Tohoku Zunko V4	Japanese	Female	Satomi Satō	October 27, 2016
Kizuna Akari	Japanese	Female	Madoka Yonezawa	April 26, 2018

==== Vocaloid 5 Products ====
Product	Language	Sex	Voice sampled	Release date
Haruno Sora	Japanese	Female	Kikuko Inoue	July 26, 2018

=== Speech Synthesis ===
- Voiceroid
  - Tsukuyomi Shouta; based on a seven-year-old male.
  - Tsukuyomi Ai; based on a five-year-old female.
  - Yoshida-Kun; based on the character from Eagle Talon.
  - Tsurumaki Maki; a teenage female musician voiced by Tomoe Tamiyasu.
  - Yuzuki Yukari
  - Tohoku Zunko; a teenage female created to promote the recovery of the Tohoku region. She was released as a Vocaloid on June 5, 2014.
  - Kotonoha Akane・Aoi; two females that are a pair of sisters.
  - Minase Kou; a male teacher (like Hiyama Kiyoteru).
  - Kyomachi Seika; a young adult female voiced by Rika Tachibana and produced in collaboration with Tsukurujyo, a production group based in Seika, Kyoto. She was adopted as the district mascot.
  - Tohoku Kiritan; Zunko's youngest sister, a preteen voiced by Himika Akaneya. Produced in collaboration with SSS Co., Ltd.
  - Kizuna Akari
  - Haruno Sora
  - Tohoku Itako; Zunko and Kiritan's oldest sister, a young adult voiced by Ibuki Kido. Also a collaboration with SSS Co., Ltd.
  - Tsuina-chan; based on the character Tsuina the Ogre Hunter, a teenage female voiced by Mai Kadowaki who can speak both Standard and Kansai dialects.
  - Iori Yuzuru; a young male with androgynous design, produced in collaboration with AI Inc.

=== Sound editing and recording ===
- Crazy Talk SE.
- Jam Band

=== Synthesizer V Products ===
==== Synthesizer V Studio Products ====
Product	Language	Sex	Voice Sampled	Release Date
Kotonoha Akane & Aoi	Japanese	Female	Yui Sakakibara	July 30, 2020
Koharu Rikka	Japanese	Female	Yoshino Aoyama	March 18, 2021
Tsurumaki Maki Japanese	Japanese	Female	Manami Tanaka	June 18, 2021
Tsurumaki Maki English	English	Female	Manami Tanaka	June 18, 2021
Tsuina-chan	Japanese	Female	Mai Kadowaki	November 26, 2021
Kyomachi Seika	Japanese	Female	Rika Tachibana	January 27, 2022
Natsuki Karin	Japanese	Female	Miyu Takabi	April 13, 2022
Hanakuma Chifuyu	Japanese	Female	Kaya Okuno	October 20, 2022
Kasane Teto	Japanese	Female	Oyamano Mayo	April 27, 2023
Haruno Sora	Japanese	Female	Kikuko Inoue	August 24, 2023
Frimomen	Japanese	Male	Akira Koga	April 25, 2024
Miyamai Moca	Japanese	Female	Mayu Mineda	September 26, 2024

==== Synthesizer V 2 Products ====
Product	Language	Sex	Voice Sampled	Release Date
Miyamai Moca	Japanese	Female	Mayu Mineda	March 21, 2025
SF-A2 miki	Japanese	Female	Miki Furukawa	March 21, 2025
Hiyama Kiyoteru	Japanese	Male	Kiyoshi Hiyama	March 21, 2025
Tsurumaki Maki	Japanese	Female	Manami Tanaka	July 24, 2025
Haruno Sora	Japanese	Female	Kikuko Inoue	July 24, 2025
Tsuina-chan	Japanese	Female	Mai Kadowaki	July 24, 2025
Kyomachi Seika	Japanese	Female	Rika Tachibana	July 24, 2025
Asumi Shuo	Japanese	Female	Mia Sakurai	August 29, 2025
Asumi Ririse	Japanese	Female	Kana Motomiya	August 29, 2025
Nekomura Iroha	Japanese	Female	Kyounosuke Yoshitate	October 22, 2025
Kasane Teto	Japanese	Female	Oyamano Mayo	November 27, 2025
Frimomen	Japanese	Male	Akira Koga	November 27, 2025
Koharu Rikka	Japanese	Female	Yoshino Aoyama	March 5, 2026
Natsuki Karin	Japanese	Female	Miyu Takabi	March 5, 2026
Hanakuma Chifuyu	Japanese	Female	Kaya Okuno	March 5, 2026
