= Kasane Teto =

Virtual singer

- Original UTAU design of Kasane Teto
- Developers: TwinDrill; AH-Software
- Release: 1 April 2008; 18 years ago
- Stable release: Synthesizer V Studio 2 AI / November 27, 2025; 11 months ago
- Engines: UTAU; TALQu; Synthesizer V; VOICEPEAK; Synthesizer V 2
- Available in: Japanese; English
- Type: Virtual singer
- License: Proprietary
- Website: kasaneteto.jp
- First appearance: UTAU
- Designed by: Sen (線)
- Voiced by: Oyamano Mayo

In-universe information
- Full name: 重音テト (Kasane Teto)
- Gender: Chimera (Note: Teto's gender, like most of her attributes, was chosen at random from suggestions on 2channel. Its true meaning remains unclear and open to interpretation. As such, it is not known whether it refers to her actual gender or her species. According to TwinDrill, she is generally seen as female due to her appearance and voice; however, there are no plans to change the official setting.)
- Vocals-only snippet of "Machine Love" by Jamie Paige, showcasing both UTAU and Synthesizer V AI synthesizers

Kasane Teto (Japanese: 重音テト, pronounced [kasane teꜜto]) is a virtual singer with voicebanks for several singing voice synthesizers. The character was initially created as a joke for April Fools' Day 2008 on the Japanese textboard 2channel, but she was later made into an actual voicebank for UTAU in the same year. Teto has been introduced as a "diva born from a hoax".

Along with the UTAU voicebank, Kasane Teto was released as a voicebank in 2021 for TALQu, a text-to-speech software developed by Haruqa Software, in 2023 for Synthesizer V AI, in 2025 for VOICEPEAK, a text-to-speech software developed by AH-Software, and in 2025 for Synthesizer V 2 AI.

== Character ==
Kasane Teto is officially stated to be 31 years old. In her earliest design, she was 159.5 cm (5 ft 2.8 in) tall and weighed 47 kg (104 lb; 7 st 6 lb). She is listed as liking baguettes (which she is frequently depicted with in fanart) and having a tsundere personality. However, her personality can differ from song to song due to the decentralized nature of the singing voice synthesizer community.

== History ==
=== Creation ===
Kasane Teto's origins come from 2channel, a Japanese textboard. In 2008, a group of users devised a plan to make a fake Vocaloid character. Character names, hairstyles, genders, ages, likes, dislikes, special skills, and other traits were randomly selected from among the suggestions of 2channel users and consolidated into a single character, which would be shown as a prank for April Fools' Day. On 6 April 2008, she appeared for the first time on video, and on 13 April 2008, the first voicebank for Teto was released, with Oyamano Mayo as the voice provider. The first song using her voice was released on 1 June 2008.

The rights holders who provided the character design and voice of Kasane Teto established the circle "TwinDrill" in 2009 to promote and manage the character. Although Kasane Teto was a parody character of Crypton Future Media's series of Vocaloid singers, TwinDrill organised the rights and established a cooperative relationship with Crypton from 2009 to 2010. Since 2010, Crypton has been the point of contact for commercial use.

=== 2010s and 2020s ===
Teto continued to make an impact on the Vocaloid community in the 2010s, with many songs being released. In 2012, a DLC pack for Hatsune Miku: Project DIVA F featured her. In 2013, she appeared as a part of Hatsune Miku's act in the Sapporo Snow Festival.

=== Synthesizer V ===
Music video for "BIRDBRAIN" by Jamie Paige, using the Synthesizer V software

For the 15th anniversary of Teto on 1 April 2023, Japanese software developer AH-Software announced they would be partnering with TwinDrill and Crypton Future Media to produce a Synthesizer V AI voicebank for the character, its first full commercial release. On 3 April 2023, Kasane Teto AI version 104 was announced. For the occasion, a significant redesign was made, giving Teto a new outfit to stand apart from being a Hatsune Miku parody. The deep learning technology in Synthesizer V made use of singing from the voice provider rather than concatenative phoneme samples like UTAU. This allowed for cleaner, more natural and realistic synthesis and various features such as "vocal modes" for expression and the ability to sing in any language that Synthesizer V AI supports via "cross-lingual synthesis". Synthesizer V AI Kasane Teto was released on 27 April 2023, and has received frequent updates. A limited "lite" voicebank for the same software was released soon after on 8 May 2023, available for free download.

On 30 October 2025, AH-Software announced a Kasane Teto voicebank for Synthesizer V 2 AI, which was released on 27 November 2025.

=== VOICEPEAK ===
For Teto's 17th anniversary on 1 April 2025, AH-Software announced an adaptation of Kasane Teto's voice for their VOICEPEAK Japanese text-to-speech software, which was released shortly after on 24 April 2025.

=== Voicebanks ===
Language	Release	Software
Japanese	1 June 2008	UTAU
English	—N/a	UTAU
Multilingual	27 April 2023	Synthesizer V
Japanese	24 April 2025	VOICEPEAK
Multilingual	27 November 2025	Synthesizer V 2

== Reception ==
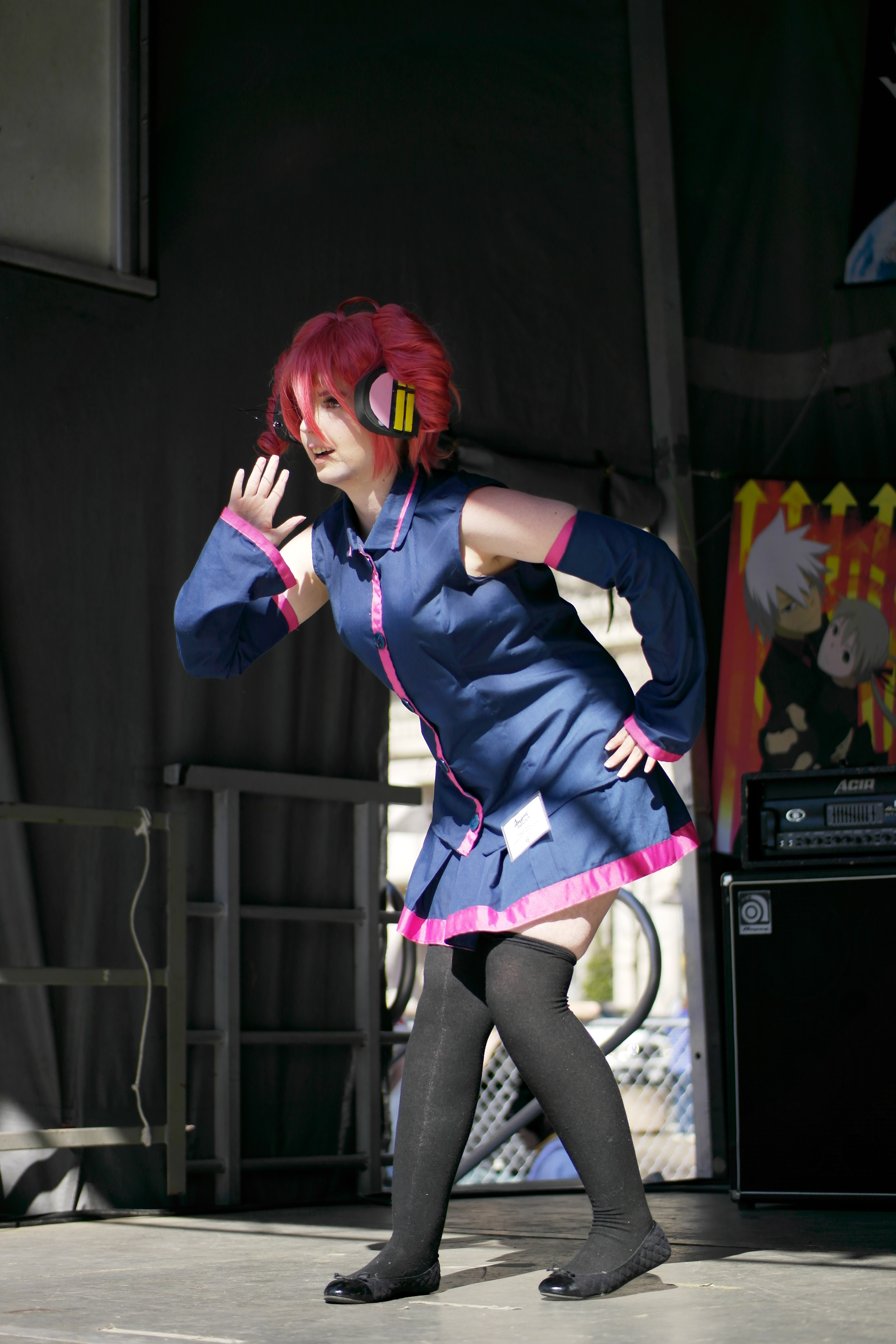
Cosplay of Kasane Teto

Despite not being a Vocaloid character, Kasane Teto has gained popularity among Vocaloid and UTAU fans. Within six months of her release, more than 500 videos with the "Kasane Teto" tag were published on Niconico, and the song "Uso no utahime" (Japanese: 嘘の歌姫, transl. "A Fake Diva") featuring Kasane Teto reached 100,000 views, entering the Vocaloid Hall of Fame. According to stats from the 2025 Music Awards Japan, 5 out of the top 10 most popular Vocaloid tracks in Japan featured Kasane Teto, notably surpassing Hatsune Miku who was featured in 3. Among songs nominated for the 2025 Best Vocaloid Culture Song award, Teto was the second most used voice behind Miku. Tetoris by Hiiragi Magnetite reached over 100 million views, being the first solo Kasane Teto song to do so on YouTube.

=== Notable songs ===
Charted songs with vocals by Kasane Teto
Title	Artist	Year	Peak chart positions		YouTube views	Ref.
Title	Artist	Year	JPN Hot	JPN Niconico Vocaloid	YouTube views	Ref.
"Override"	Yoshida Yasei	2023	75	1	106M	
"Mesmerizer"	Satsuki / 32ki	2024	65	1	209M	
"Tetoris"	Hiiragi Magnetite	2024	35	1	126M	

Kasane Teto songs with awards and nominations
Awards	Category	Song	Artist	Year	Result	Ref.
2025 Music Awards Japan	Best Vocaloid Culture Song	"Override"	Yoshida Yasei	2023	Nominated	
2025 Music Awards Japan	Best Vocaloid Culture Song	"Igaku"	Sasuke Haraguchi	2024	Nominated	
2025 Music Awards Japan	Best Vocaloid Culture Song	"Mesmerizer"	Satsuki / 32ki	2024	Nominated	
2025 Music Awards Japan	Best Vocaloid Culture Song	"Tetoris"	Hiiragi Magnetite	2024	Nominated	
2026 Music Awards Japan	Best Vocaloid Culture Song	"Sānbùzhān o Eroi Me de Miru na"	Yamamoto	2025	Nominated	
2026 Music Awards Japan	Best Vocaloid Culture Song	"Chikubi Nazonazo"	Yamamoto	2025	Nominated	

=== Other media ===
Kasane Teto has appeared in many different media. These include appearing in Sega's music game franchise Hatsune Miku: Project DIVA and the video game Fortnite, becoming a promotional character for Hokkaido Broadcasting, having Nendoroid and other plastic figures from Good Smile Company, performing with Nakamura Shidō II on the Kabuki stage, and receiving novel adaptations.
