= SF-A2 Miki =

Voice synthesizer software

- Vocaloid 4 package version
- Developer: AH-Software Co. Ltd
- Release: December 4, 2009
- Stable release: SF-A2 miki SynthV 2 / March 21, 2025
- Operating system: Windows, Mac
- Available in: Japanese
- Type: Vocal Synthesizer Application

SF-A2 codename miki (SF-A2 開発コード miki) is a female Vocaloid character produced by AH-Software Co. Ltd for Vocaloid 2. Her voice is sampled from the Japanese female singer-songwriter, Miki Furukawa. She later released on Vocaloid 4 and Synthesizer V Studio 2.

== Development ==
SF-A2 was released on the same day as Kaai Yuki and Hiyama Kiyoteru as the 3rd Ah Software Vocaloid. SF-A2 miki's direction is very different from Kaai Yuki and Hiyama Kiyoteru as she was a professional vocal artist. Much of her planning and development was handled by HEARTFAST.

=== Additional software ===
"the box" by 11vein, showcasing the 2025 Synthesizer V iteration of SF-A2 Miki.

Silhouettes for SF-A2 miki, along with the other Vocaloid vocals by AHS, were revealed on a poster on November 6, 2014. However, at the time, it remained unconfirmed as to what they were being used for. On November 20, it was confirmed in the livestream for Vocaloid 4 that they all, with the exception of Tohoku Zunko, will be receiving VOCALOID4 voicebanks. SF-A2 miki's update contains an update of her Vocaloid 2 vocal called "SF-A2 miki - natural".

When interviewed, Tomohide Ogata mentioned he had a feeling SF-A2 Miki was very popular overseas. In another interview, Tomohide Ogata expressed a desire to produce English versions of their Vocals, however, the project is too complex. He went on to explain that because all of their providers are Japanese, they would rather seek English speakers of a similar voice to the Japanese versions from the United States and United Kingdom.

On December 1, 2023, AHS announced that SF-A2 miki would be receiving a Synthesizer V voice bank, set to release sometime in 2024- however it was later delayed until 2025 in order to refine the voice bank's quality. SF-A2 miki eventually received an official release on March 21, 2025, on the Synthesizer V Studio 2 engine instead.

== Characteristics ==
Her design was unique among the VOCALOIDs. She had no references to YAMAHA based musical instruments like other VOCALOIDs and was designed to look cybernetic, giving her a more sci-fi look than most other Vocaloids at the time. According to information that came from the 2012 redesign, Miki was designed to look like she was made out of an inorganic material and was conceptualized as an android. Her body is designed to look like that of a child, but also give her the overall appearance of a young teenage female. Though she is an android, she is covered in muscles made from various materials such as carbon nanotubes, but were made loose to give a mild deformed look about them. Having an immature-looking body allowed her to appear younger than she looks, similar to how Hatsune Miku and Kagamine Rin could do the same.

Name	SF-A2 miki
Suggested Tempo Range	70–170 BPM
Suggested Vocal Range	E2 – G4

== See also ==
- List of Vocaloid products
