= Mesmerizer (song) =

Japanese Vocaloid song

Single by 32ki

from the album Circus's Detail
- Language: Japanese
- Released: April 27, 2024
- Genre: J-pop; happy hardcore
- Length: 2:37
- Songwriter: 32ki

32ki singles chronology
"Cryokinesis" (2023)	"Mesmerizer" (2024)	"Obsolete Meat" (2024)

Music video
- "Mesmerizer" on YouTube

"Mesmerizer" (Japanese: メズマライザー) is a 2024 song by Japanese music producer 32ki (pronounced "Satsuki") featuring vocals by Vocaloid virtual singer Hatsune Miku and Synthesizer V virtual singer Kasane Teto. The song's accompanying animated music video, created by Korean animator "channelcaststation" ("channel" for short), reached 10 million views on YouTube within two weeks of its release, unprecedented for Vocaloid songs. On November 17, 2024, the song reached 100 million views on YouTube, becoming the fastest Vocaloid song in history to reach 100 million views (6 months and 21 days), and on June 27, 2026, "Mesmerizer" surpassed "Young Girl A" to become the most viewed Vocaloid song on YouTube.

On Spotify, "Mesmerizer" is the 2nd most popular song by Hatsune Miku, only surpassed by "Miku" by Anamanaguchi.

== Background and release ==
The music video for "Mesmerizer" was released on April 27, 2024, and the song was released for streaming on May 17. The song was included on 32ki's first album, Circus's Detail, which was released during Niconico Chokaigi 2024. The song's stems have been made available to the public as part of the "Remix Project" at The Vocaloid Collection (known as VocaColle for short), run by Dwango.

== Composition ==
"Mesmerizer" contains a high-density mix, a rhythmic and hooky sound, and lyrics that leave room for interpretation. The song explores the theme of "mesmerism"; the lyrics examine the desire to escape from reality and the danger of losing oneself to escapism.

32ki said that the melody is influenced by "high-speed singing/high range" songs written by such as Japanese music producer Tohma and kemu. Patrick St. Michel of The Japan Times described the song as "jagged sonic textures—with Jersey club touches buried beneath clattering beats—and tops it off with vocals courtesy of Miku and fellow synthesized character Kasane Teto".

"Mesmerizer" is in the key of B-flat minor during the verses and its relative major, D-flat major, during the chorus, with a modulation up a half step to D major for the final chorus. It is written in 4/4 time with a fast tempo of 185 beats per minute. The chorus mainly follows the chord progression IV–V/vi–vi–V–I–IV–V/vi–vi–V/V. The notes of the melody are relatively dissonant in relation to the underlying chords; for example, in D♭ major, the A♭ and G♭ notes above the F dominant seventh chord in the chorus result in a heavily altered F7♭9♯9.

== Music video ==
The music video for the song was created by "channel", (Note: Also known as "channelcaststation".) whose fan-made animation for "Rabbit Hole" by Deco*27 went viral on social media in February 2024. In the music video, Hatsune Miku and Kasane Teto dance to cheerful singing and rhythmic effects, wearing clothing in the style of an American diner. Despite the video's bright visuals and upbeat music, disturbing details are littered throughout. Teto repeatedly uses distress signals, including signing "help" in American Sign Language, showing the Signal for Help, and blinking "SOS" in Morse code. Before the first chorus, she and Miku perform two-finger salutes with their right hands while hiding their left behind their backs, flanking a tridecagram flashing "mesmerizer!!" between them in a formation that resembles "SOS"—this same pose also appears in the video's thumbnail. During the "QUIZ TIME!" segment, the first letters of each answer spell "HELP".

Halfway through the video, Miku succumbs to hypnosis, and she begins to lose control of herself while Teto is shown resisting for several days; both of their eyes gradually fade to black. At the start of the final chorus, Miku descends into madness—dancing wildly with sharp teeth, pitch-black eyes, and tongue out, as the subtitles glitch into mojibake. Teto, visibly frightened, continues to dance with a worried expression, her eyes losing their pupils and irises fading to a dull red. In the final moments, obscured by an excessive amount of confetti, Teto's eyes briefly close before reopening—now pitch black, her distressed expression fading to a vacant smile, implying that she has also been hypnotized.

== Reception ==
The music video for "Mesmerizer" uploaded to YouTube reached 10 million views on May 11, 2024, 13 days later. The song is also the third and fastest song to surpass one million views on Niconico utilizing Synthesizer V, and the second fastest among all Vocaloid songs. On June 27, 2024, the video surpassed 50 million views. A commemorative illustration was made by channel the following day. The song reached 100 million views on YouTube in November 17, becoming the fastest Vocaloid song in history to reach 100 million views (6 months and 21 days). The song has also inspired a large number of Internet memes. Patrick St. Michel argued that the song "shows how Miku and the software she represents remain vital to the musical ecosystem of the 2020s".

On October 2, 2024, the song was included in Sega's rhythm game Hatsune Miku: Colorful Stage!. the song was also included in Chunithm on December 12, 2024, in Beatmania IIDX 32: Pinky Crush on October 9, 2024, in Pop'n Music Jam&Fizz on December 19, 2024, in Dance Dance Revolution World on December 25, 2024, and in Sound Voltex Exceed Gear on January 9, 2025. A doujin turn-based rhythm game has been released.

== Chart performance ==
The song debuted at No. 8 on the Billboard Japan Niconico Vocaloid Songs Top 20 chart for the week, later topping the chart for five consecutive weeks, and entering the top 20 of Japan Songs (South Korea) for three consecutive weeks. It also debuted at No. 65 on the Japan Hot 100 on May 29, 2024. On May 30, 2024, the song reached No. 13 on the Billboard Global Japan Songs excl. Japan chart. Additionally, the song reached number 3 on the Heatseekers Songs chart. In June 2024, the song ranked on Niconico Vocaloid Songs Top 20 mid-year chart for 2024 at number 6 just five weeks after the song's release. The song also ranked on Niconico Vocaloid Songs Top 20 year-end chart for 2024 at number 2.

It ranked No. 2 on the YouTube Japan Daily Top Music Videos chart on May 13, 2024. On May 22, 2024, it debuted at No. 5 on the YouTube Japan Weekly Top Songs chart. Additionally, "Mesmerizer" became the top-searched term on Nico Nico Pedia Weekly Hot Word Ranking on May 8, 2024.

== Charts ==
=== Weekly charts ===
Weekly chart performance for "Mesmerizer"
Chart (2024)	Peak position
Japan (Japan Hot 100)	65
Global (Billboard Global Japan Songs excl. Japan)	13
Heatseekers Songs (Billboard Japan)	3

== Accolades ==
Award nominations for "Mesmerizer"
Year	Award	Category	Result	Ref.
2025	Music Awards Japan	Best Vocaloid Culture Song	Nominated	

== Release history ==
Release dates for "Mesmerizer"
Region	Date	Format
World	May 17, 2024	Digital download; streaming
