= Kyoufuu All Back =

- Cover used in Hatsune Miku: Colorful Stage!

Song by Yukopi feat. Kaai Yuki

from the album Album 1-gou
- Language: Japanese
- Released: November 29, 2023
- Genre: J-pop; Vocaloid
- Length: 2:17
- Songwriter: Yukopi

Music video
- "Kyoufuu All Back" on YouTube

"Kyoufuu All Back" (強風オールバック) is a song by Vocaloid producer Yukopi featuring Kaai Yuki on vocals. The music video was released on March 15, 2023, and the song was later featured on Yukopi's debut album Album 1-gou, released on November 29. The song is humorous and upbeat, with the lyrics focusing on an elementary school girl whose hair is being swept back by the wind. The song's instrumentation makes use of instruments associated with children, such as a recorder and castanets.

The song gained over one million views on YouTube in two weeks, and was the subject of numerous derivative works, including a live action music video recreation, various covers by popular VTubers, and a Cup Noodles commercial parodying the song and its video.

== Composition ==
"Kyoufuu All Back" features vocals from Kaai Yuki, a vocaloid voiced by an anonymous elementary school girl, taking advantage of her childish, yet slightly raspy voice. The song's lyrics are comedic and light-hearted, focusing on the student's hair being swept back by strong winds. The instrumental prominently features a recorder and castanets, instruments commonly played by elementary students, as well as a triangle. The music video depicts Yuki playing the recorder, while the castanets and triangle are played by a crow and a pigeon. The recorder is played in a wobbly, amateur-ish manner, adding to the childish atmosphere. The song also has a slightly monotonous sound.

== Release ==
"Kyoufuu All Back" was released on YouTube on March 15, 2023, gaining over one million views in less than two weeks. It was released with a looping anime-style music video depicting Kaai Yuki, created by the illustrator Ozu. The song would later be released on Yukopi's debut album, Album 1-gou, in November of that year.

== Reception ==
"Kyoufuu All Back" debuted at number two on Billboard Japan's Niconico Vocaloid Songs Top 20 chart, and climbed to number one the following week, holding the position for eleven weeks in total. It placed number one on the year-end chart for 2023. In YouTube's 2023 video rankings for Japan, it placed second, with first place being Yoasobi's "Idol". On November 2, 2024, it surpassed 100 million views on YouTube. Writing for KAI-YOU, Yugaming praises Ozu's animation and the song's "simple but relatable" lyrics. Real Sound's Natsume Soga calls Kaai Yuki's voice "not purely cute" and describes it as having a "hint of languidness", which is stated to be one of the song's charm points.

As with many Vocaloid songs, it attracted derivative works, including parody animations and cover versions by VTubers, including Hololive's Gawr Gura. One notable derivative work is the live action music video recreation made by Sushi Ramen Riku, which appeared in the trending videos on YouTube. In July of 2023, the song was featured in a commercial for Cup Noodles, adapted with new lyrics and a new animation, also featuring Kaai Yuki. Merchandise has been made based on the song, including a plush toy and a figure. The song has also appeared in the rhythm game titled Taiko no Tatsujin.

== Charts ==
=== Weekly charts ===
Weekly chart performance for "Kyoufuu All Back"
Chart	Peak position
Billboard Japan Heatseekers Songs	17
Billboard Japan Top User Generated Songs	2
Billboard Japan Niconico Vocaloid Songs Top 20	1

=== Year-end charts ===
2025 year-end chart performance for "Kyoufuu All Back"
Chart	Position
Billboard Japan Top User Generated Songs	5
Billboard Japan 2023 Year-End Niconico Vocaloid Songs	1
