= Macne series =

Voice banks for Reason and GarageBand

The Macne series (Mac音シリーズ) is a series of voice banks designed for Reason and GarageBand, music sequencer software for the Macintosh operating system, developed by MI7 Japan and distributed by Act2. They are sold under an Open-source license. Following the release of the Vocaloid "Neo" version for the Mac, several hints were left on Macne Nana's Twitter that an official Vocaloid voicebank was in progress. It was confirmed and announced later in October 2013 that Macne Nana would be released for both the Vocaloid 3 software and the Vocaloid Neo software on January 31, 2014.

== History ==
The Macne series interface Macne Nana version

The idea of releasing a voicebank for Macintosh computers was conceptualized in the Japanese voice actress Haruna Ikezawa's regular column "天声姫語 Vox Reginae, Vox Dei" ("voice of the queen, voice of god," a spoof of Asahi Shimbun's editorial article "天声人語 Vox Populi, Vox Dei" or "voice of the people, voice of god") carried in the magazine Mac Fan by Mainichi Communications. It followed the success story of Hatsune Miku, a voice produced for the Vocaloid software, which was produced for Microsoft Windows only but has no connection to the Vocaloid software's development. The Macne series gained popularity after it was discovered that the sound files could be imported into the singing software Utau.

A plan was made to introduce new characters to the series in 2012, and as of October 2012, a selection of finalists had been chosen.

In late December, the concept of turning all the Macne series into Vocaloid was spoken about. The most major factor in the process was the cost of doing so.

== Characters ==
The Macne vocals are set up as a family unit with each "character" given a distinct personality.

=== Macne Nana ===
Macne Nana (Mac音ナナ/マクネナナ) is cheerful and positive (but a little clumsy), she is accident prone but always looks on the bright side of things even when running late for work. Macne Nana is about 14 or 15 years old according to her official profile.

=== Macne Petit ===
Originally labelled Macne Nana Petit (Mac音ナナ Petit), Macne Petit (Mac音プチ/マクネプチ) is the "straight man" of the Macne house, she keeps the family together and makes sure they are not divided. Although generally the quiet one, she would rather have a conversation with someone then watch things go wrong. She is 10 years old and currently is the youngest member of the family.

=== Macne Coco (white) ===
Macne Coco White (Mac音ココ[白]) is friendly, calm and mature. She is responsible for keeping the general Macne home running and works at "Macne Cafe" (Mac音カフェ). Though she is always smiling, others do not wish to see what her angry face might look like so everyone smiles back at her. She and her twin sister Macne Coco Black are 17 years old and currently the eldest two daughters of the Macne family.

=== Macne Coco (black) ===
Macne Coco Black (Mac音ココ[黒]) easily gets emotional. Compared to her sister White, she loses her temper easily and cries quite easily. Whereas Coco White runs the general work of the Macne household, Coco Black is incapable of holding responsibilities beyond tasks like selling candy sticks. Coco black is also the ignorance queen of the Macne household and often puts her looks first.

=== Macne Papa ===
Macne Papa (Mac音パパ) is a mature, cool, and collected character in comparison with his "daughters". According to his profile he is hardly home and is often flying around the world, but ensures that treasures and parts are sent back home every month from his travels. His line of work, however, is unclear, but when he retires from his work his clothes and attitude change. His age is put at between 40 and 49.

=== Whisper☆Angel Sasayaki ===
Whisper☆Angel Sasayaki (ウィスパー☆エンジェルささやきさん) is a sweet and angelic child. She has a magic transformation wand from her ancestors and is a transformed version of Macne Petit. Sasayaki also whispers 3,389 the whisper of a regular person. In her profile it questions why Petit was given the wand and who this girl of mystery (Sasayaki) is.

== Products ==
All Macne products were built for the Japanese Language and therefore include only the 50 sounds needed for Japanese pronunciation. Each vocal is recorded in 3 different scales. Except for Macne Nana, the Macnes are built primary for the GarageBand software.

- Macne Nana – female singer, sampled from Haruna Ikezawa. She had 104 units sounds and is the only product who could do Reason4 and Garageband. She was released on March 28, 2009.
- Macne Nana Petit – female singer, sampled from Haruna Ikezawa. She had the same samples as Macne Nana, although was originally missing the bass and treble sounds. An expansion pack was later released to include these missing sounds fleshing out her sample base to 104 units of sound. She only covered Garageband She was released on March 28, 2009.
- Macne Coco (White) – mature female singer, sampled from Kikuko Inoue. She had 115 units of sound and sung in the scale of "G" and was built for GarageBand and the Apple Loops Utility. This product was originally called just Macne Coco prior to the release of Macne Coco Black. She was released on September 30, 2009.
- Macne Papa – male singer, a special six-day event version upon his release also included samples of the voice actor Jōji Nakata. He was recorded in the scale of "D" and also worked with Apple Loops Utility. He was made up of 118 units of sound. He was released on April 30, 2010.
- Macne Coco (Black) – mature female singer, sampled from Kikuko Inoue. She has 115 units of sound and is recorded in the scale of "C, C#, D♭, D, B♭, and B" and was built for GarageBand and the Apple Loops Utility. She was released on June 6, 2010.
- Macne Coco (Black), second version – mature female singer, sampled from Kikuko Inoue, update on the previous version. This version was released in Feb 2011. She has 117 units of sound and is recorded in the scale of "D4".
- Whisper☆Angel Sasayaki – whispery voiced female singer, sampled from Haruna Ikezawa. This includes a UTAU vocal library and also works with the Apple Loops Utility. She was recorded with 117 units of sound and was recorded in the 3 scales of D#4/G#4/C#5.
- Macne Nana 2S – update of Macne Nana. Her samples are recorded in 117 units. The Japanese language was recorded in the 3 scales of D#4/G#4/C#5. She was released on March 28, 2012 as part of the 3 year anniversary of the series. This product also included a UTAU vocal library.
- Macne Petit 2S – update of Macne Nana Petit, unlike the previous "Macne Nana Petit" version, Macne Petit has her own unique voice. Her samples are recorded in 117 units. The Japanese language was recorded in the 3 scales of D#4/G#4/C#5. She was released on March 28, 2012 as part of the 3 year anniversary of the series. This product also included a UTAU vocal library and works with the Apple Loops Utility.
- Vocaloid 3 Macne Nana – Vocaloid 3 update of Macne Nana. Includes newly recorded Japanese and English voice databanks compatible for both the Windows Vocaloid 3 editor and the Mac Vocaloid Neo editor. She was released on January 31, 2014. Pre-order bonuses include a disc containing extra features such as an exclusive radio interview with Haruna Ikezawa and Gomoku Akatsuki, high resolution wallpapers designed by illustrator Gomoku Akatsuki, and special limited version of the Macne Nana 2S software. Several customers who also pre-ordered also received 1 of 10 special, hand-drawn, autographed sketches of Macne Nana signed by Haruna and Gomoku as part of a prize draw.

== See also ==
- Vocaloid
- Cantor
- Computer music
- Dōjin music
- Utau
- Voiceroid
