= Hiyama Kiyoteru =

Singing voice synthesizer developed by AH-Software

- Hiyama Kiyoteru V4 - "Natural" + "Rock" package
- Developer: AH-Software Co. Ltd.
- Release: December 4, 2009
- Stable release: Hiyama Kiyoteru V4 / October 29th, 2015
- Operating system: Windows, Mac
- Available in: Japanese
- Type: Vocal Synthesizer Application

Hiyama Kiyoteru (氷山キヨテル) is a masculine vocaloid character produced by AH-Software Co. Ltd and released originally for Vocaloid 2. His voice is provided by Japanese male singer Kiyoshi Hiyama.

== Development ==
He was released on the same day as Kaai Yuki and SF-A2 Miki with Kaai Yuki and he being released as "student" and "teacher" vocals. The voice who had been sampled for him had been secret for a time, however, Kiyoshi himself announced it on Nico Nico Live on August 12, 2010.

His vocals were one of the Vocaloid 2 male vocals which was used in reference to the creation of VY2.

=== Additional software ===
Silhouettes for the AH-Software Vocaloid 2 vocals were revealed on a poster on November 6, 2014; however, it was unconfirmed what they were for at the time. On November 20, it was confirmed in the livestream for Vocaloid 4 that they all, with the exception of Tohoku Zunko, would receive updated vocals for the new engine. Kiyoteru's new vocals were recorded from scratch to improve his upper and lower ranges. Kiyoteru was confirmed to receive a "Natural" and "Rock" vocal for his Vocaloid release, allowing him to make use of the cross-synthesis feature in Vocaloid 4.

In an interview, Tomohide Ogata expressed a desire to produce English versions of their Vocals, however, the project is too complex. He went on to explain that because all of their providers are Japanese, they would rather seek English speakers of a similar voice to the Japanese versions from the United States and United Kingdom.

On December 1, 2023, via an AHS livestream, it was announced that Kiyoteru would receive a voicebank alongside SF-A2 Miki for the Synthesizer V Studio engine. Originally, the two were supposed to be released in 2024 for their 15th anniversary, but the date was postponed in order to release as a part of the up-and-coming Synthesizer V Studio 2.

== Characteristics ==
Kiyoteru's tie clip is a motif of YAMAHA's electric upright bass SLB100 and his glasses are ZS92001A by Zoff.

Kiyoteru is a teacher who participates in a rock band called Ice Mountain on weekends, with the stage name "Ice Mountain Teru". He is also said to be good at mathematics. "Ice Mountain" were featured in a book of the same name, and all members were given biography details in relation to this. According to the book, the default configuration for his software package happens to be Kiyoteru's vocals as a rookie singer.

Name	Hiyama Kiyoteru
Age	22
Height	6 feet 1 inch
Weight	95 kg/209 lb
Suggested Tempo Range	60~160bpm (V2, Natural), 70–190bpm (Rock)
Suggested Vocal Range	C2 - G3 (V2), A1~C4 (Natural), C2~G4 (Rock)

== See also ==
- List of Vocaloid products
