= Nekomura Iroha =

Vocaloid voicebank

- Nekomura Iroha V4 "Natural" + "Soft" package
- Developer: AH-Software Co. Ltd
- Release: October 22, 2010
- Stable release: Nekomura Iroha SynthV 2 / October 22, 2025
- Operating system: Windows, Mac
- Available in: Japanese
- Type: Vocal Synthesizer Application
- Website: homepage

Nekomura Iroha (猫村いろは) is a female Vocaloid voicebank produced by AH-Software Co. Ltd for Vocaloid 2. The voice sampled for her was confirmed to be that of singer Kyounosuke Yoshitate. She is illustrated by okama, a Japanese manga artist and illustrator. She later released on Vocaloid 4 and Synthesizer V Studio 2.

== Development ==
She was originally designed by Sanrio for Comiket in 2009.

In October 2010, Iroha was released for Vocaloid 2 with two demo songs, her appearance, and her name. Her voice provider was initially unknown. However, it was said that the voice provider was a female professional singer who passed the audition test set by AH-Software.

Nekomura was one of the vocals set to be released by e-capsule.

=== Additional software ===
Silhouettes for Nekomura Iroha, along with the other vocals by AHS, were revealed on a poster on November 6, 2014, however, at the time, it was unconfirmed what they were for. On November 20, it was confirmed in the livestream for Vocaloid 4 that they all, with the exception of Tohoku Zunko, will be receiving Vocaloid 4 updates. On May 14, AH-Software confirmed that Iroha would have a Natural and a Soft voicebank, which allows her to use Cross synthesis and she would release on June 18, 2015. It was also revealed that the design shown in April was for her Soft voicebank. Iroha's Natural and Soft voicebanks would be available for purchase individually or together, and a starter pack version would also be offered.

In another interview, Tomohide Ogata expressed a desire to produce English versions of their voicebanks, including Iroha, but expressed that he'd prefer to find similar-sounding English voice actors.

On May 14, 2025, AHS announced that Nekomura Iroha would be receiving a Synthesizer V Studio 2 voice bank, which would eventually release on October 22 of the same year. Despite coming out to the public as being a trans man and hormone replacement therapy changing his voice, the original voice provider Kyounosuke Yoshitate reprised his role as Nekomura Iroha.

== Characteristics ==
Iroha is canonically a "Kittyler", someone who loves the Sanrio character Hello Kitty. She joined the Hello Kitty to Issho! Project in early August 2010. According to her official profile on the Hello Kitty to Issho! page, she is interested in Hello Kitty and wants to become a "Platinum Kitty". Also a story about how she became a Kittyler was included.

The speakers encasing her hands are called Dynamic-Phonon Busters. The other set of speakers are called Chorus-speakers. Each of these move around, supporting her. The floating microphone collects her voice, and Announce Booth, which is on her head, works as an amplifier that divides sounds into three classes for the speakers, according to ranges: the sound frequencies for tweeters, mid-range speakers and woofers.

Name	Nekomura Iroha
Suggested Tempo Range	70–170 bpm (V2, natural), 50–130 bpm (soft)
Suggested Vocal Range	E2 ~ G4 (V2, natural), F2 ~ F♭4 (soft)

== See also ==
- List of Vocaloid products
- Hello Kitty
