= NIAONiao Virtual Singer =

Chinese vocal synthesizer

- Screenshot of BETA interface
- Developer: dsound
- Release: August 17, 2011; 14 years ago
- Stable release: v2.2.00.
- Operating system: Windows XP SP2 and above
- Available in: Chinese
- Type: Voice synthesizer
- License: Freeware
- Website: dsoundsoft.com/product/niaoeditor/

NIAONiao Virtual Singer (Chinese: 袅袅虚拟歌手) is a freeware vocal synthesizer application built for the Chinese and is the first singing vocal synthesizer made in China.

== Overview ==
The software works similarly to the Vocaloid software by Yamaha and another free shareware software called UTAU.

The default voicebank is named Yu Niaoniao (余袅袅), however additional voicebanks can be made manually to produce new vocals and additional languages are possible. The website for the software offers several other vocals for download.

The main samples are packed in a single large file. NIAONiao can have final consonants in a voice, since it is built for the Chinese language. There is a panel at the bottom for controlling parameters, pitchbends, and vibrato.

NIAONiao can import MIDI files, VSQX files, and UST files, export tracks as the "Niao" file format (*.nn), and render vocal tracks directly as WAV, MP3, or MIDI files.
