= Siinamota =

Japanese musician

siinamota
- Also known as: Mizoguchi Ryo (溝口遼); Powapowa-P; Shiina Mota
- Born: 9 March 1995; Ishikawa Prefecture, Japan
- Died: 23 July 2015 (aged 20)
- Occupations: Musician; songwriter; composer
- Instruments: Vocaloid; keyboards
- Website: siinamota.com/en/home

Ryō Mizoguchi (Japanese: 溝口 遼, Hepburn: Mizoguchi Ryō; 9 March 1995 – 23 July 2015), also known by the aliases Siinamota (Japanese: 椎名 もた, Hepburn: Shiinamota; stylized as siinamota) and Powapowa-P (Japanese: ぽわぽわP), was a Japanese keyboardist, lyricist, and composer.

He is regarded as one of the most influential Vocaloid producers of all time and is most well known for the song "Young Girl A" (少女A, Shōjo Ē), which became the most streamed Vocaloid song ever in 2023. His music uses a mix of soft rock, piano, and electronic rhythms.

== Biography ==
=== Early life ===
A native of Komatsu, Ishikawa Prefecture, Siinamota began to learn music at the age of 14, beginning with the electric keyboard. He later joined his school band, but quit due to bullying; he was drawn to Vocaloid as a form of music that could be created alone.

=== Career ===
He began releasing music under the name Powapowa-P (ぽわぽわP) in 7th grade, posting his first work on the Japanese video-sharing site Niconico in 2009. He quickly found success with songs like "Strobe Last," which gained over 500,000 views. In 2011, he stopped creating music due to problems with his home and school environment, as well as online bullying. However, he resumed after being reached out to by the label GINGA, a label specializing in underground and niche Vocaloid music. He released the album Yume no manimani (夢のまにまに), in March of 2012; unlike most Vocaloid albums which primarily featured characters like Hatsune Miku, the album cover was simple and emphasized Siinamota's role as the composer. The album was well-received and followed with an EP, Kokegane no uta (コケガネのうた) in February 2013.

Siinamota moved to Tokyo alone at the age of 17 to pursue music, transferring to the electronic music label U/M/A/A Inc. He released his second album Alterour setsuna pop (アルターワー・セツナポップ) half a year later in 2013, naming the final song "Goodbye Everyone" as his favorite track. This album features Ario, an UTAU voicebank he created with his own voice.

In addition to releasing music, he also wrote comics for COMIC@LOID, a magazine collecting manga inspired by Vocaloid music. In 2014, he formed a band with 5 others called Kenzen Tōhi Kai (健全逃避会), with whom he created an acoustic album entitled Taiku taikō monorōgu (体躯退行モノローグ).

Siinamota's third studio album Ikiru (生きる) - "to live" - was released on 4 March 2015. A fourth album, Ponkotsu Odyssey (ポンコツ・オデッセイ) was announced in April 2015, and was released at the Vocaloid Doujin Convention VOC@LOID M@STER31 on 25 April.

On 23 July 2015, he released Please Give Me a Red Pen, his final song. The name stems from the Japanese belief that writing a name in red pen gives bad luck to the name written, because of its use on gravestones.

On the same day, U/M/A/A Inc. released a statement that Siinamota had passed away at the age of 20, with his cause of death undisclosed. His funeral and memorial service were attended by close relatives only, and the wake was held in the form of an event with a DJ at the request of the family.

On July 23 2019, exactly four years after his death, an album called Therefor. (故に。) compiling some of his unfinished and unreleased songs was released posthumously. The songs were completed by select label staff and close friends, who made minimal changes to keep the songs as close as possible to Siinamota's original vision.

In 2023, a resurgence in interest in Vocaloid led to the 2013 release "Young Girl A," originally a single from his 2013 album Ikiru, gaining a massive number of streams. The song attained over 212 million views on YouTube, reaching 100 million views on 24 July 2024, with the song's streams on Spotify reaching this number four months earlier. Among different platforms, it reached over 7.5 billion plays, making "Young Girl A" the most viewed Vocaloid song on YouTube as of August 2026. The song was nominated for Top Global Hit From Japan in 2023 by Music Awards Japan.

On March 9 2026, a project titled "You meet siinamota" was launched to commemorate the tenth anniversary of his passing. The project encouraged fans to remix the breakout hit "Young Girl A" as well as four other tracks - "astronotes," "Q," "strobe last," and "city lights" - by uploading the stems of each song. Fans could upload their works inspired by Siinamota's music online to be included in playlists and other promotional material.

=== Musical influences ===
Siinamota named artists Utada Hikaru (noting specifically the album ULTRA BLUE), Sakanaction, and Ringo Sheena as favorites. He also cited the Vocaloid producer sasakure.UK as an influence. He was also influenced by manga, taking the name "kokegane" from a manga. He did not subscribe to one particular genre, loosely describing his music as pop.

== Discography ==
This list does not include remasters of previous albums or compilations featuring Siinamota. Posthumous works are marked with an asterisk (*).

=== Studio albums ===
- Sepia Record (セピアレコード) (24 November 2010)
- AWARD STROBE HELLO (4 September 2011)
- alpa (19 November 2011)
- Yume no manimani (7 March 2012)
- mousou new world (8 July 2012)
- Powapoworks (27 April 2013)
- Alterour setsuna pop (9 October 2013)
- Living (4 March 2015)
- *Therefor. (23 July 2019)
- *Powapoworks - Last (23 July 2019).

=== Extended plays ===
- "Strobe Last EP" (1 June 2011)
- "1,Repeat 2,Sleeping 3,Overdose" (28 December 2011)
- "Kokegane no uta" (6 March 2013)
- "2LINES EP" (7 July 2013)
- "Ghosts in the Forest EP" (13 August 2014)
