= Vocaloid 7 =

2026 singing voice synthesizer

- Original author: Yamaha Corporation
- Developer: Yamaha Corporation
- Release: November 11, 2026
- Stable release: 7.0.1 / November 19, 2026
- Written in: C#
- Operating system: Microsoft Windows macOS
- Predecessor: Vocaloid 6
- Available in: Japanese, English, Spanish, Korean, Chinese
- Type: Voice Synthesizer Software
- License: Proprietary
- Website: www.vocaloid.com/en/

Vocaloid 7 is a singing vocal synthesizer application developed by Yamaha Corporation and is the successor to Vocaloid 6 in the Vocaloid series.

It features a second-generation machine learning Vocaloid:AI engine for vocal synthesis.

== History ==
On October 9, 2026, Yamaha announced that Vocaloid 7 would be released with a release date of November 11. Following scheduled website maintenance on release day, it replaced the prior Vocaloid 6 offerings. Feature additions included introduction of a second-generation Vocaloid:AI engine for more realistic vocals, new and enhanced parameters for better control and a bundled voice called Asa. Support for older Vocaloid 3 - 6 voicebanks remains.

== Products ==
=== AI Megpoid ===
A feminine voice, based on singer Megumi Nakajima and released separately on November 11. It serves as an upgrade of the Vocaloid 6 AI Megpoid voice.

=== GekiyakuV and KazehikiV ===
Feminine and a masculine voices sold separately, released on November 11 as an upgrade of their Vocaloid 6 versions.

=== NurseRobot_TypeT ===
A feminine voice released on November 11 and an upgrade of the Vocaloid 6 voice.

=== Luci ===
A feminine voice based on singer and creator Akatsuki Ruki, released on November 11.
