= Animation music =

Music created to accompany an animation

Animation music is original music written specifically to accompany an animation.

== History ==
One of the first American animation songs is "Minnie's Yoo Hoo" (1930). In Japan, anime music has reached the top 10 of the weekly Oricon Singles Chart.

== Notable composers ==
- Carl Stalling
- Scott Bradley
- Winston Sharples
- Darrell Calker
- Joe Hisaishi
- Yoko Kanno
- Alf Clausen
- Mark Mothersbaugh
- Richard Stone

== Notable films and shows with animation music ==
- Looney Tunes
- Tom and Jerry
- The Simpsons
- Rugrats
- Animaniacs
- Silly Symphonies

== See also ==
- Anime composer
- Anime music
- Anime music video
- Mickey Mousing
- Production music
