= IA (software) =

Vocal synthesis software

- IA duo package starter pack
- Developers: 1st Place Co., Ltd.
- Release: January 27, 2012
- Stable release: IA :[R] / January 27, 2026
- Written in: Japanese and English
- Operating system: Windows
- Platform: PC, Mac
- Available in: Japanese and English
- Type: Vocal Synthesizer Application
- License: Proprietary
- Website: 1st Place Co., Ltd.

IA (Japanese: イア) is a humanoid persona voiced by a singing synthesizer application developed by 1st Place Co., Ltd., headquartered in Meguro, Tokyo, Japan. She uses Yamaha Corporation's Vocaloid 3 singing synthesizer technology. Her voice is created using samples of Lia. She has performed at live concerts onstage as either an animated projection or a Pepper's ghost. A rhythm game featuring her called IA/VT Colorful was made. Many songs have been made with her.

IA's name was taken from her voice provider's name, "Lia". She was illustrated by Aka Akasaka, the author of Kaguya-sama: Love Is War and Oshi no Ko.

== Development ==
After Lia got married and became pregnant in 2009, she was forced to put her career on hold. Because of this, production began on IA as a way to "stand in" as a substitute during the singer's absence.

IA was developed by 1st Place Co., Ltd. using Yamaha's Vocaloid 3. Her voice was created by taking voice samples from Japanese singer Lia at a controlled pitch and tone. She was the first release for the "Aria on the Planetes" project, of which the CeVIO Creative Studio vocal, also made by 1st Place, named "One", is also a part of.

The design philosophy 1st Place worked toward was to make the voice simple but easy to adjust and customize, letting creators create their own version of IA.

In October 2013, IA's software was announced to have an update for the Mac during the promotional period for the IA × Super GT Circuit Beats album.

=== Additional software ===
In 2014, a prototype vocal called "IA -Aria On the Planetes- α Type C" was released as a free trial version via a one-month-long feedback campaign.

On June 27, 2014, a new add-on for IA, called IA ROCKS, was released. Once imported into the Vocaloid 4, it was possible to cross-synthesis the two vocals.

In January 2016, it was announced she would be released for CeVIO Creative Studio, receiving a talking vocal; this was released in 2018.

In January 2026, a new version called "IA :[R] -Aria On the Planetes-" was released for Vocaloid 6.

== Marketing ==
Information on IA was released much more slowly than the average Vocaloid, with her promotions being seemingly otherworldly and mysterious.

The licensing for IA is slightly different than past Vocaloids. Unlike some past Vocaloids, users can use her image on CDs, flyers and posters without requesting permission, although some consent from the company is needed for greater use of her image. This is a departure from past Vocaloids such as Crypton Future Media, which requires permission for use of their Vocaloids' images on things such as CDs, flyers and posters.

== Characteristics ==
Name	IA
Release	January 27, 2012
Suggested genre	Pop, jazz
Suggested tempo	63–228 bpm, 95–228 bpm (rocks)
Suggested vocal range	B2-A4

== Featured music ==
"Children Record" (チルドレンレコード) by Jin is considered one of her most popular songs with over 3,000,000 views on Niconico and over 18,000,000 views on YouTube.

"Six Trillion Years and Overnight Story" (六兆年と一夜物語) by Kemu is also considered to be one of her most popular songs, with over 8,000,000 views on Niconico and over 54,000,000 views on YouTube.

"Night Sky Patrol of Tomorrow" (アスノヨゾラ哨戒班) by Orangestar is the most viewed IA song on YouTube with over 61,000,000 views, followed by "DAYBREAK FRONTLINE" by the same producer with over 57,000,000 views on YouTube.
