= Macne Nana =

Voicebank developed for Reason and GarageBand

- Macne Nana Vocaloid 3 Japanese and English bundle
- Developers: MI7 Japan; Yamaha Corporation
- Release: March 28, 2009
- Stable release: Macne Nana V4 / December 15, 2016
- Operating system: Microsoft Windows macOS
- Available in: Japanese, English
- Type: Voice Synthesizer Software
- License: Proprietary
- Website: Official website

Macne Nana (Mac音ナナ/マクネナナ, Makune Nana) is a vocal developed for Mac computers for Reason and GarageBand. Her Garageband and Reason voicebanks were able to be ported over into UTAU, and later on, she was released for Vocaloid 3.

== Development ==
In 2008, VOCALOID was only available on Windows, and there was no equivalent software for the Mac. This inspired Haruna Ikezawa to start working on something using her own voice: Macne Nana. Macne Nana was released as the first member of the Macne series (Mac音シリーズ). It followed the success story of Hatsune Miku, a voice produced for the Vocaloid software which was produced for Microsoft Windows only.

Macne Nana, along with a cheaper alternative compact version called "Macne Nana Petit (Mac音ナナ Petit)", released on March 28, 2009 for the software Reason and GarageBand. She possessed 104 sounds, while the Nana Petit version had less samples as it lacked the triple and bass ranges.

This led to a series of vocals similarly to Nana being added to the "Macne Family". Users were also able to take advantage of the Macne Nana and Macne Nana Petit's open license status to exploit her vocals into other software; this had led to UTAU conversions existing.

=== Additional Software ===
A later version of the software "Macne Nana 2S" was created, the character of "Macne Nana Petit" had become by this point Nana's younger sister "Macne Petit (マクネプチ (Mac音プチ)" and was released with a vocal called "Macne Petit 2S" on the same day. The 2S version had improved performance and was released with an already converted UTAU vocal. This version was recorded in the scales of D#4/G#4/C#5 and had 117 samples, more than the first Macne Nana release.

After the news of the Mac version of the engine "Vocaloid Neo" was released, a Vocaloid was considered. However, though the news was interesting, as a Magazine editor Haruna Ikezawa had no budget for a Vocaloid production. Later, after things were sorted to produce the Vocaloid 3 version, teasers were left hinting at Macne Nana being produced for Vocaloid 3. This was later confirmed on Macne Nana's Twitter account.

According to Mac Fan magazine, there was a conversation with Yamaha; no money was involved and the OK was given for the voice of Haruna Ikezawa to become a Vocaloid release. The vocal would be reviewed at 70% completion. If the vocal does not meet with expectations, it will be scrapped. It will only be put forward to commercial release if the vocal is satisfactory. In October 2013, it was confirmed she was going ahead and that she would have both a PC version and a Mac version, with Bplats doing the recording. It was also confirmed she would include an English as well as a Japanese vocal.

It was mentioned in an interview that a Chinese vocal was not completely out of question yet, as they made a test vocal for Nana in that language. However, it is not a complete version so they don't guarantee a release for it.

== Competition ==
Those who pre-ordered the Vocaloid 3 version were entered into a competition to win one of 10 signed hand-drawn pictures by Haruna Ikezawa and Gomoku Akatsuki (あかつきごもく).

== Characteristics ==
She is the third eldest daughter of the Macne family and the main star of the Macne series itself alongside her younger sister Macne Petit. Macne Nana is cheerful and positive (but a little clumsy), she is accident prone but always looks on the bright side of things even when running late for work. Macne Nana is about 14 or 15 years old according to her official profile, her 3 sizes are B87 W57 H87 with a height of 157 cm or 5' 2" (5.150 ft).

== See also ==
- List of Vocaloid products
