= Kotonoha Akane/Aoi =

Japanese VOICEROID voicebank

Kotonoha Akane & Kotonoha Aoi
- Official illustration, Synthesizer V
- Developers: AI, Inc. AH-Software Co. Ltd.
- Release: April 25, 2014
- Stable release: AI VOICE 2: Kotonoha Akane ＆ Aoi / December 22, 2023
- Operating system: see #Development
- Available in: Japanese, English, Mandarin
- Type: Vocal Synthesizer Application
- Website: https://aivoice.jp/character/kotonoha/

Kotonoha Akane & Aoi (Japanese: 琴葉茜・葵) are a pair of Japanese VOICEROID+ voicebanks released 25 April 2014. They were produced by AI, Inc. using AITalk and distributed by AH-Software, with voiced by Yui Sakakibara.

== Development ==
Year	Software	Voicebanks	Engine	Application	Operating system
Text-to-speech
2014	Kotonoha Akane & Aoi (VOICEROID+)	—N/a	AITalk 3	—N/a	Windows
2017	Kotonoha Akane & Aoi (VOICEROID2)	Kotonoha Akane; Kotonoha Aoi	AITalk 4	Voiceroid 2	Windows
2020	Kotonoha Akane & Aoi (A.I.VOICE)	Kotonoha Akane; Kotonoha Aoi; Kotonoha Akane Tsubomi; Kotonoha Aoi Tsubomi	AITalk 5	A.I.Voice Editor	Windows
2021	A.I.Voice Kotonoha Akane & Aoi English	Kotonoha Akane (English); Kotonoha Aoi (English)	Unknown	A.I.Voice Editor	Windows
2022	Kotonoha Talk Chinese	Kotonoha Akane（Chinese）; Kotonoha Aoi（Chinese）	Unknown	A.I.Voice Editor	Windows
2023	Kotonoha Akane & Aoi (A.I.VOICE2)	Kotonoha Akane (NV); Kotonoha Akane Tsubomi (NV); Kotonoha Aoi (NV); Kotonoha Aoi Tsubomi (NV)	AITalk 6	A.I.Voice 2 Editor	Windows; macOS
Singing voice synthesis
2020	Kotonoha Akane & Aoi (Synthesizer V Studio)	Kotonoha Akane & Aoi	Synthesizer V Standard	Synthesizer V Studio	Linux; macOS; Windows
2022	Kotonoha Akane & Aoi Song Library (NEUTRINO)	Kotonoha Akane; Kotonoha Aoi	Unknown	Neutrino	Google Colaboratory; macOS; Windows
Voice conversion
2021	Kotonoha Akane & Aoi Voice Model for Voidol	Kotonoha Akane; Kotonoha Aoi	R.C.voice	Voidol	iPadOS; iOS; macOS; Windows
2022	Kotonoha Akane & Aoi (Seiren Voice)	Kotonoha Akane & Aoi	Unknown	Seiren Voice	Windows

=== Text-to-speech ===
Kotonoha Akane & Kotonoha Aoi's VOICEROID+ voicebank was distributed by AH-Software and released on 25 April 2014. The VOICEROID2 voicebank released on 9 June 2017, added a Voice Style feature.

On 22 February 2020, a text-to-speech synthesizer software A.I.VOICE released the product "A.I.Voice Kotonoha Akane & Aoi", added two voicebanks with younger voices, Kotonoha Akane Tsubomi and Kotonoha Aoi Tsubomi. The English version released on 10 December 2021 and Chinese on 22, September, 2022.

=== Singing voice synthesis ===
Kotonoha Akane & Aoi's shared singing library for Synthesizer V Studio produced by AH-Software released on June 26, 2020. The recommended rhythm is between 70 and 180 bpm, and the recommended range is between E3 and D5. The included scales are G ♯ 3, C ♯ 4, F ♯ 4, and C5 (falsetto).

The NEUTRINO's Kotonoha Akane & Aoi singing voice library have been available for free to users who purchase "A.I.Voice Kotonoha Akane & Aoi" since 25 April 2022. The recommended range for Kotonoha Akane is between mid1G and hiC (G3 to C5), with a recommended rhythm of 120 to 180 bpm, and the recommended genres are rock, pop music, etc.; The recommended range for Kotonoha Aoi is between mid1G and hiC (G3 to C5), with a recommended rhythm of 80 to 140 bpm, and the recommended genres are pop, folk music, etc.

=== Voice conversion ===
The voice model library of Kotonoha Akane & Aoi for an AI voice conversion application Voidol was produced by Crimson and released on 12 October 2021. Released on 17 May 2022, the voicebank of Kotonoha Akane & Aoi for a voice conversion software Seiren Voice was produced by Dwango.

== Character ==
Kotonoha Akane & Aoi's character art were designed by Japanese illustrator Yoshida Yoshitsugi. They are a pair of twin sisters.

Akane is used to speaking in the Kansai dialect for she lived in Kansai region for a long time, and Aoi has standard intonation. Akane is "outgoing and cheerful" while Aoi is "calm and reliable".
