= Billboard Japan =

Japanese edition of the Billboard magazine

Billboard Japan is a sister organization of the U.S.-based music magazine Billboard. It is operated by the Japanese Osaka-based company Hanshin Contents Link (a subsidiary of Hanshin Electric Railway), holding an exclusive licence from Billboard's parent company to the Billboard brand name in Japan, and manages, among others, the website www.billboard-japan.com and several "Billboard Live"-branded music clubs located in the country.

In February 2008, Hanshin Contents Link, under licence from Billboard, launched the Billboard Japan Hot 100 music chart. As of 2025, the list of charts compiled by Billboard Japan also included an albums chart named Billboard Japan Hot Albums, physical-sales-only-based charts Top Singles Sales and Top Albums Sales, download-only-based charts Download Songs and Download Albums, an animation music chart named Hot Animation, and a chart for foreign songs named Hot Overseas, etc. In November 2025, the company launches book charts to list the best-selling books in Japan.

From 2010 to 2016, Billboard Japan holds an annual awards ceremony called the Billboard Japan Music Awards, which honors domestic and international artists who achieved the best results on Billboard Japan's music charts during the previous year.

== Charts ==
=== Singles and tracks ===
Title	Type	Positions	Description
Japan Hot 100	Physical sales + digital sales + streaming + airplay + video playback + karaoke	100	Charts for comprehensive released songs; First launched on March 3, 2008
Hot Animation	Physical sales + digital sales + streaming + airplay + video playback + karaoke	20	Charts for anime and video game music songs; First launched on December 1, 2010
Hot Overseas	Physical sales + digital sales + streaming + airplay + video playback + karaoke	20	Charts for internationally released songs by Western artists; First launched on December 9, 2013
Top Singles Sales	Physical sales	100	Chart for top-selling physical singles sales; One of the component charts of the Japan Hot 100
Download Songs	Digital sales	100	Chart for top-selling digital song sales; One of the component charts of the Japan Hot 100; Launched on October 9, 2017, after Radio Songs Chart became defunct
Streaming Songs	Streaming	100	Chart for top-streaming songs; One of the component charts of the Japan Hot 100; Launched on October 9, 2017, after Radio Songs Chart became defunct
Top User Generated Songs	Video playback	20	Chart for top-user-generated views songs from YouTube views; One of the component charts of the Japan Hot 100; Launched on December 7, 2020
Heatseekers Songs	Digital sales + streaming + airplay + video playback	20	Chart for songs from new artists that have never attained the top 20 of the Japan Hot 100.; Launched on December 7, 2020
Niconico Vocaloid Songs Top 20	Video views + video uploading + comments + likes	20	Chart for Vocaloid (Note: Also includes similar voice synthesis software like Utau, Voiceroid, CeVIO and Synthesizer V.) songs posted in video hosting service Niconico; Launched on December 7, 2022; Discontinued between the week of June 12 and September 4, 2024, due to the cyberattack on Niconico.
Global Japan Songs Excl. Japan	Digital sales + streaming	20	Chart for Japanese comprehensive released songs from territories outside Japan; Launched on September 14, 2023
Japan Songs (South Korea)	Digital sales + streaming	20	Chart for Japanese comprehensive released songs from South Korea; Launched on September 14, 2023
Japan Songs (Singapore)	Digital sales + streaming	20	Chart for Japanese comprehensive released songs from Singapore; Launched on September 14, 2023
Japan Songs (India)	Digital sales + streaming	20	Chart for Japanese comprehensive released songs from India; Launched on September 14, 2023
Japan Songs (France)	Digital sales + streaming	20	Chart for Japanese comprehensive released songs from France; Launched on September 14, 2023
Japan Songs (UK)	Digital sales + streaming	20	Chart for Japanese comprehensive released songs from the United Kingdom; Launched on September 14, 2023
Japan Songs (Thailand)	Digital sales + streaming	20	Chart for Japanese comprehensive released songs from Thailand; Launched on November 9, 2023
Japan Songs (South Africa)	Digital sales + streaming	20	Chart for Japanese comprehensive released songs from South Africa; Launched on November 9, 2023
Japan Songs (US)	Digital sales + streaming	20	Chart for Japanese comprehensive released songs from the United States; Launched on November 9, 2023
Japan Songs (Brazil)	Digital sales + streaming	20	Chart for Japanese comprehensive released songs from Brazil; Launched on November 9, 2023
Hot Shot Song	Digital sales + streaming + video playback	20	Chart for the most increased songs in Japan from the previous week; Launched on December 4, 2024
Japan Songs (Taiwan)	Digital sales + streaming	20	Chart for Japanese comprehensive released songs from Taiwan; Launched on December 5, 2024
Japan Songs (Germany)	Digital sales + streaming	20	Chart for Japanese comprehensive released songs from Germany; Launched on December 5, 2024
Japan Songs (Indonesia)	Digital sales + streaming	20	Chart for Japanese comprehensive released songs from Indonesia; Launched on March 27, 2025
Japan Songs (Malaysia)	Digital sales + streaming	20	Chart for Japanese comprehensive released songs from Malaysia; Launched on March 27, 2025

=== Albums ===
Title	Type	Positions	Description
Hot Albums	Physical sales + digital sales + streaming	100	Charts for comprehensive released albums (include extended plays); Launched on June 4, 2015, replaced from Top Albums
Top Albums Sales	Physical sales	100	Chart for top-selling physical album sales; One of the component charts of the Hot Albums
Download Albums	Digital sales	100	Chart for top-selling digital album sales; Launched on October 9, 2017; One of the component charts of the Hot Albums

=== Artists ===
Title	Positions	Description
Artist 100	100	Chart for the artists who earned points at the Japan Hot 100 and Hot Albums; Launched on December 7, 2020
Hot 100 Lyricists	100	Chart for the lyricists who earned points at the Japan Hot 100; Launched on December 7, 2020
Hot 100 Composers	100	Chart for the composers who earned points at the Japan Hot 100; Launched on December 7, 2020

=== Books ===
Title	Type	Positions	Description
Book Hot 100	Physical books + E-books + loaned books from library + social media indicator	100	Chart for best-selling books; Launched on November 6, 2025
Hot Bungei Books	Physical books + E-books + loaned books from library + social media indicator	20	Chart for best-selling literary books; Launched on November 6, 2025
Hot Manga	Physical books + E-books + loaned books from library + social media indicator	20	Chart for best-selling comic books (manga); Launched on November 6, 2025
Hot Economy Books	Physical books + E-books + loaned books from library + social media indicator	20	Chart for best-selling politics and economy-related books; Launched on November 6, 2025
Hot Culture Books	Physical books + E-books + loaned books from library + social media indicator	20	Chart for best-selling culture and art-related books; Launched on November 6, 2025
Showa Books	Physical books + E-books + loaned books from library + social media indicator	20	Chart for best-selling books first published during the Shōwa era; Launched on November 6, 2025
Heisei Books	Physical books + E-books + loaned books from library + social media indicator	20	Chart for best-selling books first published during the Heisei era; Launched on November 6, 2025
Reiwa Books	Physical books + E-books + loaned books from library + social media indicator	20	Chart for best-selling books first published during the Reiwa era; Launched on November 6, 2025
Hot Shot Books	Physical books + E-books + loaned books from library + social media indicator	20	Chart for the most increased-selling songs in Japan from the previous week; Launched on December 4, 2025

== Music Labo ==
Music Labo (ミュージック・ラボ) was a music magazine in Japan, published from 1970 to 1994. Billboard Publications bought 45% of that business to create Billboard Japan/Music Labo in 1971. The magazine published a number of record charts including the "Hot 150", the "Hot 100", and the "Hot 50". The Music Labo charts were used for the "Japan" section of "Hits of the World" in Billboard. There were Billboard and Music Labo Awards at the Tokyo Music Festival.

== See also ==
- Billboard Japan Hot 100
- Billboard Japan Music Awards
