= Sinsy =

Speech synthesis software

- Developer: Nagoya Institute of Technology
- Stable release: 0.92 / December 25, 2015; 10 years ago
- Preview release: 3.9 / 2017/12/25
- Operating system: Linux
- Available in: Japanese, English, Chinese
- Type: Vocal Synthesizer Application
- License: Modified BSD license
- Website: www.sinsy.jp

Sinsy (Singing Voice Synthesis System) (しぃんしぃ) is an online Hidden Markov model (HMM)-based singing voice synthesis system by the Nagoya Institute of Technology that was created under the Modified BSD license.

== Overview ==
The online demonstrator is free to use, but will only generate tracks up to 5 minutes. The user uploads data in the MusicXML format, which the Sinsy website reads to output a WAV file of the generated voice. Gender factor, vibrato intensity, and pitch shift can be adjusted prior to output.

As of December 25, 2015, the official developers of Sinsy were Keiichi Tokuda (Producer and designer), Keiichiro Oura (Design and Development), Kazuhiro Nakamura (Development and Main Maintainer), and Yoshihiko Nankaku.

It was originally available in Japanese and English, and Mandarin support was later added for the synthesis engine; however, the web interface still only supports Japanese and English.

In 2016, Sinsy stated using the deep learning processing technology DNN.

== Products ==
- Yoko (謡子), Japanese female vocal. She currently has two vocals for the service, both in Japanese, one being a beta and the other a fully released version.
- Xiang-Ling (香鈴), Japanese female vocal. An English vocal was added Christmas, 2015. Mandarin was added also to her language capabilities.
- Matsuo-P (松尾P), English masculine vocal
- Namine Ritsu S (波音リツS), a Japanese male vocal currently in beta. Originally produced for UTAU, it released on December 25, 2013.
- Unidentified; an unknown vocal in Japanese
- Unidentified; a second unknown vocal in Japanese
