= Voiceroid =

Speech synthesizer application

- Voiceroid 2 interface with Kizuna Akari loaded, running on Windows 10
- Developer: AH-Software
- Release: December 4, 2009; 16 years ago
- Stable release: Voiceroid2
- Operating system: Windows XP/Vista/7/8
- Available in: Japanese
- Type: Speech Synthesizer Application
- License: Proprietary
- Website: www.ah-soft.com/voiceroid/

Voiceroid is a speech synthesizer application developed by AH-Software and is designed for speech. It is only available in the Japanese language. Its name comes from the singing software Vocaloid, for which AH-Software also develops voicebanks. Both AH-Software's first Vocaloids and Voiceroids went on sale on December 4, 2009.

It differs from regular text-to-speech programs in that it gives users more control over settings like tempo, pitch, and intonation.

== Overview ==
Voiceroid uses an engine called AITalk developed by AI Inc. The user is able to adjust the tempo, pitch, and intonation to make the program sound more natural. The original two products, Tsukuyomi Shouta and Tsukuyomi Ai, were packaged with the animating software, Crazy Talk SE.

On October 22, 2010, a new version of the engine was introduced, known as Voiceroid+. The first voicebank released for this new engine featured a character from the children's anime Eagle Talon, known as Yoshida-kun. Much like Shouta and Ai, he is aimed at young audiences.

The first three Voiceroids were subject to censorship, and inappropriate words were filtered out. However, Tsurumaki Maki was designed specifically for a more mature audience and is the first of the series to have no form of censorship. Yuzuki Yukari was also the first Vocaloid to have a Voiceroid voicebank. For Tohoku Zunko's release the software was vastly improved compared to previous Voiceroid+ voices. The first two Voiceroids to come in one package are Kotonoha Akane and Aoi. In 2015, the software was upgraded to Voiceroid+ EX.

In 2017, the newest version of the software, "Voiceroid 2", was announced. This version has a number of new features and differences, though users can still import the past Voiceroid and its variants into it. However, older engine versions will not be able to use any new features.

A number of releases for the software have been produced after successful crowdfunding campaigns; since 2016, this has become the main source of funding for new voicebanks.

== List of products ==
Boxart for Voiceroid+; Tsurumaki Maki

=== Voiceroid ===
Voiceroid

- Tsukuyomi Shouta: Designed to be based on a seven-year-old male. Release date: December 4, 2009.
- Tsukuyomi Ai: Shouta's "sister" product, designed to be based on a five-year-old female. Release date: December 4, 2009.

Voiceroid+

- Yoshida-kun: Based on the character of the same name from the anime Eagle Talon. Release date: October 22, 2010.
- Tsurumaki Maki: A teenage female, voiced by Tomoe Tamiyasu. She was the first Voiceroid to not contain censorship of vulgar words. Release date: November 12, 2010. Maki has also received a speaking CeVIO AI voicebank, as well as an English and Japanese Synthesizer V voicebank, the release date of which was June 18, 2021.
- Yuzuki Yukari: An 18-year-old female, voiced by Chihiro Ishiguro. She is the first Vocaloid to also have a VOICEROID library, as well as several emotion parameters (joy, sadness and anger). Release date: December 22, 2011.
- Tohoku Zunko: A 17-year-old female, voiced by Satomi Satō. She was originally created to help promote the recovery of the Tōhoku region after the Great East Japan Earthquake of 2011. Her character design is based on zunda mochi, a Tōhoku specialty. Release date: September 28, 2012. She later received a VOCALOID3 singing voicebank in June 2014 and a n3utrino singing voicebank in July 2021.
- Kotonoha Akane and Aoi: A pair of twin sisters, voiced by Sakakibara Yui. Akane's voicebank has Kansai-ben intonation whereas Aoi's has standard intonation. They also have a singing voicebank for Synthesizer V, released on July 30, 2020. Release date: April 25, 2014.

Voiceroid + EX

- All 6 past Voiceroids except Kotonoha Akane and Aoi were upgraded.
- Minase Kou: The first new male vocal released for this version of the software. Release date: October 29, 2015.
- Kyomachi Seika: A 23-year-old female, voiced by Rika Tachibana. Her character serves as a mascot for the town of Seika, Kyoto. Release date: June 10, 2016.
- Tohoku Kiritan: An 11-year-old female, voiced by Himika Akaneya. She is the younger sister of Tohoku Zunko. The goal for her to become a VOICEROID was pitched at ¥4,500,000 to be raised by 18 May 2016. At time of closing she raised ¥6,983,080, 55% more than was required. Release date: October 27, 2016. She also has singing voicebanks available for UTAU, n3utrino and CeVIO AI.

=== Voiceroid 2 ===
- Yuzuki Yukari and the Kotonoha sisters were announced for Voiceroid 2.
- Tohoku Itako: A 19-year-old female, voiced by Ibuki Kido. She is the eldest sister of Tohoku Zunko and Tohoku Kiritan. Confirmation of her production began after a crowdfunding campaign which raised ¥10,300,000 upon closing. Release date: November 8, 2018.
- Kizuna Akari: A 15-year-old female voiced by Madoka Yonezawa, simultaneously released as a VOCALOID5 singing voicebank. Release date: December 22, 2017.
- Haruno Sora: A 17-year-old female voiced by Kikuko Inoue, simultaneously released as a VOCALOID5 singing voicebank. Release date: July 26, 2018.
- Tsuina-chan: A 14-year-old girl and a demon hunter. She was confirmed to become a Voiceroid after yet another successful crowdfunding campaign; her goal was ¥4,800,000 and she reached ¥14,052,884, a total of almost 300% more than needed. Similarly to the Kotonoha package, she has a standard Japanese voicebank and a Kansai-ben voicebank, both voiced by Mai Kadowaki. Release date: November 1, 2019.
- Iori Yuzuru: A male voicebank voiced by Yoshiyuki Matsuura, developed in collaboration with AI Inc. Release date: February 27, 2020.
- Otomachi Una: A 11-year-old female, voiced by Aimi Tanaka. Release date: December 11, 2020. She was originally released for VOCALOID4 on July 30, 2016, and later received a VOCALOID6 AI bank.

== See also ==
- Speech synthesis
- Vocaloid
- CeVIO
- UTAU
