= Kaai Yuki =

Singing voice synthesizer developed by AH-Software

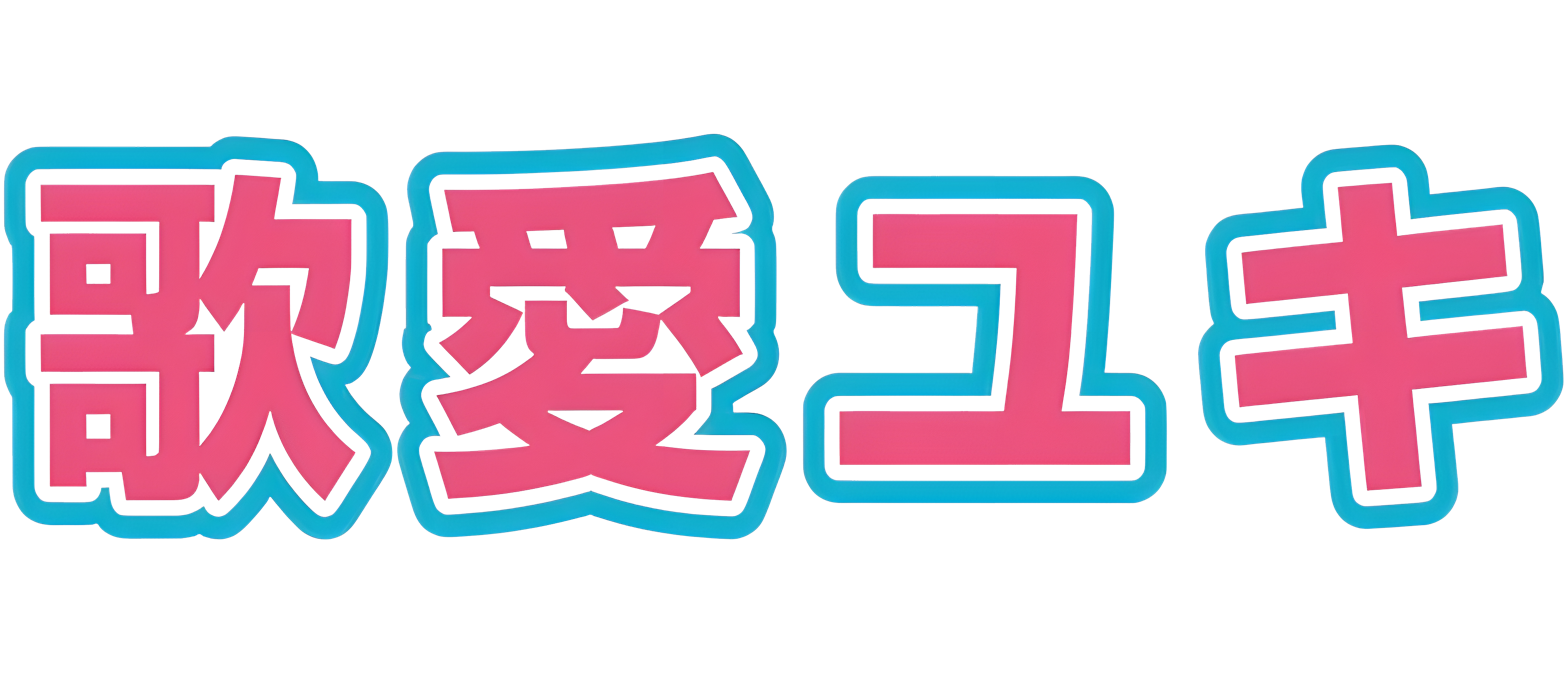

- Kaai Yuki V4
- Developer: AH-Software Co. Ltd.
- Release: December 4, 2009
- Stable release: Kaai Yuki V4 / October 29th, 2015
- Operating system: Windows, Mac
- Available in: Japanese
- Type: Vocal Synthesizer Application
- Website: homepage

Kaai Yuki (歌愛ユキ) is a child Vocaloid character produced by AH-Software Co. Ltd and released originally for Vocaloid 2.

"Vocaloid 2: Song of Kaai Yuki" is a Vocaloid voice library developed by AHS. It was released as a voice plugin for Vocaloid 2 Editor on December 4, 2009. The recommended tempo for this library is between 50 and 150 beats per minute, and the recommended range is between F2 and C4.

== Development ==
Her voice is taken from recordings of an actual elementary school student, though the student is unknown.

AH-Software also announced that they would be selling their vocals in Germany, with Yuki being destined to be the first sold there.

=== Additional software ===
Silhouettes of the AH-Software VOCALOIDs were revealed on a poster on November 6, 2014, but it was unconfirmed what they were for at the time. On November 20, it was confirmed in the livestream for Vocaloid 4 that they all, with the exception of Tohoku Zunko, would receive Vocaloid 4 updates. It was later confirmed that due to Yuki's original voice provider maturing, possible growl samples would be recorded from a new voice provider. On September 30, Yuki was confirmed to only receive a Natural voicebank, which could be purchased on its own or in a starter package. Her release date was announced to be October 29, 2015.

In an interview, Tomohide Ogata expressed a desire to produce English versions of their Vocals, however, the project is too complex. He went on to explain that because all of their providers are Japanese, they would rather seek English speakers of a similar voice to the Japanese versions from the United States and United Kingdom.

On August 23, 2016, 'Song Love Snow' is a Vocaloid voice library released as an in app purchase project for Mobile Vocaloid Editor.

== Characteristics ==
She and Hiyama Kiyoteru were released as "student" and "teacher" vocals.

Yuki is meant to be portrayed as a 9-year-old elementary school student. She is said to be "As tall as 10 big apples" and "As heavy as 86 apples". Her red randoseru is a motif of YAMAHA's wind controller, WX5.

== Popularity ==
Launched in 2009, Yuki's voice has been gaining popularity in the early 2020s thanks to songs like "Lagtrain" (ラグトレイン, Ragu Torein) and later similarly when the animated music video of "Kyoufuu All Back" (強風オールバック, Kyōfū Ōru Bakku) featuring her vocals and likeness went viral on YouTube and Niconico, topping the Billboard Japan Niconico Vocaloid Songs Top 20 chart for 13 weeks, and spawning multiple fan remakes in the form of redraws, anime music videos and song covers.

== See also ==
- List of Vocaloid products
