= Anime composer =

Composer who mainly composes music for anime productions

An anime composer is a composer who mainly composes music for anime productions.

Anime soundtracks are part of the "media mix" of anime marketing, in which a show encourages purchases of related products, such as memorabilia, games, and retail tie-ins. The careers of anime composers are accordingly shaped by different commercial pressures than other kinds of music writers.

Beginning with Astro Boy in 1963, Japanese cartoons had short theme songs. These would be expanded with a few extra verses to sell on small 45 rpm records for children. The songs themselves were typically cheerful imitations of Western music styles, with essentially anonymous composers.

Anime soundtracks became more mainstream in the 1970s. The major success of John William's score for Star Wars (1977) inspired the creators of Spaceship Battle Yamato (1974-5) to release the record Symphonic Suite Yamato (1977), composed by Hiroshi Miyagawa. It sold well, and very soon it became the industry standard for all anime TV shows to produce spin-off LP records with ten to twelve songs. Particularly notable anime music composers in the 70s include Yuji Ohno, who composed modern jazz albums for Lupin III, and Seiji Yokoyama, who composed symphonies for Dracula: Sovereign of the Damned, a feature film adapted from The Tomb of Dracula.

In the 1980s, the anime industry intersected more strongly with Japan's pop music industry. Composer Tetsuya Komuro, for example, eventually became a multimillionaire music producer for pop artists like Namie Amuro. His career began as an anime composer, with his first record being the soundtrack to Vampire Hunter D (1985). He spearheaded a trend for electronic music inspired by European dance clubs, which he composed for the influential anime series City Hunter (1987-8). Komuro's name became synonymous with a brand of catchy music, suitable for karaoke, which blurred boundaries between anime music and pop music.

Yoko Kanno composed melancholic experimental music for Cowboy Bebop (1998-9).

Evan Call has become one of the first Western anime composers to have breakthrough in the industry, composing music for multiple popular series, such as Violet Evergarden, My Happy Marriage and Frieren: Beyond Journey's End.
