= Utau =

Japanese shareware voice synthesizer

UTAU
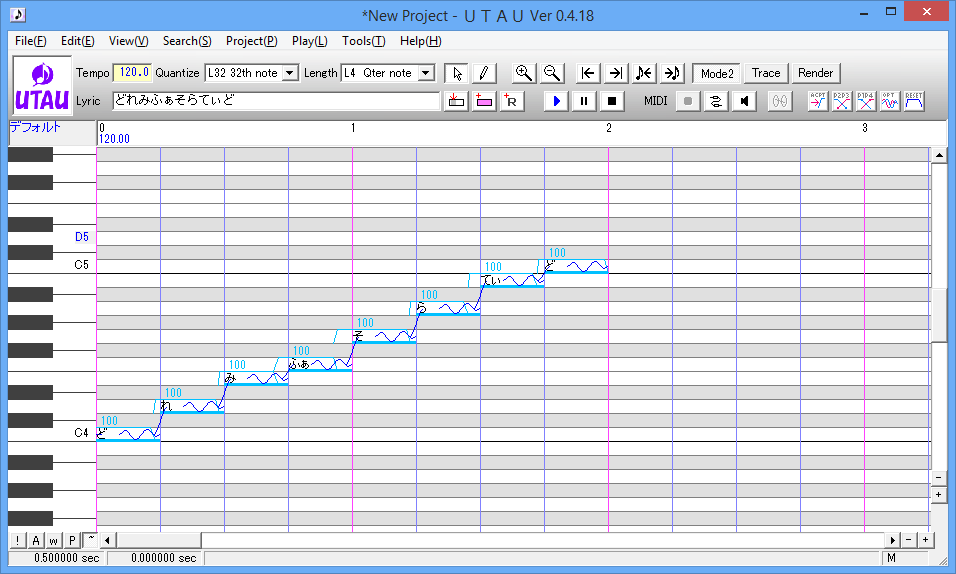
- Original author: Ameya/Ayame
- Developer: Ameya/Ayame
- Release: March 2008; 18 years ago
- Stable release: v0.4.19(c) (Windows); 1.0.0b21 (Mac) / May 24, 2024; 2 years ago
- Written in: Visual Basic 6.0
- Operating system: Windows 2000 / XP / Vista / 7 / 8 / 10 / 11; Mac OS X
- Platform: Windows, Mac OS X
- Available in: Japanese and English (and other languages via patch files)
- Type: Musical Synthesizer Application (Music sequencer)
- License: Shareware (by donations)
- Website: utau2008.xrea.jp utau-synth.com

UTAU is a Japanese singing synthesizer application created by Ameya/Ayame (飴屋/菖蒲). This program is similar to the Vocaloid software, with the difference being it is shareware instead of under a third party licensing.

== Overview ==
In April 2008, Ameya/Ayame released UTAU, a free, advanced support tool shareware software that was downloadable from its main website. UTAU (歌う), literally meaning 'to sing' in Japanese, has its origin in the activity of "Jinriki Bōkaroido" (人力ボーカロイド; Manual Vocaloid), where people edit an existing vocal track, extract phonemes, adjust pitch, and reassemble them to create a Vocaloid-esque singing voice. UTAU was originally created to assist this process using concatenative synthesis. UTAU is able to use WAV files provided by the user, so that a singing voice can be synthesized by introducing song lyrics and melody. UTAU came with AQUEST's voice synthesizer "AquesTalk" for synthesizing the voice samples of the default voicebank, Utane Uta (also nicknamed Defoko, meaning 'Default Girl' in Japanese) on its initial launch, after which the generator deletes itself. Voices made for the UTAU program are officially called "UTAU" as well, though they are colloquially known as "UTAUloids", a reference to VOCALOID. They are also called "voicebanks" (more common in English-speaking areas) and "(voice) libraries" in Japan. A myriad of voicebanks have been developed by independent users. These voicebanks are normally distributed directly from their creators via internet download, but some are sold as part of commercial projects.

UTAU is mostly a Japanese program and thus many of its voices are created specifically for the Japanese language. However, as users are able to make their own voicebanks, the userbase has devised methods to allow voicebanks to sing in languages other than Japanese. The X-SAMPA format is often used for Italian or other non-Japanese voicebanks, however other phonetic systems are sometimes used, such as ARPABET and any number of custom phonetic systems.

UTAU's project files are saved under the ".ust" (Utau Sequence Text) extension. These files can be freely distributed, allowing different UTAU to sing the same piece. Producers have developed several methods of producing their sound banks and results for the voicebanks vary because of this. UTAU does not support MIDI format or .vsq format.

Ameya/Ayame added support for Unicode in an unreleased newer version of UTAU as per the screenshots posted on Twitter. The corresponding backend support tail fixed region as well as several other audio encodings has already been released, while frontend support is yet to be released as of September 2022. Ameya also updated UTAU to be compatible with 64-bit systems.

== Configuration ==
The editor is capable of placing notes, entering phonemes, and changing pitch and volume on a piano roll. Only one track can be created in UTAU, and notes cannot be placed on top of each other. Because a human cannot say two different things at the same time, this is also true for a Utauloid. By default, only notes are displayed on the piano roll, but display settings can be changed to show the pitch curve, volume intensity, envelope, and flags. UTAU uses flags to change aspects of the voice, such as with low-pass and high-pass filters, and reducing or adding breathiness. These flags differ depending on the resampler used. Score information and data in the voicebank is processed with a resampler and wavtool based on the score created with the editor. Only one resampler can be utilized in a single .ust file. A formant filter is used to control changes in voice quality, which can be turned off.

The audio file to be loaded in is found by matching the symbols on the note with the audio file name in the voice library. However, a prefix.map file can change which subfolder the sample is taken from. The pitch of the synthesized voice is adjusted according to the difference between the original sound file and the pitch of the note in the editor. UTAU uses formant filters to prevent extreme changes in voice quality, which can be disabled. Batch processing is used to generate multiple notes at once. Cache files are created during this process. Depending on the resampler, the amount of cache files may increase. There are settings in the menu to delete cache files when the program is closed, or after a certain period of time.

There are built-in plugins which can automatically merge vowels, and the "Omakase/A la carte" settings which can add automatic pitch and vibrato to an entire file. Other plugins created by users can also be added into the software. The colors of the editor can also be changed in the setting.ini file.

=== Voices ===
As mentioned above, WAV files can be ported into UTAU. There can be hundreds, or in some cases, thousands, of these files in a single voicebank. Voices are installed by either placing them in the "voice" folder or dragging and dropping them onto the UTAU icon. These libraries also come with an oto.ini file which determines the timing and configuration of each sample. When outputting audio from the score data in the editor, the program uses the oto.ini to set timing and pronunciation. Oto.ini files can be created using UTAU's GUI, or in third-party software made by users, the most notable of these third party programs being SetParam. Frequency tables (.frq files) are used to process the waveform when changing the pitch in the editor. Some resamplers use other file types instead of .frq. The voices may also come with image files most commonly being the .bmp format and standalone voice dialogues as some Vocaloids do. They also often include readme files which contain software information and terms of use. Character information files, commonly seen as character.txt, are also often included, which hold information that can be viewed in the "Voice preview" section of the GUI which labels the voicebank author, the name, a sample file to be played on click of the "sample" button, and the Voicebank image. It can also contain other parameters specified by the creator, such as "genre".

Some voicebanks are monosyllabic, collectively referred to as "CV" (consonant-vowel), whereas others use triphones to produce a smoother sound. These triphonetic voicebanks are collectively referred to as "VCV" (vowel-consonant-vowel). These take considerably more time and effort to make (being about seven times the size of a CV voicebank, in terms of lines in the oto.ini file), but produce a more natural result.

Later UTAU voices would include phonemes composed of vowels+consonants (VC) to accommodate languages other than Japanese. Methods that employ this include "CVVC" (in which a VC phoneme is placed between two CV phonemes), or a sister method "VCCV", which is based on CVVC, but contains a few differences (differentiation between aspirated and unaspirated VCs, consonant cluster support, etc.). "VCCV" is named the way it is to differentiate itself from its creator's past CVVC lists. Two rarer voice recording methods are CVC, where one phoneme consists of a consonant-vowel-consonant and is split up in the program by using the oto.ini, and a method called rentan-jutsu (れんたんじゅつ), in which a series of CV syllables are recorded in multiple wav files in order to create a smoother result without resorting to full VCV.

Since the audio files are independent files, they can be used in other software such as a DAW.

== Uta Utane (Defoko) ==
Uta Utane (デフォ子) (Defoko) Is the default preinstalled voicebank of the UTAU software. Uta Utane's name is derived from the softwares name "UTAU". She is commonly referred to as Defoko, which is a portamento of the words default and -ko, a common Japanese suffix meaning girl or child. In contrast from most other voicebanks used in the UTAU Uta Utane does not feature a real vocal provider. Uta Utane's voice is provided by the Japanese software company Aquest. Utane's voice samples were provided from Aquest's AquesTalk software. Uta Utane is often found under the preset "Default-Female1" in the UTAU software.

== Development ==
The development of UTAU started when Ameya began to use Audacity to recombine samples of other singers, and Melodyne to pitch correct the samples and set them to music. The act of doing this was referred to as "human-powered VOCALOID". LOLI.COM, a musician who posted his own rap music to Nico Nico Douga, used his own voice for human-powered Vocaloid and released an audio editing software which could help users do the same. Since the process of doing "human-powered VOCALOID" by hand took a substantial amount of time and effort, Ameya began to develop a new tool which would aid the process.

The tool was announced on Nico Nico Douga on 11 January 2008. At that time, it was possible to adjust the timing of the sound, change the envelope of a note, and generate batch files. On 5 February 2008, a video was released showing the GUI. Here, it was possible to time stretch samples, create oto.ini files, and adjust the pitch bends of notes. On 5 March 2008, a video explaining the program's specifications was released on Nico Nico Douga, and on 15 March 2008, the tool was renamed UTAU.

The creator was a programmer by trade and not a specialist in vocal synthesis, but used previous knowledge to create UTAU. After its release, Ameya continued to improve UTAU, and started developing it in collaboration with other text-to-speech developers.

In June 2008, Ameya rejected the label of "Jinriki Bōkaroido" (人力ボーカロイド; Manual Vocaloid) for UTAU, calling it singing voice synthesis software instead.

A Mac version called UTAU-Synth was released in 2011.

== Audio files and copyright ==
Since UTAU can create a singing voice using any WAV files, it is possible to take the voice of an existing person and use it as data. Often, actors, singers, and celebrities will have clips of their voices re-purposed for use in UTAU. The creator, Ameya, once created a voice using data from a voice actor's CD.

In May 2008, Ameya decided to stop using audio data without permission for the time being, unless the voice actor allowed it.

== Cultural impact ==
Music video for "Dance Delightful" by Jamie Paige, showcasing the UTAU voicebank Adachi Rei, created by combining sine waves through additive synthesis

Though the software is very popular in Japan, its origins and cultural impact are owed to the already established popularity of the Vocaloid software. UTAU itself was first made famous when the creator of Kasane Teto released the character, posing as a real Vocaloid as part of an April Fool's joke in 2008. The influence of the Vocaloid software also led to both programs commonly being used side by side. Often popular UTAU mascots like Kasane Teto appear in VOCALOID-based media such as Maker Hikōshiki Hatsune Mix or Hatsune Miku: Project DIVA.

Later, the UTAU software would have its own impact on Vocaloid and other vocal synthesizers, with a number of vocals either referencing UTAU or being produced for the engine to begin with. For example, Megurine Luka V4x was influenced by the UTAU vocal Gahata Meiji. Wataru Sasaki, planning and development producer from Crypton Future Media, also spoke to someone very familiar with UTAU and said that the conversation was "very interesting". Macne Nana of the Macne series later would become both a UTAU voice and a Vocaloid voice. The voice provider of English Vocaloid Ruby, Misha, had previously produced a Japanese-language UTAU named Makune Hachi (MAKU音ハチ). In addition, the vocalist for Dex, Kenji-B, created Kenji Baionoto (倍音音ケンジ) for UTAU, and AkiGlancy, the vocalist behind Dex's partner Daina, gave her voice to the UTAU Namida (ナミダ). Kikuko Inoue, the voice actress of Macne Coco White and Black (Mac音ココ白・黒) (see Macne series) went on to voice a Vocaloid5 product by the name of Haruno Sora (桜乃そら). The product came with two voicebanks, Natural and Cool. After the release of Vocaloid 3 vocal Tohoku Zunko, her two sisters Tohoku Itako and Tohoku Kiritan received UTAU vocals. Kiritan would later hold a crowdfunding campaign for her to become a Voiceroid. As well as its influence on Vocaloid, UTAU has served as a development launchpad for other commercial singing voice synthesizers. The most notable of these is Dreamtonics' Synthesizer V, which sprung from the development of the UTAU resampler known as Moresampler, both of which were developed by Kanru Hua.

Its main attraction is not only based on it being freely distributed on the internet, but because it allowed a user to insert their own voice into the database for use for music, opening the doors for users to further develop their own music. UTAU owes its growing popularity to its ability to provide a free method of creating voices for music use and has established numerous music producers working with the software on sites such as Niconico and YouTube. Users also see it as an alternative to the Vocaloid software, which offers a more limited supply of voices at a high price and may not offer the voice types they are seeking for their music, as the large database of voices often have a much greater chance of offering the voice they seek. However, despite the number of voicebanks offered, the software has overall far fewer producers working with it than Vocaloid.

A radio station set up a 1-hour program containing nothing but Vocaloid and UTAU-based music.

In addition, an event called The UTAU M@STER was held regularly from 19 July 2012 onwards. The event was the main gathering of groups or circles and was held in a similar fashion to the Vocaloid-related event, THE VOC@LOID M@STER, which had existed since 2007.

=== Related software ===
Unlike Vocaloid, UTAU files are not restrictive as it is not a proprietary based license. Therefore, it is possible to use open-source license products with the UTAU software, such as those produced for the Macne series (Mac音シリーズ), released for the programs Reason 4 and GarageBand. These products were sold by Act2 and by converting their file format, were able to also work with the UTAU program. Later, the Macne packages Whisper☆Angel Sasayaki, Macne Nana 2S and Macne Petit 2S came with pre-built UTAU voicebanks.

The default voicebank "Defoko" (Utane Uta) borrows her voice from the software AquesTalk, specifically the voice "AquesTalk Female-1" produced by A-quest. Permission had been granted for her free distribution with the software. Utane Koe, Uta's sister, also borrows her voice from the AquesTalk software. Namine Ritsu (波音リツ), a voicebank originally built for UTAU, was also later added to another piece of software called Sinsy as "Namine Ritsu S". Another voicebank originally developed for the UTAU software, Yamine Renri (闇音レンリ), was also later added to Synthesizer V. The popular UTAU character Kasane Teto was released as a Synthesizer V AI voice database on 27 April 2023.

Due to the software's own copyright agreement, non-open license software such as VOCALOID are not permitted to be imported into the UTAU software. A number of plug-ins for the software have also been developed by users of the software which add and enhance the vocals of the software. The software program Sugarcape, based on the same freeware intention as UTAU, has already entered beta stage. There was an official Mac version of UTAU released on 27 May 2011, named UTAU-Synth. It has approximately the same features as the Windows version. UTAU-Synth version can import both voices and songs made with the Windows version, but its project files and voicebank configurations are not fully compatible with the Windows version. In late 2017 it was mentioned that Plogue Art et Technologie, Inc. had a working redirect adaptation that would make UTAU vocals appear in its engine Alter/Ego.

Editing MIDI file in OpenUtau

OpenUtau is a modern, unofficial open-source implementation of most features present in Utau, developed by the Vocaloid producer StAkira, with a beta released in November 2021. It is available in Windows, MacOS, and Linux. The software was designed to be compatible with Utau but with a modern user experience, and more features were added over the time. Unlike Utau, it does not require a Japanese system locale to function properly.

=== Usage in music ===
The first ever UTAU original song to be released was "Kenka Wakare" (Japanese:"けんか別れ"; English: "Fighting and Breaking up") by nwp8861, who was also responsible for "Song of the Eared Robot" sung by Kasane Teto. The song Kenka Wakare was released on Nico Nico Douga on May 10th, 2008 featuring the voicebank Utane Uta; a revised version was released three days later on May 13th, 2008.

The licensed songs from the album Graduation from Lie, featuring Kasane Teto, were released for music downloads from Karen-T, under Crypton Future Media, as a special release. This is the first licensed release of any UTAU.

The voice library Momo Momone is used in the viral YouTube video "Nyan Cat". It is a cover of "Nyanyanyanyanyanyanya!", a song originally composed by daniwellP and using the VOCALOID Hatsune Miku.

== See also ==
- Cevio
- Dōjin music
- Speech synthesis
