= CeVIO =

Japanese voice synthesis software

CeVIO Creative Studio CeVIO AI
- CeVIO AI 9 singing interface on Windows 10, with Sato Sasara loaded
- Developer: CeVIO Team
- Release: Free version: April 26, 2013 (speech), June 2013 (singing); Full version: September 26, 2013
- Stable release: 9.1.19.0 / December 10, 2025; 11 months ago
- Operating system: Windows 8.1 and later (64bit)
- Available in: Japanese
- Type: Voice synthesizer
- License: Proprietary
- Website: cevio.jp

CeVIO is the collective name of a range of computer software projects, including CeVIO Vision (digital signage), CeVIO Creative Studio (concatenative sampling–based vocal synthesis), and CeVIO AI (machine learning–based vocal synthesis). CeVIO was made to assist in the creation of user-generated content. It can produce both speech, from typed text, and singing, from notes and lyrics.

== Overview ==
CeVIO is audio creation software for speech and singing vocal synthesis.

The speech part of the software uses a large Japanese word dictionary. The first speaking voices were Sato Sasara, Suzuki Tsudumi and Takahashi.

Users can also edit the voice by hand, and each character has several voice styles to choose from. CeVIO was built using HTS, an HMM-based speech synthesis system.

HTS is also used in other voice synthesizers, such as Sinsy and Open JTalk.

The software was initially released as "CeVIO Creative Studio FREE" with Sato Sasara as the only voice. Users could create tracks, add lyrics, and add breaths at the end of notes, but these sometimes clashed with breaths the software had already added automatically.

Any other changes had to be made in other software, and even then the moves between her vowels could sound choppy. After "CeVIO Creative Studio S" came out on November 14, 2014, the FREE version was replaced by a one-month free trial of the full version. The free version stopped being available after November 19, 2014.

The full version added a tool called Fine-Tune Amplitude Timing, which lets users smooth out the choppiness. It can also change pitch, pitch bends, vibrato, vibrato timing, volume and dynamics. A "gender factor" setting makes the voice sound younger or more mature.

Like the free version, the full version can import MIDI and MusicXML files.

== Products ==
The letters in brackets show which software each voice is available for: Free = CeVIO Creative Studio FREE, CCS = CeVIO Creative Studio, AI = CeVIO AI, CP = CeVIO Pro, VS = VoiSona.

=== CeVIO Project ===
- Sato Sasara (さとうささら) (Free, CCS, AI, VS) is a female voice that can speak and sing.
- Suzuki Tsudumi (すずきつづみ) (CCS, AI) is a female voice that can speak and sing.
- Takahashi (タカハシ) (CCS) is a male voice that can only speak.

=== 1st Place ===
- One (オネ) (CCS, AI) is a female voice that can speak and sing. She is the second voice in the "Aria on the Planetes" project, after the Vocaloid voice IA. She was released on January 27, 2015, with a speaking voicebank only. A singing voicebank was later released on May 22, 2015.
- IA (イア) (CCS, AI) is a female voice that can speak and sing. She was first released for Vocaloid 3 as part of the "Aria on the Planetes" project. A talking CeVIO vocal was released in March 2017, named "IA Talk – Aria on the Planetes". On June 29, 2018, IA English C was released, featuring a Power and Natural bank.

=== XING Inc. ===
- Akasaki Minato (赤咲湊) (CCS) is a male voice that can only sing. He is the first member of the "Color Voice Series", a series of singing-only voicebanks by XING Inc. He is illustrated as a 25-year-old man representing the color red. He was released alongside Midorizaki Kasumi on February 19, 2015. His mascot is the only one in the Color Voice Series to have an alternative version depicted in the official illustration. The vocal is a counterpart to Kizaki Airi.
- Midorizaki Kasumi (緑咲香澄) (CCS) is a female voice that can only sing. She is the second member of the series. She is illustrated as a 27-year-old woman representing the color green. She was released alongside Akasaki Minato on February 19, 2015. The vocal is a counterpart to Shirosaki Yuudai.
- Ginsaki Yamato (銀咲大和) (CCS) is a male vocal for CeVIO Creative Studio only capable of singing. He is the third member of the series. He is illustrated as a 50-year-old man representing the color silver. He was released alongside Kinzaki Koharu on March 19, 2015. The vocal is a counterpart to Kinzaki Koharu.
- Kinzaki Koharu (金咲小春) (CCS) is a female vocal for CeVIO Creative Studio only capable of singing. She is the fourth member of the series. She is illustrated as a 52-year-old woman representing the color gold. She was released alongside Ginsaki Yamato on March 19, 2015. The vocal is a counterpart to Ginsaki Yamato.
- Shirosaki Yuudai (白咲優大) (CCS) is a male vocal for CeVIO Creative Studio only capable of singing. He is the fifth member of the series. He is illustrated as a 20-year-old man representing the color white. He was released alongside Kizaki Airi on April 23, 2015. The vocal is a counterpart to Midorizaki Kasumi.
- Kizaki Airi (黄咲愛里) (CCS) is a female vocal for CeVIO Creative Studio only capable of singing. She is the sixth member of the series. She is illustrated as an 18-year-old woman representing the color yellow. She was released alongside Shirosaki Yuudai on April 23, 2015. The vocal is a counterpart to Akasaki Minato.

=== Teichiku Records ===
- HAL-O-ROID (ハルオロイド・ミナミ) (CCS) is a male vocal for CeVIO Creative Studio only capable of singing. He is a free vocal for the software with the voice of deceased Enka singer Haruo Minami.

=== Kamitsubaki Studio ===
- Kafu (可不) (AI) is a female voice that can only sing. She is the first member of a series of singing voicebanks by Kamitsubaki Studio. She is described as a "musical isotope" of singer and VTuber Kaf. Kafu was released on July 7, 2021.
- Sekai (星界) (AI) is a female voice that can only sing. She is the second member of the series. She is described as a "musical isotope" of virtual singer Isekaijoucho. Sekai was released on April 29, 2022.
- Rime (裏命) (AI) is a female voice that can only sing. She is the third member of the series. She is described as a "musical isotope" of virtual singer RIM. Rime was released on October 25, 2022.
- Coko (狐子) (AI) is a female voice that can only sing. She is the fourth member of the series. She is described as a "musical isotope" of virtual singer KOKO. Coko was released on January 25, 2023.
- Haru (羽累) (AI) is a female voice that can only sing. She is the fifth member of the series. She is described as a "musical isotope" of virtual rapper/singer Harusaruhi. Haru was released on November 13, 2023.

=== Kizuna AI ===
- #kzn (AI, VS) is a female voice that can only sing. She is based on the VTuber Kizuna AI, and was announced on February 25, 2022. It had 24-hour limited pre-sales on several dates, but as of January 2023, no official release date had been announced.

=== Bushiroad ===
- Popy (AI) is a female voice that can only sing. She is one of two voices created as part of a collaboration between the BanG Dream! franchise and CeVIO. Popy is based on the character Kasumi Toyama, vocalist of BanG Dream! band Poppin'Party. Her voice data comes from earlier Poppin'Party songs. Her voice is provided by Kasumi's voice actress Aimi. Popy was released on December 21, 2022.
- Rose (AI) is a female voice that can only sing. She is the second vocal created for the BanG Dream! x CeVIO project. She is based on the character Yukina Minato, vocalist of Roselia, and her voice data comes from earlier Roselia songs. Her voice is provided by Yukina's voice actress Aina Aiba. Rose was released on December 21, 2022.

=== SSS ===
- Tohoku Kiritan (東北きりたん) (AI) is a female voice that can only sing.
- Tohoku Itako (東北イタコ) (AI) is a female voice that can only sing.
- Tohoku Zunko (東北ずん子) (AI) is a female voice that can only sing.

=== Vocalomakets ===
- Yuzuki Yukari (結月ゆかり) (AI, VS) is a female voice that can only sing.

=== Tokyo6 Entertainment ===
- Koharu Rikka（小春六花）(AI) is a female voice that can only speak. Her voice is provided by Yoshino Aoyama.
- Natsuki Karin（夏色花梨）(AI) is a female voice that can only speak. Her voice is provided by Miyu Takagi.
- Hanakuma Chihuyu（花隈千冬）(AI) is a female voice that can only speak. Her voice is provided by Kaya Okuno.

=== INCS toenter ===
- Ci flower (AI) is a female voice that can only sing.

=== AH-Software ===
- Tsurumaki Maki（弦巻マキ）(AI) is a female voice that can only speak.

=== Zan-Shin ===
- ROSA (ロサ) (AI) is a female voice that can only speak. Her character is the younger sister of the Vocaloid character CUL.

=== U-Stella ===
- FEE-Chan (CCD-0500, フィーちゃん) (AI) is a female voice that can only speak. She was developed by U-Stella in collaboration with Techno-Speech.
- UNI-Chan (CCD-0001, ユニちゃん) (AI) is a female voice announced by U-Stella, developed with Techno-Speech.

=== Gasoline Alley ===
- Futaba Minato (双葉湊音) (AI, VS) is a female voice that can only sing. She has a young girl's voice. Her voice is provided by Sachika Misawa. She was released on December 2, 2022.

=== candy cream algorithm ===
- Kanato Mell (奏兎める) (AI) is a female voice that can only sing.

=== Sony Music Entertainment Japan ===
- ANИA (ANNA) (AI) is a singing-only voice announced for CeVIO AI. She is developed by Sony Music Entertainment Japan in collaboration with Techno-Speech.

=== Bandai Namco Entertainment ===
- Reml (Rimuru, りむる) (AI) is a female singing-only voice announced for CeVIO AI.

=== Techno-Speech ===
- Chis-A (知声) (CP, VS) is a female voice that can only sing.
- Kirune (機流⾳) (VS) is a male voice that can only sing.
- Aisuu (あいす) (VS) is a female voice that can only sing.
- MYK-IV(VS) is a male voice that can only sing.
- Tanaka San (田中傘) (VS) is a female voice that can only speak.

=== NORIPRO ===
- Tamaki (玉姫) (VS) is a female vocal for VoiSona capable of singing and speech. Her voice comes from the VTuber Inuyama Tamaki.

=== Unreleased ===
- ALYS (CCS) was developed by VoxWave. After plans for a Vocaloid version of ALYS failed, VoxWave tried to make French and Japanese voices for CeVIO Creative Studio. These were never released for CeVIO, and were later released for Plogue's Alter/Ego instead.
- Chinese Female Vocal (CCS, AI) was produced by Techno-Speech. In 2018, Techno-Speech published an article comparing its old technology with its new AI technology, using samples in Japanese (Sato Sasara), English (IA) and Chinese. The Chinese sample used a new voice that had not been shown before. Nothing more has been announced about her since.
- Yuri (CCS) and Miroid (CCS) are female vocals for CeVIO Creative Studio capable only of singing used in the "Copy & Loid" game.
- 2023 Female Talk Voice (AI) was first heard on June 2, 2023, in an article by Techno-Speech about its new vocoder. One of the short demos in the article used a speaking female voice that had not been shown before.

=== Miscellaneous ===
- Yoko (謡子) and Yokun (谣君) (CCS) are a female and male pair of voices. They were included in Kawai's music notation software Score Maker.

== Reception ==
CeVIO won the Microsoft Innovation Award in 2013. It also won a prize at the 2013 CEDEC Awards. By then, it had been downloaded 300,000 times.
