= Tohoku Zunko =

Fictional character

- Official illustration of the Tohoku family. From left to right: Zunko, Itako, Kiritan, Zundamon.
- Developer: AH-Software Co. Ltd.
- Release: September 28, 2012
- Stable release: Vocaloid 4 / October 26, 2016
- Operating system: Windows
- Platform: PC
- Available in: Japanese
- Type: Vocal Synthesizer Application
- License: Proprietary
- Website: Official Website

Tohoku Zunko (東北ずん子, Tōhoku Zunko) is a character created for Voiceroid and was later also developed for the Vocaloid 3 engine.

== Development ==
She was originally created to help promote the recovery of the Tōhoku region in the wake of the 2011 Tōhoku earthquake and tsunami. Zunko's release marked an improvement compared to previous Voiceroid models, notably in the user interface. The ability to adjust strength of intonation has been added, as well as the ability to insert pauses directly into the tuning screen. Users can also directly use ruby pronunciation markers in the text. It also reads text at up to 4x speed and can output 22.1 kHz sample-rate audio files.

== Additional software ==
A fundraising campaign was in effect with the goal of creating a Vocaloid vocal for Zunko if the required funds (¥5,000,000) were met by July 20. Since then, the campaign was successful and her vocal was released in June 2014 for Vocaloid 3.

Her Voiceroid software was updated in 2015 to Voiceroid+ ex along with 5 other Voiceroid products.

== Characteristics ==
Her character design is based on a zunda-mochi, a Tōhoku specialty, which is a traditional sweet made of green soybean paste. She has two sisters Itako (older) and Kiritan (younger) who were both developed for UTAU, as well as a pet named Zundamon.

== Other media ==
Satomi Satō, who provided the voice of Tohoku Zunko, published an original novel about the character which has been serialized on Twitter since June 2012. It was published in Japan in Summer 2013 by PHP Institute Inc.

An anime Zunda Horizon story based on Tohoku Zunko was announced in June 2016. It was produced by SSS LLC, Studio Live, WAO World and Take-Y and directed by Hiroshi Takeuchi, with scripts by Michiko Yokote. Shoji Murahama is serving as producer and Hiroshi Kōjina is the key Advisor.

== See also ==
- List of Vocaloid products
