= Synthesizer V =

Singing voice synthesis software

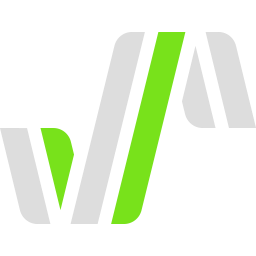

- Screenshots of Synthesizer V
- Original author: Kanru Hua
- Developers: Dreamtonics Co., Ltd.
- Release: 19 August 2018 (Beta); 23 December 2018 (Synthesizer V); January 2020 (web version); July 2020 (Synthesizer V Studio); 21 March 2025 (Synthesizer V Studio 2)
- Stable release: 2.2.1 / March 2, 2026; 7 months ago
- Written in: JavaScript, Lua
- Operating system: Microsoft Windows (Both), macOS (Both), Linux (Synthesizer V Studio)
- Platform: PC
- Available in: Interface: English, French, German, Japanese, Korean, Portuguese, Spanish, Russian, Simplified Chinese, Traditional Chinese, Vietnamese; Singing synthesis: English, Japanese, Cantonese, Mandarin, Spanish, Korean Beta: French, German, Brazilian Portuguese , Italian
- Type: Voice synthesizer
- License: Proprietary
- Website: dreamtonics.com/synthesizerv/
- "People Posture Play Pretend" by Jamie Paige, showcasing the Synthesizer V voice bank ANRI.

Synthesizer V (also known as Synth V or SV) is a singing voice synthesizer software product developed by Dreamtonics Co., Ltd.

== Overview ==
Synthesizer V Studio's singing synthesis combines concatenative synthesis and neural network based singing voice synthesis. Synthesizer V Studio is available in various free and paid versions, named "Synthesizer V Studio Basic" and "Synthesizer V Studio Pro" respectively. Some Singer Libraries are available as a demo, as a "Lite" version or "Feature Limited Trial" (FLT), but some functionalities are restricted. FLT libraries are more heavily restricted than Lite libraries.

== History ==
Synthesizer V sprung from the development of the UTAU resampler known as Moresampler, both of which were developed by Kanru Hua. It was released on Beta version on 19 August 2018, and released Synthesizer V, first generation editor on 23 December. In January 2020, the web version, which functionality is restricted was launched. In July 2020, Synthesizer V Studio, the second generation Synthesizer V editor was released. In December 2020, Synthesizer V Studio introduced AI engine, rapping vocals and cross-lingual singing synthesis (English, Japanese, Mandarin Chinese, Cantonese Chinese and Spanish, with Korean later introduced in Synth V Studio 2) are supported by later upgrade. On 21 March 2025, Synthesizer V Studio 2 (SV2) was released, improved synthesis quality and processing speed, and added new and improved functions.
