= Department of Environment, Forest, Science and Technology (Andhra Pradesh) =

Minister of Environment, Forest, Science and Technology
- Paryāvaraṇaṁ, Aṭavī mariyu Śāstra Sāṅkētika Śākha Mantrī
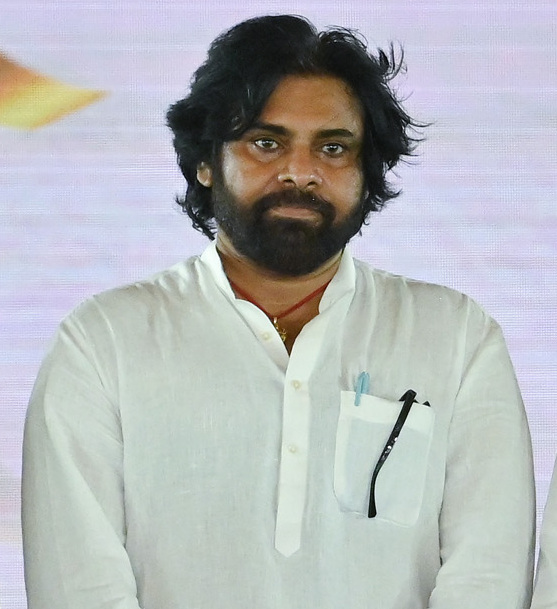
- Incumbent; Pawan Kalyan since 12 June 2024
- Department of Environment, Forest, Science and Technology
- Member of: Andha Pradesh Cabinet
- Reports to: Governor of Andhra Pradesh; Chief Minister of Andhra Pradesh; Andhra Pradesh Legislature
- Appointer: Governor of Andhra Pradesh; on the advice of the chief minister of Andhra Pradesh
- Inaugural holder: Bojjala Gopala Krishna Reddy
- Formation: 8 June 2014
- Website: Official website

The Minister of Environment, Science and Technology and Forest Minister, officially Minister of Environment, Forest, Science and Technology, is the head of the Departments of Environment, Forest, Science and Technology of the Government of Andhra Pradesh.

From June 2014 to May 2019, following the bifurcation of United Andhra Pradesh into the present-day residual Andhra Pradesh and Telangana, the Forest Minister of Andhra Pradesh was Bojjala Gopala Krishna Reddy of the Telugu Desam Party. Following the cabinet formation on 12 June 2024, Pawan Kalyan assumed the office under the Chief Ministership of N. Chandrababu Naidu.

== List of ministers ==
#	Portrait	Minister (Lifespan) Constituency	Term of office			Election (Term)	Party	Ministry	Chief Minister	Ref.
#	Portrait	Minister (Lifespan) Constituency	Term start	Term end	Duration	Election (Term)	Party	Ministry	Chief Minister	Ref.
1		Bojjala Gopala Krishna Reddy (1949–2022); MLA for Srikalahasti	8 June 2014	1 April 2017	2 years, 297 days	2014 (14th)	Telugu Desam Party	Naidu III	N. Chandrababu Naidu	
2		Sidda Raghava Rao (born 1957); MLA for Darsi	2 April 2017	29 May 2019	2 years, 57 days	2014 (14th)	Telugu Desam Party	Naidu III	N. Chandrababu Naidu	
3		Balineni Srinivasa Reddy (born 1964); MLA for Ongole	30 May 2019	7 April 2022	2 years, 312 days	2019 (15th)	YSR Congress Party	Jagan	Y. S. Jagan Mohan Reddy	
4		Peddireddy Ramachandra Reddy (born 1952); MLA for Punganur	11 April 2022	11 June 2024	2 years, 61 days	2019 (15th)	YSR Congress Party	Jagan	Y. S. Jagan Mohan Reddy	
5		Pawan Kalyan (born 1971); MLA for Pithapuram	12 June 2024	Incumbent	2 years, 112 days	2024 (16th)	Janasena Party	Naidu IV	N. Chandrababu Naidu	
