= Venkatachalam Palli =

Venkatachalam Palli (also referred to as Venkatachalampalli) is a village in the Darsi Mandal of the Prakasam district located in the southern state of Andhra Pradesh, India. In Venkatachalam Palli, the villagers speak mainly Telugu. Venkatachalam Palli is sparsely populated, with a population of 877.

The four adjoining villages of Venkatachalam Palli are Mundlamuru, Nuzendla, Kurichedu, and Polidi.

The administration follows a Panchayat system. In MPTC, it has five villages; the others are Chalivendra, Nadimpalli, Abbaya Palem and Thanam Chinthala. The current Sarpanch (elected head of a village self-government) of this village is ankala srinu and its MPTC is Ananthu Krishnaiah. Famous places in Venkatachalam Palli include the Lord Venkateswara Temple, the Kasinayana Ashram, the Ganga Mata Temple, Lord Hanuman Temple, Goddess Poleramma and the Kanaka Durga Temple.
