= Sidda Raghava Rao =

Indian politician (born 1957)

Minister of Environment, Forest, Science and Technology, Government of Andhra Pradesh
- In office 2 April 2017 – 29 May 2019
- Preceded by: Bojjala Gopala Krishna Reddy
- Succeeded by: Balineni Srinivasa Reddy

Minister of Transport, Government of Andhra Pradesh
- In office 8 June 2014 – 1 April 2017
- Preceded by: Office established
- Succeeded by: Kinjarapu Atchannaidu

Member of Legislative Assembly, Andhra Pradesh
- In office 2014–2019
- Preceded by: Buchepalli Siva Prasad Reddy
- Succeeded by: Maddisetty Venugopal
- Constituency: Darsi

Personal details
- Born: 10 August 1957 (age 69) Chimakurthy, Prakasam district, Andhra Pradesh, India
- Other political affiliations: YSR Congress Party (2020 to 2024); Telugu Desam Party (until 2020)

Sidda Raghava Rao (born 10 August 1957) is a politician from the Indian state of Andhra Pradesh, who served as the Minister for Environment, Forests, Science and Technology in the Third N. Chandrababu Naidu ministry. He represented the Darsi Assembly constituency in the Andhra Pradesh Legislative Assembly from 2014 to 2019 from Telugu Desam Party. He unsuccessfully contested the 2019 Lok Sabha election from Ongole Lok Sabha constituency. He joined the YSR Congress Party in June 2020.

== Early life ==
Sidda Raghava Rao was born in Chimakurthy, Prakasam district to Sidda Venkateswarlu and Sidda Venkata Subbamma. He completed his schooling in Chimakurthy, intermediate education in Bapatla, and graduated in Commerce from Andhra University in 1977. He owns a granite business in Prakasam district.

== Political career ==
Sidda Raghava Rao was elected to the Andhra Pradesh Legislative Assembly as a member of the Telugu Desam Party (TDP) in 2014 from the Darsi Assembly constituency with a majority of 1,574. He served as the Minister of Transport from 2014 to 2018 and Minister of Environment, Forest, Science and Technology from 2017 to 2019 in the Third N. Chandrababu Naidu ministry. In 2019 he unsuccessfully contested from the Ongole Lok Sabha constituency from TDP. He joined the YSR Congress Party in 2020 and quit in 2024.

== Awards and recognition ==
- "Indira Priyadarshini" Award by National Unity Conference, New Delhi
- "Jewel of India" International President Council, New Delhi
- "Sri Vasavi" – Vasavi Seva Samithi Guntur
- "Ghantasala Sevaratna" by Ghantasala National Arts Academy, Hyderabad
- "Sahiti Poshaka" Abhinava Krishna Devaraya’ – Akshara Sahiti – Ongole
- "Dharma Prakash ‘’ Award – 2013 at Bangalore by All India Arya Vysya Maha Sabha
