= Pernamitta =

- Neighborhood
- Interactive map of Pernamitta
- Coordinates: 15°32′N 80°00′E
- Country: India
- State: Andhra Pradesh
- District: Prakasam

Languages
  - Official: Telugu
- Time zone: UTC+5:30 (IST)

Pernamitta is a locality of Ongole, Prakasam district of Andhra Pradesh. It became a part of Ongole Municipal Corporation in 2012.
