= Gachapin =

Japanese TV character

Gachapin (ガチャピン) is a TV character who appeared in the Japanese children's program Hirake! Ponkikki and its succeeding series Ponkickies on Fuji TV. He is a green buck-toothed anthropomorphic dinosaur and is usually accompanied by his friend Mukku, a red yeti with a yellow propeller on his head.

== Summary ==
Jōji Katakiri (President, Japan Software Video Club) was Gachapin's original designer and modeled the character after the sleepy-looking, somber face of Masahiro Noda, the President of Japan Television Workshop Co. Ltd., who also worked on the program. Rumors held that the character was based on Paul McCartney of the Beatles, but this was publicly denied.

The original voice actor for Gachapin was Kunie Yasawa. The current voice actor for the character is Kuniko Amemiya.

In the first season of Hirake! Ponkikki, the Captain traveled to a southern island and brought back an egg from which Gachapin hatched. Initially shy and easy-going, Gachapin evolved into an adventurous character and went on to attempt skiing, rock climbing, hang-gliding, scuba diving, karate, gymnastics, bowling, and figure skating, as well as an adventure in a space craft. Each episode was triggered by Gachapin's interest in environmental problems and his enthusiasm for space crafts. Gachapin has seven energy balls on each wrist that are the source of his bravery and power, and his phenomenal reflexes come from the carbohydrates inside these balls.

Gachapin's catchphrase that he uses to introduce himself is "Gacha-gacha-pin-pin, this is Gachapin".

The program's theme song, "Year 2100 Gachapin Kid", showed his superhero form "Gachapin Kid" whenever Earth was in danger. In 2006, on BS Fuji, Gachapin fought against Pierre Kasher in "Ike Ike Gachapin" (Go, Go, Gachapin).

Former AKB48 member Minami Minegishi is nicknamed "Gachapin" because of facial similarities.

== Appearances ==
- On September 20, 2007, Hudson Soft released Gachapin's Diary DS (ガチャピン日記DS), a jigsaw puzzle video game starring Gachapin for the Nintendo DS handheld game console.
- On December 10, 2007, Hudson Soft released Gacha Washi Meijin no Bōken Jima (ガチャはし名人の冒険島), a cross-over between the Gachapin series and the Adventure Island series.
- On October 8, 2010, a Vocaloid was released by Internet Co., Ltd. based on the voice of Gachapin called "Gachapoid"; the mascot of the vocal was called "Ryuto".
- He and Mukku appear in Like A Dragon: Infinite Wealth’s Dondoko Island mode. They also appeared in Granblue Fantasy during its special gacha events, as well as their own event in 2019, entitled "Gachapin, Mukku, and the Azure Adventure", along with Kemono Friends 3 as anthropomorphic versions of themselves.

=== Guest appearances ===
Gachapin along with Mukku sometimes appears as a guest on TV and radio shows run by Fuji TV.

- On May 5, 1992, Gachapin appeared with Mukku as a guest on the NHK program Okaasan to Issho (おかあさんといっしょ). A character called Nikonikopun also appeared in this show.
- When Gachapin appeared in Tamori's Waratte Iitomo! (笑っていいとも!), co-host Masahiro Nakai mentioned that the balls on Gachapin's wrist looked like warts.
- In episode 35 of Digimon Adventure, Mukku and P-chan fight evil Digimon which appear in Tokyo. Gachapin also appears in this episode.
- In 1998, Gachapin and Mukku appeared in the story "Angry rock, scissors, paper squad" (おごってジャンケン隊) in Big Comic Spirits written by Yoko Gendai. It was mentioned that he receives 50 yen each month as pocket money.
- On August 30, 2006, Gachapin and Mukku worked for "Shadow Nare" on "Tropia fountain ~ Wonderful wasteful knowledge" (トリビアの泉 ～素晴らしきムダ知識～). Also, on May 12, 2007, they took up the challenge of working in a lunch box factory, a convenience store, as firefighters and fishing for skipjack tuna from a boat as well as performing stunts on a special of the same show.
- On October 23, 2006, they participated in roulette bowling using specially made balls on the SMAPxSMAP show.
- On November 9, 2006, Gachapin appeared on The Best House 123 (ザ・ベストハウス123) show as a guest and organized the top three Gachapin challenges.
- In January 2007, Gachapin appeared as a guest, his drama program debut, in Kirakira Medical Intern (きらきら研修医) which aired on TBS and whose main character was played by Manami Konishi.
- He has also appeared as a guest on various radio shows in Japan such as TBS radio, culture broadcasts, TOKYO-FM and J-WAVE.
- In 2007, Gachapin appeared in the music video "Read My Mind" by the Killers, the American rock band. The scene showed Gachapin inside a capsule hotel in Tokyo with a member from the band.
- On August 12, 2007, he appeared in the Air Guitar 2007 Japan final held at Makuhari hall in 2007. B'z "girigiri chop" performed in the background. He received 3rd prize for his performance. His dialogue with Souichi Negishi (Johan Klaus II), one of the judges, evoke a great deal of laughter. At the same show, Shin Nohara from Crayon Shin-chan also appeared as a guest.
- He appeared as a guest of the dream team in "Tamori's Super Vocabulary Heaven" (タモリの超ボキャブラ天国).
- On September 17, 2010, as part of the 2010 Tokyo Game Show, he was announced as a Downloadable Content character in the cancelled Mega Man Universe as "Megapin".
- On July 19, 2014, Gachapin & Mukku showed up in a Japanese Music Video called "Gummibär Gachapin Mukku Japanese Animated Music Video ガチャピン" for Gummibär's YouTube Channel (The Official Gummibär Channel), which is up on YouTube.
- On December 21, 2019, Gachapin & Mukku appeared in the 192nd episode of the 2016 anime adaptation of Bonobono.

== Exposure outside Japan ==
Gachapin is best known outside Japan for his appearance in the "Read My Mind" music video by The Killers.

Gachapin and Mukku's show My Ponkikki was aired in America without English subtitles. It was aired on LA18 (KSCI) in the Southern California area run by Fujisankei Communications International Inc. (FCI) in an hour block called Tokyo Kids Club featuring Chibi Maruko-chan and My Ponkikki from 2000 to 2009.

The Japanese rock band Mucc takes its name from the character Mukku. Dominic Howard (Muse drummer) wore a Gachapin suit on the Japan Tour 2010. While Toru Yamashita (One Ok Rock's leader and guitarist) is very well known to be identified with Gachapin.

Gachapin and Mukku are also the source of the internet meme DSFARGEG, in which a user on an imageboard would post a video or image with Mukku and be instantly banned.
