= Mukku =

Mukku (Telugu: ముక్కు) is a Telugu surname. Notable people with the surname include:

- Mukku Kasi Reddy (born 1955), Indian politician
- Mukku Raju (1931–2014), Indian actor
- Mukku Ugra Narasimha Reddy (born 1974), Indian politician
