= Buchepalli Siva Prasad Reddy =

Indian politician

Member of the Andhra Pradesh Legislative Assembly
- Incumbent
- Assumed office 2024
- Preceded by: Maddisetty Venugopal
- Constituency: Darsi
- In office 2009–2014
- Preceded by: Buchepalli Subba Reddy
- Succeeded by: Sidda Raghava Rao
- Constituency: Darsi

Personal details
- Born: 6 April 1980 (age 46) Chimakurthy, India
- Party: YSR Congress Party
- Other political affiliations: Indian National Congress
- Occupation: Politician, doctor

Buchepalli Siva Prasad Reddy is an Indian politician from Andhra Pradesh. He represented Darsi constituency in the 13th assembly term from the Indian National Congress (INC). After he joined YSR Congress Party (YSRCP) in 2014, he lost Darsi constituency. In 2019 he could not contest elections because of family problems. He studied in B.V. Subbayya school in Pernamitta. Prior to entering politics he did his doctorate from Sri Ramachandra Medical College.

== Political career ==
Reddy entered politics and won the Mandal Parishad Territorial Constituency of Chimakurthy in August 2005 and was Mandal Parishad President.

Later, he contested as a Member of the Legislative Assembly (MLA) from Darsi constituency from Indian National Congress against Telugu Desam Party candidate Mannam Venkata Ramana, and won the election.

He contested from YSR Congress Party in 2014 and lost the election to Sidda Raghava Rao.

Year	Constituency	Political Party	Result
2009	Darsi	Indian National Congress	Won
2014	Darsi	YSR Congress Party	Lost
2024	Darsi	YSR Congress Party	Won

Reddy did not contest 2019 elections and extended his support to the party candidates suggested by his chief Jagan in Darsi and Santhanuthalapadu constituency, and played a pivotal role in their winning.

== See also ==
- Darsi
- Santhanuthalapadu
