= Edara Hari Babu =

Indian politician

Chairman of Prakasam Zilla Praja Parishad
- In office 2014–2019
- Preceded by: Katam Aruna
- Succeeded by: Buchepalli Venkayamma
- Constituency: Ongole

Member of Legislative Assembly, Andhra Pradesh
- In office 2009–2014
- Preceded by: Bachala Balaiah
- Succeeded by: Balineni Srinivasa Reddy
- Constituency: Ongole

Personal details
- Party: Telugu Desam Party
- Occupation: Politician

Edara Hari Babu (born 1955) is an Indian Politician and a former Member of Legislative Assembly, Ongole from Telugu Desam Party, Andhra Pradesh.
