= Department of Transport (Andhra Pradesh) =

Minister of Transport
- Ravāṇā Śākha Mantrī
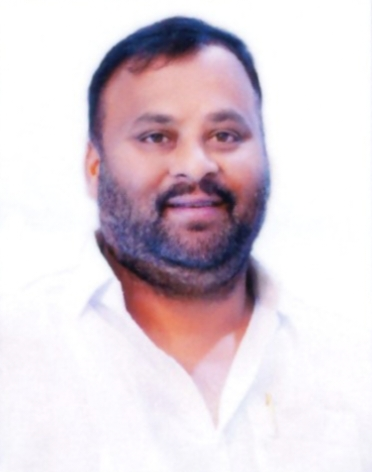
- Incumbent; Mandipalli Ramprasad Reddy since 12 June 2024
- Department of Transport
- Member of: Andha Pradesh Cabinet
- Reports to: Governor of Andhra Pradesh; Chief Minister of Andhra Pradesh; Andhra Pradesh Legislature
- Appointer: Governor of Andhra Pradesh; on the advice of the Chief Minister of Andhra Pradesh
- Inaugural holder: Sidda Raghava Rao
- Formation: 8 June 2014
- Website: Official website

The minister for transport is the head of the Department of Transport in the Government of Andhra Pradesh.

The incumbent minister of transport is Mandipalli Ramprasad Reddy from Telugu Desam Party.

== List of ministers ==
#	Portrait	Minister (Lifespan) Constituency	Term of office			Election (Term)	Party	Ministry	Chief Minister	Ref.
#	Portrait	Minister (Lifespan) Constituency	Term start	Term end	Duration	Election (Term)	Party	Ministry	Chief Minister	Ref.
1		Sidda Raghava Rao (born 1957); MLA for Darsi	8 June 2014	1 April 2017	2 years, 297 days	2014 (14th)	Telugu Desam Party	Naidu III	N. Chandrababu Naidu	
2		Kinjarapu Atchannaidu (born 1969); MLA for Tekkali	2 April 2017	29 May 2019	2 years, 57 days	2014 (14th)	Telugu Desam Party	Naidu III	N. Chandrababu Naidu	
3		Perni Venkataramaiah (born 1967); MLA for Machilipatnam	30 May 2019	7 April 2022	2 years, 312 days	2019 (15th)	YSR Congress Party	Jagan	Y. S. Jagan Mohan Reddy	
4		Pinipe Viswarup (born 1962); MLA for Amalapuram	11 April 2022	11 June 2024	2 years, 61 days	2019 (15th)	YSR Congress Party	Jagan	Y. S. Jagan Mohan Reddy	
5		Mandipalli Ramprasad Reddy (born 1982); MLA for Rayachoti	12 June 2024	Incumbent	2 years, 112 days	2024 (16th)	Telugu Desam Party	Naidu IV	N. Chandrababu Naidu	
