= Kanigiri Assembly constituency =

Constituency of the Andhra Pradesh Legislative Assembly, India

Coordinates: 15.40°N 79.51°E

Kanigiri
- Constituency No. 113 for the Andhra Pradesh Legislative Assembly
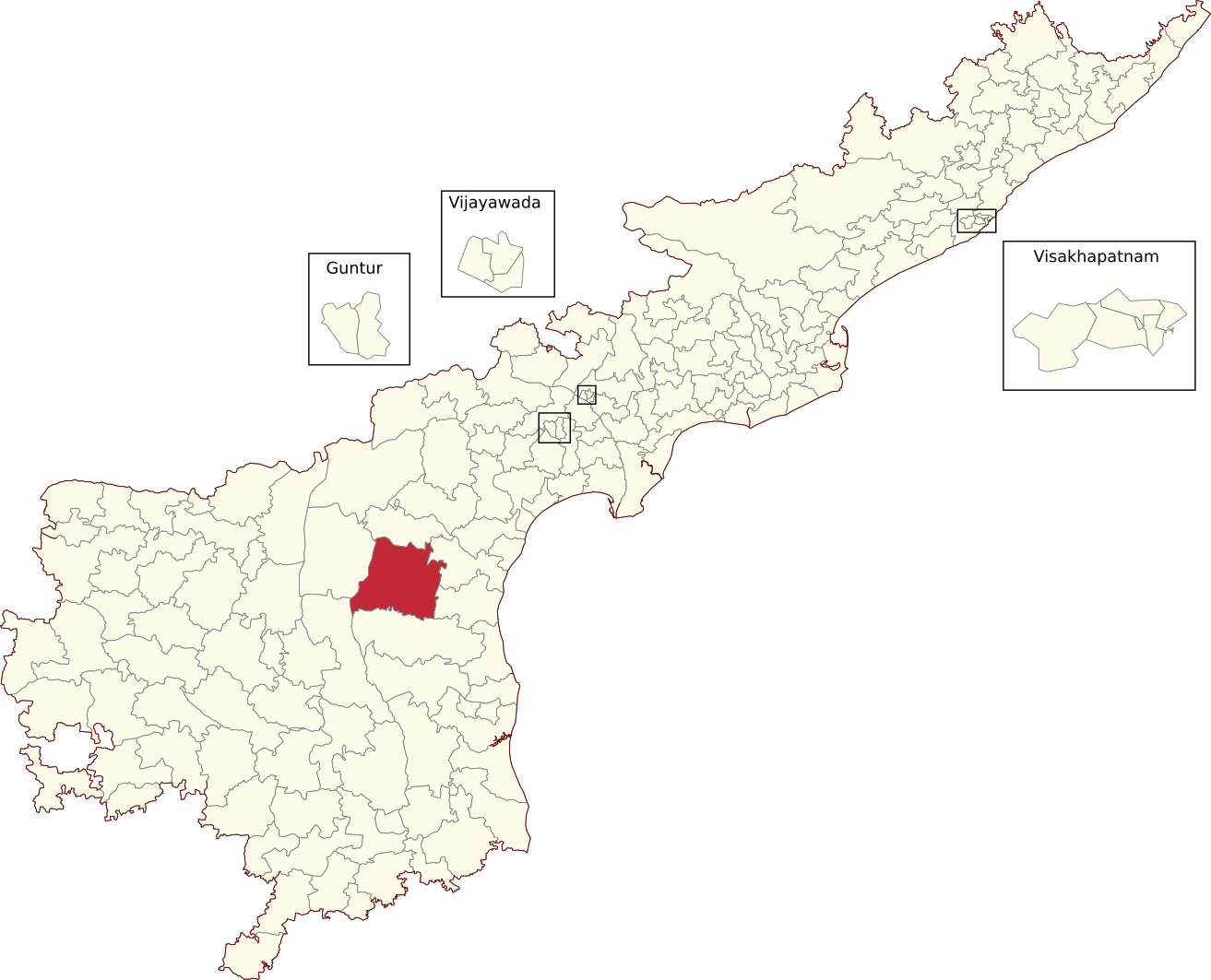
- Location of Kanigiri Assembly constituency within Andhra Pradesh

Constituency details
- Country: India
- Region: South India
- State: Andhra Pradesh
- District: Markapuram
- Lok Sabha constituency: Ongole
- Established: 1951
- Total electors: 231,881
- Reservation: None

Member of Legislative Assembly
- 16th Andhra Pradesh Legislative Assembly
- Incumbent Mukku Ugra Narasimha Reddy
- Party: TDP
- Alliance: NDA
- Elected year: 2024

Kanigiri Assembly constituency is a constituency in Markapuram district of Andhra Pradesh that elects representatives to the Andhra Pradesh Legislative Assembly in India. It is one of the seven assembly segments of Ongole Lok Sabha constituency.

Mukku Ugra Narasimha Reddy is the current MLA of the constituency, having won the 2024 Andhra Pradesh Legislative Assembly election from Telugu Desam Party. As of 2024, there are a total of 231,881 electors in the constituency. The constituency was established in 1951, as per the Delimitation Orders (1951).

== Mandals ==
Mandal
Hanumanthunipadu
Chandrasekharapuram
Pamuru
Veligandla
Pedacherlopalle
Kanigiri

== Members of the Legislative Assembly ==
Year	Member	Political party
1952	Gujjula Yallamanda Reddy	Communist Party of India
1955	Gujjula Yallamanda Reddy	Communist Party of India
1962	Kotapati Guruswamy Reddy	Communist Party of India
1967	Puli Venkata Reddy	Indian National Congress
1972	Sura Papi Reddy	Independent
1978	Buthalapalli Ramasubba Reddy	Indian National Congress (I)
1983	Mukku Kasi Reddy	Telugu Desam Party
1985	Mukku Kasi Reddy	Telugu Desam Party
1989	Erigineni Thirupathi Naidu	Indian National Congress
1994	Mukku Kasi Reddy	Telugu Desam Party
1999	Erigineni Thirupathi Naidu	Indian National Congress
2004	Erigineni Thirupathi Naidu	Indian National Congress
2009	Mukku Ugra Narasimha Reddy	Indian National Congress
2014	Kadiri Babu Rao	Telugu Desam Party
2019	Burra Madhu Sudhan Yadav	YSR Congress Party
2024	Mukku Ugra Narasimha Reddy	Telugu Desam Party

== Election results ==
=== 2024 ===
2024 Andhra Pradesh Legislative Assembly election: Kanigiri
Party	Candidate	Votes	%	±%
TDP	Mukku Ugra Narasimha Reddy	107,045	51.93	
YSRCP	Daddala Narayana Yadav	92,441	44.84	
INC	Devarapalli Subba Reddy	1,838	0.89	
NOTA	None Of The Above	2,217	1.08	
Majority		14,604	7.08	
Turnout		2,06,147		
TDP gain from YSRCP		Swing		

=== 2019 ===
2019 Andhra Pradesh Legislative Assembly election: Kanigiri
Party	Candidate	Votes	%	±%
YSRCP	Burra Madhu Sudhan Yadav	112,730	58.48	
TDP	Mukku Ugra Narasimha Reddy	71,827	37.26	
Majority		40,903	21.45	
Turnout		1,90,676	82.23	+5.67
YSRCP gain from TDP		Swing		

=== 2014 ===
2014 Andhra Pradesh Legislative Assembly election: Kanigiri
Party	Candidate	Votes	%	±%
TDP	Kadiri Babu Rao	79,492	50.00	
YSRCP	Burra Madhu Sudhan Yadav	72,385	45.47	
Majority		7,107	4.53	
Turnout		158,970	76.56	+9.17
TDP gain from YSRCP		Swing		

=== 2009 ===
2009 Andhra Pradesh Legislative Assembly election: Kanigiri
Party	Candidate	Votes	%	±%
INC	Mukku Ugra Narasimha Reddy	60,161	45.81	−7.69
Independent	Sunkari Madhu Sudhana Rao	57,226	43.58	
Majority		2,935	2.23	
Turnout		131,326	67.39	−2.28
INC hold		Swing		

=== 2004 ===
2004 Andhra Pradesh Legislative Assembly election: Kanigiri
Party	Candidate	Votes	%	±%
INC	Erigineni Thirupathi Naidu	53,010	53.50	+1.71
TDP	Mukku Kasi Reddy	43,735	44.14	−2.54
Majority		9,175	9.36	
Turnout		99,075	69.67	+9.18
INC hold		Swing		

=== 1999 ===
1999 Andhra Pradesh Legislative Assembly election: Kanigiri
Party	Candidate	Votes	%	±%
INC	Erigineni Thirupathi Naidu	52,566	51.79%	
TDP	Mukku Kasi Reddy	47,412	46.71%	
Margin of victory		5,154	5.08%	
Turnout		104,062	62.01%	
Registered electors		167,808		
INC gain from TDP		Swing		

=== 1994 ===
1994 Andhra Pradesh Legislative Assembly election: Kanigiri
Party	Candidate	Votes	%	±%
TDP	Mukku Kasi Reddy	52,025	54.34%	
INC	Erigineni Thirupathi Naidu	37,288	38.95%	
Margin of victory		14,737	15.39%	
Turnout		97,714	64.59%	
Registered electors		151,287		
TDP gain from INC		Swing		

=== 1989 ===
1989 Andhra Pradesh Legislative Assembly election: Kanigiri
Party	Candidate	Votes	%	±%
INC	Erigineni Thirupathi Naidu	59,789	60.10%	
TDP	Mukku Kasi Reddy	39,688	39.90%	
Margin of victory		20,101	20.21%	
Turnout		102,840	63.98%	
Registered electors		160,739		
INC gain from TDP		Swing		

=== 1985 ===
1985 Andhra Pradesh Legislative Assembly election: Kanigiri
Party	Candidate	Votes	%	±%
TDP	Mukku Kasi Reddy	31,286	36.17%	
INC	Erigineni Thirupathi Naidu	29,696	34.33%	
Margin of victory		1,590	1.84%	
Turnout		87,770	68.14%	
Registered electors		128,813		
TDP hold		Swing		

=== 1983 ===
1983 Andhra Pradesh Legislative Assembly election: Kanigiri
Party	Candidate	Votes	%	±%
TDP	Mukku Kasi Reddy	35,380	48.25%	
INC	Buthalapalli Ramasubba Reddy	27,588	37.62%	
Margin of victory		7,792	10.63%	
Turnout		74,592	63.84%	
Registered electors		116,841		
TDP gain from INC(I)		Swing		

=== 1978 ===
1978 Andhra Pradesh Legislative Assembly election: Kanigiri
Party	Candidate	Votes	%	±%
INC(I)	Buthalapalli Ramasubba Reddy	36,693	48.86%	
JP	Parna Venkaiah Naidu	34,752	46.27%	
Margin of victory		1,941	2.58%	
Turnout		76,352	68.63%	
Registered electors		111,251		
= Indian National Congress (I) gain from Independent		Swing		

=== 1972 ===
1972 Andhra Pradesh Legislative Assembly election: Kanigiri
Party	Candidate	Votes	%	±%
Independent	Sura Papi Reddy	20,277	40.23%	
INC	Macherla Vengaiah	15,888	31.53%	
Margin of victory		4,389	8.71%	
Turnout		51,599	61.44%	
Registered electors		83,985		
Independent gain from INC		Swing		

=== 1967 ===
1967 Andhra Pradesh Legislative Assembly election: Kanigiri
Party	Candidate	Votes	%	±%
INC	Puli Venkata Reddy	25,620	48.69%	
Independent	Sura Papi Reddy	23,350	44.38%	
Margin of victory		2,270	4.31%	
Turnout		54,815	67.62%	
Registered electors		81,058		
INC hold		Swing		

=== 1962 ===
1962 Andhra Pradesh Legislative Assembly election: Kanigiri
Party	Candidate	Votes	%	±%
CPI	Kotapati Guruswamy Reddy	22,392	53.38%	
INC	Shaik Mowla Sahib	19,557	46.62%	
Margin of victory		2,835	6.76%	
Turnout		43,372	65.97%	
Registered electors		65,743		
CPI hold		Swing		

=== 1955 ===
1955 Andhra State Legislative Assembly election: Kanigiri
Party	Candidate	Votes	%	±%
CPI	Gujjula Yallamanda Reddy	19,241	57.11%	
INC	Tumati Surendra Mohan Gandhi Chowdary	14,453	42.89%	
Margin of victory		4,788	14.21%	
Turnout		33,694	60.16%	
Registered electors		56,009		
CPI hold		Swing		

=== 1952 ===
1952 Madras State Legislative Assembly election: Kanigiri
Party	Candidate	Votes	%	±%
CPI	Gujjala Yellamanda Reddy	23,953	66.38%	
INC	Devi Reddy Lakhmireddy	5,701	15.80%	15.80%
KMPP	Chimatenama Rao	3,206	8.88%	
Independent	Chigurupati Sriramulu	1,910	5.29%	
Independent	Neeli Setti Basaviah	1,316	3.65%	
Margin of victory		18,252	50.58%	
Turnout		36,086	43.70%	
Registered electors		82,577		
CPI win (new seat)				

== See also ==
- List of constituencies of Andhra Pradesh Legislative Assembly
