= Erigineni Thirupathi Naidu =

Indian politician

Shri. Erigineni Thirupathi Naidu

Member of Andhra Pradesh Legislative Assembly
- In office 1999–2009
- Preceded by: Mukku Kasi Reddy
- Succeeded by: Mukku Ugra Narasimha Reddy
- Constituency: Kanigiri
- In office 1989–1994
- Preceded by: Mukku Kasi Reddy
- Succeeded by: Mukku Kasi Reddy
- Constituency: Kanigiri

Personal details
- Born: 7 May 1938 Mattigunta village, Naguluppalapadu, Prakasam district, Andhra Pradesh, India
- Died: 25 August 2017 (aged 59) Hyderabad, Telangana, India
- Citizenship: Indian
- Party: Indian National Congress
- Parent: George
- Occupation: Politician

Erigineni Thirupathi Naidu (1938–2017) was an Indian politician from Andhra Pradesh. Naidu was born on 20 September 1938 in the village of Mopadu, Andhra Pradesh. After intermediate high school Naidu started working in the agricultural sector, while also being interested in sports and politics. In Pamuru, Andhra Pradesh, the Erigineni Thirupathi Naidu & Lakshmamma College bears his and his wife's names.

== Political career ==
Naidu was a leader of the Indian National Congress. He began his political career as president of Mopadu village Panchayat, and became a MLA in 1989. Defeated in 1994 while seeking re-election, Naidu was re-elected in 1999 and elected to the Andhra Pradesh Legislative Assembly in 2004 before retiring from politics in 2009 at the age of 71.
