= Darsi Assembly constituency =

Constituency of the Andhra Pradesh Legislative Assembly, India

Coordinates: 15.78°N 79.67°E

Darsi
- Constituency No. 103 for the Andhra Pradesh Legislative Assembly
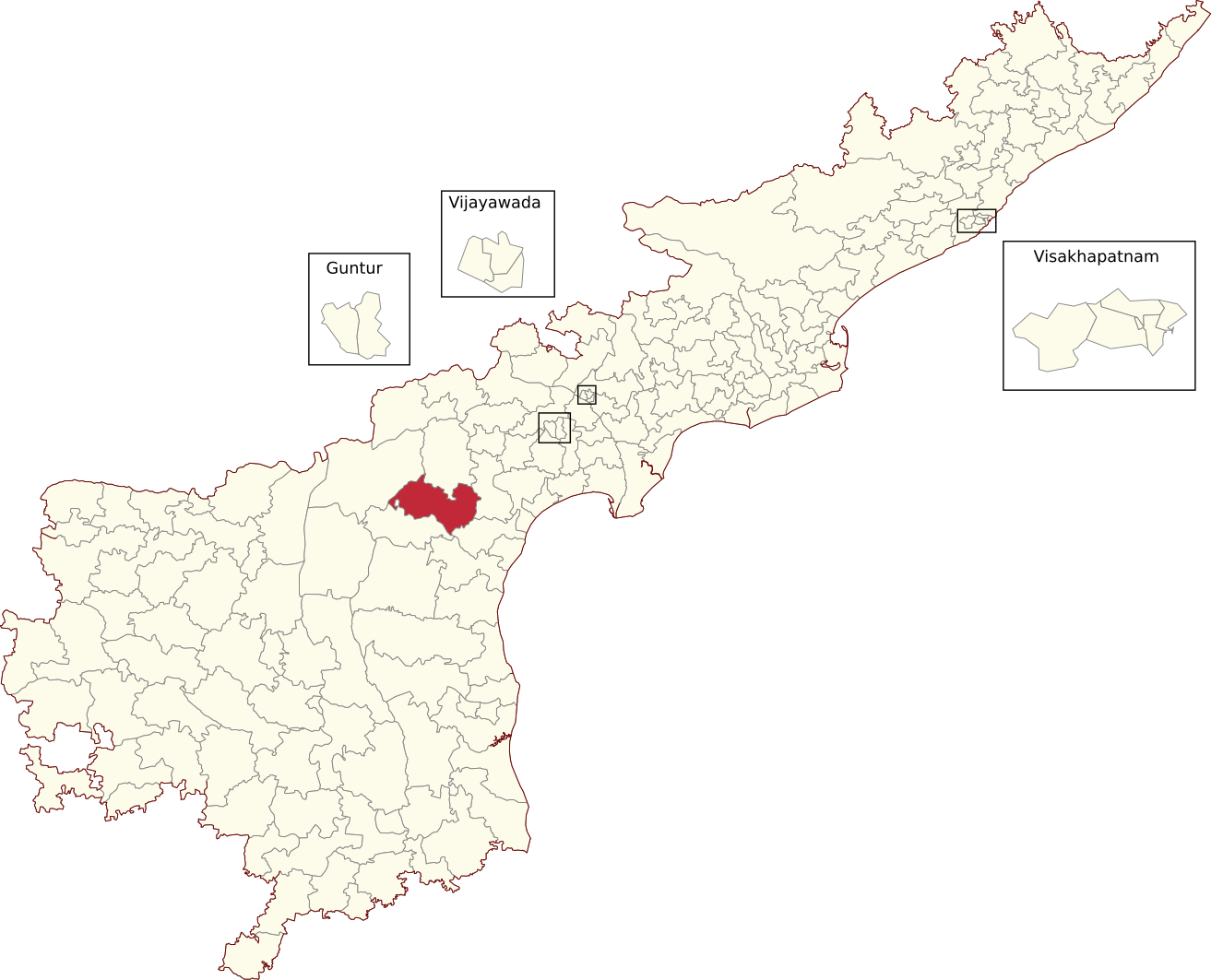
- Location of Darsi Assembly constituency within Andhra Pradesh

Constituency details
- Country: India
- Region: South India
- State: Andhra Pradesh
- District: Prakasam
- Lok Sabha constituency: Ongole
- Established: 1951
- Total electors: 214,233
- Reservation: None

Member of Legislative Assembly
- 16th Andhra Pradesh Legislative Assembly
- Incumbent Buchepalli Siva Prasad Reddy
- Party: YSRCP
- Elected year: 2024

Darsi Assembly constituency is a constituency in Prakasam district of Andhra Pradesh that elects representatives to the Andhra Pradesh Legislative Assembly in India. It is one of the seven assembly segments of Ongole Lok Sabha constituency.

Buchepalli Siva Prasad Reddy is the current MLA of the constituency, having won the 2024 Andhra Pradesh Legislative Assembly election from YSR Congress Party. As of 2019, there are a total of 214,233 electors in the constituency. The constituency was established in 1951, as per the Delimitation Orders (1951).

== Mandals ==
Mandal
Talluru
Kurichedu
Mundlamuru
Darsi
Donakonda

== Members of the Legislative Assembly ==
Year	Member	Political party
1952	Sanikommu Kasi Reddy	Communist Party of India
1955	Dirisala Venkata Ramana Reddy	Indian National Congress
1962	Dirisala Venkata Ramana Reddy	Indian National Congress
1967	Ravipati Mahananda	Swatantra Party
1972	Dirisala Raja Gopala Reddy	Indian National Congress
1978	Berre Gnana Prakasam	Indian National Congress (I)
1983	Katuri Narayana Swamy	Telugu Desam Party
1985	Narapusetty Sriramulu	Telugu Desam Party
1989	Sanikommu Pitchi Reddy	Indian National Congress
1994	Narapusetty Sriramulu	Telugu Desam Party
1997	Narapusetty Paparao	Telugu Desam Party
1999	Sanikommu Pitchi Reddy	Indian National Congress
2004	Buchepalli Subba Reddy	Independent
2009	Buchepalli Siva Prasad Reddy	Indian National Congress
2014	Sidda Raghava Rao	Telugu Desam Party
2019	Maddisetty Venugopal	YSR Congress Party
2024	Buchepalli Siva Prasad Reddy	YSR Congress Party

== Election results ==
=== 1952 ===
1952 Madras State Legislative Assembly election: Darsi
Party	Candidate	Votes	%	±%
CPI	Sanekomma Kasireddi	18,703	58.16	
KLP	Ravipathi Mohanada	7,317	22.75	
INC	S. Kotireddi	6,139	19.09	19.09
Margin of victory		11,386	35.41	
Turnout		32,159	43.51	
Registered electors		73,909		
CPI win (new seat)				

=== 1955 ===
1955 Andhra State Legislative Assembly election: Darsi
Party	Candidate	Votes	%	±%
INC	Dirisala Venkata Ramana Reddy	14,980	53.97	
CPI	Singaraju Ramakrishnaiah	12,775	46.03	
Margin of victory		2,205	7.94	
Turnout		27,755	51.62	
Registered electors		53,769		
INC gain from CPI		Swing		

=== 1962 ===
1962 Andhra Pradesh Legislative Assembly election: Darsi
Party	Candidate	Votes	%	±%
INC	Dirisala Venkata Ramana Reddy	14,411	35.55	
CPI	Nusam Kasi Reddy	13,533	33.38	
Margin of victory		878	2.17	
Turnout		42,378	69.49	
Registered electors		60,980		
INC hold		Swing		

=== 1967 ===
1967 Andhra Pradesh Legislative Assembly election: Darsi
Party	Candidate	Votes	%	±%
SWA	Mahananda Ravipati	32,931	56.96	
INC	Dirisala Venkata Ramana Reddy	24,885	43.04	
Margin of victory		8,046	13.92	
Turnout		60,013	73.27	
Registered electors		81,904		
Swantantra Party gain from INC		Swing		

=== 1972 ===
1972 Andhra Pradesh Legislative Assembly election: Darsi
Party	Candidate	Votes	%	±%
INC	D Raja Gopala Reddy	31,125	52.44	
Independent	Mahananda Ravipati	26,407	44.49	
Margin of victory		4,718	7.95	
Turnout		60,886	69.89	
Registered electors		87,117		
INC gain from SWA		Swing		

=== 1978 ===
1978 Andhra Pradesh Legislative Assembly election: Darsi
Party	Candidate	Votes	%	±%
INC(I)	Berre Gnana Prakasam	24,225	34.71	
JP	Muvvala Srihari Rao	22,767	32.62	
Margin of victory		1,458	2.09	
Turnout		71,391	65.09	
Registered electors		109,673		
INC(I) gain from INC		Swing		

=== 1983 ===
1983 Andhra Pradesh Legislative Assembly election: Darsi
Party	Candidate	Votes	%	±%
TDP	Katuri Narayana Swamy	43,730	59.72	
INC	Dirisala Raja Gopala Reddy	27,272	37.24	
Margin of victory		16,458	22.47	
Turnout		74,484	63.34	
Registered electors		117,585		
TDP gain from INC(I)		Swing		

=== 1985 ===
1985 Andhra Pradesh Legislative Assembly election: Darsi
Party	Candidate	Votes	%	±%
TDP	Narapusetty Sreeramulu	42,471	49.01	
INC	Sanikommu Pitchi Reddy	42,193	48.69	
Margin of victory		278	0.32	
Turnout		87,885	65.19	
Registered electors		134,806		
TDP hold		Swing		

=== 1989 ===
1989 Andhra Pradesh Legislative Assembly election: Darsi
Party	Candidate	Votes	%	±%
INC	Sanikommu Pitchi Reddy	56,165	49.51	
TDP	Veginati Kotaiah	54,879	48.38	
Margin of victory		1,286	1.13	
Turnout		116,409	67.53	
Registered electors		172,389		
INC gain from TDP		Swing		

=== 1994 ===
1994 Andhra Pradesh Legislative Assembly election: Darsi
Party	Candidate	Votes	%	±%
TDP	Narapasetty Sriramulu	50,769	48.89	
INC	Mohammed Ghouse Shaik	34,071	32.81	
Margin of victory		16,698	16.08	
Turnout		106,251	65.42	
Registered electors		162,407		
TDP gain from INC		Swing		

=== 1999 ===
1999 Andhra Pradesh Legislative Assembly election: Darsi
Party	Candidate	Votes	%	±%
INC	Sanikommu Pitchi Reddy	70,387	54.61	
TDP	Vema Venkata Subba Rao	57,209	44.38	
Margin of victory		13,178	10.22	
Turnout		132,436	68.54	
Registered electors		193,213		
INC gain from TDP		Swing		

=== 2004 ===
2004 Andhra Pradesh Legislative Assembly election: Darsi
Party	Candidate	Votes	%	±%
Independent	Buchepalli Subba Reddy	50,431	38.46	
TDP	Kadiri Babu Rao	48,021	36.62	−7.76
INC	Sanikommu Pitchi Reddy	29,575	22.55	−20.41
Majority		2,410	1.84	
Turnout		131,125	72.26	+5.65
Independent gain from INC		Swing		

=== 2009 ===
2009 Andhra Pradesh Legislative Assembly election: Darsi
Party	Candidate	Votes	%	±%
INC	Buchepalli Siva Prasad Reddy	66,418	42.96	
TDP	Mannam Venkata Ramana	53,028	34.30	
PRP	Maddisetty Venugopal	27,221	17.61	
Majority		13,390	8.66	
Turnout		154,589	86.37	+14.11
INC gain from Independent		Swing		

=== 2014 ===
2014 Andhra Pradesh Legislative Assembly election: Darsi
Party	Candidate	Votes	%	±%
TDP	Sidda Raghava Rao	88,821	49.00	
YSRCP	Buchepalli Siva Prasad Reddy	87,447	48.20	
Majority		1,574	0.80	
Turnout		182,010	91.52	+5.15
TDP gain from YSRCP		Swing		

=== 2019 ===
2019 Andhra Pradesh Legislative Assembly election: Darsi
Party	Candidate	Votes	%	±%
YSRCP	Maddisetty Venugopal	111,914	57.29	
TDP	Kadiri Babu Rao	72,857	37.30	
JSP	Botuku Ramesh Babu	3,828	2.5	
Majority		39,057	19.75	
Turnout		1,95,348	91.52	
YSRCP gain from TDP		Swing		

=== 2024 ===
2024 Andhra Pradesh Legislative Assembly election: Darsi
Party	Candidate	Votes	%	±%
YSRCP	Buchepalli Siva Prasad Reddy	101,889	49.20	
TDP	Gottipati Lakshmi	99,433	48.01	
NOTA	None of the above	2,107	1.07	
Majority		2,456	1.18	
Turnout		2,07,106		
YSRCP hold		Swing		

== See also ==
- Prakasam district
- List of constituencies of Andhra Pradesh Legislative Assembly
