= Gachapoid =

Vocaloid synthesizer software

- Gachapoid V3 download display art
- Developers: Internet Co., Ltd. Fuji Television Kids Entertainment, Inc. YAMAHA Corporation
- Release: October 8, 2010
- Stable release: Gachapoid V3 / September 17, 2014
- Operating system: Windows
- Platform: PC
- Available in: Japanese
- Type: Vocal Synthesizer Application
- License: Proprietary

Gachapoid is a software application based on the character of Gachapin. It was originally developed for Vocaloid 2. The mascot of the software is called Ryuto (リュウト) and he is sampled from the actress Kuniko Amemiya, who is the current voice of Gachapin.

== Development ==
A special "Gachapoid", Gachapin x VOCALOID voice pack CD", was released on October 8, 2010, with a special green case and a free six-month subscription based on VOCALOID-flex to Nico Nico Douga's premium paid service.

Despite being released as a masculine character, during the development of VY2 the vocals of Ryuto or Kagamine Len vocal were not classified as "masculine vocals" and were not considered capable of holding a low masculine tones because of it. As a result, he and Len were not referenced in the development of VY2.

=== Additional software ===
Gachapoid is the only vocal of the Vocaloid 2 range with additional vocal software support. Gachapoid has access to the VOCALOID-flex engine and is used in conjunction with the software "V-Talk". V-Talk allows Gachapoid to be used in new ways, opening new methods of delicate editing to alter his vocal results.

On December 11, 2013 after it was asked if Ryuto would receive an update, as other Vocaloid 2 vocals were given one, it was tweeted that they had no plans for Gachapoid V3. On August 19, 2014, during a stream it was announced that Gachapoid V3 was starting production. It was later confirmed through a tweet that Gachapoid V3 would be download only. According to the Internet co., Ltd product page, the vocal was updated as part of the 40th anniversary celebration of Fuji TV's broadcast of Gachapin.

== Competition ==
An illustrations contest was held to celebrate the launch of Gachapoid V3.

== See also ==
- List of Vocaloid products
