= Andhra Kesari University =

University in Andhra Pradesh

- Seal of the Andhra Kesari University
- Other names: AKU
- Type: Public
- Established: 11 January 2022; 4 years ago
- Affiliations: UGC
- Chancellor: Governor of Andhra Pradesh
- Vice-Chancellor: D. V. R. Murthy
- Academic staff: 33
- Students: 580
- Location: Ongole, Prakasam, Andhra Pradesh, India
- Campus: Urban
- Website: akuprakasam.ac.in

Andhra Kesari University is a public university located in Ongole, Andhra Pradesh. It was established on 11 January 2022. The university was named after Tanguturi Prakasam, a political leader, social reformer and anti-colonial nationalist. He served as the chief minister of Madras Presidency and subsequently became the first chief minister of erstwhile Andhra State. He was known as "Andhra Kesari" which translates to "Lion of Andhra".

== History ==
Earlier, the university is the outgrowth initiative of the Post-Graduate centre of Acharya Nagarjuna University, which was established on 16 November 1993 with the aim of ensure better education to poor and backward communities in and around Prakasam district.

On 24 November 2021, Government of Andhra Pradesh introduced a bill in the Andhra Pradesh Legislative Assembly to upgrade the Post-Graduate centre into an autonomous university. On 11 January 2022, the university was officially established, through the A.P Universities (Amendment) Act, 2021.

=== Campus ===
The present Post-Graduate campus existed with 3.16 acres. In addition to this, it has 109.80 acres of land at Pernamitta, Ongole. The said multidisciplinary university is proposed to be established in Pernamitta village of Santhanuthalapadu mandal, Prakasam district, with an exclusive focus on Teacher Education, by relocating the existing P.G centre of Acharya Nagarjuna University.

== Academics ==
The university consists of 8 departments, offering 10 postgraduate programs.

=== Departments ===
- Commerce & Business Administration
- Economics
- History
- Mathematics
- Statistics
- Social Work
- Education
- Physical Education & Sports Sciences
