= Burra Madhusudan Yadav =

Indian politician (born 1972)

Member of the Legislative Assembly Andhra Pradesh
- In office 2019–2024
- Preceded by: Kadiri Babu Rao
- Succeeded by: Mukku Ugra Narasimha Reddy
- Constituency: Kanigiri

Personal details
- Born: 15 May 1972 (age 53) Prakasam district, Andhra Pradesh, India
- Party: YSR Congress Party
- Children: 3
- Occupation: Politician; general contractor

Burra Madhusudan Yadav (born 15 May 1972) is an Indian politician and a general contractor from the state of Andhra Pradesh. He was elected as the Member of the Legislative Assembly (MLA) to the Andhra Pradesh Legislative Assembly from Kanigiri Assembly constituency on behalf of YSR Congress Party (YSRCP) in 2019.

== Personal life ==
Yadav was born on 15 May 1972 to Burra Chinaperayya and Lakshmamma in Sivapuram, Prakasam district, Andhra Pradesh. He was educated until Intermediate education. He is married to Lakshmi and has 3 children. He resides in Kanigiri. His daughter Amrutha Bhargavi is married to Nitin Krishna, son of Kolusu Parthasarathy, MLA of Penamaluru Assembly constituency.

== Career ==
Yadav is a general contractor by profession. He entered politics taking an inspiration from Y. S. Rajasekhara Reddy, former chief minister of united Andhra Pradesh, and joined YSR Congress Party. He contested the 2014 Andhra Pradesh Legislative Assembly election from Kanigiri constituency on behalf of YSRCP and lost to Kadiri Babu Rao of Telugu Desam Party.

It was reported that Rao, who later joined YSRCP, could be contesting the 2019 Andhra Pradesh Legislative Assembly election on behalf of the party. However, the candidacy was given to Yadav, with Rao contesting from another constituency, and won as the MLA.

In September 2021, he was appointed a trustee of the Tirumala Tirupati Devasthanams governing board by the Government of Andhra Pradesh. He acted as the chief of YSRCP's Prakasam district unit from April until November 2022.
