= Damacharla Janardhana Rao =

Indian politician (born 1975)

Member of the Andhra Legislative Assembly
- Incumbent
- Assumed office 2024
- Preceded by: Balineni Srinivasa Reddy
- Constituency: Ongole
- In office 2014–2019
- Preceded by: Balineni Srinivasa Reddy
- Succeeded by: Balineni Srinivasa Reddy
- Constituency: Ongole

Personal details
- Born: 20 January 1975 (age 51)
- Party: Telugu Desam Party
- Spouse: Naga Satyalatha damacharla
- Children: anisha chowdary tanuja chowdary
- Occupation: Politician, MLA; Business

Damacharla Janardhana Rao (born 20 January 1975) is an Indian Politician and Member of Legislative Assembly, Ongole from Telugu Desam Party, Andhra Pradesh.

== Early life ==
He is the grandson of the former Minister, Damacharla Anjaneyulu. He did his schooling and Intermediate in Vignan College at Vadlamudi. He did his BTech in P.E.S from Institute of Technology (PES University) at Bangalore in 1998.

== Political career ==
He started his political career in TDP and has elected as Prakasam district TDP Party President in 2010 and from then until present date he is carrying the Party in the District. He expected Kondepi Constituency MLA ticket from TDP in 2009 which was vacant due to death of his grandfather, but the seat was reserved to SC in de limitation therefore he did not contest in 2009 election. He contested from Ongole By election in 2012 and lost against Balineni Srinivasa Reddy later in 2014 Andhra Pradesh Legislative Assembly election he won from the same Ongole Assembly Constituency against Balineni Srinivasa Reddy with a good majority of 12,428 votes. After that in the 2019 he was defeated by his arch-rival Balineni Srinivasa Reddy. In the 2024 Andhra Pradesh Legislative Assembly elections, Damacharla Janardhana Rao again won as MLA, Ongole against Balineni Srinivasa Reddy with a majority of 34026 votes.
