= Ongole Assembly constituency =

Constituency of the Andhra Pradesh Legislative Assembly, India

Coordinates: 15.51°N 80.04°E

Ongole
- Constituency No. 108 for the Andhra Pradesh Legislative Assembly
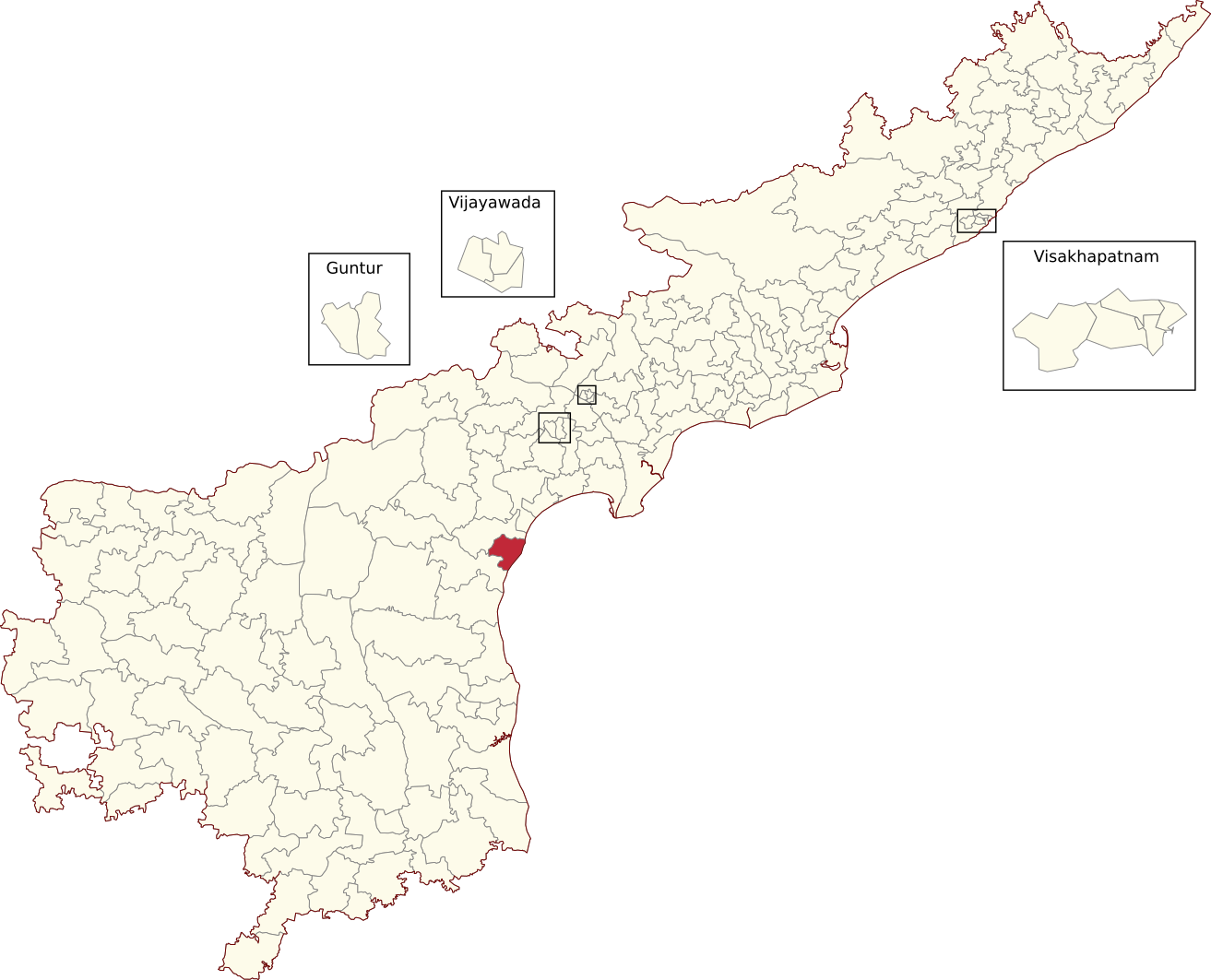
- Location of Ongole Assembly constituency within Andhra Pradesh

Constituency details
- Country: India
- Region: South India
- State: Andhra Pradesh
- District: Prakasam
- Lok Sabha constituency: Ongole
- Established: 1951
- Total electors: 229,317
- Reservation: None

Member of Legislative Assembly
- 16th Andhra Pradesh Legislative Assembly
- Incumbent Damacharla Janardhana Rao
- Party: TDP
- Alliance: NDA
- Elected year: 2024

Ongole Assembly constituency is a constituency in Prakasam district of Andhra Pradesh that elects representatives to the Andhra Pradesh Legislative Assembly in India. It is one of the seven assembly segments of Ongole Lok Sabha constituency.

Damacharla Janardhana Rao is the current MLA of the constituency, having won the 2024 Andhra Pradesh Legislative Assembly elections from Telugu Desam Party with a vote majority of 34,206. As of 2019, there are a total of 229,317 electors in the constituency. The constituency was established in 1951, as per the Delimitation Orders (1951).

== Mandals ==
Mandal
Ongole
Kothapatnam

== Members of the Legislative Assembly ==
Year	Member	Political party
1952	Kasukurthi Malakondiah	Communist Party of India
1955	Tanguturi Prakasam Panthulu	Indian National Congress
1957	Bollineni Venkata Lakshmi Narayana	Independent
1962	Bollineni Venkata Lakshmi Narayana	Independent
1967	C. R. Reddy	Indian National Congress
1972	Srungarapu Jeevaratnam Naidu	Indian National Congress
1978	Srungarapu Jeevaratnam Naidu	Indian National Congress
1983	Pongupati Koteswara Rao	Telugu Desam Party
1985	Pongupati Koteswara Rao	Telugu Desam Party
1989	Bachala Balaiah	Indian National Congress
1994	Edara Hari Babu	Telugu Desam Party
1999	Balineni Srinivasa Reddy	Indian National Congress
2004	Balineni Srinivasa Reddy	Indian National Congress
2009	Balineni Srinivasa Reddy	Indian National Congress
2012	Balineni Srinivasa Reddy	YSR Congress Party
2014	Damacharla Janardhana Rao	Telugu Desam Party
2019	Balineni Srinivasa Reddy	YSR Congress Party
2024	Damacharla Janardhana Rao	Telugu Desam Party

== Election results ==
=== 1952 ===
1952 Madras State Legislative Assembly election: Ongole
Party	Candidate	Votes	%	±%
CPI	Kasukurthi Malakondiah	37,716	22.49%	
CPI	Madala Narayannaswami	33,718	20.11%	
Independent	Dhara Gopalasastri	16,455	9.81%	
KLP	Bachina Subha Rao	16,284	9.71%	
KLP	Kakuman Kotaiah	10,588	6.31%	
KMPP	Dunmpa Ramakrishna Reddi	10,525	6.28%	
INC	Sagi Vijayaramaraju	9,809	5.85%	5.85%
Independent	Kommuri Raghavaiah	8,024	4.78%	
KMPP	Dhara Ramaswami	7,890	4.70%	
INC	Talluri Jiyyardoss	7,562	4.51%	4.51%
Independent	Bollapalli Ramadasu	2,535	1.51%	
Margin of victory		3,998	2.38%	
Turnout		1,67,706	103.34%	
Registered electors		1,62,288		
CPI win (new seat)				

=== 1957 (By-poll) ===
" "

1957 Andhra Pradesh Legislative Assembly by-election: Ongole
Party	Candidate	Votes	%	±%
Independent	B.V.L. Narayana	40,911		
INC	T.A. Devi	30,820		
Independent	Smt.T.A. Devi	2,376		
Margin of victory		10,091		
Turnout				
Independent gain from CPI		Swing		

=== 1962 ===
1962 Andhra Pradesh Legislative Assembly election: Ongole
Party	Candidate	Votes	%	±%
Independent	Bollineni Venkatalakshmi Narayana	24,506	55.02%	
INC	Ronda Narapa Reddy	18,419	41.35%	
Margin of victory		6,087	13.67%	
Turnout		46,629	63.93%	
Registered electors		72,941		
Independent hold		Swing		

=== 1967 ===
1967 Andhra Pradesh Legislative Assembly election: Ongole
Party	Candidate	Votes	%	±%
INC	C.R.Reddy	27,503	48.48%	
Independent	Bollineni Venkatalakshmi Narayana	19,491	34.35%	
Margin of victory		8,012	14.12%	
Turnout		59,660	77.01%	
Registered electors		77,467		
INC gain from Independent		Swing		

=== 1972 ===
1972 Andhra Pradesh Legislative Assembly election: Ongole
Party	Candidate	Votes	%	±%
INC	Srungavarapu Jeevaratnam Naidu	32,154	57.42%	
CPI	Nalluri Anjaiah	20,921	37.36%	
Margin of victory		11,233	20.06%	
Turnout		57,159	60.70%	
Registered electors		94,167		
INC hold		Swing		

=== 1978 ===
1978 Andhra Pradesh Legislative Assembly election: Ongole
Party	Candidate	Votes	%	±%
INC(I)	Srungavarapu Jeevaratnam Naidu	32,574	44.97%	
JP	Balineni Venkateswara Reddy	27,494	37.96%	
Margin of victory		5,080	7.01%	
Turnout		73,705	69.47%	
Registered electors		106,100		
INC(I) gain from INC		Swing		

=== 1983 ===
1983 Andhra Pradesh Legislative Assembly election: Ongole
Party	Candidate	Votes	%	±%
TDP	Ponugupati Koteswara Rao	50,394	56.92%	
INC	Thatiparti Subba Reddy	20,546	23.21%	
Margin of victory		29,848	33.71%	
Turnout		89,776	67.99%	
Registered electors		132,046		
TDP gain from INC(I)		Swing		

=== 1985 ===
1985 Andhra Pradesh Legislative Assembly election: Ongole
Party	Candidate	Votes	%	±%
TDP	Ponugupati Koteswara Rao	53,654	53.82%	
INC	Pasupuleti Malakondaiah Naidu	44,630	44.77%	
Margin of victory		9,024	9.05%	
Turnout		100,765	68.79%	
Registered electors		146,479		
TDP hold		Swing		

=== 1989 ===
1989 Andhra Pradesh Legislative Assembly election: Ongole
Party	Candidate	Votes	%	±%
INC	Bachala Balaiah	68,704	57.93%	
TDP	Kamepalli Venkata Ramana Rao	49,214	41.49%	
Margin of victory		19,490	16.43%	
Turnout		120,586	65.25%	
Registered electors		185,229		
INC gain from TDP		Swing		

=== 1994 ===
1994 Andhra Pradesh Legislative Assembly election: Ongole
Party	Candidate	Votes	%	±%
TDP	Edara Hari Babu	53,487	50.16%	
INC	Venkateswarlu Yedlapudi	33,608	31.52%	
Margin of victory		19,879	18.64%	
Turnout		107,742	65.27%	
Registered electors		165,061		
TDP gain from INC		Swing		

=== 1999 ===
1999 Andhra Pradesh Legislative Assembly election: Ongole
Party	Candidate	Votes	%	±%
INC	Balineni Srinivasa Reddy	44,707	39.27%	
TDP	Yakkala Tulasi Rao	38,485	33.80%	
Margin of victory		6,222	5.46%	
Turnout		118144	59.65%	
Registered electors		198,048		
INC gain from TDP		Swing		

=== 2004 ===
2004 Andhra Pradesh Legislative Assembly election: Ongole
Party	Candidate	Votes	%	±%
INC	Balineni Srinivasa Reddy	72,380	58.50	+19.23
TDP	Sidda Raghava Rao	48,209	38.96	−5.16
Majority		24,171	19.54	
Turnout		123,733	69.64	+12.15
INC hold		Swing		

=== 2009 ===
2009 Andhra Pradesh state assembly elections: Ongole
Party	Candidate	Votes	%	±%
INC	Balineni Srinivasa Reddy	67,214	42.94	−15.56
TDP	Edara Hari Babu	44,300	28.26	−10.70
PRP	Anand Parvathareddy	33,716	21.54	
Majority		22,986	14.68	
Turnout		156,523	66.81	−2.83
INC hold		Swing		

2012

2012 Andhra Pradesh Legislative Assembly by-election: Ongole
Party	Candidate	Votes	%	±%
YSRCP	Balineni Srinivasa Reddy	77,222	48.80	
TDP	Damacharla Janardhana Rao	49,819	31.48	
Majority				
Turnout		1,58,238		
YSRCP gain from INC		Swing		

=== 2014 ===
2014 Andhra Pradesh Legislative Assembly election: Ongole
Party	Candidate	Votes	%	±%
TDP	Damacharla Janardhana Rao	93,025	51.29	
YSRCP	Balineni Srinivasa Reddy	80,597	44.44	
Majority		12,428	6.85	
Turnout		181,376	77.58	+10.77
TDP gain from YSRCP		Swing		

=== 2019 ===
2019 Andhra Pradesh Legislative Assembly election: Ongole
Party	Candidate	Votes	%	±%
YSRCP	Balineni Srinivasa Reddy	101,022	52.08	+7.64
TDP	Damacharla Janardhana Rao	78,777	40.61	−10.69
JSP	Sk. Reyaz	10,304	5.31	N/A
NOTA	None of the Above	1,333	0.69	N/A
Majority		22,245	11.47	+0.70
Turnout		1,93,971	TBA	TBA
YSRCP gain from TDP		Swing		

=== 2024 ===
2024 Andhra Pradesh Legislative Assembly election: Ongole
Party	Candidate	Votes	%	±%
TDP	Damacharla Janardhana Rao	118,800	56.76	
YSRCP	Balineni Srinivasa Reddy	84,774	40.5	
INC	Turakapalli Naga Lakshmi	2,067	0.99	
NOTA	None Of The Above	1,310	0.63	
Majority		34,026	16.25	
Turnout		2,09,303		
TDP gain from YSRCP		Swing		

== See also ==
- List of constituencies of Andhra Pradesh Legislative Assembly
