= Kadiri Babu Rao =

Indian politician

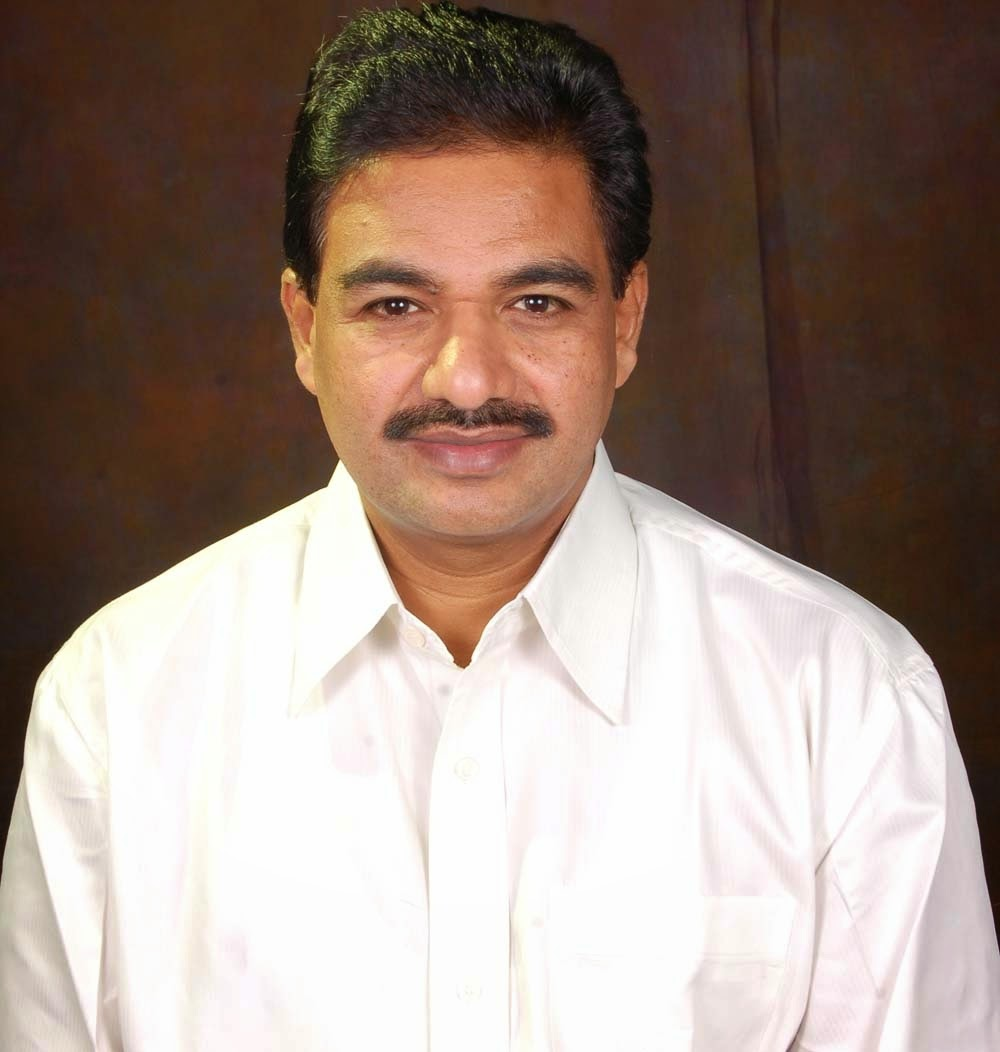
- Rao in 2016

Member of the Legislative Assembly Andhra Pradesh
- In office 2014–2019
- Preceded by: Mukku Ugra Narasimha Reddy
- Succeeded by: Burra Madhusudan Yadav
- Constituency: Kanigiri

Personal details
- Born: 10 August 1959 (age 67) Prakasam district, Andhra Pradesh, India
- Party: YSR Congress Party
- Other political affiliations: Telugu Desam Party
- Education: Nizam College
- Occupation: Politician

Kadiri Babu Rao is an Indian politician from the state of Andhra Pradesh. He was the former Member of the Legislative Assembly (MLA) for the Kanigiri Assembly constituency representing Telugu Desam Party (TDP). He began his political career in the TDP in mid 1980s and later shifted to YSR Congress Party (YSRCP) in 2020.

== Early life ==
Rao was born in Seelamvaripalli village, Prakasam district, Andhra Pradesh, to Kadiri Venkata Narasaiah, a diamond merchant. He was educated near Seelamavaripalli before his family migrated to Hyderabad. He graduated with a BA degree from Nizam college, Hyderabad in 1981.

== Career ==
Rao entered politics in 1980s and joined TDP, and developed a close association with Nandamuri Balakrishna. He aspired to contest the 2004 Andhra Pradesh Legislative Assembly election from Kanigiri constituency, however TDP fielded him from Darsi Assembly constituency, but he lost to Buchepalli Subba Reddy, Indian National Congress-backed independent contestant.

He later filed nomination to contest the 2009 Andhra Pradesh Legislative Assembly election from Kanigiri on behalf of TDP. Upon objections raised by Mukku Ugra Narasimha Reddy, Congress candidate to Kanigiri, of a missing signature of Rao on his filed affidavit, the nomination was rejected by the Election Commission of India.

He then contested the 2014 Andhra Pradesh Legislative Assembly election and won as the MLA from Kanigiri. He later strived to contest the 2019 Andhra Pradesh Legislative Assembly election again from Kanigiri. However, N. Chandrababu Naidu, TDP's president, did not facilitate it and fielded him from Darsi constituency. Despite rumours that Rao was upset over Naidu's decision and that he might contest from Kanigiri as an independent, he moved forward with Darsi constituency but lost the election to Maddisetty Venugopal of YSRCP.

After his 2019 defeat, Rao, dissatisfied over Naidu's decision, took a break from politics and TDP. Following reports of his plans to change his political alliance, he left TDP and joined YSR Congress Party in March 2020.

== Other work ==
Rao established Kadiri Babu Rao Educational Society which is used to run Kadiri Baburao College of Agriculture & Horticulture in Prakasam district.
