= Ongole Municipal Corporation =

Local civic body in Ongole, Andhra Pradesh, India

Ongole Municipal Corporation Oṅgōlu nagara pālaka Sanstha ఒంగోలు నగర పాలక సంస్థ

Type
- Type: Municipal Corporation

History
- Founded: 30 September 1876 (150 years ago)

Leadership
- Mayor: Vacant (since 18 March 2026)
- Deputy Mayor: Vacant (since 18 March 2026)
- Municipal Commissioner: M. Jaswantha Rao
- Seats: 50

Elections
- Voting system: First Past the Post
- Last election: 10 March 2021
- Next election: TBH

Website
- Ongole Municipal corporation

Ongole Municipal Corporation is the civic body that governs the city of Ongole in the Indian state of Andhra Pradesh. Ongole is identified as town on 30 September 1876.

== History ==
Initially the town population was 9,000. In early days British government officials used to setup the municipal administration. First direct elections were held in 1920.It had 16 wards at that time. First municipal chairman is Varada Sriramula Nayudu. In 2012 after the merger of 10 surrounding village it became Ongole Municipal Corporation

== Ongole’s 150th Anniversary celebrations ==
Heritage walks conducted on 27th Spetmber.

== Jurisdiction ==
Ongole Municipal Corporation

Population (census 2011) 2,32,739, Area (in square kilometres) 132.45, No. of Households 61,694, No. of Divisions 50, Length of Roads (km) 315, Length of Drains (km) 740.

== List of mayors ==
Ongole Municipal Corporation (OMC)
Sno.	Mayor	DY Mayor	Term start	Term end	Party	Notes
1.	Gangada Sujatha	Vemuri Suryanarayana; V.Madavarao	2021	2026	YSR Congress Party	First Mayor of OMC
2.	Gangada Sujatha	Vemuri Suryanarayana	2024	2026	Telugu Desam Party	

Political party	Symbol	Won	Change
YSR Congress Party		41	Steady
Telugu Desam Party		6	Steady
Independents		2	Steady
Jana Sena Party		1	Steady

== Administration ==
The corporation is administered by an elected body, headed by the Mayor. The present Municipal Commissioner is K. Venkateswara Rao

== Functions ==
Ongole Municipal Corporation is created for the following functions:

- Planning for the town including its surroundings which are covered under its Department's Urban Planning Authority .
- Approving construction of new buildings and authorising use of land for various purposes.
- Improvement of the town's economic and Social status.
- Arrangements of water supply towards commercial, residential and industrial purposes.
- Planning for fire contingencies through Fire Service Departments.
- Creation of solid waste management, public health system and sanitary services.
- Working for the development of ecological aspect like development of Urban Forestry and making guidelines for environmental protection.
- Working for the development of weaker sections of the society like mentally and physically handicapped, old age and gender biased people.
- Making efforts for improvement of slums and poverty removal in the town.

== Revenue sources ==
The following are the Income sources for the corporation from the Central and State Government.

=== Revenue from taxes ===
Following is the Tax related revenue for the corporation.

- Property tax.
- Profession tax.
- Entertainment tax.
- Grants from Central and State Government like Goods and Services Tax.
- Advertisement tax.

=== Revenue from non-tax sources ===
Following is the Non Tax related revenue for the corporation.

- Water usage charges.
- Fees from Documentation services.
- Rent received from municipal property.
- Funds from municipal bonds.

== Awards and achievements ==
In 2015, as per the Swachh Bharat Abhiyan of the Ministry of Urban Development, Ongole Municipal Corporation was ranked 357th in the country.
