= Balineni Srinivasa Reddy =

Indian politician

Minister of Energy, Forest and Environment, Science & Technology Government of Andhra Pradesh
- In office 8 June 2019 – 7 April 2022
- Governor: E. S. L. Narasimhan; Biswabhusan Harichandan
- Chief Minister: Y. S. Jagan Mohan Reddy
- Preceded by: Sidda Raghava Rao
- Succeeded by: Peddireddy Ramachandra Reddy

Minister of Mines & Geology, Handlooms & Textiles, Spinning Mills & Small Scale Industries Government of Andhra Pradesh
- In office 25 May 2009 – 2 September 2009
- Governor: N. D. Tiwari
- Chief Minister: Y. S. Rajasekhara Reddy
- Preceded by: Sabitha Indra Reddy
- Succeeded by: D. K. Aruna; Gaddam Ramprasad

Member of Legislative Assembly Andhra Pradesh
- In office 2019–2024
- Preceded by: Damacharla Janardhana Rao
- Succeeded by: Damacharla Janardhana Rao
- Constituency: Ongole
- In office 1999–2014
- Preceded by: Edara Hari Babu
- Succeeded by: Damacharla Janardhana Rao
- Constituency: Ongole

Personal details
- Born: 12 December 1964 (age 61) Ongole, Andhra Pradesh
- Party: Janasena Party (since 2024)
- Other political affiliations: YSR Congress Party (2011–2024); Indian National Congress (1999–2011)
- Spouse: Smt B. Sachi Devi
- Children: B. Praneet Reddy
- Parent: B. Venkateswara Reddy (father)
- Relatives: Y. V. Subba Reddy (brother-in-law)
- Education: Jawahar Bharati College, Kavali, Nellore district, Andhra Pradesh
- Nickname: Vasanna

Balineni Srinivasa Reddy (born 12 December 1964) is an Indian politician and five time MLA from Andhra Pradesh. He is currently a member of the Janasena Party. He previously represented the Ongole Assembly constituency for five terms.

== Early life ==
Reddy was born in Ongole, Andhra Pradesh, India. He is the son of B.Venkateswara Reddy. He married Sachi Devi, sister of ex MP Y. V. Subba Reddy and has a son B. Praneeth Reddy. He is a relative of former Chief Ministers Y. S. Rajasekhara Reddy and Y. S. Jagan Mohan Reddy.

== Political career ==
He served as a Minister for Energy, Environment, Forest, Science & Technology in 2019 to 2023. He also served as a Minister for Handlooms & Textiles, Spinning Mills and Small Scale Industries in 2009. He was elected as an MLA from Ongole Assembly Constituency continuously four times in 1999, 2004, 2009 and 2012. In the 2004 Andhra Pradesh Legislative Assembly Election he defeated Sidda Raghava Rao of TDP by a margin of 24,171 votes. Later in 2009, he defeated Edara Hari Babu, also of TDP. After winning three times on Indian National Congress ticket he joined YSR Congress Party in 2012. He lost in 2014 to Damacharla Janardhana Rao of Telugu Desam Party but won the 2019 Andhra Pradesh Legislative Assembly Election on YSRCP ticket defeating Rao of TDP by a margin of 22,245 votes. In 2024 Andhra Pradesh Legislative Assembly elections, contested from YSRCP and lost in Ongole Assembly Constituency against Damacharla Janardhana Rao.

He was the president of the YSR Congress Party, Prakasam District. He also served as the YSR Congress Regional Coordinator for Ongole, Bapatla, Nellore, Tirupathi and YSR districts.

In September 2024, he quit YSRCP to join Janasena Party.
