= Mukku Kasi Reddy =

Indian politician

Shri. Palaparthi David Raju

Chairman of Prakasam Zilla Praja Parishad
- In office 2001–2006
- Preceded by: David Raju Palaparthi
- Constituency: Yerragondapalem

Member of Andhra Pradesh Legislative Assembly
- In office 1994–1999
- Preceded by: Erigineni Thirupathi Naidu
- Succeeded by: Erigineni Thirupathi Naidu
- Constituency: Kanigiri
- In office 1983–1989
- Preceded by: Buthalapalli Ramasubba Reddy
- Succeeded by: Erigineni Thirupathi Naidu
- Constituency: Kanigiri

Personal details
- Born: 7 May 1958 Mattigunta village, Naguluppalapadu, Prakasam district, Andhra Pradesh, India
- Died: 25 August 2024 (aged 66) Hyderabad, Telangana, India
- Citizenship: Indian
- Party: Telugu Desam Party
- Parent: George
- Occupation: Politician

Mukku Kasi Reddy is an Indian politician from Kanigiri constituency of Andhra Pradesh. He has started his political career in 1983 as a Member of the Legislative Assembly (India) from Telugu Desam Party and served as Sericulture Minister in NTR’s first Cabinet. He has represented Kanigiri constituency as a Member of the Legislative Assembly (India) 3 times in 1983, 1985, 1994. In 2001, he has won the Zilla Parishad Election and served as ZP Chairman for Prakasam District until 2006. In 2009, he quit the Telugu Desam Party.

In 2010, he joined the YSR Congress Party headed by Y.S. Jagan Mohan Reddy.
