= Nuzendla =

- Village
- Interactive map of Nuzendla
- Location in Andhra Pradesh, India
- Coordinates: 15°59′35″N 79°42′29″E
- Country: India
- State: Andhra Pradesh
- District: Palnadu
- Mandal: Nuzendla

Government
  - Type: Panchayati raj
  - Body: Nuzendla gram panchayat

Area
  - Total: 2,431 ha (6,010 acres)

Population (2011)
  - Total: 5,541
  - Density: 227.9/km^{2} (590.3/sq mi)

Languages
  - Official: Telugu
- Time zone: UTC+5:30 (IST)
- PIN: 522xxx
- Area code: +91–
- Vehicle registration: AP

Nuzendla is a village in Palnadu district of the Indian state of Andhra Pradesh. It is located in Nuzendla mandal of Narasaraopet revenue division.

== Geography ==
Gundlakamma stream is the source of water for the village.

== Governance ==
Nuzendla gram panchayat is the local self-government of the village. It is divided into wards and each ward is represented by a ward member.

== Education ==
As per the school information report for the academic year 2018–19, the village has a total of 8 schools and 2 colleges. These include one model, one KGBV, one private and 5 Zilla Parishad/Mandal Parishad schools. and as well as one intermediate and one degree college.
