= Mukku Ugra Narasimha Reddy =

Indian politician (born 1974)

Member of Legislative Assembly Andhra Pradesh
- Incumbent
- Assumed office 2024
- Preceded by: Burra Madhu Sudhan Yadav
- Constituency: Kanigiri
- In office 2009–2014
- Preceded by: Erigineni Thirupathi Naidu
- Succeeded by: Kadiri Babu Rao
- Constituency: Kanigiri

Personal details
- Born: 8 February 1974 (age 52) Prakasam district, Andhra Pradesh, India
- Party: Telugu Desam Party
- Other political affiliations: Indian National Congress
- Occupation: Politician

Mukku Ugra Narasimha Reddy (born 8 February 1974) is an Indian politician from Andhra Pradesh. He is a member of the Andhra Pradesh Legislative Assembly from Kanigiri Assembly constituency in Prakasam district. He represents Telugu Desam Party and won the 2024 Andhra Pradesh Legislative Assembly election where TDP had an alliance with BJP and Jana Sena Party.

== Early life and education ==
Reddy is from Kanigiri, Prakasam district, Andhra Pradesh. His father, Chinna Narasa Reddy Mukku, was a former sarpanch and his mother, Rattamma, was a former ZPTC member. He and his wife are doctors. He completed his MBBS in 2000 at JJM Medical College, Davanagere which is affiliated with Rajiv Gandhi University of Health Sciences.

== Career ==
Reddy started his political journey with the Youth wing of the Indian National Congress in early 2000. He was first elected as a Congress MLA winning the 2009 Andhra Pradesh Legislative Assembly election. He polled 60,161 votes and defeated his closest opponent, Sunkari Madhu Sudhana Rao, an independent candidate, by a margin of 2,935 votes.

He became the Prakasam district Congress committee president in 2015. In 2019, he joined Telugu Desam Party. He won the 2024 Andhra Pradesh Legislative Assembly election from Kanigiri Assembly constituency representing Telugu Desam Party. In 2024, he polled 107,045 and defeated his nearest rival, Daddala Narayana Yadav of the YSR Congress Party, by a margin of 14,604 votes.
