= Maddisetty Venugopal =

Indian politician

Maddisetty Venugopal Rao (born 1967) is an Indian politician from Andhra Pradesh. He is an MLA of YSR Congress Party from Darsi Assembly Constituency in Prakasam District. He won the 2019 Andhra Pradesh Legislative Assembly Election.

== Early life and education ==
Venugopal is born in Laxinarsimhapuram village of Pamuru Mandal, Prakasam District. His father's name is Srinivasulu. He did his MBA from Newport University, Bangalore in 1994. He is an entrepreneur who started the PACE group of companies.

== Career ==
He started his political career with Praja Rajyam Party. Later, he shifted to YSRCP and won the 2019 Andhra Pradesh Legislative Assembly Election defeating Kadiri Baburao of Telugu Desam Party by a margin of 39,057 votes. He worked for the region which has seen development in his tenure. However, Venugopal was dropped for the 2024 Assembly Election.
