= Ongole =

District Headquarters of Prakasam dt

Ongole Ongolu
- City
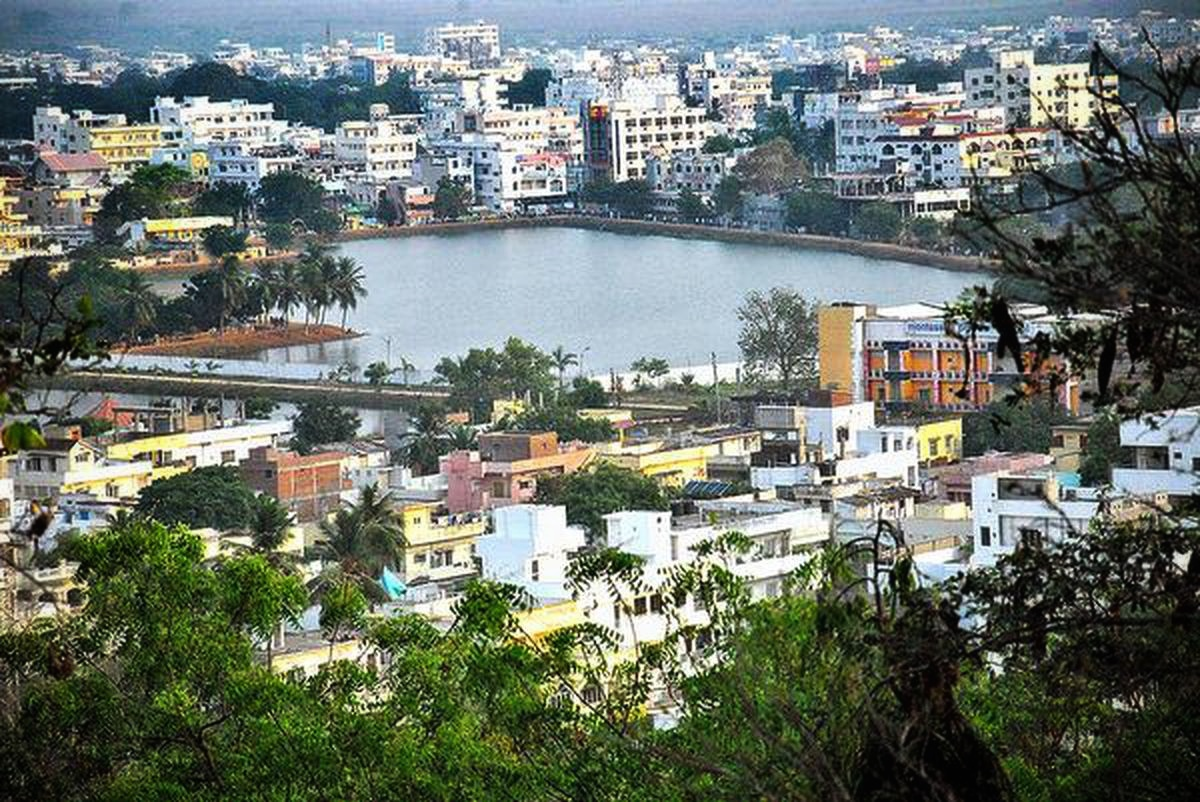
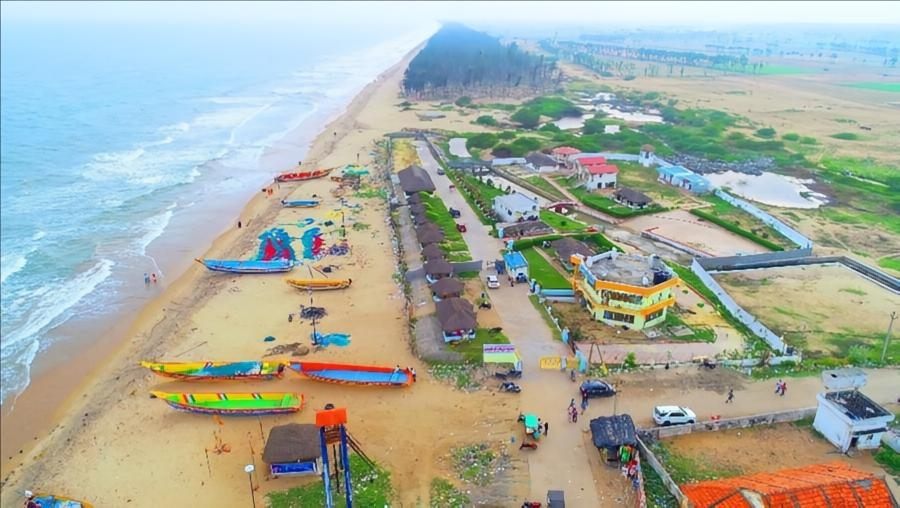
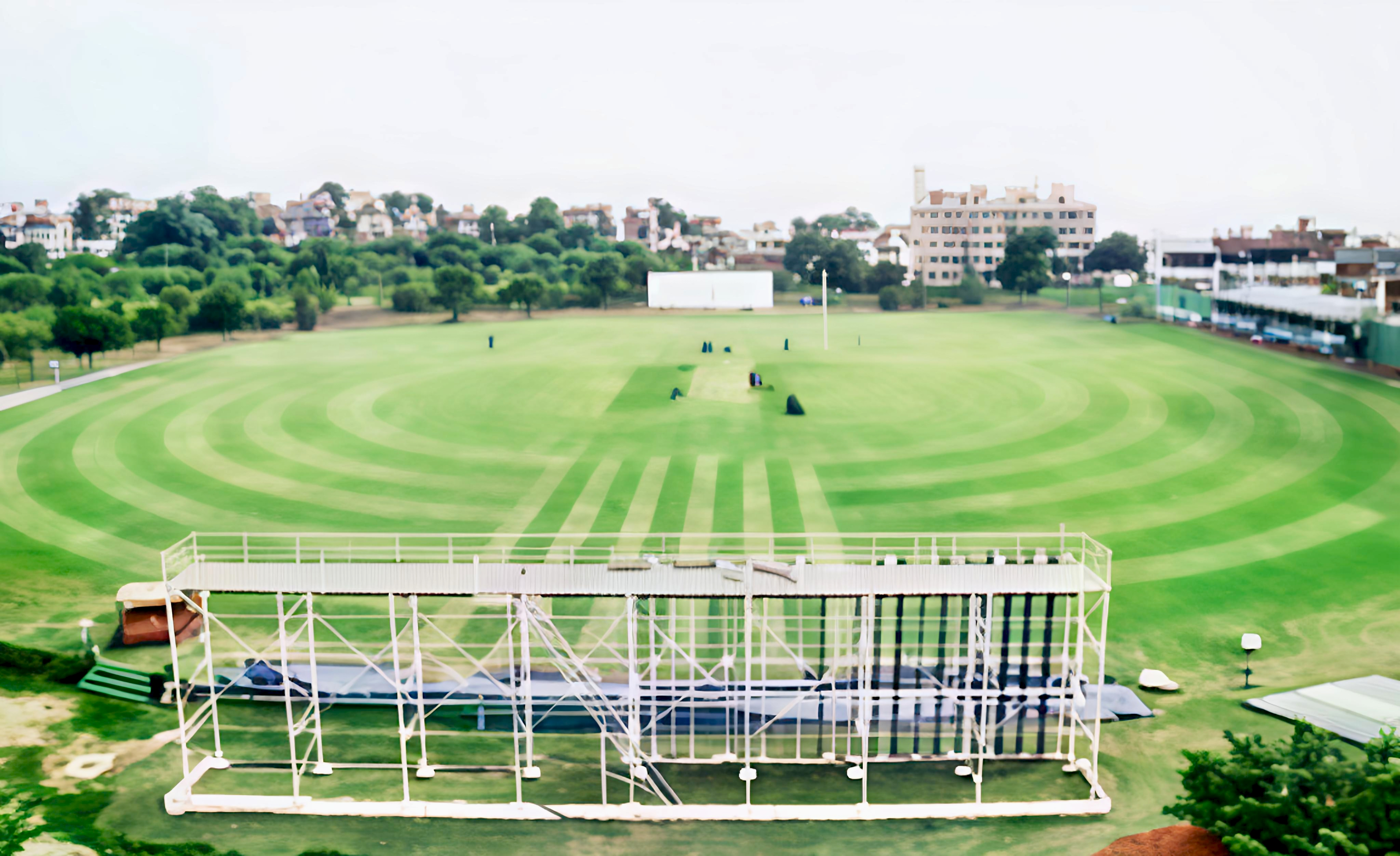
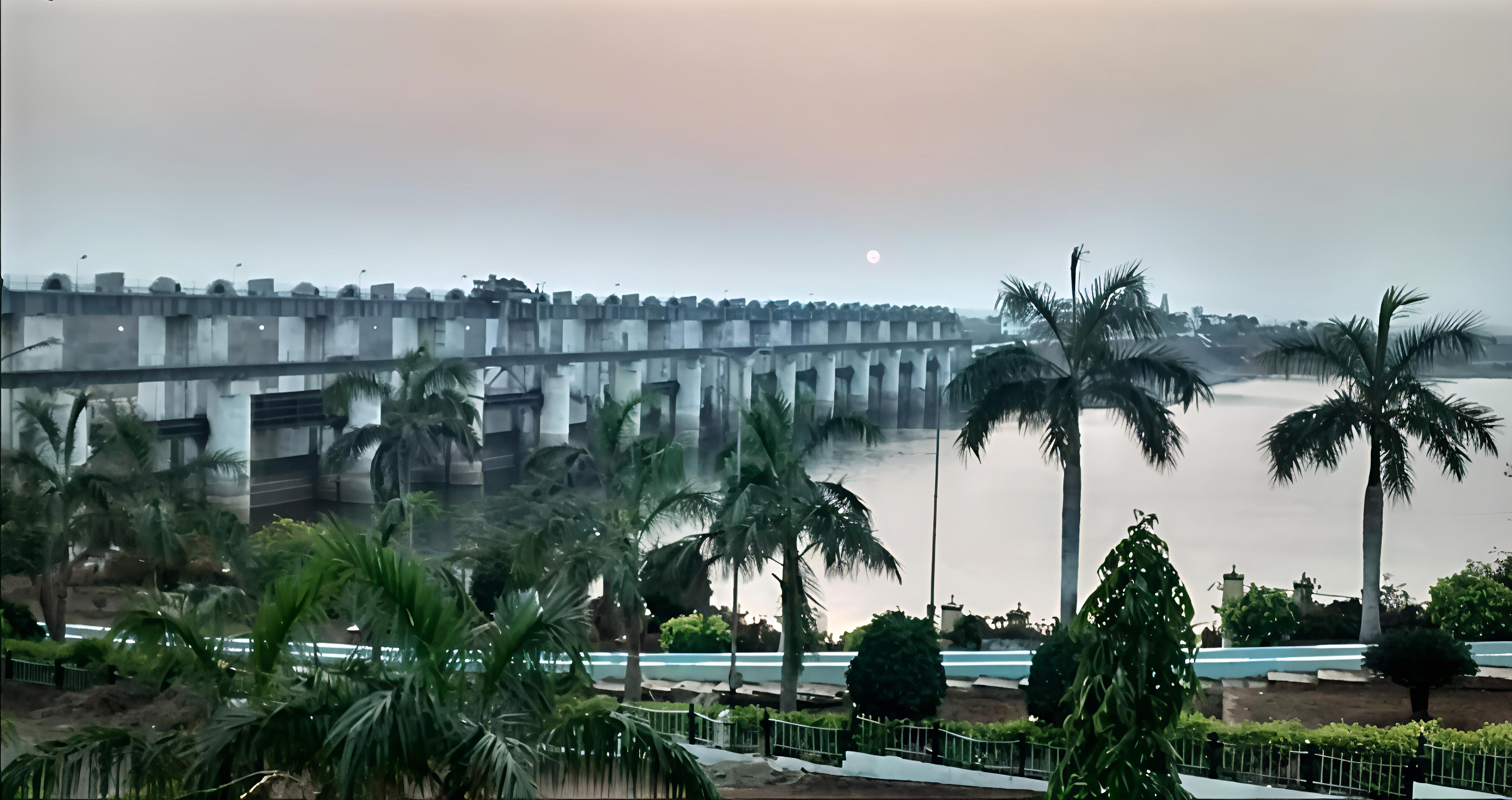
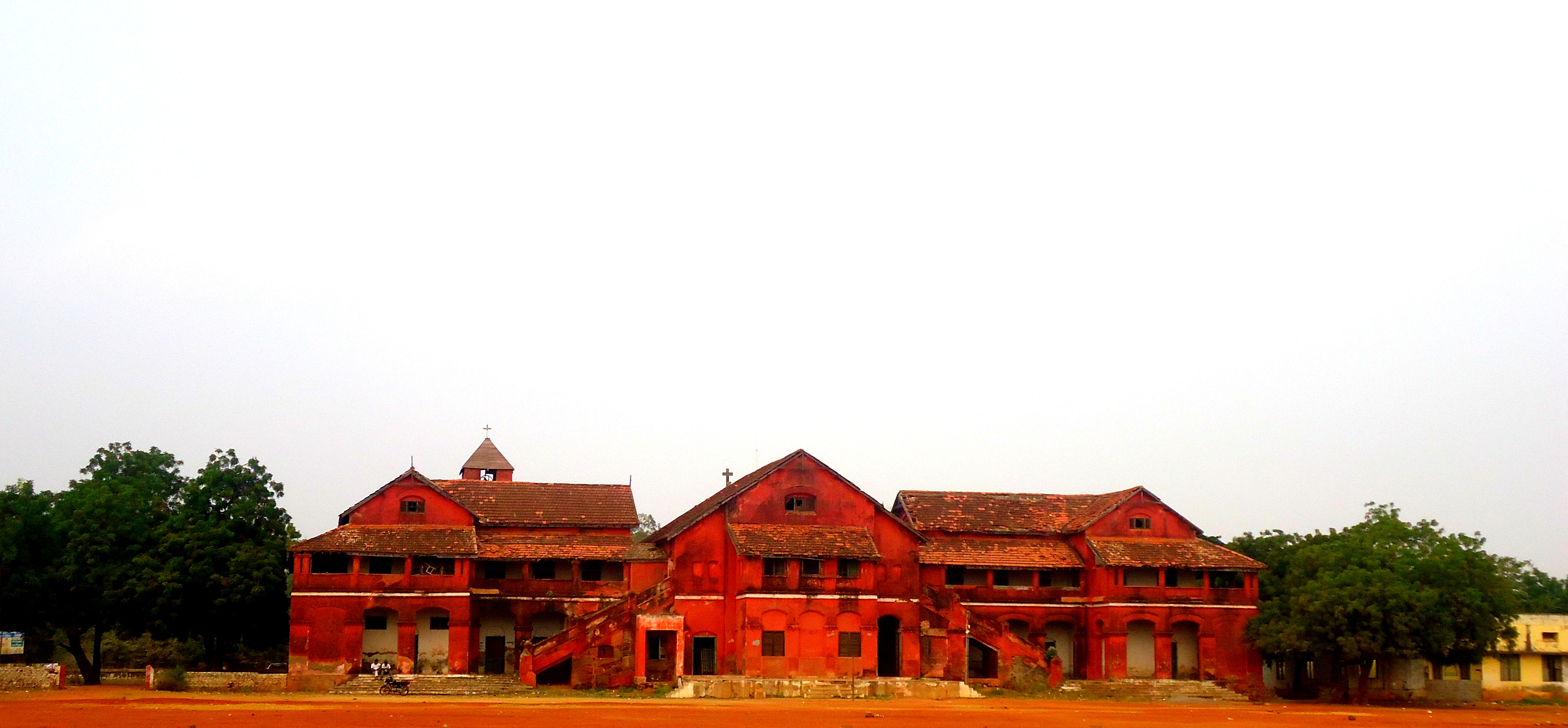
- Ongole Aerial View, Kothapatnam Beach, CSR Sarma Ground, Mallavaram Dam, ABM Junior College
- Interactive map of Ongole
- Location in Andhra Pradesh, India
- Coordinates: 15.506°N 80.049°E
- Country: India
- State: Andhra Pradesh
- District: Prakasam
- Incorporated (Municipality): 1876
- Incorporated (Corporation): 25 January 2012
- Wards: 50

Government
  - Type: Mayor–Council
  - Body: Ongole Municipal Corporation
  - MLAs: Damacharla Janardhana Rao, (Telugu Desam Party)
  - MP: Magunta Sreenivasulu Reddy, (Telugu Desam Party)
  - Municipal commissioner: Kanthamaneni Sakunthala

Area
  - Total: 132.45 km^{2} (51.14 sq mi)

Population (2011)
  - Total: 252,739
  - Density: 1,908.2/km^{2} (4,942.2/sq mi)
  - Households: 51,768
- Households

Literacy
  - Literates: 153,628
  - Literacy rate: 83.04%

Languages
  - Official: Telugu
- Time zone: UTC+5:30 (IST)
- PIN: 523001, 523002, 523286
- Area code: +91–8592
- Vehicle registration: AP
- Website: ongole.cdma.ap.gov.in

Ongole (Telugu pronunciation: [oŋɡoːlu]), natively known as Ongolu, is a city in Prakasam district of the Indian state of Andhra Pradesh. It is the headquarters of Prakasam district. It is known for Ongole cattle, an indigenous breed of oxen.

== Etymology ==
The name "Ongole" is believed to be derived from the word "Vangaprolu," which later evolved into "Vangavolu," and then to modern "Ongolu." Prōlu meant "town" in Old Telugu.

== History ==
The city's history dates back to 230 BCE, with the era of the Mauryas and Satavahanas, who ruled most of what is now Andhra Pradesh. A few inscriptions dating to the Satavahana period have been found in Chinaganjam, a village near Ongole. According to the historical inscriptions found at the Sri Raja Rajeswara Swami Temple complex, the city was founded by the Cholas. Ongole was also mentioned in the inscriptions of the Pallava rulers pertaining to the third and fourth century CE. The city was also ruled over by Krishna Deva Raya. This place returned into the limelight during the Kakatiya dynasty, where the nearby towns of Motupalli and Vodarevu served as significant seaports. The final Indian dynasty to rule over the Ongole region, prior to the British, was the Mandapati dynasty (zamindars).

The Kaasi Visweswara Swami, Chenna Kesava Swami, and Veeranjaneya Swami temples were constructed in the early 17th century by King Vankayalapati mantri and his army general.

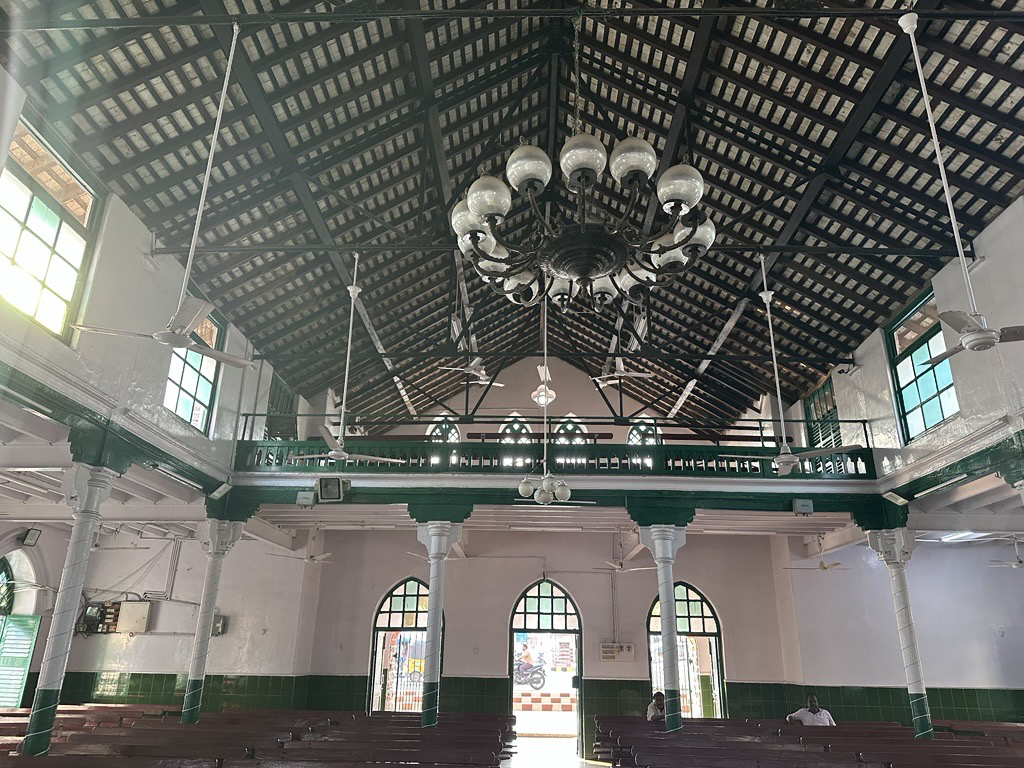
Jewett Memorial Baptist Church built in 1866

The oldest educational institution in the city, the Andhra Baptist Mission High School, was established in the late 19th century by American Baptist missionaries. Jewett Memorial Baptist Church was built in 1866.

Ongole district came into existence on 2 February 1970, carving out portions of Markapur revenue division from Kurnool, Ongole revenue division from Guntur, and Kandukur revenue division from Nellore districts. It was renamed Prakasam district in 1972, in memory of freedom fighter, later Chief Minister of the composite Madras State and the first Chief Minister of Andhra Pradesh, Tanguturi Prakasam. Tangaturi was born in Vinodarayunipalem, a hamlet of Kanuparthi village, located in Naguluppalapadu mandal of the same district.

== Geography ==
Ongole is located at 15.5°N 80.05°E. It has an average elevation of 10 m (33 ft) AMSL and is situated on plains. The city is around 149 kilometres (93 mi) to the southwest of Amaravati, the state capital.

=== Climate ===
Summer temperatures reach as high as 44 °C (111 °F) between March and May. The city receives a lot of rain in the monsoons. The annual average rainfall is approximately 794.5 mm. Winter months are typically dry, with little to no rainfall. The average annual temperature is 24.5 °C (76.1 °F). Cyclones occur more commonly between October and December.

Climate data for Ongole (1991–2020, extremes 1944–2020)
Month	Jan	Feb	Mar	Apr	May	Jun	Jul	Aug	Sep	Oct	Nov	Dec	Year
Record high °C (°F)	36.5 (97.7)	38.3 (100.9)	43.3 (109.9)	44.7 (112.5)	47.4 (117.3)	47.2 (117.0)	41.8 (107.2)	40.2 (104.4)	41.0 (105.8)	39.5 (103.1)	36.2 (97.2)	33.9 (93.0)	47.4 (117.3)
Mean daily maximum °C (°F)	30.9 (87.6)	32.5 (90.5)	34.7 (94.5)	36.4 (97.5)	39.8 (103.6)	38.0 (100.4)	35.7 (96.3)	35.0 (95.0)	34.8 (94.6)	33.3 (91.9)	31.5 (88.7)	30.8 (87.4)	34.4 (93.9)
Mean daily minimum °C (°F)	20.3 (68.5)	21.8 (71.2)	24.1 (75.4)	26.3 (79.3)	28.2 (82.8)	28.1 (82.6)	27.0 (80.6)	26.5 (79.7)	26.0 (78.8)	24.9 (76.8)	22.7 (72.9)	20.7 (69.3)	24.7 (76.5)
Record low °C (°F)	14.0 (57.2)	14.4 (57.9)	17.5 (63.5)	19.4 (66.9)	16.1 (61.0)	22.4 (72.3)	21.2 (70.2)	21.3 (70.3)	21.3 (70.3)	18.3 (64.9)	16.2 (61.2)	15.1 (59.2)	14.0 (57.2)
Average rainfall mm (inches)	13.1 (0.52)	5.2 (0.20)	9.2 (0.36)	17.7 (0.70)	58.7 (2.31)	61.6 (2.43)	84.2 (3.31)	121.0 (4.76)	145.8 (5.74)	225.9 (8.89)	156.2 (6.15)	24.9 (0.98)	923.5 (36.36)
Average rainy days	0.9	0.8	0.2	0.8	2.2	3.7	6.4	7.4	6.7	8.5	5.6	1.7	44.8
Average relative humidity (%) (at 17:30 IST)	60	57	57	60	51	47	51	55	61	68	68	63	58
Source: India Meteorological Department

Ongole has been ranked the seventeenth best “National Clean Air City” under (Category 3 population under 3 lakhs cities) in India.

== Demographics ==
According to the 2011 Census of India, the city had a population of 252,739. The sex ratio of 994 females per 1000 males is higher than the national average of 940 per 1000. 19,744 children are in the age group of 0–6 years, of which 10,228 are boys and 9,516 are girls, with a ratio of 935 per 1000. The average literacy rate stands at 83.04% with 153,628 literates, significantly higher than the state average of 67.41%.

== Governance ==
Ongole Municipal Corporation

=== Civic administration and politics ===
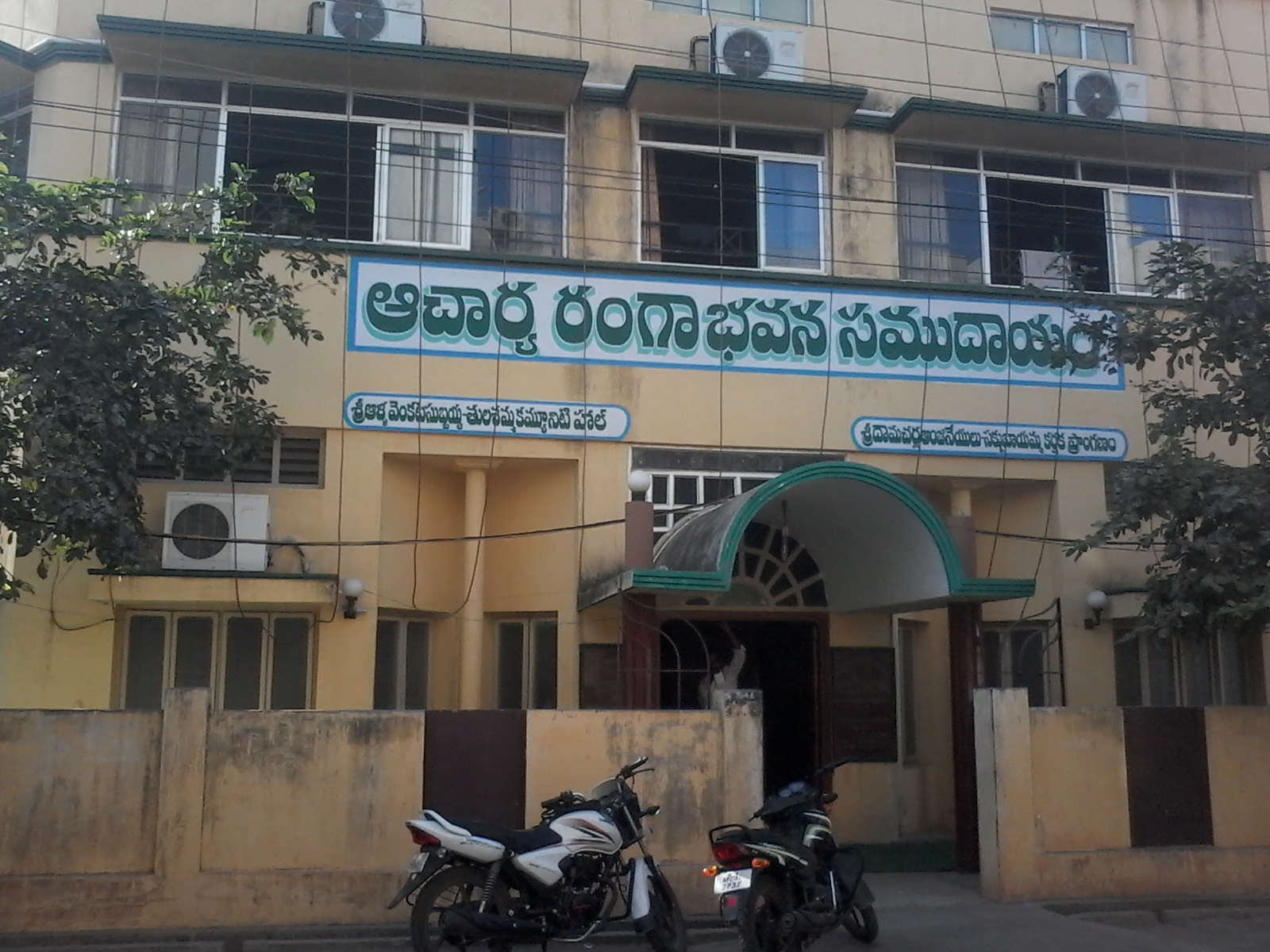
Community Hall, Ongole

It is constituted as a municipality in 1876, and was upgraded to a municipal corporation on 25 January 2012. The jurisdiction of the corporation is spread over an area of 132.45 km^{2} (51.14 mi^{2}), with 50 election wards. The agglomerated villages that were merged into Ongole corporation were: Cheruvukommupalem, Throvagunta, Muktinuthalapadu, Dasarajupalli, Koppolu, Narasapuram Agraharam, Pellur, Pernamitta, and Vengamukkapalem.

The city is part of Ongole assembly constituency and Ongole Lok Sabha constituency. Damacharla Janardhan Rao is the current MLA of the constituency, pertaining to the Telugu Desam Party. The constituency is a part of Ongole (Lok Sabha constituency) which was won by Magunta Sreenivasulu Reddy of the Telugu Desam Party.

== Economy ==
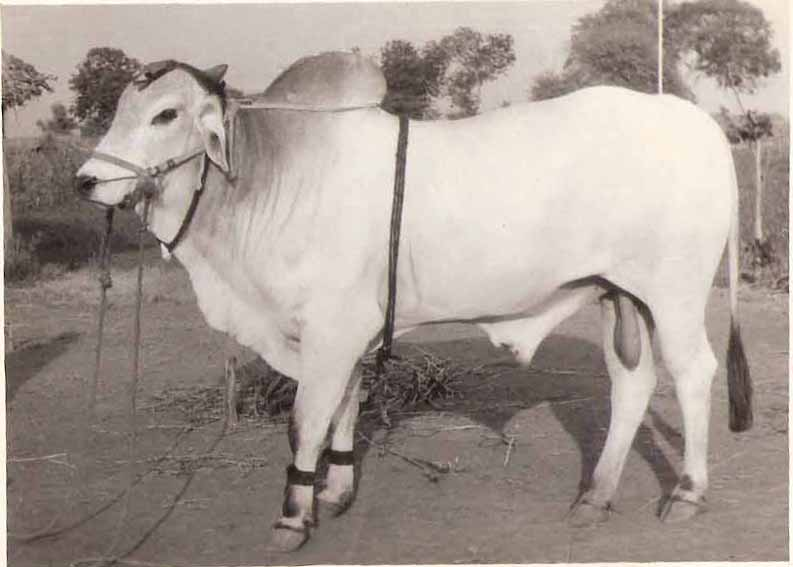
The Ongole Bull (Ongole Gittha)

Agriculture is the primary industry of Ongole. The city is a major center for tobacco trading in Andhra Pradesh.

Ongole bulls are a breed of oxen that are exported to many countries. The Brahman bull in the United States, is an off breed of the Ongole. Ongole Island, in Malaysia, holds many Ongole oxen. The population of Zebu off-breed descended animals in Brazil, which contain a large Ongole component, was over 100 million in 1995. The original breed of Ongole stud bulls are found in a small region around Ongole town between the Gundlakamma and Musi rivers.

== Transport ==
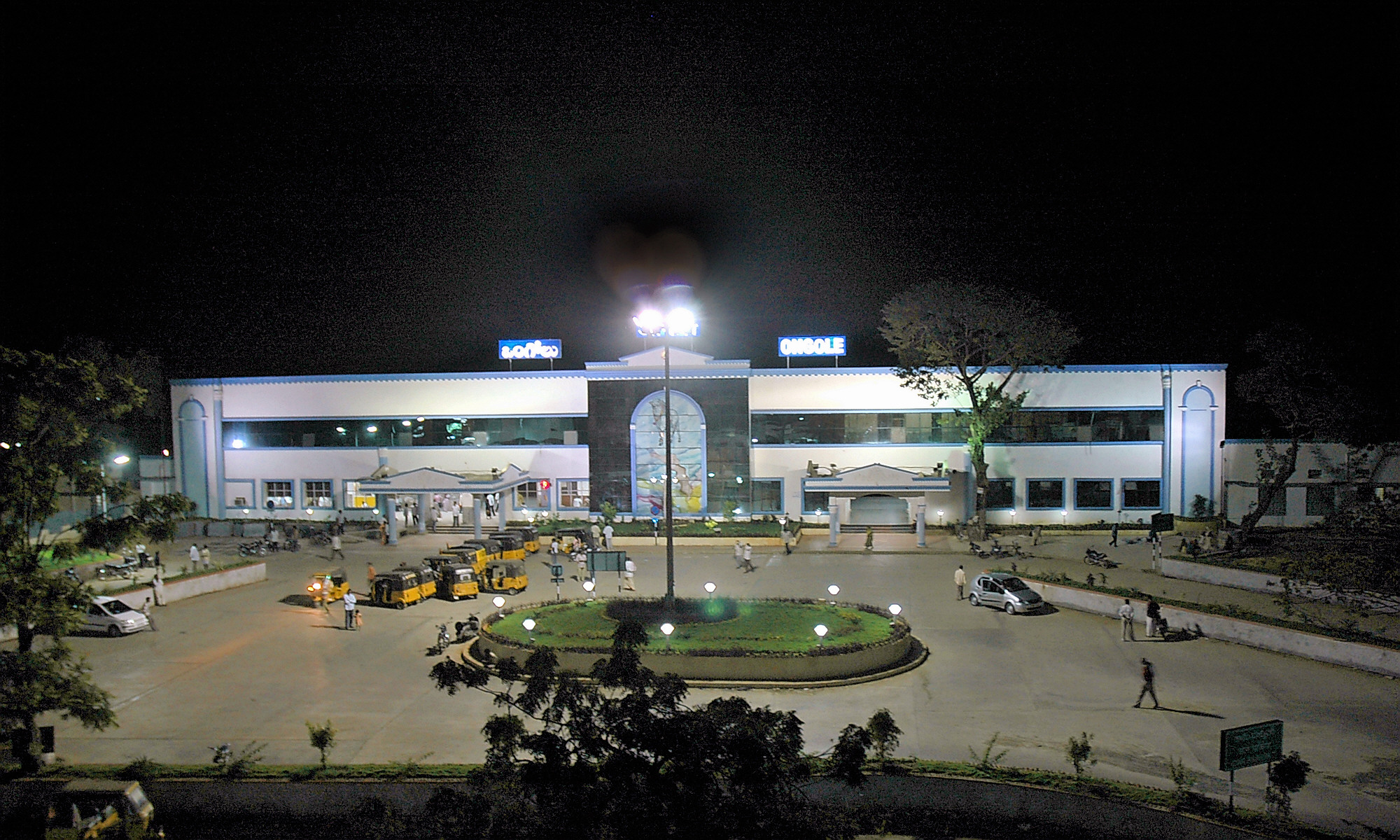
Ongole railway station

National Highway 16, a part of Golden Quadrilateral highway network, bypasses the city. National Highway 216 connects the city with Kathipudi. The city has a total road length of 738.50 kilometres (458.88 mi). Ongole bus station is owned and operated by the Andhra Pradesh State Road Transport Corporation. The station is also equipped with a bus depot. The 'Passengers Delight Oroject' was implemented at the bus station for improving cleanliness and modernizing it.

Ongole railway station was established as part of Nellore - Krishna Canal section on 20 December 1898 by the Madras and Southern Mahratta Railway System. It is categorized as a Non-Suburban Grade-3 (NSG-3) station in the Vijayawada railway division.

== Education ==
Education is imparted through government and private institutions. Several aided schools decided to become private schools or close down after transferring the staff to the government, when the government decided to stop giving aid. English became the medium of instruction for primary schools in the academic year 2020–21.

Some of the famous educational institutes include Rajiv Gandhi Institute of Medical Sciences (RIMS), QIS College of Engineering and Technology, QIS Institute of Technology, RISE Groups of Institutions, Indira Priyadarshini Law College, Prakasam Engineering College, and the Pace Institute of Technology and Sciences.

The city is the headquarters of Andhra Kesari University, a public university established on 11 January 2022.

== Sports ==
The PDCA-CSR Sarma College Ground is one of the home grounds of the Andhra cricket team, with a first-class cricket status and hosts Ranji Trophy matches. The ground has recorded the first ever triple century by a wicket keeper in Ranji Trophy, achieved by Srikar Bharat of the Andhra cricket team. The police parade grounds hosted the first state-level Girl Football Tournament in October 2016.

== Tourism ==
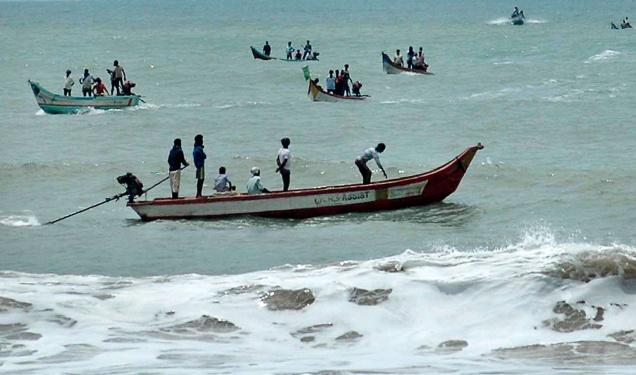
Boats near Kothapatnam beach

Multiple places of tourist interest include: Kothapatnam beach (approx. 17 kilometres (11 mi) away), Valluramma temple at Valluru (about 11 km away) and the Gundlakamma Reservoir Project at Mallavaram (approx. 20 km away.)

== Sister cities ==
Ongole is twinned with:

- Uberaba, Brazil

== See also ==
- List of cities in Andhra Pradesh by population
- List of municipal corporations in Andhra Pradesh
