= Mundlamuru =

- Village
- Interactive map of Mundlamuru
- Location in Andhra Pradesh, India Mundlamuru (India)
- Coordinates: 15°48′01″N 79°50′22″E
- Country: India
- State: Andhra Pradesh
- District: Prakasam

Languages
  - Official: Telugu
- Time zone: UTC+5:30 (IST)
- PIN: 523265
- Vehicle registration: AP

Mundlamuru is a village in Prakasam district of the Indian state of Andhra Pradesh. It is the mandal headquarters of Mundlamuru mandal in Kandukur revenue division. Under Darsi constituency and Ongole parliament
