= Kurichedu =

- Village
- Interactive map of Kurichedu
- Location in Andhra Pradesh, India Kurichedu (India)
- Coordinates: 15.9°N 79.5833°E
- Country: India
- State: Andhra Pradesh
- District: Prakasam
- Mandal: Kurichedu
- Named for: Farming

Population (2021 estimates)
  - Total: Mandal population will be more than 60 thousand.

Languages
  - Official: Telugu
- Time zone: UTC+5:30 (IST)
- PIN: 523304
- Telephone code: 08408
- Vehicle registration: AP
- Website: https://kurichedu.com

Kurichedu is a Mandal headquarters in Prakasam district of the Indian state of Andhra Pradesh. It is the mandal headquarters of Kurichedu mandal in Addanki Revenue Division.

Kurichedu has it all. With opportunities for growth, it is the largest Mandal in the Darsi constituency after Darsi itself. Plus, it's situated near the Nagarjuna Sagar Right Canal.

It is on the state highway, which comes from Darsi and connects to Vinukonda.

Kurichedu also hosts one good railway station which is fully electrified with double line capability.

The nearest big town is Darsi (about 18 km).

Kurichedu also growing rapidly with respect to real estate development, education facilities, and health facilities.

Education - Facilities

1. YRZP High School

2. Kasturba School

3. AP Model School - Newly Constructed.

Health -

1. Government Hospital

2. Few other Private Hospitals

Farming-

Kandi, Cotton, Mirchi and Tobacco.
