= Luo Tianyi =

Chinese Vocaloid synthesizer

- The package for Luo Tianyi
- Developer: Shanghai Henian Information Technology
- Release: July 12, 2012; 14 years ago
- Operating system: Windows
- Platform: PC
- Available in: Mandarin Chinese and Japanese
- Type: Vocal Synthesizer Application
- License: Proprietary
- Website: www.vsinger.com

Luo Tianyi (Chinese: 洛天依; pinyin: Luò Tiānyī) is a Chinese Vocaloid developed formerly by Bplats, Inc. under the Yamaha Corporation, and was created in collaboration with Shanghai Henian Information Technology. She was released for the Vocaloid 3, Vocaloid 4 and Vocaloid 5 engines. Her voice is provided by the Chinese voice actress Shan Xin. Considered China's most popular virtual idol, she held a joint concert with pianist Lang Lang at the Shanghai's Mercedes-Benz Arena in March 2019.

== Development ==
To create strong support for the first Chinese Vocaloid, a contest was held to pick the most popular design. The winning entry would become a Vocaloid, while the runner up entries were included in the Vocaloid promotions.

The winner of the contest was named Yayin Gongyu (雅音宫羽; Yǎyīn Gōngyǔ) and their entry became Tianyi's design. The first song by Luo Tianyi was "Step on Your Heart" (心印; Xīn Yìn).

=== Additional software ===
On April 2, 2012, Shan Xin confirmed that she had just finished her second day of recording the voicebank and mentioned that she had done an interview with Japanese reporters. According to her report, she recorded in the "Japanese way", which led to a fan asking if it would be a Japanese or Chinese voicebank. Shan Xin responded by stating to wait for the announcement. Her Japanese voicebank was not yet finished at the time of Yanhe's development. However, they mentioned that they hoped to have her released soon. Later, in November 2013, it was confirmed the vocal was cancelled.

Tianyi's Vocaloid 4 production was officially announced on March 12, 2016. Her original vocal would be improved, and it was confirmed that she would be receiving at least one additional vocal. However, the name of it was not revealed at the time, and it was unknown if she was receiving any more vocals. She was eventually released on December 30, 2017, with two voicebanks, "Meng" (萌; Méng; 'moe'; normal) and "Ning" (凝; Níng; 'solid'; power), along with two Japanese voicebanks released on May 18, 2018, "Normal" and "Sweet".

An updated Vocaloid 5 voicebank was released in February 2023, together with updated versions of Yuezheng Ling and Yanhe.

== Characteristics ==
She has a pet called "Tian Dian" (天钿; 天鈿; Tiān Diàn), and according to her biography, is an angel sent to bring happiness via music to the world, like the Vocaloids of the past.

Luo Tianyi has also been co-opted as youth ambassador of the Chinese Communist Youth League.

Name	Luo Tianyi
Age	15
Height	156 cm / 5 ft 1 in
Appearance	Grey hair, green eyes, wearing a green jasper around her neck, and a Chinese knot on her waist.
Reference color	Sky blue ( #66CCFF)

== Major offline performances ==
On February 2, 2016, Tianyi was invited to perform for the Little New Year Gala held by Hunan Satellite TV and sang the song "Huaer Naji" (花儿纳吉; Huā'ér Nàjí) with Yang Yuying. In the performance, Tianyi's figure was shown to the audience with the help of augmented reality. It was also her first performance on TV.

On June 17, 2017, Tianyi and five other virtual singers (Yanhe, Yuezheng Ling, Yuezheng Longya, Zhiyu Moke and Mo Qingxian) held a concert at the Mercedes-Benz Arena in Shanghai. Henian used holography to show their figures. It was the first concert that was specially held for Chinese virtual figures.

On New Year's Eve of 2018, Tianyi participated in the New Year's Eve Gala of Jiangsu Television. She sang the song "Let It Go" with the Taiwanese singer Wakin Chau.

In March 2018, Tianyi appeared on China Central Television for the first time and performed with the Peking opera singer Wang Peiyu.

On November 3, 2018, the concert "Guofeng Jile Ye" (国风极乐夜; Guófēng Jílè Yè; 'National-Style Blissful Night') was held at the Beijing National Stadium, where Tianyi sang the opening song of the concert.

On December 31, 2018, Tianyi performed for Jiangsu Television's New Year Gala for the second time. This time she sang the song "Dalabengba" (达拉崩吧; Dálābēngba) with Joker Xue.

On February 23, 2019, Tianyi and the pianist Lang Lang held a joint concert at the Mercedes-Benz Arena in Shanghai.

On May 16, 2019, Tianyi appeared on Zhejiang Television's The Treasured Voice and sang "Mangzhong" (芒种; Mángzhòng; 'Grain In Ear') together with Angela Chang.

On October 5, 2024, Tianyi held the concert "Gexing Yuzhou: Wuxian Gongming" (歌行宇宙·无限共鸣; Gēxíng Yúzhòu·Wúxiàn Gòngmíng).

== See also ==
- List of Vocaloid products
