= Yuezheng Ling =

Vocaloid 3 voice library released in 2015

- Yuezheng Ling package
- Developers: Shanghai Henian Information Technology Co. Ltd. VSinger
- Release: July 17, 2015; 11 years ago
- Operating system: Windows
- Platform: PC
- Available in: Chinese (Mandarin)
- Type: Vocal Synthesizer Application
- License: Proprietary
- Website: vsinger.com/vsinger/#yuezhengling

Yuezheng Ling (Chinese: 乐正绫; pinyin: Yuèzhèng Líng) is a Chinese vocaloid created by Shanghai Henian Information Technology Co. Ltd and was released for Vocaloid 3.

== Development ==
To create strong support for the first Chinese Vocaloid, a contest was held to pick the most popular design. The winning entry would become a Vocaloid, while the runner up entries were included in the Vocaloid promotions. Yuezheng Ling was one of the runner up entries and appeared alongside Luo Tianyi in several animated shorts.

However, soon after Luo Tianyi was released, Shanghai Henian Information Technology Co. Ltd lost the rights to produce Vocaloids ending the Vocaloid China project. In March 2014, Shanghai Henian repurchased the character rights for all of the Vocaloid China cast members and relaunched the project as Vocanese.

Later, Vocanese confirmed that they had previously contacted some voice actresses and considered them to be less risky and had better efficiency. However, they refused to ignore any other potential voices for their new vocal, thus the audition was launched. In another response, Shanghai Henian stated that the participants' voices would be posted on the official Ling Weibo page.

On October 15, 2014, the winner was revealed to be Qi Inory and recording for two vocals began, one of which being the vocal of Ling. On November 20, Vocanese confirmed that even though Vocaloid 4 was revealed, they were still going to release Ling for Vocaloid 3.

An updated Vocaloid 5 version was released in February 2023.

== Characteristics ==
According to the short animation series promoting Vocaloid China, Ling is a lively high school student. Her family runs the huge Yuezheng Group, a business that makes instruments and music. Her personality is very straight forward and can sometimes be seen as blunt as she does not care for details. She is extremely generous and energetic, for she spends 3/4 of the day running all over the place and sometimes, her high spirit causes boys to become jealous. She loves music, experiencing new things, and huge, fluffy dolls. However, Ling has many annoying issues in her life, mostly related to her older brother, Yuezheng Longya.

At Firefly Con 2015, additional traits and biographical information were added for Ling. It was also added that she is a fashionable rich girl and it was noted that the Vsinger cast were given official birthdays to allow them to have their own unique birthdays rather than having them all in July. It would also allow fans to be able to celebrate each of them easily.

It was explained that the additional information was catered to roleplayers. The day after, Henian responded that they added the extra biography in an attempt to make her more realistic, but since the fans reacted poorly to it, they were willing to adjust it according to the fans' opinions.

Name	Yuezheng Ling
Age	16
Height	160 cm / 5 ft 3 in
Weight	41 kg / 90 lb
Signature color	Red (#EE0000)

== See also ==
- List of Vocaloid products
