= VY2 =

Voice synthesizer software

- VY2V3 Neo package
- Release: April 25, 2011
- Stable release: VY2V5 / July 12, 2018
- Operating system: Microsoft Windows macOS
- Available in: Japanese
- Type: Voice Synthesizer Software
- License: Proprietary

VY2 is a Japanese masculine vocal developed by Yamaha Corporation and distributed by Bplats, Inc. to act as a "standard" vocal for Vocaloid. It has the codename of "Yūma". It was originally released for the Vocaloid 2 engine. The fan design "Roro" which is illustrated by song producer Manbou no Ane, is commonly used to represent VY2. VY2 also has a Falsetto Voicebank that allows users to make higher pitched songs with its voice. VY2's voice bank is often used with the VY1 voice bank.

== Development ==
"VY2" means "VOCALOID YAMAHA 2". Like VY1 before it, it has no official avatar, although producers using the software have used various interpretations over time. It was also specified to be a "young masculine" voice. VY2 itself was released on 25 April 2011. According to the details of the VOCALOID, the VOCALOID is an attempt to make the vocals sound more realistic and stable. It was the youngest male vocalists sampled at the time of recording and during development Japanese masculine Vocaloid 2 vocals Camui Gackpo, Hiyama Kiyoteru and Utatane Piko were compared during production to help develop VY2.

=== Additional Software ===
Due to the professional design of VY2, the vocal often appears in use for apps and equipment that involves derivative products produced by YAMAHA, either on its own or with VY1. However, unlike VY1, VY2 is often added as an additional vocal or an alternative one and has yet to head a product using their vocals.

In October it was released for the iVocaloid iOS app. VY2 was due for release on VocaloWitter in the summer of 2011 and VY2's version would have adjusted the VY1 version for compatibility and performance reasons. However, it has never been released.

The first major update to the software was released on October 19, 2012, for the Vocaloid 3 engine. The release contained two vocals "Normal", which was an update of the original vocal and "Falsetto". Once imported into Vocaloid 4, the vocals would be able to also make use of the cross-synthesis feature ("XSY"). Due to the popularity of the vocal a second re-release of the vocal was released titled "VY2V3 SE". In 2013, an additional re-release titled "VY2V3 Neo" was released as the Mac version of the software.

Both the VY2V3 vocals would be released for the Mobile Vocaloid Editor, as separate releases for purchase.

VY2V3 and V3 Gackpoid were also the focus of vol.4 of the VOCALOID-P data series.

On July 2, 2018, it was announced that the VOCALOID SHOP would cease distribution of the VOCALOID4 editor, the VOCALOID4 editor for Cubase, and the VOCALOID4 starter packs. In addition, VY1v4, VY2v3, Cyber Diva, and CYBER SONGMAN were confirmed to be taken off of the site as well. This was set to occur on July 12.

On July 12, VOCALOID5 was announced and released. It was available in two versions: Standard and Premium. The standard package included 4 standard vocals: Amy, Chris, Kaori, and Ken. The premium package included the 4 standard vocals and an updated version of VY1, VY2, CYBER DIVA II, and CYBER SONGMAN II.

== See also ==
- List of Vocaloid products
- VY1, the feminine counterpart of the program.
- Cyber Diva, the other vocal of the same series
