= Yohioloid =

Voice synthesizer software

- Yohioloid package
- Developer: VocaTone
- Release: September 10, 2013
- Operating system: Windows
- Platform: PC
- Size: 1.57 GB
- Available in: English, Japanese
- Type: Vocal Synthesizer Application
- License: Proprietary

Yohioloid (stylized as YOHIOloid) is an English-language Vocaloid developed by VocaTone and distributed by PowerFX He also has an additional Japanese voice bank. His vocals were sampled from Swedish singer Yohio, and he was released for Vocaloid 3.

== Development ==
Yohioloid was developed as a special vocal with an aim at rock music and Visual kei. VocaTone began production of another vocal following the release of Oliver. Yohio, by rare opportunity, offered himself and his vocal was put on priority due to its English/Japanese potential. His vocal was recorded in Sundsvall, Yohio's hometown at the Ninetone Studios. Following a series of rumours, it was later confirmed that Yohio was going to voice a bilingual Vocaloid with English and Japanese capabilities. Yohio himself confirmed this through a tweet. After delays with regard to issues related to the English vocal, he was released on 10 September 2013. DVD release of the voice bank was later available for purchase on September 17.

MusicTech magazine ranked Yohioloid and the Vocaloid 3 software as 7/10 and gave the overall package a good review. Yohioloid's anime influence was highly noticeable to the reviewer and generally understood he was made to suit the anime-fan target demographic.

== Competition ==
Yohioloid's illustration was picked via a contest where entries were given the chance to have their artwork be chosen for the final cover art of the software. The winner was picked by Yohio himself. Later the contest winning image appeared, though this was confirmed to be not the final version of the artwork and adjustments were being made to it.

== Characteristics ==
The black floating cube on the box is called "Cubi". Along with Cubi, Yohioloid has many pets. A female cube who functions as a rewind button and a male cube who functions as a fast-forward button, and they are the younger siblings of Cubi. There is another cube that walks on four legs and is a rectangle, it functions as a box to store a microphone. The older sister of Cubi is a cat-like cube that constantly searches for information on the internet and the older brother of Cubi is a large bulky amp. His only non-technological pet is a black cat that wears a yellow ribbon.

== See also ==
- List of Vocaloid products
