= PowerFX =

Audio production company in Stockholm, Sweden

PowerFX Systems AB.
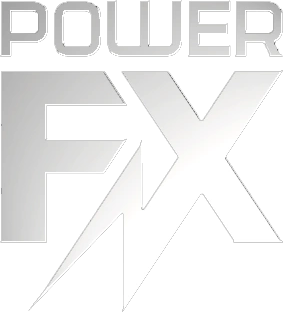
- Company type: Private
- Industry: Software, Internet
- Genre: Music and video
- Founded: December 2, 1998; 27 years ago
- Defunct: February 2025
- Fate: Renamed to Soundation AB. However, the PowerFX VOCALOID product lineup has been retired; only Soundation Studio remained.
- Successor: Soundation AB (Soundation Studio)
- Headquarters: Stockholm, Sweden
- Area served: Europe
- Key people: Bil Bryant (Production and CEO, until 2017)
- Products: List
- Services: Online shopping; Music education; Consumer generated media
- Website: https://powerfx.com (now redirects to soundation.com)

PowerFX Systems AB, commonly referred to simply as PowerFX, was a small recording company, based in Stockholm, Sweden. The company has been producing music samples, loops and sound effects since 1995. They also developed singing synthesizers using the VOCALOID engine developed by Yamaha Corporation.

== Products and services ==
=== VOCALOID ===
PowerFX was first introduced to the VOCALOID software after the introduction of the first VOCALOIDs (LEON and LOLA) from the British studio Zero-G at the NAMM Show on January 15, 2004, and were later recommended to Yamaha Corporation by Crypton Future Media. Their first product for the software was "Sweet ANN" a VOCALOID2 voicebank and was first introduced at the Musikmesse fair and later released on June 29, 2007. The boxart of Sweet ANN is based on an edited picture of actress Lena Horne from the theatrical poster of the 1943 film Stormy Weather. Their second VOCALOID2 "Big Al" was released with the voice provided by former employee Frank S. after the intended provider, Elvis Presley impersonator Michael King, was unable to return for further recordings after their initial samples were considered not at a high enough quality to be released. PowerFX began their distribution of voicebanks for the VOCALOID3 engine, with "OLIVER" as their first VOCALOID3, and the first male VOCALOID3. OLIVER was developed under Anders Sodergren, the leader of VocaTone, a team of fan-based VOCALOID producers. VocaTone then had PowerFX release their second VOCALOID3, "YOHIOloid", a bilingual male vocal that is capable of singing in English and Japanese, sampled from Swedish singer Yohio. PowerFX released their own VOCALOIDs into Taiwan boasting new box art for the releases. PowerFX released an American-accented VOCALOID4 voicebank "RUBY" in 2015. RUBY was developed as a collaboration between PrinceSyo and Mishakeet, her voice actress, with a strong and bright voice in mind. After Bil Bryant left in 2017, PowerFX announced that they would no longer make VOCALOID products, despite Bil having said more were planned after RUBY.

Product	Language	Sex	Voice Provider	Release date
Sweet ANN	English	Female	Jody (unrevealed)	June 29, 2007
BIG AL	English	Male	Frank S.	December 22, 2009
OLIVER	English	Male	Unrevealed	December 21, 2011
YOHIOloid	English and Japanese	Male	Yohio	September 10, 2013
RUBY	English	Female	Mishakeet	October 7, 2015

PowerFX's other music composers include:

- SoundShuttle
- Swiss Army Synth
- Miracle Drumlooper
- Dyad
- Humbox VM1

=== Soundation Studio ===
PowerFX also offers Soundation Studio, an on-line free music making station complete with a number of samples and loops. Users can open their own account and buy additional samples for their account or upload their own samples into the software to work with. Those who sign up can have their own profile and save their work using AudioLocker.

Extracts of PowerFX's Sweet ANN and BIG AL were included in Soundation Studio in their Christmas loops and sound release with a competition included.
