= Yanhe (software) =

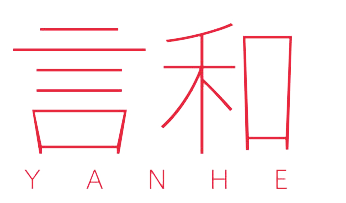
- The logo of Yanhe
- Developer: Shanghai Henian Information Technology Co. Ltd.
- Release: July 11, 2013; 13 years ago
- Operating system: Windows
- Platform: PC
- Available in: Chinese (Mandarin)
- Type: Vocal Synthesizer Application
- License: Proprietary
- Website: www.thstars.com/vsinger/

Yanhe (言和)
- Vsinger character
- Created by: MQ
- Designed by: Sainker
- Voiced by: Seira Ryū
- Age: 17
- Height: 170 cm
- Eye color: Blue
- Representative color: #00FFCC
- Appearance: Long legs with a keyboard scroll on her right leg

In-universe information
- Gender: Female

Yanhe (Chinese: 言和; pinyin: Yánhé) is a Chinese Vocaloid developed formerly by Bplats, Inc. under the Yamaha Corporation, and was created in collaboration with Shanghai Henian Information Technology Co. Ltd. She was released for the Vocaloid 3 and Vocaloid 5 engines. Her voice is provided by Chinese voice actress Seira Ryū. It was announced on the 9th Chinese International Cartoon and Game Expo (CCG) on July 11, 2013. She is the second Vocaloid Chinese singer character, following Luo Tianyi.

== See also ==
- List of Vocaloid products
