= Fukase =

Vocaloid voicebank

- Fukase starter pack
- Developer: Yamaha Corporation
- Release: January 28th, 2016
- Operating system: Microsoft Windows macOS
- Available in: Japanese, English
- Type: Voice Synthesizer Software
- Website: vocaloidfukase.jp/mob/index.php

Fukase (ふかせ) is a Vocaloid voicebank developed and distributed by Yamaha Corporation for Vocaloid 4. He is voiced by Satoshi Fukase (深瀬慧), the lead singer of the Japanese band Sekai no Owari.

== Development ==
On August 4, 2015, it was announced that the lead singer of Sekai no Owari, Fukase, would be receiving a Vocaloid voicebank. A design contest was held for him from August 4 to August 31.

Production of the vocal began three years prior when Satoshi Fukase's office contacted the voice provider via letter. The voice was always intended to be bilingual, due to SEKAI NO OWARI's tendency to use English in their songs. However, there was only one native English speaker among the staff with experience recording English voicebanks. They continued to create vocal recordings even while Satoshi Fukase was abroad.

The English took 3 times longer to record and was done in 6 or 7 sections. At the time, English vocal Cyber Diva was under way in development and knowledge gained from this vocal impacted the balance of English vocals. "Soft" as chosen for Japanese to give a more whisper-like quality to the vocal. The Japanese "normal" draft was powerful in pitch especially with #G3, a decision was made to not focus on power. The plug-in "Electronica-Tune" was designed to be a snap-in pitch plug-in and mimicks Autotune, adding vocal effects within Vocaloid itself rather than via the DAW.

On September 18, the winner of the design contest was revealed to be Mikuma.

On January 8, 2016, four demos for Fukase were released. It was announced that he would receive two Japanese voicebanks: Normal and Soft. In addition, he received an English voicebank, which made him a Japanese and English bilingual VOCALOID. His digital download, physical copy and starter packs were marked for release on January 28.

== See also ==
- List of Vocaloid products
