= To the End =

To the End may refer to:

- "To the End" (Blur song), a 1994 song by the rock band Blur
- To the End (2022 film), 2022 climate change film
- To the End (2024 film), 2024 film about Blur
- "To the End" (My Chemical Romance song), a song by the rock band My Chemical Romance
- "To the End" (Yohio song), 2014 song by Yohio
