= Break the Border =

Studio album by Yohio
- Released: 27 March 2013 (Sweden); 15 May 2013 (Japan)
- Recorded: 2012–2013
- Genre: Rock; pop
- Length: 39:16 (Standard); 40:08 (Japanese); 50:08 (Platinum)
- Label: Ninetone Records / Universal Music AB (Sweden); Thunderball667 / Universal Music Japan (Japan)

Yohio chronology
Reach the Sky (2012)	Break the Border (2013)	Together We Stand Alone (2014)

Singles from Break the Border
- 1. "Our Story" Released: 19 October 2012; 2. "Heartbreak Hotel" Released: 24 February 2013

Break the Border (stylized as BREAK the BORDER) is the debut album by Swedish singer of English/Japanese/Swedish music Yohio. The original press was initially released on Sweden, 27 March 2013 with a limited number of tracks all sang in English. The Japanese edition was released in Japan on 15 May 2013 with all songs sang in Japanese and one exclusive track featuring Gackt.

The album contains "Heartbreak Hotel", the song Yohio performed in Melodifestivalen 2013 in a bid to represent Sweden in the Eurovision Song Contest 2013 finishing second overall in the competition.

In June 2013, a Platinum Edition was released in Sweden with the tracks of the ordinary Swedish edition plus three more tracks. The album debuted at number 35 in the Swedish Albums Chart.

== Track list ==
Swedish CD
No.	Title	Writer(s)	Producer(s)	Length
1.	"2013 -Beginning of the End-" (instrumental)	Yohio, Daif	Patrik Frisk, Tommy Rehn, Yohio	1:04
2.	"MY MURDEROUS URGE"	Yohio	Frisk, Rehn, Yohio	3:18
3.	"REVOLUTION"	Yohio	Frisk, Rehn, Yohio	3:11
4.	"Heartbreak Hotel" (Exclusive track for Swedish release)	Johan Fransson, Tobias Lundgren, Tim Larsson, Henrik Göranson	Johan Fransson, Tobias Lundgren, Tim Larsson, Henrik Göranson	3:03
5.	"Our Story"	Yohio	Frisk, Rehn, Yohio	3:22
6.	"Sakura, falling"	Gackt Camui, Yohio	Frisk, Rehn, Yohio	4:19
7.	"INNOCENCE"	Yohio	Frisk, Rehn, Yohio	3:42
8.	"ON THE VERGE"	Yohio	Frisk, Rehn, Yohio	3:31
9.	"rain ~A scene drenched in rain~"	Yohio	Frisk, Rehn, Yohio	4:32
10.	"TIMESCAPE" (instrumental)	Yohio	Frisk, Rehn, Yohio	1:58
11.	"Aggressive Beauty" (instrumental)	Yohio	Frisk, Rehn, Yohio	2:59
12.	"BREAK the BORDER"	Yohio	Frisk, Rehn, Yohio	4:17
Total length:				39:16

Platinum Edition
No.	Title	Length
13.	"Last Kiss" (Japanese version)	3:55
14.	"Himlen är oskyldigt blå" (Exclusive track for Swedish release)	3:44
15.	"REVOLUTION" (Japanese version)	3:12
Total length:		50:07

Japanese CD
No.	Title	Writer(s)	Producer(s)	Length
1.	"2013 -終わりの始まり-" (2013 -Owari no hajimari-)	Yohio, Daif	Patrik Frisk, Tommy Rehn, Yohio	1:04
2.	"My Murderous Urge"	Yohio	Frisk, Rehn, Yohio	3:18
3.	"Revolution"	Yohio	Frisk, Rehn, Yohio	3:11
4.	"二人のストーリー" (Futari no story)	Yohio	Frisk, Rehn, Yohio	3:22
5.	"サクラ、散ル…" (Sakura, Chiru...)	Gackt Camui, Yohio	Frisk, Rehn, Yohio	4:19
6.	"Innocence"	Yohio	Frisk, Rehn, Yohio	3:42
7.	"Last kiss" (Exclusive track for Japanese release)	Yohio	Frisk, Rehn, Yohio	3:55
8.	"On the Verge"	Yohio	Frisk, Rehn, Yohio	3:31
9.	"Rain ～雨に濡れた景色～" (Rain -Ame ni nureta keshiki-)	Yohio	Frisk, Rehn, Yohio	4:32
10.	"Timescape" (instrumental)	Yohio	Frisk, Rehn, Yohio	1:58
11.	"Aggressive Beauty" (instrumental)	Yohio	Frisk, Rehn, Yohio	2:59
12.	"Break the Border"	Yohio	Frisk, Rehn, Yohio	4:17
Total length:				40:08

== Charts ==
The album debuted at number 1 in the Swedish Albums Chart.

Chart (2013)	Peak position
Swedish Albums Chart	1
