= Together We Stand Alone =

Studio album by Yohio
- Released: 19 March 2014
- Recorded: 2013–2014
- Genre: Rock; pop
- Label: Ninetone Records / Universal Music AB

Yohio chronology
Break the Border (2013)	Together We Stand Alone (2014)	Snöängelns rike (2015)

Singles from Together We Stand Alone
- 1. "To the End" Released: 14 March 2014

Together We Stand Alone is the second studio album by Swedish singer Yohio, released in Sweden on 19 March 2014.

The album contains "To the End", the song Yohio performed in Melodifestivalen 2014 in a bid to represent Sweden in the Eurovision Song Contest 2014. The song finished sixth in the Final.

== Track listing ==
No.	Title	Writer(s)	Producer(s)	Length
1.	"Prophet in Disguise"	Yohio	Patrik Frisk, Tommy Rehn, Yohio	3:48
2.	"Don't Let Go"	Yohio	Frisk, Rehn, Yohio	3:35
3.	"Rocket"	Andreas Johnson, Peter Kvint, Yohio	Frisk, Rehn, Yohio	2:57
4.	"To the End"	Andreas Johnson, Johan Lyander, Peter Kvint, Yohio	Frisk, Rehn, Yohio	2:57
5.	"Before I Fade Away"	Yohio	Frisk, Rehn, Yohio	3:45
6.	"Together We Stand Alone"	Yohio	Frisk, Rehn, Yohio	3:34
7.	"Shattered Dreams of a Broken Nation"	Yohio	Frisk, Rehn, Yohio	3:41
8.	"Welcome to the City"	Grizzly, Mack, Tommy Tysper	Frisk, Rehn, Yohio	3:00
9.	"You're the One"	Yohio	Frisk, Rehn, Yohio	3:56
10.	"Invidia"	Yohio	Frisk, Rehn, Yohio	3:35
11.	"I Norrländska Skogars Dvala" (instrumental)	Yohio	Frisk, Rehn, Yohio	2:47
12.	"Let the Rain Fall Down"	Yohio	Frisk, Rehn, Yohio	3:19

== Charts ==
Chart (2014)	Peak position
Swedish Albums Chart	1
