= Cyber Diva =

Voice synthesizer software

- Cyber Diva Package
- Developer: Yamaha Corporation
- Release: February 4, 2015
- Stable release: CYBER DIVA II / July 12, 2018
- Operating system: Microsoft Windows macOS
- Available in: English
- Type: Voice Synthesizer Software
- License: Proprietary

Cyber Diva is a female vocal released by Yamaha for Vocaloid 4. In March 2015 on Instagram, an entertainer named Jenny Shima claimed that she was the voice provider for CYBER DIVA. Shima is an American singer, theater actress, and model.

== Development ==
The earliest known information related to her dates back to the VY2 release in 2010, in an article a pair of English VY vocals were announced for future development. At the time the developers did not know if they would re-use past samples or go with a new vocal entirely. Cyber Diva was later confirmed to be the female from the pair or "VY3" during a livestream on Vocaloid related matters.

She was produced in light of research into common complaints towards past pre-V4 English Vocals. This included the frustrations that came with the mixed British and American phonetic system the Vocaloid engine used for its English vocals. It was also discovered that English vocals often did not produce the correct sound to match the phonetics in use, caused by accidents in the construction of the vocal either during the recording process or the vocal development process. Several candidates were tested as possible vocals for the new library. During this process it was noted there were many missing sounds or unusual sounds found they did not expect to be present. There were very clear and expressive sounds present in the constructed libraries. The "Aspiration Problem" that had plagued past English vocals were also addressed and fixed. As the problem was fixed, the issue of sounds not matching input symbols were also tweaked. They did not address the issue of expressive tones until they had recorded the right sounds for the right phonetic symbol.

In February 2013, the recording script was rewritten. The aspiration problem was fixed in the new script and the sounds were compacted to make it easier to control the phonetic data better. In March, two more singers were recorded using the new script. The new script was shorter than the past one and was more difficult for any singer to produce. However, the scripts new results sacrificed expression for clarity and mislabeling was gone. Further tweaks to the scripts were done as recordings went ahead.

Once the vocal was brought to a reasonable quality, the team working on her was given the choice between going with the current singers or finding a new one. CYBER DIVA was recorded in 6 pitch layers. She has 3 main pitches, with an additional 3 sets of vowel pitches, aka stationaries. They added 231 different triphones per pitch; more than any other English library released before.

The vocal was tested by two hired English teachers. They were hired was because over half the team were Japanese and sounds that sounded weird to the non-Japanese members did not sound off to them. Due to the mix of British and American sounds, CYBER DIVA did not always sound good when the sounds were mixed. She included the schwa sound; this is not included in all English vocals despite the fact that the phonetic still was used by the voice. A custom dictionary was made for her, this was worked upon in July. Due to its size, they then had to fix the library to make it load faster. The dictionary was finalized in October 2014.

It was also confirmed that knowledge gained from her development was used for Fukase's English vocal.

=== Additional Software ===
She was also released for Mobile Vocaloid Editor, as the first English vocal for a Vocaloid related app. However, despite this the app did not update the software to an English interface.

On July 2, 2018, it was announced that the VOCALOID SHOP would cease distribution of the VOCALOID4 editor, the VOCALOID4 editor for Cubase, and the VOCALOID4 starter packs. In addition, VY1v4, VY2v3, CYBER DIVA, and CYBER SONGMAN were confirmed to be taken off of the site as well. This was set to occur on July 12.

On July 12, VOCALOID5 was announced and released. It was available in two versions: Standard and Premium. The standard package included 4 standard vocals: Amy, Chris, Kaori, and Ken. The premium package included the 4 standard vocals and an updated version of VY1, VY2, CYBER DIVA II, and CYBER SONGMAN II.

== See also ==
- List of Vocaloid products
