= Heartbreak Hotel (Yohio song) =

Single by Yohio

from the album Break the Border
- Released: Feb 24, 2013
- Recorded: 2013
- Genre: Europop
- Label: Universal Music
- Songwriters: Johan Fransson; Tobias Lundgren; Tim Larsson; Henrik Göranson; Yohio

Yohio singles chronology
"Heartbreak Hotel" (2013)	"To the End" (2014)

Heartbreak Hotel is a song performed by Swedish singer Yohio. The song made it to the Melodifestivalen 2013 final and could have become Sweden's entry at the Eurovision Song Contest 2013 in Malmö, Sweden. The song is written and produced by Johan Fransson, Tobias Lundgren, Tim Larsson, Henrik Göranson and Yohio himself.

== Music video ==
Yohio taped the music video for "Heartbreak Hotel" in Tokyo, Japan.

== Charts ==
Chart (2013)	Peak position
Sweden (Sverigetopplistan)	8
