= Vocaloid Editor for Cubase =

Version of Vocaloid editor

- Developer: Yamaha Corporation
- Stable release: Vocaloid 4.5 Editor for Cubase / 2018
- Platform: Microsoft Windows macOS
- Available in: Japanese
- Type: Voice Synthesizer Software
- License: Proprietary

Vocaloid Editor for Cubase is a version of the Vocaloid editor that has been adapted to be compatible with the Cubase Digital audio workstation.

== About ==
The software did not come with any new vocals, but was able to impart Vocaloid 2 and Vocaloid 3 engine vocals. The advantage of this version, however, is that it is fully capable of working with the Cubase software and utilizing all the features of the Cubase software without fear of compatibility related problems. This means the vocals can be used alongside features such as mixers and buses together smoothly. Those who bought this version of the software did not need to additionally buy Vocaloid 3 or its later Mac version Vocaloid Neo.

When Vocaloid Net was officially opened, exchange of data between this version of the software, Vocaloid 3, Vocaloid Neo and iVocaloid were opened up. This allowed producers to make music on the go between very different versions of the Vocaloid software for the first time. It was later adapted for the Vocaloid Neo version of the Vocaloid 3 software, allowing it to work with Macs. Though it was designed to work for both Window or Mac, it was only possible to install one version or the other, as is the current case for all Mac versions of Vocaloid. In regards to its limitations, like Vocaloid Neo the Mac version was limited to being only able to use Mac compatible vocals such as Galaco Neo or VY1v3 Neo. As a result, the entire Vocaloid 2 catalog could not be used for the Mac version of Vocaloid Editor for Cubase at all.

The last version of the Vocaloid 3 adaption was 1.0.3 was released on August 5, 2013.

Support continues for the Vocaloid 4 version of the software. This version of the software is can be used by producers on either Windows or Mac. However, it is the only Mac version of the Vocaloid 4 software editor. As with the Vocaloid 3 version of the software, those who own this version do not additionally need the normal Vocaloid 4 version of the software and Windows only compatible vocals are incapable of being used with the Mac version.

The Vocaloid Editor for Cubase was updated to version 4.5 with the release of Vocaloid 5.
