= Big Al (software) =

English language Vocaloid software

BIG AL
- The revised package for BIG AL.
- Developer: PowerFX
- Release: December 22, 2009
- Operating system: Windows
- Platform: PC
- Available in: English
- Type: Vocal Synthesizer Application
- License: Proprietary
- Website: powerfx.com/products/big-al

Big Al (officially stylized as BIG AL) is an English language Vocaloid developed by PowerFX for Vocaloid 2.

He is marketed as the counterpart of Sweet Ann, the first Vocaloid developed by PowerFX.

== Development ==
He was released as the male counterpart to Sweet Ann and was released on December 22, 2009. He was later released in Japan on March 3, 2010, and in Taiwan September 7, 2011. He was the first Vocaloid to have a confirmed American accent.

An early demo song of MIRIAM and BIG AL was personally requested by Bil Bryant and Alexei Ustinov, who started testing Big-Al in January 2007 with "Help Me Understand You" for the MusikMesse 2007 fair., Originally Elvis Presley impersonator Michael King was to be his provider. When the vocal was in the editing process PowerFX tried to fix the pronunciation problems with the vocal, and even though demos were posted on the net, they felt it was not good enough to be released. When they attempted to re-record King, they found that he was too busy touring. Frank Sanderson, a professional voice over artist, studio engineer/owner and former PowerFX employee then did the voice over which was used for the program.

New boxart was done to match the new voice given to him.

When he was first released, users were unable to download him, leading to complaints from both English and Japanese fans. The problem was corrected by PowerFX switching download providers. The report on his problem was that his file had simply been too large. PowerFX then put up a notice that they will make sure buyers received the program no matter what, even if the company had to post it to them. Those that had pre-ordered him were given a $50 gift certificate for the PowerFX shop as compensation for the downloading problem.

His Taiwan release also saw a new boxart.

== Characteristics ==
Like his female counter partner Sweet Ann, Big Al is based on Frankenstein's monster. His early concept art used edited artwork from 1931 film "Frankenstein" along with edited Uncle Sam poster art. Unlike Sweet Ann, he was given a biography by PowerFX. When E-Capsule co. Ltd released his software in Taiwan, a different biography was also given as well as a different design.

Name	Big Al
Age	25 (PowerFX); 21 (E-Capsule)
Height	193 cm / 6 ft 4 in(PowerFX); 185 cm / 6 ft 1 in(E-Capsule)
Weight	86 kg / 190 lb(PowerFX); 73 kg / 161 lb (E-Capsule)
Suggested Tempo Range	70-145 bpm(E-Capsule)
Suggested Vocal Range	G1-D3 (E-Capsule)

== See also ==
- List of Vocaloid products
