= To the End (Yohio song) =

Single by Yohio

from the album Together We Stand Alone
- Released: 2014
- Recorded: 2014
- Songwriter(s): Andreas Johnson; Johan Lyander; Peter Kvint; Yohio

Yohio singles chronology
"Heartbreak Hotel" (2013)	"To the End" (2014)

"To the End" is a 2014 music single performed by singer Yohio in the first semifinal of Melodifestivalen 2014 on 1 February in Malmö Arena. The song made it to the final to be held at Friends Arena on 8 March from the semifinal, where it finished sixth overall.

== Charts ==
Chart (2013)	Peak position
Sweden (Sverigetopplistan)	38
