= Seira Ryū =

Japanese voice actress

- 劉セイラ
- Born: Liu Jingluo (劉婧犖); November 25, 1985 (age 40); Beijing, China
- Occupation: Voice actress
- Years active: 2011–present
- Agent: Aoni Production
- Height: 163 cm (5 ft 4 in)

Liu Jingluo (Chinese: 劉婧犖; pinyin: Liú Jìngluò; born November 25, 1985), known professionally as Seira Ryū (劉セイラ, Ryū Seira), is a Chinese voice actress based in Japan. She is affiliated with Aoni Production.

== Life and career ==
Liu Jingluo was born on November 25, 1985, in Beijing. In kindergarten, she developed an interest in the Japanese language through the opening and ending songs for the anime Saint Seiya, through which she also developed a love for anime. When she was in sixth grade, she watched Neon Genesis Evangelion with Chinese subtitles, and was impressed by the performances of the Japanese voice actors, which led her to aspire to become a voice actress in Japan.

In high school, she participated in the creation of doujin games and drama CDs, and participated in voice actress/singer-related activities under the name of "kkryu". In 2006, she became a student of Beijing Foreign Studies University's Japanese language institute and in 2008 graduated from the university. During her time at BFSU, she was an exchange student in Japan, studying at Aichi Bunkyo University for ten months.

After graduation, she studied again at the Nippon Engineering College (NEEC) for two years. While studying, she appeared as a seventh grade middle school student in the show Dream Dream Party.

In the 2016 interview, Ryū said that she was influenced by the success of Romi Park in the seiyu scene. Ryū realized that voice actors of non-Japanese heritage could have a successful career, unaware that Park was a Zanichi Korean who was born and raised in Japan, a fact she was shocked to learn later.

== Filmography ==
=== Television animation ===
2014

- Pretty Guardian Sailor Moon Crystal as Shingo Tsukino

=== Theatrical animation ===
2014

- Expelled from Paradise as Administration Public Relations

2023

- Pretty Guardian Sailor Moon Cosmos The Movie as Shingo Tsukino

=== OVA ===
- 2015: Digimon Story: Cyber Sleuth as Fei Wong Tomoe Ignacio
- 2016: The King of Fighters XIV as Meitenkun
- 2017: Digimon Story: Cyber Sleuth – Hacker's Memory as Fei Wong Tomoe Ignacio
- 2019: Samurai Shodown (2019) as Wu-Ruixiang
- 2022: The King of Fighters XV as Meitenkun

=== Other ===
- Vocaloid3 sound library Yanhe sound source
