= Yohio =

Swedish singer and songwriter

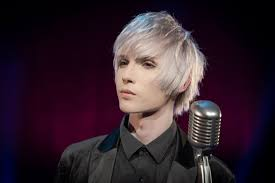
- Yohio (2018)

Background information
- Also known as: YOHIO (ヨヒオ)
- Born: Kevin Johio Lucas Rehn Eires; 12 July 1995 (age 31); Sundsvall, Sweden
- Genres: Hard rock; pop rock; heavy metal; alternative; popera; J-pop; Europop
- Occupations: Musician, songwriter
- Instruments: Vocals, guitar, piano, bass
- Years active: 2010–present
- Label: Keios Entertainment (CEO)
- Formerly of: Seremedy; DISREIGN

Kevin Johio Lucas Rehn Eires (born 12 July 1995), known professionally as Yohio (stylized as YOHIO), is a Swedish singer and songwriter. He is best known for his performances as Yohio, wearing a lolita dress in previous years, with an androgynous appearance on stage. He is a former member of the Swedish rock band Seremedy, which disbanded in April 2013. Yohio has participated in Melodifestivalen both in 2013 and 2014, making it to the final on both occasions. He is one of the co-founders and current CEO of Keios Entertainment.

== Family and early life ==
Yohio was born in Stockholm, Sweden, on 12 July 1995 and is the son of Tommy Rehn of the Swedish heavy metal band Corroded, and Johanna Eires. Shortly after, his family moved to Sundsvall, where he grew up. When he was six years old he started learning to play the piano, and later learned the guitar at age eleven. He wrote his first song when he was six years old.

He is the grandson of Jan-Eric Rehn, who was a guitarist in 1960s band The Panthers and the nephew of Chris Rehn of Swedish post-grunge/pop rock band Takida. Chris and Tommy Rehn were also both in the band Angtoria. Yohio speaks Japanese, after becoming interested in Japanese culture and visual kei at a young age, and also spending time in Japan on his several trips to the country performing his music.

== Career in Sweden ==
Yohio and his band Seremedy gained some recognition in Sweden starting in 2011. The band consisted of lead vocalist SEIKE, YOHIO on lead guitar, Ray on guitar, JENZiiH on bass and LINDER on drums. The band released their first EP Seasons Will Change in 2011 and their first album Welcome to our Madness on 25 July 2012. The band then broke up and made a one time return for a last live show and EP Re:Madness on 20 September 2014.

Yohio received special attention for wearing a dress when performing. In 2012 Yohio released his first English song as a solo performer, "Our Story". Yohio has made four music videos – for "Sky Limit", "Our Story", "Heartbreak Hotel" (his entry for Melodifestivalen 2013) and "Revolution".

In 2013, it was announced that Yohio was lending his voice to a Vocaloid voicebank within the PowerFX range that contains both an English and Japanese vocal. He provided the voicebank for YOHIOloid.

=== Melodifestivalen 2013 ===
Yohio was one of the contestants in the 2013 edition of Melodifestivalen, the Swedish national selection for the Eurovision Song Contest 2013 to be held in Malmö. His song was "Heartbreak Hotel", which he wrote along with Johan Fransson, Tobias Lundgren, Tim Larsson and Henrik Göranson. On 2 February, Yohio was qualified for the contest's finals. Soon after, on 9 March, he came second place with Robin Stjernberg leading him as the final winner with 166 points. Yohio earned 133 points with his successful song "Heartbreak Hotel". Yohio was the Swedish spokesperson and announcer of the Swedish voting result at the 2013 Eurovision final in Malmö.

=== Melodifestivalen 2014 ===
Yohio took part in the first heat of Melodifestivalen 2014 at the Malmö Arena with the song "To the End", performing first. Yohio was announced as the first act to go directly to the final at the Friends Arena on 8 March. In the final, he came in sixth place.

=== DISREIGN ===
Yohio formed a new band that consists of Valentin on guitar, Tias on drums and former Seremedy bandmate, JENZiiH on bass. They released their first single and PV "Until The Fade" on 8 May 2015 and released the single worldwide on 5 August 2015. The PV was directed by Die/may band member Riotcolor. This marked Yohio's return to a band and his return to singing in Japanese since Shiraha in 2015. Since then, DISREIGN has released multiple EPs and singles, with their most recent being "VEXED" on 27 May 2020.

== Career in Japan ==
In April 2012, Yohio released his first EP "Reach the Sky" in Japan, which placed 82nd on Oricon. His song "SKY☆LiMiT" ranked first on the 2nd week in May 2012 of Rekochoku weekly ranking. His first full album, Break the Border was released in June 2013, three months after the Swedish release. It entered the Oricon weekly charts on one occasion, at position 285.

In 2023, Yohio began releasing singles for an upcoming Japanese album, beginning with "初恋のWHITE ROSE".

== Producing career ==
Yohio has mixed a song for former Seremedy bandmate Seike's band Die/May single The Return, making this their first time working together since the break up of Seremedy (before the reunion in 2014) Yohio also wrote the lyrics to the song "I'm Sorry" tweeting "Writing some R&B right now for another artist. Not my territory at all, but very interesting to create. Love how you can play with vocals!" The song was sung by Oskar Bruzell.

== Acting career and television appearances ==
In 2015, Yohio acted in the critically acclaimed mystery series Jordskott as the character "Linus". In the same year, the Dröse & Norberg theatrical company produced "Snövit the Musical", a modern-day musical adaptation of the classic fairy tale, in which Yohio played the role of the prince. The show ran again in 2022, with Yohio returning to the spotlight.

He also appeared in 2022 on the second season of Masked Singer Sverige, making it to 4th place.

== Tours ==
Celebrating the release of his debut English album Break the Border, Yohio made a tour of Europe in 2013. The final took place in Stockholm, with Gackt joining him onstage for a duet of the song they wrote together.

In June 2024, Yohio accompanied Kamijo on his European tour "The Anthem" as a guitarist. The tour finished on June 16 in London.

== Discography ==
=== Studio albums ===
Title	Details	Peak chart positions	Certification
Title	Details	SWE	Certification
Break the Border	Released: 27 March 2013; Label: Ninetone/Universal; Format: CD, digital download	1	GLF: Gold
Break the Border (Platinum Edition)	Released: June 2013; Label: Ninetone/Universal; Format: CD, digital download	1	GLF: Gold
Together We Stand Alone	Released: 19 March 2014; Label: Ninetone/Universal; Format: CD, digital download	1	
Snöängelns rike	Released: 27 November 2015; Label: Keios Entertainment; Format: CD, digital download	18	
A Pretty Picture in a Most Disturbing Way	Released: 27 November 2020; Label: Keios Entertainment; Format: CD, digital download	—	
dreamchaser.	Released: 11 December 2024; Label: Keios Entertainment; Format: digital download	—	
"—" denotes a recording that did not chart or was not released in that territory.

=== EPs ===
Title	Details	Peak chart positions	Certification
Title	Details	JPN	Certification
Reach the Sky	Released: 25 April 2012; Format: digital download	82	
"—" denotes recording that did not chart or was not released in that territory.

=== Singles ===
Title	Year	Peak chart positions	Certifications	Album
Title	Year	SWE	Certifications	Album
"Sky☆Limit"	2012	—		Reach the Sky
"Our Story"	2012	—		Break the Border
"Himlen är oskyldigt blå"	2013	—		Break the Border (Platinum Edition)
"Heartbreak Hotel"	2013	8	GLF: Platinum	Break the Border
"Revolution"	2013	—		Break the Border
"You're The One"	2013	—		Together We Stand Alone
"Welcome To The City"	2013	—		Together We Stand Alone
"To the End"	2014	38	GLF: Gold	Together We Stand Alone
"Rocket"	2014	—		Together We Stand Alone
"Zchlagernörden Ibrahimovic"	2016	—		—
"夏の終わりの約束"	2017	—		dreamchaser.
"Tick Tack (Genius)"	2018	—		A Pretty Picture in a Most Disturbing Way
"Merry Go Round"	2018	—		A Pretty Picture in a Most Disturbing Way
"My Nocturnal Serenade"	2019	—		A Pretty Picture in a Most Disturbing Way
"Silent Rebellion"	2019	—		A Pretty Picture in a Most Disturbing Way
"defeating a devil a day"	2019	—		A Pretty Picture in a Most Disturbing Way
"Oh My... Polkadot Politics"	2020	—		A Pretty Picture in a Most Disturbing Way
"LIGHT MY WAY"	2020	—		dreamchaser.
"Daydreams"	2020	—		A Pretty Picture in a Most Disturbing Way
"Opera #2"	2020	—		—
"You'll Believe It (If You Sing It)"	2020	—		A Pretty Picture in a Most Disturbing Way
"Undo"	2021	—		A Pretty Picture in a Most Disturbing Way
"初恋のWHITE ROSE"	2023	—		dreamchaser.
"naive"	2023	—		dreamchaser.
"Destiny"	2023	—		—
"記憶の迷路-Maze of Memories-"	2024	—		dreamchaser.
"dim dayz"	2024	—		dreamchaser.
"—" denotes a recording that did not chart or was not released in that territory.

=== DVDs ===
Title	Details	Peak chart positions	Certification
Title	Details	SWE	Certification
BREAK THE BORDER TOUR FINAL	Released: 6 December 2013; Format: digital download	1	
"—" denotes a recording that did not chart or was not released in that territory.
