= Bplats =

Japanese application service provider

Bplats, Inc. ビープラッツ株式会社
- Company type: Public KK
- Traded as: TYO: 4381
- Industry: Cloud computing; Electronic commerce; Business process outsourcing; Business process management; Music industry
- Founded: November 2006
- Founder: Kenji Fujita
- Headquarters: 4F COI Uchikanda Bldg., 3-2-8 Uchikanda, Chiyoda-ku, Tokyo; 101-0047 Japan
- Area served: Japan and China
- Key people: Kenji Fujita, President and CEO
- Products: List
- Services: List
- Website: Official website

Bplats, Inc. is an application service provider (ASP) based in Tokyo, Japan. The company offers software as a service (SaaS) and platform as a service (PaaS) solutions. It runs web portals on ASP, SaaS and cloud computing and an online store to sell software and hardware, such as the VY Vocaloid series.

== Services ==
The SaaS and PaaS services of the company include:

- SaaSplats: a SaaS consultancy and distribution network
- eCPlats: an electronic commerce platform
- RightsPlats: a business process outsourcing service to report music sales to JASRAC
- License-V: a business process management service to control licensing business

== Products ==
Bplats sells the Vocaloid series VY planned and developed by Yamaha Corporation, along with related software and hardware. The VY series of Vocaloids are different from other Vocaloids as their considered as having no form of avatar and were designed to be a high quality professional voicebank as well as to act as the intended standard for the Vocaloids products themselves. Though each voicebank has a gender type voice (feminine, masculine) the Vocaloid series itself is void of such restrictions and are designed with the intention of allowing those using them to be able to manipulate the voice as they please. The avatarless look was intended to encourage creativity with the series. VY1, the first of the series, was released with a demo album containing songs by various producers from Nico Nico Douga and their interpretation of the Vocaloid along with the settings used for the song. Bplats focused on their high quality Vocaloids, even delaying VY2 for quality related issue; VY2 was created with the intention of being realistic and stable. Bplats is looking to produce male and female English Vocaloid products, with improvements to the standard of English used by the software, another Vocaloid is already under production.

=== Vocaloid 2 products ===
==== Released products ====
Product	Language	Sex	Release date
VY1	Japanese	Unisex ("feminine" sounding vocal)	September 1, 2010
VY2	Japanese	Unisex ("young masculine" sounding vocal)	April 25, 2011

=== Vocaloid 3 products ===
==== Released products ====
Product	Language	Sex	Release date
VY1v3	Japanese	Unisex ("feminine" sounding voice)	October 21, 2011
VY2v3	Japanese	Unisex ("masculine" sounding voice)	October 9, 2012

=== Vocaloid 4 products ===
==== Released products ====
Product	Language	Sex	Release date
VY1v4	Japanese	Unisex ("feminine" sounding voice)	December 17, 2014
CYBER DIVA	English	Female	January 22, 2015
CYBER SONGMAN	English	Male	October 31, 2016

=== Vocaloid 5 products ===
==== Released products ====
Product	Language	Sex	Release date
VY1	Japanese	Unisex ("feminine" sounding voice)	July 12, 2018
VY2	Japanese	Unisex ("masculine" sounding voice)	July 12, 2018
CYBER DIVA II	English	Female	July 12, 2018
CYBER SONGMAN II	English	Male	July 12, 2018
