= Vocaloid 5 =

2018 singing voice synthesizer

- Vocaloid 5 on Windows 10
- Original author: Yamaha Corporation
- Developer: Yamaha Corporation
- Release: July 12, 2018
- Stable release: 5.7.2 / December 7, 2023
- Operating system: Microsoft Windows macOS
- Predecessor: Vocaloid 4
- Successor: Vocaloid 6
- Available in: Japanese, English, Spanish, Korean, Chinese
- Type: Voice Synthesizer Software
- License: Proprietary
- Website: www.vocaloid.com/en/

Vocaloid 5 (Note: Japanese: ＶＯＣＡＬＯＩＤ５. (while Yamaha uses the latin alphabet to write the official name, it unofficially uses "ボーカロイド" (Bōkaroido) in katakana within its documentation and press releases in Japanese).) is a singing vocal synthesizer and successor to Vocaloid 4 in the Vocaloid series. It was succeeded by Vocaloid 6.

== History ==
On July 2, 2018, Yamaha announced that both the official Vocaloid website and shop would be temporarily shut down for maintenance on July 12, 2018, with several Vocaloid products scheduled for discontinuation. On the day of the maintenance, information on upcoming non-Yamaha vocal Haruno Sora was leaked through a preorder listing; the package was listed as an add-on for the then-unannounced Vocaloid 5. Several hours later, once the maintenance had been completed, Yamaha relaunched the Vocaloid website, officially revealing and releasing Vocaloid 5 at the same time.

Vocaloid 5 features a redesigned interface that has been described as "significantly more modern" than that of previous versions. It is the first release of Vocaloid to be exclusively sold as a bundle; all purchases include four default voicebanks - Amy, Chris, Kaori, and Ken. These voicebanks share a wide variety of preset audio samples, vocal samples, and singing styles, in both English and Japanese. Vocaloid 5 also offers finer control over many vocal functions; it includes several audio effects, editors, and parameters to manipulate output in ways that traditionally required the use of additional programs.

Vocaloid 5 requires a 64-bit operating system. Vocaloid 2 voicebanks are no longer officially supported, though voicebanks from Vocaloid 3 and newer are able to be used. Cross-synthesis (XSY) and job plug-ins do not function in Vocaloid 5.

The Vocaloid Editor for Cubase was updated to version 4.5 with the release of Vocaloid 5.

== Products ==
=== Amy ===
Amy is an English voicebank released as an integrated part of Vocaloid 5 on July 12, 2018. Her voice has been described as "expressive" and "versatile".

=== Chris ===
Chris is an English voicebank released as an integrated part of Vocaloid 5 on July 12, 2018. His voice has been described as able to sing from "delicate, soft bass" to "powerful, sustained high tones".

=== Cyber Diva II ===
This voicebank is a minor update to the Cyber Diva package. It was released on July 12, 2018.

=== Cyber Songman II ===
This voicebank is a minor update to the Cyber Songman package. It was released on 2018.

=== Kaori ===
Kaori is a Japanese voicebank released as an integrated part of Vocaloid 5 on July 12, 2018. Her voice has been described as "soulful".

=== Ken ===
Ken is a Japanese voicebank released as an integrated part of Vocaloid 5 on July 12, 2018. His voice has been described as "sharp" and "clear" with a "light vocal quality".

=== VY1 ===
This voicebank is a minor update to the VY1v4 package. It was released on July 12, 2018. VY1 only includes VY1v4's "Normal" vocal.

=== VY2 ===
This voicebank is a minor update to the VY2v3 package; it primarily adds the "growl" function. It was released on July 12, 2018. VY2 only includes VY2v3's "Standard" vocal.

=== Haruno Sora ===
Haruno Sora is a voicebank for Vocaloid 5 and Voiceroid 2 developed by AH-Software and released on July 26, 2018. Her voice provider is Kikuko Inoue. The voicebank has two voice libraries, "Natural" and "Cool".

=== Meika Hime & Mikoto ===
Meika Hime & Mikoto are two Vocaloid 5 voicebanks created by Gynoid Co., Ltd and sampled from the voice actress Kotori Koiwai. They were released on March 30, 2019, along with text-to-speech software.

=== Luo Tianyi, Yuezheng Ling & Yan He V5 ===
Three Chinese voicebanks developed by Shanghai HENIAN Information Technology Co., Ltd and released in February 2023. They serve as updates to their Vocaloid 4 versions.
