= Vocaloid 3 =

2011 singing voice synthesizer

- Vocaloid 3 on Windows 10
- Original author: Yamaha Corporation
- Developers: Yamaha Corporation; Bplats
- Release: October 21, 2011
- Stable release: 3.2.1 / December 19, 2014
- Operating system: Microsoft Windows (Vocaloid Neo for macOS)
- Predecessor: Vocaloid 2
- Successor: Vocaloid 4
- Available in: English, Japanese, Korean, Spanish, Chinese
- Type: Voice Synthesizer Software
- License: Proprietary
- Website: www.vocaloid.com/en/

Vocaloid 3 (Note: Japanese: ＶＯＣＡＬＯＩＤ３. (while Yamaha uses the latin alphabet to write the official name, it unofficially uses "ボーカロイド" (Bōkaroido) in katakana within its documentation and press releases in Japanese).) is a singing voice synthesizer and successor to Vocaloid 2 in the Vocaloid series. This version of the software is a much more expansive version, containing many new features, three new languages and many more vocals than past software versions combined. It was succeeded by Vocaloid 4.

== History ==
Vocaloid 3 launched on October 21, 2011, along with several products in Japanese, the first of its kind. Several studios are providing updates to allow Vocaloid 2 vocal libraries to come over to Vocaloid 3. With the launch of Vocaloid 3, a tool that was developed titled VocaListener, a software package that allows for realistic Vocaloid songs to be produced using human singing as a template, currently only supports Japanese vocals. It supports additional languages including Chinese, Korean, and Spanish. It is also able to use plug-ins for the software itself and switch between normal and "classic" mode for less realistic vocal results. Unlike previous versions, the vocal libraries and main editing software are sold as two separate items. The vocal libraries themselves only contain a "tiny" version of the Vocaloid 3 editing software. Yamaha will also be granting the licensing of plug-ins and use of the Vocaloid software for additional mediums such as video games. Vocaloid 3 is the first version to have triphone support, which improves language capabilities. The first Spanish Vocaloids, Clara and Bruno, were released in 2011.

New technology is also being used to bring back the voice of the singer Hitoshi Ueki who died in 2007. This is the first attempt to bring back a singer whose voice had been lost, yet it had been considered a possibility since the software was first released in 2004. However, this is only being done for private use. A second attempt was made with the voice of hide, a member of group X Japan, who died in 1998.

The software was given a special version called "Vocaloid Editor for Cubase", this was a special version that would work with the Digital audio workstation. An OS X version of the software called Vocaloid Neo was announced on July 24, 2013. Several voices have since been confirmed for this version of the software. Producers who owned vocals that had Mac versions had their licenses updated to allow Mac installation of those vocals, however only the Windows or Mac install was allowed and both could not be installed under the same purchase. In 2013, the first Catalan vocal project was introduced called "ONA".

A series of resource packs called "Vocaloid-P Data series" were also released. A total of 4 volumes were released, the series was retired with the introduction of the SE versions of several vocals. In addition, Vocaloid 3, Vocaloid Neo and i-Vocaloid were later given an update which allowed access to a cloud storage system called "Vocaloid Net". This allowed users to use all 3 versions of the software to access stored files made in any of the 3 software.

Vocaloid 3 allowed for more variety of vocals to be produced, including some that Vocaloid 2 could not allow.

"VocaListener", which had been announced during Vocaloid 2, was released as a Job plug-in for the Vocaloid 3 software.

Vocaloid 3 vocals were also able to be imported into Vocaloid 4.

== Products ==
=== Mew ===
Mew was released as a realistic Japanese vocal. She was released on October 21, 2011, as one of the 4 release date vocal. The voice is based on the singing results of Miu Sakamoto. A second edition was released under the name of "Mew SE", as one of five products that was released in the SE edition range. Mew Neo was later released on August 5, 2013.

=== SeeU ===
SeeU was released as the first Korean vocal for the Vocaloid 3 software, being one of the four release date vocals released when the Vocaloid3 software launched on October 21, 2011. She is capable of Korean and Japanese and released by SBS Artech based on the voice of Kim Dahee (Glam).

Throughout pre-Vocaloid 3 release promotions, SBS stood by a claim that you can recreate English with SeeU's Korean voicebank, and in Dec 2011 even went so far to say SeeU is actually "trilingual", although the comment seemed odd as SeeU had only two voicebanks. In Feb 2012 they stated that they were working on a full English voicebank. In August 2012, SBS reported that the recordings for the voicebank had been completed and was now going through a tuning process. Her English VB will be similar to an append and her design slightly adjusted. On February 4, 2013, in response to a Korean fan's question about the progress of English voicebank, SBS posted a reply that the development of English voicebank is on hold. Due to Dahee being incarcerated in 2015, SeeU English is not expected for a long time.

=== V3 Megpoid ===
The Vocaloid 2 product "Megpoid" was updated to the Vocaloid 3 version under the name of "V3 Megpoid". Several products were released under this name. The first of these packages was the "Megpoid Complete" product which featured 4 new vocals ("adult", "power", "sweet" and "whisper") with natural song tones. The vocals were also sold separately for users who only wanted one or two of these vocals. this was one of four packages sold on the release day of Vocaloid 3 on October 21, 2011. An updated version of the original voice of "Megpoid" was also sold called "V3 Megpoid - Native". This had the same tone and fixed several problems from the Vocaloid 2 version. This product was released on March 15, 2012. An English version of the Megpoid vocal was also released on February 28, 2013, Internet co., Ltd noted this was one of their most difficult vocals to produce because it required several times the amount of samples of the Japanese vocal to produce.

The Native and English versions would later be sold in 2016 on the Mobile Vocaloid Editor app.

=== VY1v3 ===
VY1 was updated to VY1v3 from the Vocaloid2 engine and was one of the four release dates packaged released on October 21, 2011. This was an updated version of the software with a higher quality and smoother results. The package was later released as a second edition under the name of "VY1v3 SE", as one of five products that was released in the SE edition range. VY1v3 Neo was later released on August 5, 2013.

=== Tone Rion ===
Tone Rion is a Japanese female released on December 16, 2011, in association with Dear Stage (Moe Japan). Her vocals were based on now retired Japanese singer Yumemi Nemu. She was given a second edition called "Tone Rion SE", as one of five products that was released in the SE edition range.

=== Oliver ===
Oliver is an English male vocal based on the voice of a 13-year-old child. He was the first English vocal released for the new Vocaloid 3 engine and the first English based on a child's voice. He was designed as a choir singer. He was released on December 21, 2011, by PowerFX and was developed by VocaTone. He was the first English Vocaloid to gain a large amount of popularity, owed mostly to his usage in the show Bee and Puppycat as featured on the Cartoon Hangover YouTube channel.

=== CUL ===
CUL was released for the VOCALOID 3 software based on the voice of Eri Kitamura. She sings in Japanese and was released by Internet co., Ltd on the December 22, 2011. CUL originally started out as the mascot for the TV documentary "VOCALO Revolution" which focused on the impact VOCALOID had had on the Japanese culture. Internet Co., Ltd noted that CUL was their most difficult vocal to produce in an interview and the vocal was re-done twice, though did not use any new recording sessions.

=== Yuzuki Yukari ===
A Japanese female released for the Vocaloid 3 engine by AH Software on December 22, 2011. She is based on the voice of Chihiro Ishiguro. She was the first AH Software Vocaloid to also receive a Voiceroid vocal which was also released on December 22, 2011. A Neo version was released on December 19, 2013. She was designed by a group called Vocalomakets, the group consisted of Vocaloid producers.

=== Bruno ===
The first of a pair of Spanish vocals released for the Engine on December 24, 2011. Bruno is a male vocal produced by Voctro Labs, S.L. The two vocals had been in production since 2009.

=== Clara ===
Clara was the second of a pair of Spanish vocals released on December 22, 2011, by Voctro Labs, S.L and is a complementary female vocal for Bruno.

=== IA ===
IA was a Japanese female vocal with opera-esque results released by 1st Place. Her voice was sampled from the singer Lia and released on January 27, 2012. Her vocal proved quite popular and an additional vocal called "IA Rocks" was released on June 27, 2014. A Neo version of IA was released on December 7, 2013, while IA Rocks received a Neo version on June 27, 2014. IA was also the first vocal made for the Aria on the Planetes project.

The licensing of her product allowed her image to be used for CDs and flyers without producers having to seek permission.

=== Aoki Lapis ===
Aoki Lapis She is based on the voice of Nako Eguchi and was released on April 6, 2012, her developers were i-Style Project. She was also renewed for a second edition under the name of "Aoki Lapis SE", as one of five products that was released in the SE edition range. Aoki Lapis Neo was released on September 19, 2013.

=== V3 Lily ===
An updated on the original Vocaloid 2 Lily vocal released on April 19, 2012. This contains two vocals ("V3 Lily; Native" and "V3 Lily"), the package was released to address issues with the first package.

=== Luo Tianyi ===
A Chinese Mandarin female vocal released by Shanghai He Nian based on the voice of Shan Xin. She was released on July 12, 2012. A Japanese version of her vocal was recorded for intended use, but was then dropped.

=== V3 Gackpoid ===
An update to the original Vocaloid2 "Gackpoid" vocal. This package contains 3 new vocals ("native", "power" and "whisper") and was released on July 13, 2012.

=== Galaco ===
Released originally as a prize for those in the Yamaha Shop contest, Galaco could be won if a producer gained 1,000 views on their video. She was originally worked upon by developers from Internet co., Ltd and was awarded on August 5, 2012. She is based on the voice of Kou Shibasaki. When a non-expiring code could not be released for the original voice, an update called "Galaco Neo" was released. This contained two vocals ("red" and "blue"), including an updated version of the original prize vocal ("red"). The update was developed by Stardust Music Inc. and released on August 5, 2014.

=== VY2v3 ===
An update on the Vocaloid2 "VY2" vocal. This update contained two vocals ("Standard" and "Falsetto") and was released on October 19, 2012. It was given a second edition called "VY2v3 SE", as one of five products that was released in the SE edition range. VY2v3 Neo was later released in October 2013.

=== Mayu ===
Released by Exit Tunes on December 5, 2012, Mayu is based on vocal samples of Mayumi Morinaga.

=== Avanna ===
A female English vocal and the only released by Zero-G for the Vocaloid 3 engine. She was released on December 22, 2012, and in Japan in April 2013. She is designed to be a Celtic-style singer.

Her most notable use was by Porter Robinson in the Worlds album, where she was used for several songs including "Sad Machine".

=== Kaito V3 ===
Kaito V3 was an updated vocal on the original Vocaloid vocal with 4 new vocals included 3 of which were Japanese ("straight", "soft" and "whisper") and one was English. The package was released on February 15, 2013, by Crypton Future Media and came with a software called "Piapro Studio".

=== Zola Project ===
A package containing 3 Japanese male vocals, Yuu, Kyo, Wil voiced by Minorun (Yuu), Nanox (Kyo) and Maui (Wil). They were released on June 20, 2013. Zola Project Neo was released on September 19, 2013. Yoshitaka Amano who previously had been an artist for the Final Fantasy series had been chosen as the illustrator for the package. The trio was designed to give producers a tool for creating songs that had been inaccessible up until that point. Zola Project were designed to offer the highest quality vocal possible and be accessible for both new and experienced Vocaloid users. Zola Project offered supporting roles for trio and duos, as well as harmonies. The boxart was designed as an "image illustration" and not "character designs" like the boxart for other Vocaloid releases. The voice providers who were sampled were given a different script to read from other vocals recorded and in addition received a half a years worth of vocal training before being recorded. The 3 providers who were chosen for the project were picked from 40 possible candidates. The product also came with a special plug-in for Vocaloid 3 called ""ZOLA_Unison" which is designed to help them sing together.

=== Yanhe ===
A Chinese Mandarin-language female vocal released by Shanghai He Nian on July 11, 2013, voiced by Seira Ryu.

Liu Seira was asked to voice a male vocal and was originally intended to be the voice provider for VOCALOID CHINA supporting character, Zhiyu Moke. However, Yamaha was forced to remove the character rights from Shanghai He Nian. The president of Shanghai He Nian, Ren Li, spent the money set aside for the character in a prostitute house instead. This ended the "VOCALOID CHINA PROJECT" until 2014 when the company repurchased the rights from Yamaha and ended collaboration with Bplats entirely. As a result of his actions, Ren Li retired in 2015 officially, though had actually been fired from his position. Information on the events remained silent because Ren Li threatened legal action against those who knew what had happened to the VOCALOID CHINA PROJECT, and it was only after he left that the story of the events related to Yanhe's release became known.

=== Hatsune Miku V3 ===
Hatsune Miku had two releases for the Vocaloid 3 software. The first was a new English vocal released on August 31, 2013. The second release was an update on the Vocaloid 2 vocal, it contained 5 vocals, 4 of which were updated versions of 4 of the 6 Hatsune Miku append package vocals ("sweet", "dark", "solid", "soft"). There were two versions of the software released, one with and one without the English version included. It was released on September 26, 2013. Like Kaito before her, she also came with Piapro Studio. The missing vocals from the Append package ("light" and "vivid") were originally offered for free as part of an early promo for those who had the Vocaloid 2 version and the Vocaloid 3 version of the Hatsune Miku vocals. They were later sold separately on the Japanese version of the on-line store Sonicwire.

In addition to the software, a small keyboard-like device known as "Pocket Miku" saw commercial release containing this voice. Originally the device was set to hold the VY1 voice, but was changed for Miku before the developers felt that only her voice would do.

=== Yohioloid ===
Yohioloid was released by PowerFX and Vocatone on September 10, 2013. The package contained 2 vocals based on Yohio, one in English and Japanese.

=== Maika/Ona ===
The third Spanish vocal released for the Vocaloid 3 software. This was a female vocal released on December 18, 2013, under the name of "Maika". She was released for both Mac and Windows versions of the software. (Ona is a Catalan vocal used for Vocaloid concerts in Spain, and uses Maika's voicebank) The retail version has a customized version of the Spanish library, with extra phonetic sounds included that allowed her to mimic sounds from other languages such as English, Portuguese and Japanese. However, as she is still primary focused on Spanish these sounds may not sound as natural as a vocal built for that language would.

=== Merli ===
Merli was the second female Japanese vocal released by i-Style Project and was released on December 24, 2013. It is based on the voice of Misaki Kamata, Merli was designed to be the "sister" of Aoki Lapis. She was released for both Mac and Windows versions of the Vocaloid 3 software.

=== Macne Nana ===
Macne Nana was released by MI7 Japan Inc. based on the voice of Haruna Ikezawa. She sings in Japanese and English. She was developed to work for both Mac and Windows versions of the Vocaloid 3 software. Macne Nana was the first member of the Macne series to be released on Vocaloid. She was released on January 31, 2014.

=== Meiko V3 ===
Meiko V3 was an update on the original Vocaloid vocal. The package contained 5 vocals, one of which was English while the other 4 were Japanese ("straight", "power", "dark" and "whisper"). The packaged was released on February 4, 2014, by Crypton Future Media. She also came with Piapro studio. Her "Power" vocal was previously not set for release as it had similar qualities issues to the original Kagamine Rin/Len vocals. However, when they tried it out on the new Vocaloid 3 engine, they found due to the higher quality of sound "Power" now was suitable to go into production.

=== Kokone ===
Originally, Internet co., Ltd attempted to produce a Megpoid Falsetto vocal, but despite their best efforts switching between Megpoid vocals mid-song, the changes were always too obvious. Kokone was developed instead and was specifically designed to be able to cover a Falsetto range. It was released on February 14, 2014.

=== Anon & Kanon ===
A pair of twin sisters that sing in Japanese, Anon & Kanon were released on March 3, 2014.

=== V Flower ===
Released on May 9, 2014, the package mascot is simply called "Flower". She is a Japanese female vocal designed to be a powerful, androgynous voice and specialize in rock music.

=== Tohoku Zunko ===
Based on the voice of Satomi Sato, she is a Japanese vocal released on June 5, 2014. She was designed to promote the Tōhoku region after the 2011 Tōhoku earthquake and tsunami disaster. Tōhoku region based companies can use her for advertisements and dōjin works. She was originally released as a Voiceroid product, her Vocaloid vocal was developed following a successful crowd funding campaign was held to raise ¥5,000,000 by July 20, 2013.

=== Rana ===
Released by We've Inc based on the voice of Ai Kakuma on September 9, 2014, through Vocalo-P ni Naritai magazine. Users who bring every issue of the Magazine and register all tickets within the magazines would be allowed access to her voice permanently. She is a Japan exclusive vocal and requires a Japanese mailing address to register her voice.

=== V3 Gachapoid ===
A update to the original "Gachapoid" vocal released for the Vocaloid 2 software. It was released for download only on September 17, 2014. Unlike other Vocaloid 2 updates from Internet Co., Ltd, Gachapoid did not receive new vocals and only had his original voice updated. The vocal was updated as part of the 40th anniversary celebration of Fuji TV's broadcast of Gachapin.

=== Chika ===
Chika was a Japanese female voice released by Internet co., Ltd. She is based on the voice of Chiaki Ito (AAA) and was released on October 16, 2014. She has 200 extra triphonetic sounds more than past Internet Co., Ltd Japanese Vocals giving her vocal smoother results.

=== Xin Hua ===
A Mandarin Chinese female vocal who was released on February 10, 2015. She is voiced by Wang Wenyi. Unlike the previous Chinese VOCALOIDs, her origins trace back to Taiwan rather than Mainland China.

=== Yuezheng Ling ===
A Chinese Mandarin female vocal who was released on July 17, 2015. She is voiced by Qi Inory. She is also the first vocal that has her library released after the restart of the Vsinger(formerly VOCALOID China) project.

=== Zhanyin Lorra ===
A Chinese Mandarin female vocal that was in development. She is voiced by Gui Shen Ren.

Though the project was in development, news came in Feb 2016 that the company that owned her character left the project, and that if another company was willing to pick her up, she could be released.

=== Akikoloid-chan ===
A private vocal developed for use by Lawson, she is based on the voice of Arimoto.

=== Ueki-loid ===
He is based on the voice of the deceased singer Hitoshi Ueki and was developed as a technical demonstration of the Vocaloid software.

=== Ring Suzune/Hibiki Lui ===
Ring Suzune (codenamed "VFS-01R") and Hibiki Lui (codenamed "VFS-01L") were a female and male vocaloid pair that were originally announced for the Vocaloid 3 software. Ring was featured promptly in many Vocaloid 3 promotional merchandise. They were being developed by a new company called VocaNext, a Doujin circle. The voice of MiKA (Daisy x Daisy) was chosen for Ring, but despite demos and original songs of her voice being released, information on Ring eventually ceased and her company's website vanished.

=== Megurine Luka V3 ===
An unreleased update for Megurine Luka. This would later be released for Vocaloid 4. During the brief period her V3 website was up, the listed vocals being created for her were; Japanese/Power/Soft/Cute/Whisper/Closed/English.

== Critical reception ==
When reviewing Yohioloid, the Vocaloid 3 software was given a 7/10 by Hollin Jones of the website MusicTech. Jones in his review noted that despite it being "easy to use" the software had a steep learning curve and investing time and effort was the only way to get results. However, when listing off the pros and cons of the software he did note that Vocaloid was as close to realism that one can get, but he noted it was better as a backup singer. He noted that there was still a great deal of artificiality to the sound and it is not possible to get Vocaloid to mimic a singer like Adele. He felt the Vocaloid software was more aimed at an electronic pop genre and in regards to the Yohioloid vocal itself perhaps aimed at a Japanese market despite the fact Yohioloid was a western built Vocaloid.

It was also noted that for English vocaloids Oliver and Avanna, though they were completed a significant delay was reported by studios between the completion of their developments and release. In regards to Avanna, at one point it appeared Zero-G themselves did not know when she was going to be released. Another issue was that Avanna's originally concept was of an Elf as Avanna was aimed to be a fantasy theme vocal, but this was rejected by Yamaha themselves in favour of an anime style of artwork. Previously they had not shown any signs of directing the studios towards one particular direction. The artist of the illustration for Avanna also theorized this had something to do with the large negative reaction that followed the original concept for Spanish vocals Bruno and Clara.

Hatsune Miku remained the most popular vocal for the software. Upon release she overloaded the yamaha server as users made activation requests. As well as this, a backlog of 10,000 copies of her software was reported at one stage as supplies failed to meet the demand. The Hatsune Miku v3 product was credited for an increase of Vocaloid related sales by 19.7% in 2014.

Sales for English Vocals also picked up and Avanna became the most successful Zero-G Vocaloid ever sold, holding their no.1 "Best Seller" spot for 2013 and the first Vocaloid by Zero-G to ever claim their no.1 spot. Her vocal would later go on to repeat this in the following years of 2014. She also claimed the no.1 spot for a 3rd year in 2015, but was closely challenged by Vocaloid 4 vocals "Dex" and "Daina".

IA also proved a highly successful vocal and by July 2015, had 100 million views across all the related videos of her.

Not all Vocaloid3 releases were highly successful, more so then Vocaloid2 releases. In 2014, Crypton Future Media's website Sonicwire gave sales results for 2014, the top rankings contained a mixture of Vocaloid2 and Vocaloid3 releases. The mixed result was not just restricted to vocal package Crypton had developed itself, but reflected in also other studios, as evidence by both "Big Al", a Vocaloid2 vocal by PowerFX, being on the chart alongside Yohioloid, a Vocaloid3 product also by PowerFX. In 2015, the trend changed in favour of Vocaloid3 vocals, but the chart was topped by Vocaloid4 products.
