= Vocaloid 4 =

2014 singing voice synthesizer

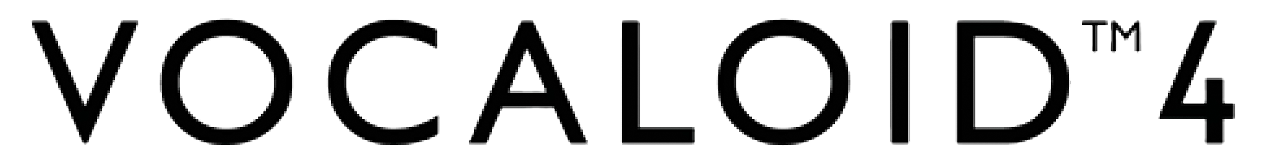

- Vocaloid 4 on Windows 10
- Original author: Yamaha Corporation
- Developer: Yamaha Corporation
- Release: December 17, 2014
- Stable release: 4.3.0 / October 25, 2016
- Operating system: Microsoft Windows macOS
- Predecessor: Vocaloid 3
- Successor: Vocaloid 5
- Available in: Japanese, English, Spanish, Korean, Chinese
- Type: Voice Synthesizer Software
- License: Proprietary
- Website: www.vocaloid.com/en/products/show/v4e_en

Vocaloid 4 (Note: Japanese: ＶＯＣＡＬＯＩＤ４. (while Yamaha uses the latin alphabet to write the official name, it unofficially uses "ボーカロイド" (Bōkaroido) in katakana within its documentation and press releases in Japanese).) is a singing vocal synthesizer and successor to Vocaloid 3 in the Vocaloid series. It was succeeded by Vocaloid 5.

== History ==
In October 2014, the first Vocaloid confirmed for the Vocaloid 4 engine was the English vocal Ruby. Its release was delayed so it could be released on the newer engine. A Vocaloid 4 version for Cubase on OS X has also been released. All AH-Software vocals were announced as receiving updated packages as well as VY1v4. The update of the AH-Software Vocaloid 2 vocals is related to Windows 10 being released in 2015, and the impact it may have on the Vocaloid 2 software.

The Vocaloid 4 engine allows the importing of Vocaloid 2 and Vocaloid 3 vocals, though Vocaloid 2 vocals must have already been imported into Vocaloid 3 for this to work. The new engine includes other features, but not all of them are accessible by Vocaloid 2 and Vocaloid 3 vocals. One of the new features is a "Growl" feature which allows vocals built for Vocaloid 4 to take on a growl-like property in their singing results. Cross-synthesis was also added, allowing the user to switch between two of a character's vocals built for the same language smoothly using a time-varying parameter. This feature is accessible when using Vocaloid 3 and Vocaloid 4 vocals, but not Vocaloid 2. Cross-synthesis only works with vocals from the same character, making use of packages like VY1v4 possible, but not packages such as Anon and Kanon. Another feature included is Pitch Rendering, which all imported vocals can use. This displays the effective pitch curve on the user interface. Finally, real-time input has been included in this version and is another feature which all vocals can use. VSQX files made in Vocaloid 3 work on Vocaloid 4, but they will lose data if loaded the other way around.

For Japanese users who had bought Vocaloid 3, Vocaloid 3 Editor, Vocaloid Editor for Cubase or VY1v3, Yamaha offered a free upgrade for each software. Those who bought the editor after November 10, 2014, were also offered a free upgrade until June 2015. Those who wished to use Vocaloid on a Macintosh, however were offered only the Vocaloid Editor for Cubase as an option; use of the Vocaloid editor on Mac as a normal Vocaloid 4 adaption was not offered.

One of the highlights of the cross-synthesis function is that it can produce very different results depending on which vocals are mixed. Megpoid V4's two vocals "Native" and "NativeFat" will not produce much difference between them. However, by mixing Megpoid V4 vocals "Power" and "Sweet" the function will produce a very different result.

When it was first released, it was only available in Japanese or English, despite being fully capable of using Chinese, Korean, or Spanish vocals from Vocaloid 3. This was similar to how with the original Vocaloid software functioned, in that its interface was only in English, despite having vocals for other languages. Despite the release of Vocaloid 4, Chinese vocals Yuezheng Ling and Zhanyin Lorra were also developed as releases intended for Vocaloid 3.

For the voice "Cyber Diva", some long-term bugs were fixed and pronunciations addressed. English Vocaloid libraries now use a new shorter, more effective script. A custom library was made for the vocal, the largest ever made, which caused an issue with the dictionary proxy that was addressed. English vocals now have more clarity, at the price of expressive tones. Due to the mislabeling of certain phonetic symbols, all past English built vocals were reported to have incorrect sounds assigned to certain symbols; this has been addressed with the new script.

Several adaptations of the Vocaloid 4 have been released. A Mobile version of the editor was released in 2015. Another adaption of the software came in the form of "Unity with Vocaloid", a version of the engine which allowed it to synthesis vocals in real-time within the Unity Engine. The job plug-in "Vocalistener" also received an upgrade, with an upgrade offer for Vocaloid 3 version owners offered.

Vocaloid 4 was the last version released under Hideki Kenmochi, as he announced his retirement on January 30, 2015. Vocaloid has continued its development. He was replaced by Katsumi Ishikawa.

In addition to the Vocaloid 4, the software itself also saw use in the Vocaloid Keyboard, which had first been announced in 2012, though prototypes of the Keyboard were finally unveiled in mid-2015 though did not see commercial release.

== Products ==
=== VY1v4 ===
The latest version of the VY1 product, VY1v4 contains 4 voices, "Natural", "Normal", "Power" and "Soft." VY1v4 was released on December 17, 2014, for both PC and Mac operating systems. Those who bought the previous version were offered an upgrade discount which was included on the Vocaloid shop.

=== Cyber Diva ===
Cyber Diva is an American-accented female vocal released on February 4, 2015.

A version of this vocal was also added to the Mobile Vocaloid Editor app, making it the first English vocal for the app at the time of release, and for quite a while the only vocal on the English app. Despite this, the app was still using a Japanese interface at the time of release.

=== Yuzuki Yukari V4 ===
An update on the Vocaloid 3 product "Yuzuki Yukari", this update, released March 18, 2015, contains three vocals, "Jun", "Onn" and "Lin". "Jun" being a faithful recreation of the previous vocal, "Onn" being a soft-type vocal, and "Lin" being a power-type vocal. The vocals can be purchased individually or as a complete package. In addition, it was announced that all three vocals were would be released for the "Unity with Vocaloid" version.

All three vocals also appeared on the Mobile Vocaloid Editor app, each sold separately.

The Yuzuki Yukari voice was later developed into the Vocaloid Keyboard.

=== Megurine Luka V4X ===
An update on the Vocaloid 2 product "Megurine Luka" that was released March 19, 2015, on both PC and Mac. It comes with four Japanese vocals, "Soft" and "Hard", as well as Enhanced Voice Expression Control (EVEC), plus two English vocals, "Straight" and Soft. The EVEC system adds options to change the tones of the Japanese vocals "Soft_EVEC" and "Hard_EVEC" to nine additional Japanese tones: "Power 1", "Power 2", "Native", "Whisper", "Dark", "Husky", "Soft", "Falsetto" and "Cute". "SOFT_EVEC" and "Hard EVEC" can be used for cross-synthesis (XSY), giving Luka four possible XSY vocals for Japanese, and two for English. The vocal is based on breath.

=== Gackpoid V4 ===
An update of the V3 Gackpoid product announced on March 31, 2015, and released on April 30, 2015.

=== Nekomura Iroha V4 ===
An update on the Vocaloid 2 product. The voice comes with two libraries: "Natural" and "soft". Released June 18, 2015.

=== SF-A2 miki V4 ===
An update on the Vocaloid 2 product. Released June 18, 2015.

=== V4 Flower ===
An update of the V Flower vocal released for Vocaloid 3. Released on July 16, 2015. Those who bought the previous version were offered an upgrade discount, which was included on the Vocaloid shop.

=== Sachiko ===
Sachiko is a Japanese female Vocaloid from Yamaha, released on July 27, 2015. The voice actor is the Enka singer Sachiko Kobayashi. It came with a special plug-in for Vocaloid 4 called "Sachikobushi". This adjusts VSQx files to produce a voice like Kobayashi's.

This vocal was later also added to the Mobile Vocaloid editor app.

=== ARSloid ===
ARSloid was announced in June 2015, and released on September 23, 2015. It is a male vocal based on the singer Akira Kano from Arsmagna. Product comes with three vocals, "Original", "Soft" and "Bright", allowing cross-synthesis to be used.

=== Ruby ===
An American female English vocal developed by independent developer "Prince Syo" in collaboration with Anders of VOCATONE and distributed by PowerFX Systems AB. was released on October 7, 2015.

=== Kaai Yuki V4 ===
An update on the Vocaloid 2 product released on October 29, 2015. Due to the original voice actor maturing, a new actor was used for this product to make the new samples needed to complete the vocal library.

=== Hiyama Kiyoteru V4 ===
An update on the Vocaloid 2 product, includes the "Natural" and "rock" Voicebanks; released on October 29, 2015.

=== Megpoid V4 ===
The update to the Megpoid software. There are a total of 10 vocals for this package, the first five, Native, Adult, Whisper, Sweet, and Power are updates on the old Vocaloid3 versions. The last five are new vocals and consist of Nativefat, MellowAdult, PowerFat, NaturalSweet, and SoftWhisper. Megpoid V4 was released as "complete package" with all ten vocals, or as one of five separate packages with a pair of vocals in each.

The five packages are;

- Native, containing the vocals "Native" and "NativeFat"
- Adult, containing the vocals "Adult" and "MellowAdult"
- Power, containing the vocals "Power" and "PowerFat"
- Sweet, containing the vocals "Sweet" and "NaturalSweet"
- Soft, containing the vocals "Soft" and "SoftWhisper"

The vocals supplied in each package are especially designed to be cross-synthesis friendly, producing the best results such as "Native" and "NativeFat". However, vocals used with one package when used with the function with vocals from another package produce a very different result. So mixing "Power" and "Sweet" will be almost the equivalent of another vocal library entirely.

Released on November 5, 2015.

The voice was also featured in use on the Vocaloid Keyboard prototype.

Megpoid English is also currently in consideration for an update. Development currently unscheduled but estimated to begin in 2016 or 2017.

=== Dex ===
Dex is a male American-accented Vocaloid by Zero-G, and partner to Daina, based on a hound theme and pop-orientation. In March 2015, Zero-G stated that they hoped to release an American male and female VOCALOID4 by the end of May, but delays pushed the release of Dex back to November 20, 2015.

Dex was also sold for the Mac version of the software, a first for Zero-G Vocaloid software.

=== Daina ===
Daina is a female American-accented Vocaloid by Zero-G and the partner vocal to Dex. It is based on a fox theme and is pop-orientated. Released on November 20, 2015.

Daina was also sold alongside Dex for the Mac version of the software, a first for Zero-G Vocaloid software.

=== Rana V4 ===
Rana was also announced for an upgrade at "The Voc@loid M@ster 33" event. The first 100 visitors to the "Rana Experience" booth were given the chance to obtain Rana V4 early access.

Rana's Vocaloid4 version was released on the 1 December 2015. This voice is identical to the Vocaloid3 version, except for the addition of a growl function. Those who had registered all 30 issues in the magazine Vocalo-P ni Naritai (ボカロPになりたい！) version were offered an upgrade discount on the Vocaloid shop.

=== Kagamine Rin/Len V4X ===
An update on the Vocaloid 2 product "Kagamine Rin/Len" was released in Q3, 2015 for both PC and Mac. The vocals are based on tension and strength while being able to control power. They also both come with an English Voicebank. On August 31, 2015, their homepage was launched, confirming their "V4X" status and their use of E.V.E.C.

The package contains updates on the original Vocaloid2 Append vocals ("Power", "Warm" and "Sweet" for Rin and "Power", "Cold and "Serious for Len), with improvements. E.V.E.C. is only possible with their "Power" vocals, in comparison to the past Luka package, only options "Soft" and "Power" are given.

In addition to the main package a separate English vocal package was produced for Kagamine Rin and Len. The package contains natural-sounding vocals for creation of English. They are currently being sold as an expansion pack and are sold bundled with the Kagamine Rin/Len V4X package, or on their own with only the "lite" version of the Vocaloid4 engine.

There have been many comments on the close similarities between Luka's English vocals and Len's English vocals. Both Rin and Len's English vocals are softer and less defined than their Japanese sounds.

The release date was 24 December 2015.

=== Unity-chan; Kohaku Otori/AKAZA ===
The Unity-Chan is a feminine Japanese vocal voiced by Japanese novice voice actress Kakumoto Asuka. Unlike previous software, it has two mascots for the single vocal, Kohaku and AKAZA. They were released on the 14 January 2016 for the Unity Engine version of the software "Unity with Vocaloid". A special version of the package called "『C89特別仕様 『VOCALOID4 Library unity-chan!』PROJECT:AKAZA スペシャルパッケージ』" was sold at the COMIKET 89 booth.

They were also released for the Mobile Vocaloid Editor.

They have special licensing terms. For use of their vocal within projects, the voice will be provided for free as long as a 10 million yen consultation fee is paid. For other public uses of the vocal, a Vocaloid engine fee is required. Due to the Yamaha royalty system, users will have to seek consultation with third parties for use with Vocaloid and other companies' vocals.

=== Fukase ===
Fukase is a Japanese and English male Vocaloid whose voice was provided by Satoshi Fukase (深瀬 慧, Fukase Satoshi).

It was released on January 28, 2016, with three vocals: "Normal", "Soft", and "English". This package also comes with a plug-in for Vocaloid 4 called "Electric Tune" which allows the user to add distinct pitching effects to the voice, such as a robotic sound. It also includes a booklet with information about how to operate the VOCALOID4 editor and Fukase's vocal using Sekai No Owari's song "Starlight Paradise".

Fukase's license agreement requires permission before it may be used in commercial products.

=== Xingchen ===
Xingchen (星尘), known under the English name "Stardust", is a female Chinese vocal released on April 13, 2016. It was developed by Shanghai HENIAN, voiced by Chalili, and the character was conceptualized as "Quadimensionko", a mascot for the Quadimension album series and group.

=== Otomachi Una ===
A Japanese Vocaloid voiced by the Japanese voice actress Aimi Tanaka. It comes with a "sweet" type vocal called "Sugar" and a "powerful" type called "Spicy".

=== Hatsune Miku V4X ===
On August 31, 2015, the title of the Hatsune Miku update was revealed. It was released August 31, 2016, nine years after the original Vocaloid 2 release. Like Megurine Luka V4X and Kagamine Rin/Len V4X, it has E.V.E.C. capabilities. It has seven voice-banks "Original", "Solid", "Dark", "Soft", "Sweet", "English", and "Chinese". "Original", "Solid", and "Soft" contain the E.V.E.C. colors and Power~Soft. The English voice-bank is meant to resemble a mixture of the retired append, "vivid", and "Original". As such, it sounds drastically different than the previous English vocal. It can be purchased in a bundle, or as a separate purchase similar to her V3 release and Kagamine Rin/Len V4X.

A seventh vocal, "Chinese (Mandarin)", was released on September 5, 2017.

=== Uni ===
Uni is a Korean female Vocaloid created by ST MEDiA that was released in February 2017. It had two expansion vocals in development, "Power" and "Soft" and an English package planned after the completion of these expansions. ST MEDIA has not given any insight on these voicebanks and they are assumed cancelled.

=== Yuezheng Longya ===
A Chinese Mandarin male vocal released May 10, 2017. It is voiced by the Chinese voice actor, Zhang Jie.

=== Luo Tianyi V4 ===
Tianyi's update production was officially announced on March 12, 2015, and released on July 15, 2016. In the V4 version, it received a complete re-record of previous lines, and one additional line.

Development on a Japanese voicebank for Luo Tianyi was confirmed to have been restarted on June 19, 2017. It was released on May 18, 2018.

=== Cyber Songman ===
A complementary male vocal for Cyber Diva, released in October 2016.

=== Tohoku Zunko V4 ===
A VOCALOID4 update for Tohoku Zunko was released on October 27, 2016.

=== Macne Nana V4 ===
An update to Macne Nana Japanese and English was released December 15, 2016, along with a new Vocaloid, Macne Petit. Like Macne Nana, Macne Petit was ported to Vocaloid following its performance on other platforms.

=== Tone Rion V4 ===
An update to Vocaloid 3 vocal Tone Rion was released February 16, 2017. It is voiced by Nemu Yumemi, who also voices associated Vocaloid Yumemi Nemu.

=== Yumemi Nemu ===
A complementary feminine vocal to Tone Rion was released February 16, 2017. Yumemi Nemu's voice provider and namesake is Nemu Yumemi of Dempagumi.inc.

=== Masaoka Azuki V4 ===
A public release of Private V2 Mobile vocal, Azuki, was released on July 12, 2017.

=== Kobayashi Matcha V4 ===
A public release of Private V2 Mobile vocal, Matcha, was released on July 12, 2017.

=== LUMi ===
A new Vocaloid by the upcoming company, Akatsuki Virtual Artists, named LUMi was released on August 30, 2017.

=== Xin Hua V4 ===
An update to Vocaloid 3 Xin Hua was released on September 1, 2017, with a Japanese Vocal being released on September 22, 2017.

=== Kizuna Akari ===
A Japanese Voiceroid 2 and Vocaloid produced by VOCALOMAKETS, part of AH-Software. The Vocaloid package was released on April 26, 2018.

=== Mirai Komachi ===
A new Vocaloid named Mirai Komachi was made by the company Bandai Namco Studio Inc, which was released on May 24, 2018.

=== Zhiyu Moke ===
A Mandarin Chinese Vocaloid developed by Vsinger. It is voiced by Shangqing Su. The vocal was demonstrated live on June 17, 2017, and was later released alongside Mo Qingxian on August 2, 2018.

Its design was originally unveiled in 2012, following an official contest.

=== Mo Qingxian ===
A Mandarin Chinese Vocaloid developed by Vsinger. It is voiced by Mingyue. The vocal was demonstrated live on June 17, 2017, and was later released alongside Zhiyu Moke on August 2, 2018.

The design was originally unveiled in 2012, following an official contest.

== Critical reception ==
In 2015, Zero-G reported that Dex and Daina achieved high download numbers.

Crypton Future Media's download website "Sonicwire" reported that the Megurine Luka V4X product had the number 1 position in Vocaloid sales. This would later be overtaken by the Hatsune Miku V4X Bundle.
