= Miss Shachiku and the Little Baby Ghost =

Japanese manga series and its adaptation(s)

- Cover of Shachiku-san wa Yōjo Yūrei ni Iyasaretai volume 1 by Square Enix

社畜さんは幼女幽霊に癒されたい。 (Shachiku-san wa Yōjo Yūrei ni Iyasaretai.)
- Genre: Comedy, supernatural
- Manga
- Written by: Imari Arita
- Published by: Square Enix
- English publisher: NA: Square Enix
- Imprint: Gangan Comics
- Magazine: Monthly Shōnen Gangan; (August 10, 2019 – January 9, 2026)
- Original run: February 2, 2019 – January 9, 2026
- Volumes: 14
- Anime television series
- Directed by: Kū Nabara
- Written by: Deko Akao
- Music by: Satoshi Hōno; Ryūnosuke Kasai
- Studio: Project No.9
- Licensed by: Crunchyroll
- Original network: AT-X, Tokyo MX, BS NTV, BS Fuji
- Original run: April 7, 2022 – June 23, 2022
- Episodes: 12
- icon

Miss Shachiku and the Little Baby Ghost (社畜さんは幼女幽霊に癒されたい。, Shachiku-san wa Yōjo Yūrei ni Iyasaretai.; "The Company Slave Wants to Be Healed by a Little Ghost Girl.") is a Japanese manga series by Imari Arita. It originally began serialization online via Twitter in February 2019. It was then serialized in Square Enix's shōnen manga magazine Monthly Shōnen Gangan from August 2019 to January 2026 and was collected in fourteen tankōbon volumes. An anime television series adaptation by Project No.9 aired from April to June 2022.

== Characters ==
Fushihara-san (伏原さん)
Voiced by: Hisako Kanemoto
Yūrei-chan (幽霊ちゃん)
Voiced by: Rina Hidaka
Myako (みゃーこ, Myāko)
Voiced by: Konomi Kohara
Kurahashi-san (倉橋さん)
Voiced by: Maaya Uchida
Lily (リリィ, Rirī)
Voiced by: Kaori Ishihara
Ryōko (涼子)
Voiced by: Kana Asumi
Shino (志乃)
Voiced by: Ikumi Hasegawa
Kaori (香織)
Voiced by: Marina Inoue
Miko-chan (ミコちゃん)
Voiced by: Yui Ogura
Kon (こん)
Voiced by: Sayaka Kaneko
Konta (こん太)
Voiced by: Shū Natani

== Media ==
=== Manga ===
Written and illustrated by Imari Arita, Miss Shachiku and the Little Baby Ghost began serialization on the author's Twitter account on February 2, 2019. It later began serialization in Square Enix's shōnen manga magazine Monthly Shōnen Gangan from August 10, 2019, to January 9, 2026. Its chapters were collected in fourteen tankōbon volumes released from August 9, 2019, to January 9, 2026.

The manga is published in English on Square Enix's Manga Up! Global app.

No.	Japanese release date	Japanese ISBN
1	August 9, 2019	978-4-7575-6223-3
2	February 12, 2020	978-4-7575-6500-5
3	July 10, 2020	978-4-7575-6679-8
4	December 11, 2020	978-4-7575-6935-5
5	June 11, 2021	978-4-7575-7316-1
6	November 11, 2021	978-4-7575-7565-3
7	April 12, 2022	978-4-7575-7874-6
8	October 12, 2022	978-4-7575-8197-5
9	May 11, 2023	978-4-7575-8566-9
10	December 12, 2023	978-4-7575-8955-1
11	July 11, 2024	978-4-7575-9297-1
12	March 12, 2025	978-4-7575-9732-7
13	January 9, 2026	978-4-301-00270-3
14	January 9, 2026	978-4-301-00271-0

=== Anime ===
An anime adaptation was announced in the July 2021 issue of Monthly Shōnen Gangan published on June 11, 2021. It was later revealed to be a television series produced by Project No.9. Kū Nabara directed the series, with scripts written by Deko Akao, character designs by Haruka Tanaka, and music composed by Satoshi Hōno and Ryūnosuke Kasai. It aired from April 7 to June 23, 2022, on AT-X, Tokyo MX, BS NTV, and BS Fuji. The opening theme song is "Cherish" by Kaori Ishihara, while the ending theme song is "Kikoeru?" ("Can You Hear Me?") by Maaya Uchida. Crunchyroll streamed the series.

==== Episodes ====
No.	Directed by	Written by	Storyboarded by	Original release date
1	Takafumi Hino	Deko Akao	Tomohiro Kamitani	April 7, 2022 (Note: This episode was pre-screened on March 5, 2022.)
One night, while Fushihara is working overtime at the office, she hears a scary voice from out of nowhere, commanding her to leave. She tries to ignore it and get on with her work, but then suddenly her monitor turns to black, with the word "Leave" repeated on it endlessly. When a frustrated Fushihara goes to look for the owner of the scary voice, what does she find but the little baby ghost, Yuurei-chan! When Fushihara explains to her that she can't leave until she finishes her work, the little ghost replies earnestly, "Then I'll help you! So you can leave!"
2	Takanori Yano	Inaho Fujio	Kōji Yoshikawa, Hikaru Takeuchi	April 14, 2022
Despite having a fever, Fushihara is working overtime at the office again today. Taking notice of this, Yuurei-chan yells "You're gonna work yourself to death!" and proceeds to try and persuade Fushihara to leave. When Fushihara tells her that her being there with her motivates her, Yuurei-chan proposes that she go home with her, so that she can finish her work at home. Easily swayed by the ever-so-cute little baby ghost, Fushihara promptly agrees to her proposal and takes her home at once.
3	Akira Katō	Tomoko Shinozuka	Fumiaki Usui	April 21, 2022
When Yuurei-chan appears in the office one night, Fushihara is oddly nowhere to be seen. Yuurei-chan is happy at first to see that Fushihara was able to leave early, but soon realizes that now she feels lonely without her. On top of that, a thunderstorm begins to roar outside. With tears in her eyes, Yuurei-chan tries to convince herself she's not afraid. That she's not lonely. Then moments later, she hears the sound of the office door opening...
4	Tomio Yamauchi	Saji Komori	Noriaki Saitō	April 28, 2022
5	Ryūta Imaizumi	Deko Akao	Yoshihiro Takamoto	May 5, 2022
6	Daisuke Korose	Saji Komori	Daisuke Korose	May 12, 2022
7	Akira Kato	Inaho Fujio	Takehiro Nakayama	May 19, 2022
8	Takanori Yano	Tomoko Shinozuka	Noriaki Saitō, Kōji Kikkawa, Hikaru Takeuchi	May 26, 2022
9	Tomio Yamauchi, Takafumi Hino	Tomoko Shinozuka	Kazuo Miyake, Fumiaki Usui, Takafumi Hino	June 2, 2022
10	Ryuta Imaizumi, Yosuke Fujino	Inaho Fujio	Yosuke Fujino, Kōji Kikkawa, Hikaru Takeuchi	June 9, 2022
11	Takanori Yano	Saji Komori	Noriaki Satō	June 16, 2022
12	Akira Kato	Deko Akao	Kōji Kikkawa, Hikaru Takeuchi	June 23, 2022
