= Maaya Uchida =

Japanese voice actress and singer (born 1989)

- 内田 真礼
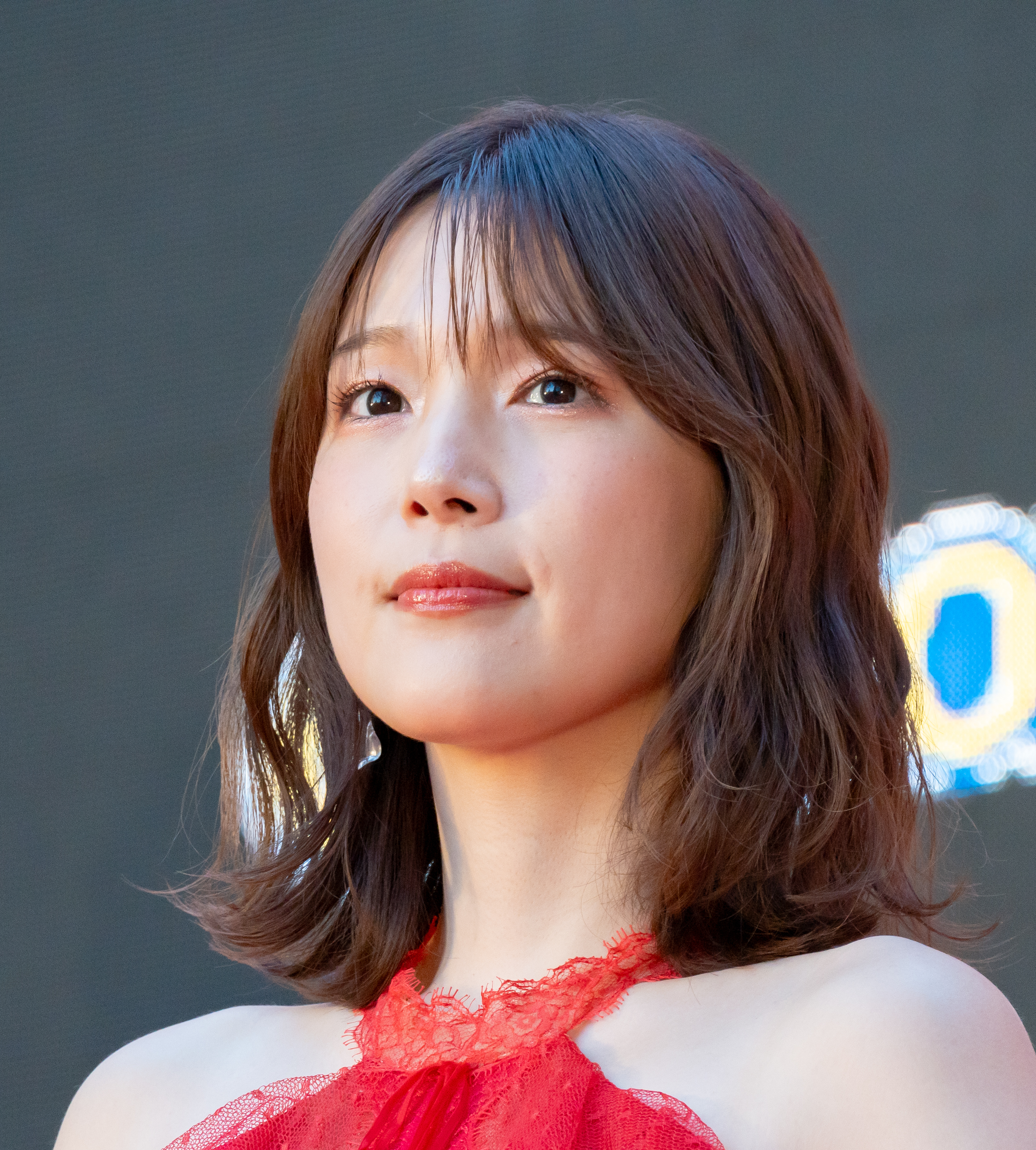
- Uchida at the 36th Tokyo International Film Festival in 2023
- Born: December 27, 1989 (age 36); Tokyo, Japan
- Occupations: Actress; voice actress; singer
- Years active: 2010–present
- Agent: I'm Enterprise
- Notable work: Love, Chunibyo & Other Delusions as Rikka Takanashi; High School DxD as Irina Shido; Noragami as Hiyori Iki; My Next Life as a Villainess: All Routes Lead to Doom! as Catarina Claes
- Spouse: Kaito Ishikawa (m. 2025)
- Relatives: Yuma Uchida (brother); Rina Hidaka (sister-in-law)
- Musical career
- Genres: J-pop; anison; rock
- Instrument: Vocals
- Years active: 2014–present
- Label: Pony Canyon
- Website: www.uchidamaaya.jp

Maaya Uchida (内田 真礼, Uchida Maaya; born December 27, 1989) is a Japanese actress and singer who works for I'm Enterprise. She won the Best Rookie Actress Award at the 8th Seiyu Awards, as well as the Foreign Movie/Series Award at the 19th Seiyu Awards. She is best known for her roles such as Wakana Morizono in Pretty Rhythm: Rainbow Live, Rikka Takanashi in Love, Chunibyo & Other Delusions, Syaro Kirima in Is the Order a Rabbit?, Irina Shido in High School DxD, Hiyori Iki in Noragami, Norman in The Promised Neverland, Ranko Kanzaki in The Idolmaster Cinderella Girls, Catarina Claes in My Next Life as a Villainess: All Routes Lead to Doom!, Shinobu Miyake in Urusei Yatsura (2022) and Angel Devil in Chainsaw Man.

She debuted as a singer in 2014 under Pony Canyon with the song "Soushou Innocence". Her best-selling single is youthful beautiful. With her rising success, she also participated in many music festivals and held one-man lives in large venues such as Yoyogi National Gymnasium two days with 13,291 capacity and Nippon Budokan with 14,471 capacity.

As an actress, she debuted in Unofficial Sentai Akibaranger with the role of Hakase Hiroyo. She is the older sister of fellow voice actor Yuma Uchida.

== Biography ==
While in elementary school, growing up with a family of gamers, she had a strong interest in gaming. At the time she entered middle school and joined the Theater Club, she realized that she wanted to voice game characters and had the profession of being a voice actress. On a third year in high school, she decided to become a voice actress. Afterwards, she went on the internet and read magazines to decide on which university for voice acting she was going to enter and later on decided to join the Japan Narration Acting Institute (日本ナレーション演技研究所 Nihon Narēshon Engi Kenkyūjo).

Uchida completed her studies at narration school in 2009. She became a voice actress in the OVA Boku, Otari-man as an office employee. In April 2010, she joined the voice talent agency, I'm Enterprise.

Uchida admires veteran voice actress, Kikuko Inoue, and is close friends with fellow voice actress and singer, Sumire Uesaka. She is a fan of the baseball team, Fukuoka SoftBank Hawks. Her nicknames include "Mayayan" and "Mareitaso".

In 2011, she made her first appearance in a video game in the game Gal Gun with the role Kaoruko Sakurazaki. In 2012, she voiced Rea Sanka in the anime series Sankarea, and played Hakase Hiroyo in Unofficial Sentai Akibaranger.

Among the works in she appeared, she mentions that the work she especially has strong feelings for is Love, Chunibyo & Other Delusions (as Rikka Takanashi), and the works that were a big challenge in her voice actress career are Charlotte (as Yusa/Misa Nishimori) and Kabaneri of the Iron Fortress (as Ayame).

In 2014, Uchida debuted as a singer with the single Soushou Innocence, under the label Pony Canyon. Same year, she won the Best Rookie Actress Award at the 8th Seiyu Awards. Her first photo book, Maaya (まあや), was released on December 24, 2014.

In 2015, she participated in Animelo Summer Live for the first time. She has continued to participate every year since then, except 2020 (which was canceled).

On December 24, 2017, she announced the opening of her official fan club "LIFE IS LIKE A SUNNY DAY" at Maaya Happy Birthday & Xmas Party!! 2017.

Her second photobook, étoile, was released on March 25, 2019.

On February 7, 2020, she played herself in the live action film Wotakoi: Love Is Hard for Otaku. She made a guest appearance in a detective drama for the first time in the sixth episode of Keishichou Sousa Ichikachou 2020 with the role Rika Oita.

On May 8, 2022, her agency announced that Uchida had tested positive for COVID-19. She returned to work on May 17, 2022.

On December 23, 2022, Uchida participated in the popular Japanese music television program Music Station. She, Kouki Maeda, and Cocomi sang the Japanese version for the Aladdin theme song "A Whole New World".

Uchida released her third photobook, Maaya Doki (まあやドキ), on February 8, 2023. The photobook peaked at 1st place on the Amazon Weekly Talent Photobook Chart and the Oricon Weekly Photobooks Chart. Due to the success, the photobook has gotten 3 reprints. To commemorate the release, Uchida was in charge of the cover and opening gravure of Weekly Young Jump No. 11 released on February 9.

She won the Foreign Movie/Series Award at the 19th Seiyu Awards in 2025. As of September 30, 2025, she is married to Kaito Ishikawa.

== Musical career ==
Uchida made her solo debut in April 2014 under Pony Canyon with her first solo single, "Soushou Innocence" (創傷イノセンス); it peaked at 14th place on the Oricon Weekly Singles Chart and stayed on the chart for 9 weeks. The main song in the single was used as the opening theme song for the anime, Riddle Story of Devil. She released her second single, "Gimme! Revolution" (ギミー!レボリューション) on November 3, 2014; it peaked at 12th place on the Oricon Weekly Single Chart and stayed on the chart for 12 weeks. The titular song from the single was used as the opening theme song for the anime, Gonna be the Twin-Tail!!.

She released her 3rd single, "Karappo Capsule" (からっぽカプセル) on April 1, 2015. The song "Karappo Capsule" from the single was used as the ending theme song for the anime, Comical Psychosomatic Medicine. Her first solo album titled "PENKI" was released on December 2, 2015; it peaked at 6th place on the Oricon Weekly Albums Chart and stayed on the chart for 7 weeks. On February 28, 2016, Uchida held her 1st solo live concert titled "1st LIVE Hello, 1st Contact!" in Nakano Sun Plaza. Her 4th single, "Resonant Heart", was released on May 11, 2016. The titular song in the single was used as the opening theme song for the anime, Seisen Cerberus.

She released her 1st mini album named "Drive-in Theater" on January 11, 2017; the mini album peaked at 6th place on the Oricon Weekly Albums Chart and stayed on the chart for 5 weeks. The album was created with the desire to express her real self. Especially the song Smiling Spiral from the album was made with the purpose of "a cheering song". The album heavily features her hobbies; like Crossfire, a song like a festival song with baseball-like lyrics, Moratorium Dance Floor, which has a Japanese taste and Shiny drive, Moony dive, which is themed on driving. On February 25–26, 2017, she held her 2nd solo live concert in two days, titled "2nd LIVE Smiling Spiral" in Yoyogi National First Gymnasium with over 13,000 capacity. Her 5th single, "+INTERSECT+" was released on June 21, 2017. Her 6th single, "c.o.s.m.o.s" was released on October 25, 2017; it peaked at 6th place on the Oricon Weekly Singles Chart and stayed on the chart for 4 weeks. She held another solo live concert on July 1 and 29, 2017 in Tokyo and Osaka named, "Live 2017 +INTERSECT SUMMER+".

Her 7th single, "aventure bleu" was released on February 14, 2018. The titular song from the single was used as the opening theme song for the anime, Takunomi. Her 2nd album named "Magic Hour" was released on April 25, 2018; it peaked at 7th place on the Oricon Weekly Album Chart and stayed on the chart for 6 weeks. She opened her fanclub in April 2018; named "LIFE IS LIKE A SUNNY DAY". On June 17, 24 and July 1, 2018, she held her first solo live tour titled, "Magic Number TOUR 2018", in Fukuoka, Osaka, and Tokyo. Her 8th and best-selling single, "youthful beautiful", was released on October 17, 2018; it peaked at 7th place on the Oricon Weekly Singles Chart and stayed on the chart for 14 weeks. The titular song from the single was used as the ending theme song for the anime, SSSS.Gridman.

She held her live with the largest capacity (14,471), titled "New Year LIVE 2019 take you take me BUDOKAN!!" on January 1, 2019, in Nippon Budokan. She is the 8th artist to ever hold a solo live on January 1 in Nippon Budokan. She released her 9th single, "Kodou Escalation" (鼓動エスカレーション) on July 10, 2019. The titular song from the single was used as the second ending theme song for the anime, Ace of Diamond Act II. She released her 2nd mini album on October 2, 2019, named "you are here". The album peaked at 9th place on Oricon Weekly Singles Chart and stayed on the chart for 4 weeks. A live tour titled "Zepp Tour 2019 we are here" was held throughout Japan in selected Zepp locations in November and December 2019.

Her 10th single titled "No Scenario" (ノーシナリオ) was released on March 18, 2020. A live titled "LIVE 2020 Live For All Stars" was supposed to be held on July 5, 2020, in Yokohama Arena, but was canceled. Instead, an online live called "Hello, ONLINE contact!" was held on the same day, in Harevutai. Her 11th and double A-side single titled "Heartbeat City/Itsuka Kumo ga Haretanara" (ハートビートシティ／いつか雲が晴れたなら) was released on November 25, 2020.

She released her 12th single "Strobe Memory" (ストロボメモリー) on May 12, 2021. The titular song from the single was used as the ending theme song for the anime, SSSS.Dynazenon. The single peaked at 10th place on Oricon Weekly Singles Chart and stayed on the chart for 8 weeks. She held a live with audience after 1 and a half years titled "LIVE 2021 FLASH FLASH FLASH" on July 3, 2021, in Tachikawa Stage Garden. Her official YouTube channel was opened on September 3, 2021. Her 3rd album, "HIKARI" was released on October 27, 2021.

On February 20 and March 13, 2022, she held a live tour called "LIVE 2022 MA-YA-YAN Happy Cream MAX!!", in Pacifico Yokohama and Grand Cube Osaka. In the Yokohama performance, it was announced that a revival of her 1st live called "Hello, 1st Contact [Revival]" would be held on September 24, 2022, in Culttz Kawasaki. Her 13th single "Kikoeru?" (聴こえる？) was released on April 20, 2022. The titular song from the single was used as the ending theme song for the anime, Miss Shachiku and the Little Baby Ghost. On September 16, 2022, her 1st digital single "CHASER GAME" was released. The titular song from the single was used as the opening theme for the television drama of the same name.

Her 14th single "Loud Hailer" (ラウドヘイラー) was released on January 25, 2023. The titular song from the single was used as the ending theme song for the anime, The Iceblade Sorcerer Shall Rule the World. Starting from September 3, 2023 to October 15, 2023, she will hold a nationwide tour named "UCHIDA MAAYA Live Tour 2023", in six Zepp locations and SENDAI GIGS.

== Filmography ==
=== Anime series ===
Year	Title	Role
2010	Okami-san and Her Seven Companions	Child
2010	The World God Only Knows	Yuri
2011	Wandering Son	Miyake
2011	The Qwaser of Stigmata II	Female Student A (ep 1)
2011	Heaven's Memo Pad	Woman Staff
2011	YuruYuri	Mari
2011	Bunny Drop	Nursery School Worker B
2011	Manyū Hiken-chō	Muramusume
2012	Bodacious Space Pirates	Izumi Yunomoto
2012	Gokujyo	Ai Nanasato
2012	Kimi to Boku 2	High School Girl
2012	Ad-lib Anime Kenkyujo	Kana
2012	Kokoro Connect	Mihashi Chinatsu
2012	Shirokuma Cafe	Kawasouko
2012	Sankarea	Rea Sanka
2012	Kids on the Slope	Girl
2012	YuruYuri 2	Mari
2012	Nakaimo - My Sister Is Among Them!	Yuu
2012	Dog Days'	Lesa Anrobe
2012	Love, Chunibyo & Other Delusions	Rikka Takanashi
2012	K	Chiho Hyuuga
2012	Say "I love you"	Female student
2013	Mangirl!	An Abe
2013	Ai-Mai-Mi	Mii
2013	Maoyu	Maid Girl, Servants
2013	Bakumatsu Gijinden Roman	Okuni
2013	GJ-bu	Mao Amatsuka
2013	Vividred Operation	Rei Kuroki
2013	Pretty Rhythm: Rainbow Live	Morizono Wakana, Kouji
2013	A Certain Scientific Railgun S	Frenda Seivelun
2013	Dog & Scissors	Sakura Honda
2013	High School DxD New	Irina Shidō
2013	Gatchaman Crowds	Hajime Ichinose
2013	Super Seisyun Brothers	Ui Umezono
2013	Outbreak Company	Minori Koganuma
2014	Robot Girls Z	Gecchan
2014	Saki: The Nationals	Toyone Anetai
2014	Noragami	Hiyori Iki
2014	Love, Chunibyo & Other Delusions! -Heart Throb-	Rikka Takanashi
2014	Z/X Ignition	Chitose Aoba
2014	Pretty Rhythm: All Star Selection	Morizono Wakana
2014	Is the Order a Rabbit?	Sharo Kirima
2014	Date A Live II	Kaguya Yamai
2014	Ai-Mai-Mi: Mousou Catastrophe	Mii
2014	Konna Watashitachi ga Nariyuki de Heroine ni Natta Kekka www	Soyogi Alice
2014	Jinsei	Shirakawa Kaori
2014	Rail Wars!	Haruka Koumi
2014	Blue Spring Ride	Futaba Yoshioka
2014	Hunter × Hunter (2011)	Alluka Zoldyck
2014	Gonna be the Twin-Tail!!	Twoerle
2014	Oniku Daisuki! Zeushi-kun	Miito Mika
2014	Argevollen	Namie Portman
2014	Girl Friend Beta	Nao Miyoshi
2015	The Idolmaster Cinderella Girls	Ranko Kanzaki
2015	Uwabaki Cook	Piasu's younger sister
2015	Dog Days"	Lesa Anrobe
2015	Date A Live: Mayuri Judgement	Kaguya Yamai
2015	World Break: Aria of Curse for a Holy Swordsman	Haruka Momochi
2015	Etotama	Doratan
2015	Magical Somera-chan	High School Girl
2015	Hyakka Ryouran: Samurai After	Uesugi Kagekatsu
2015	Food Wars: Shokugeki no Soma	Yūki Yoshino
2015	YuruYuri 3	Funami Mari
2015	Is It Wrong to Try to Pick Up Girls in a Dungeon?	Liliruca Arde
2015	My Love Story!!	Store clerk
2015	High School DxD BorN	Irina Shidō
2015	Yamada-kun and the Seven Witches	Miyabi Itō
2015	Gatchaman Crowds Insight	Hajime Ichinose
2015	The Idolmaster Cinderella Girls 2nd Season	Ranko Kanzaki
2015	Chaos Dragon	Lou Zhenhua
2015	Charlotte	Yusa Nishimori, Misa Kurobane
2015	Gate	Shino Kuribayashi
2015	Is the Order a Rabbit??	Sharo Kirima
2015	Noragami Aragoto	Hiyori Iki
2015	Heavy Object	Lady Vanderbilt
2016	Gate 2nd Season	Shino Kuribayashi
2016	Myriad Colors Phantom World	Koito Minase
2016	Kabaneri of the Iron Fortress	Ayame
2016	The Disastrous Life of Saiki K.	Chisato Mera
2016	Active Raid	Mivv
2016	Ragnastrike Angels	Izuki Kanomiya
2016	Kamisama Minarai: Himitsu no Cocotama	Mush-Mukunyu
2016	Food Wars! Shokugeki no Soma: The Second Plate	Yūki Yoshino
2016	Seisen Cerberus: Ryūkoku no Fatalite	Erin
2016	Brave Witches	Miya Misumi
2017	Chain Chronicle ~The Light of Haecceitas~	Pirika
2017	Battle Girl High School	Urara Hasumi
2017	Food Wars! Shokugeki no Soma: The Third Plate	Yūki Yoshino
2017	Ai-Mai-Mi: Surgical Friends	Mii
2017	The Idolmaster Cinderella Girls Theater	Ranko Kanzaki
2017	Clockwork Planet	Houko Hoshimiya
2017	Sagrada Reset	Michiru
2017	Tsurezure Children	Satsuki Sasahara
2017	Ponkotsu Quest	Kaido
2017	Hina Logi: from Luck & Logic	Mizuki Azuma
2017	Gintama.	Saya
2017	The Idolmaster Cinderella Girls Theater 2nd Season	Ranko Kanzaki
2017	Doraemon	Princess Aare Occana
2017	In Another World with My Smartphone	Elze Silhoueska
2017	Land of the Lustrous	Red Beryl
2017	Sword Oratoria: Is it Wrong to Try to Pick Up Girls in a Dungeon? On the Side	Lilliluka Arde
2018	Slow Start	Hiroe Hannen
2018	Food Wars! Shokugeki no Soma The Third Plate: Totsuki Train Arc	Yūki Yoshino
2018	Takunomi	Makoto Kiriyama
2018	Killing Bites	Eruza Nakanishi
2018	The Disastrous Life of Saiki K. 2	Chisato Mera
2018	Kakuriyo: Bed & Breakfast for Spirits	Suzuran
2018	Cutie Honey Universe	Hurricane Honey
2018	High School DxD Hero	Irina Shidō
2018	Grand Blue	Nanaka Kotegawa
2018	Gegege no Kitaro	Yoko Ishiyama
2018	Rascal Does Not Dream of Bunny Girl Senpai	Nodoka Toyohama
2018	Goblin Slayer	Guild Girl
2018	Sono Toki, Kanojo wa.	Miwako
2018	A Certain Magical Index III	Frenda Seivelun
2019	The Rising of the Shield Hero	Melty Q. Melromarc
2019	Date A Live III	Kaguya Yamai
2019	Bumborg 009	Fusensoise Harnour
2019	Domestic Girlfriend	Rui Tachibana
2019	YU-NO: A Girl Who Chants Love at the Bound of this World	Kanna Hatano
2019	Mix	Otomi Tachibana
2019	The Idolmaster Cinderella Girls Theater Climax Season	Ranko Kanzaki
2019	Hakata Mentai! Pirikarako-chan	Maya
2019	The Helpful Fox Senko-san	Shiro
2019	King of Prism: Shiny Seven Stars	Wakana Morizono
2019	Hangyakusei Million Arthur	Diva Arthur
2019	Z/X Code reunion	Chitose Aoba
2019	Is It Wrong to Try to Pick Up Girls in a Dungeon? II	Lilliluka Arde
2019	Ace of Diamond Act II	Risa Nishino
2019	BEM	Sonia Summers
2019	Assassins Pride	Mule La Mor
2019	Food Wars! Shokugeki no Soma: The Fourth Plate	Yūki Yoshino
2019	The Promised Neverland	Norman
2020	A Certain Scientific Railgun T	Frenda Seivelun
2020	Zoids Wild Zero	Hanna Melville
2020	Infinite Dendrogram	Chelsea
2020	Magia Record: Puella Magi Madoka Magica Side Story	Tsukuyo Amane
2020	Kakushigoto	Ichiko Rokujo
2020	Sakura Wars the Animation	Hatsuho Shinonome
2020	Tamayomi	Kayoko Asai
2020	Food Wars! Shokugeki no Soma: The Fifth Plate	Yūki Yoshino
2020	Is the Order a Rabbit? BLOOM	Sharo Kirima
2020	My Next Life as a Villainess: All Routes Lead to Doom!	Catarina Claes
2020	A.I.C.O. -Incarnation-	Mizuki Ookubo
2020	Akudama Drive	Black Cat, Brother
2020	Is It Wrong to Try to Pick Up Girls in a Dungeon? III	Lilliluka Arde
2020	The Irregular at Magic High School: Visitor Arc	Ayako Kuroba
2021	WIXOSS Diva(A)Live	Rie Kazami
2021	Magia Record: Puella Magi Madoka Magica Side Story - The Eve of Awakening	Tsukuyo Amane
2021	World Witches Take Off!	Miya Misumi
2021	My Next Life as a Villainess: All Routes Lead to Doom! X	Catarina Claes, Alexander, Pochi
2021	Komi Can't Communicate	Hitomi Tadano, Himeko Kishi, Gorimi
2021	The Irregular at Magic High School: Reminiscence Arc	Ayako Kuroba
2022	Princess Connect! Re:Dive Season 2	Maho
2022	Animation x Paralympic: Who Is Your Hero?	Haruka Mayama
2022	Cue!	Nozomi Yuzuka
2022	Magia Record: Puella Magi Madoka Magica Side Story - Dawn of a Shallow Dream	Tsukuyo Amane
2022	The Rising of the Shield Hero Season 2	Melty Q. Melromarc
2022	Miss Shachiku and the Little Baby Ghost	Kurahashi-san
2022	Date A Live IV	Kaguya Yamai
2022	Komi Can't Communicate 2nd Season	Hitomi Tadano, Ryouko Tenjouin, Himeko Kishi, Gorimi
2022	Mahjong Soul Pong	Ichi-hime
2022	Vermeil in Gold	Vermeil
2022	Is It Wrong to Try to Pick Up Girls in a Dungeon? IV	Lilliluka Arde
2022	Bocchi the Rock!	Seika Ijichi
2022	Urusei Yatsura	Shinobu Miyake
2022	The Eminence in Shadow	Nu
2022	Chainsaw Man	Angel Devil
2023	Is It Wrong to Try to Pick Up Girls in a Dungeon? IV Part 2	Lilliluka Arde
2023	The Iceblade Sorcerer Shall Rule the World	Carol Caroline
2023	Doomsday With My Dog Special Edition	Master
2023	Campfire Cooking in Another World with My Absurd Skill	Ninrir
2023	Mix Season 2	Otomi Tachibana
2023	Alice Gear Aegis Expansion	Sitara Kaneshiya
2023	In Another World with My Smartphone 2nd Season	Elze Silhoueska
2023	Skip and Loafer	Yuzuki Murashige
2023	Chronicles of an Aristocrat Reborn in Another World	Rina
2023	Sweet Reincarnation	Ruminiito Aidilichpa
2023	The Most Heretical Last Boss Queen	Stale Royal Ivy
2023	Undead Girl Murder Farce	Nora
2023	Fei Ren Zai	Jiu Yue
2023	Fate/strange Fake: Whispers of Dawn	Francesca Prelati
2023	My Unique Skill Makes Me OP Even at Level 1	Lan
2023	The Eminence in Shadow 2nd Season	Nu
2023	Goblin Slayer II	Guild Girl
2023	The Rising of the Shield Hero Season 3	Melty Q. Melromarc
2023	You Were Experienced, I Was Not: Our Dating Story	Matsumoto-sensei
2023	A Playthrough of a Certain Dude's VRMMO Life	Ayame
2023	Ron Kamonohashi's Forbidden Deductions	Julie
2024	Chained Soldier	Tenka Izumo
2024	Sengoku Youko	Tsukiko
2024	Urusei Yatsura 2nd Season	Shinobu Miyake
2024	Chibi Godzilla Raids Again Season 2	Chibi Minilla
2024	The Irregular at Magic High School Season 3	Ayako Kuroba
2024	Astro Note	Mira Gotokuji
2024	Date A Live V	Kaguya Yamai
2024	Love Is Indivisible by Twins	Naori Jingūji
2024	Is It Wrong to Try to Pick Up Girls in a Dungeon? V	Lilliluka Arde
2025	Grisaia: Phantom Trigger the Animation	Rena
2025	Beheneko: The Elf-Girl's Cat Is Secretly an S-Ranked Monster!	Alicia
2025	Catch Me at the Ballpark!	Kohinata
2025	Lazarus	Christine
2025	A Ninja and an Assassin Under One Roof	Kanon Kusagakure
2025	Onmyo Kaiten Re:Birth Verse	Tsukimiya
2025	Uglymug, Epicfighter	Leeds
2025	Princession Orchestra	Manabi Hakase
2025	Chibi Godzilla Raids Again Season 3	Chibi Minilla
2025	Call of the Night Season 2	Haru Nanakusa
2025	Rascal Does Not Dream of Santa Claus	Nodoka Toyohama
2025	Bad Girl	Aoi Aoyama
2025	The Rising of the Shield Hero Season 4	Melty Q Melromarc
2025	Grand Blue Season 2	Nanaka Kotegawa
2025	Campfire Cooking in Another World with My Absurd Skill Season 2	Ninlil
2025	Si-Vis: The Sound of Heroes	Lukos
2026	Fate/strange Fake	Francesca Prelati
2026	Kunon the Sorcerer Can See	Iko Round
2026	Chained Soldier Season 2	Tenka Izumo
2026	The Holy Grail of Eris	Cecilia Adelbide
2026	Dead Account	Eru Kusaba
2026	Hell's Paradise: Jigokuraku Season 2	Kiyomaru
2026	Kaya-chan Isn't Scary	Chie-sensei
2026	Marika's Love Meter Malfunction	Marika Chitose
2026	Drops of God	Miyabi Shinohara
2026	The World Is Dancing	Kogane
2026	The Insipid Prince's Furtive Grab for the Throne	Elna von Amsberg
2026	Hanaori-san Still Wants to Fight in the Next Life	Meru Tsumugina
2026	Magical Girl Raising Project: Restart	Magical Daisy
2026	Nia Liston: The Merciless Maiden	Sharro White
2026	A Certain Dark Item	Frenda Seivelun
2027	Are You a Landmine, Chihara-san?	Chinatsu Iwakura
2027	Necromancer Isekai: How I Went from Abandoned Villager to the Emperor's Favorite	Matteo
TBA	The Irregular at Magic High School Zoku-hen	Ayako Kuroba

=== Anime films ===
Year	Title	Role
2013	Patema Inverted	Kaho
2013	Love, Chunibyo & Other Delusions: Rikka Version	Rikka Takanashi
2014	New Initial D the Movie Legend 1: Awakening	Natsuki Mogi
2014	Pretty Rhythm: All Star Selection: Prism Show Best Ten	Wakana Morizono
2014	Konna Watashitachi ga Nariyuki de Heroine ni Natta Kekka www	Soyogi Alice
2014	Bodacious Space Pirates: Abyss of Hyperspace	Izumi Yunomoto
2015	Ongaku Shōjo	Himeko
2015	Date A Live: Mayuri Judgement	Kaguya Yamai
2015	New Initial D the Movie Legend 2: Racer	Natsuki Mogi
2016	Shimajirō to Ehon no Kuni ni	Punitan
2016	New Initial D the Movie Legend 3: Dream	Natsuki Mogi
2017	King of Prism: Pride the Hero	Wakana Morizono
2018	Love, Chunibyo & Other Delusions! Take on Me	Rikka Takanashi
2018	Drive Head: Tomika Hyper Rescue Kidō Kyūkyū Keisatsu	Tera
2018	PriPara & Kiratto Pri Chan: Kira Kira Memorial Live	Wakana Morizono
2019	Even if the World Will End Tomorrow	Kotori
2019	Grisaia: Phantom Trigger the Animation	Rena
2019	Is It Wrong to Try to Pick Up Girls in a Dungeon?: Arrow of the Orion	Liliruca Arde
2019	Kabaneri of the Iron Fortress: Unato Decisive Battle	Ayame
2019	Rascal Does Not Dream of a Dreaming Girl	Nodoka Toyohama
2019	Walking Meat	Marin
2020	Goblin Slayer: Goblin's Crown	Guild Girl
2020	BEM: Become Human	Sonia Summers
2020	Monster Strike THE MOVIE	Solomon
2020	Grisaia: Phantom Trigger the Animation Stargazer	Rena
2021	Kakushigoto Movie	Ichiko Rokujo
2022	Zannen na Ikimono Jiten	Usao
2023	Gridman Universe	Hime
2023	The Feast of Amrita	Tamahi
2023	My Next Life as a Villainess: All Routes Lead to Doom! The Movie	Catarina Claes
2023	Rascal Does Not Dream of a Sister Venturing Out	Nodoka Toyohama
2023	Komada: A Whisky Family	Tomoko Kawabata
2023	Rascal Does Not Dream of a Knapsack Kid	Nodoka Toyohama
2024	Bocchi the Rock! Re:	Seika Ijichi
2024	Crayon Shin-chan: Our Dinosaur Diary	Billy (young)
2024	Bocchi the Rock! Re:Re:	Seika Ijichi
2025	Chainsaw Man – The Movie: Reze Arc	Angel Devil
2025	Kimi to Idol Precure♪	Tera
2026	Rascal Does Not Dream of a Dear Friend	Nodoka Toyohama
2026	Grotesqqque	Gorgeous Mika
2027	Eiga Bocchi the Rock! Hoshi no Ashiato	Seika Ijichi

=== Original video animation ===
Year	Title	Role
2010	Boku, Otaryman.	Wedding moderator, Female junior
2012	Holy Knight	Lilith Sugimoto
2012	Sankarea OVA	Rea Sanka
2012	Love, Chunibyo & Other Delusions: DEPTH OF FIELD	Rikka Takanashi
2013	Love, Chunibyo & Other Delusions: Sparkling... Slapstick Noel	Rikka Takanashi
2013	Code Geass: Oz the Reflection Picture Drama	Marrybell mel Britannia
2013	Gokujyo: Souda Onsen ni Ikou!!	Ai Nanasato
2013	High School DxD New OVA	Irina Shidō
2013	Nakaimo - My Sister is Among Them! OVA	Yuu
2013	Date A Live: Date to Date	Kaguya Yamai
2014	Gatchaman Crowds: Embrace	Hajime Ichinose
2014	GJ-bu@	Mao Amatsuka
2014	Tsubu Doll	Minami
2014	Noragami OVA	Iki Hiyori
2014	Ao Haru Ride OVA	Futaba Yoshioka
2014	Yamada-kun and the Seven Witches OVA	Miyabi Itō
2014	Yuru Yuri Nachu Yachumi!	Mari Funami
2014	Chain Chronicle	Pirika, Ninfa
2015	High School DxD BorN OVA	Irina Shidō
2015	Yamada-kun and the Seven Witches x Flunk Punk Rumble Collab Animation	Miyabi Itō
2015	Noragami Aragoto OVA	Iki Hiyori
2015	Dog Days" OVA	Lesa Anrobe
2016	Food Wars!: Shokugeki no Soma OVA	Yoshino Yuuki
2016	Charlotte Special Edition	Yusa Nishimori, Misa Kurobane
2016	Is It Wrong to Try to Pick Up Girls in a Dungeon? OVA	Lilliluka Arde
2016	Myriad Colors Phantom World Special Edition	Koito Minase
2017	My Hero Academia: Training of the Dead	Habuko Mongoose
2017	Is the Order a Rabbit?? ~Dear my Sister~	Sharo Kirima
2019	Is the Order a Rabbit?? ~Sing For You~	Sharo Kirima
2019	Kabaneri of the Iron Fortress: Soshuuhen	Ayame
2020	Is It Wrong to Try to Pick Up Girls in a Dungeon? II OVA	Lilliluka Arde
2021	Alice Gear Aegis: Heart Pounding! Actress Packed Mermaid Grand Prix!	Sitara Kaneshiya
2021	Is It Wrong to Try to Pick Up Girls in a Dungeon? III OVA	Lilliluka Arde
2021	My Next Life as a Villainess: All Routes Lead to Doom! OVA	Catarina Claes
2022	New Initial D Movie: Battle Digest	Natsuki Mogi
2022	Mahjong Soul Pong	Ichi-hime

=== Original net animation ===
Year	Title	Role
2012	Love, Chunibyo & Other Delusions Lite	Rikka Takanashi
2013	Ai Mai Mi	Mi
2013	Super Hyperspace Bulwark Cheese Napolitan	Anzu Mikumo
2014	Nozo × Kimi	Michiru Sonoda
2014	Love, Chunibyo & Other Delusions Heart Throb Lite	Rikka Takanashi
2014	X Maiden	Akamaru Jun
2014	Oniku Daisuki! Zeushi-kun 2nd Season	Miito Mika
2014	Onedari Wanko	Strawberry
2015	Comical Psychosomatic Medicine	Himeru Kangoshi
2015	Robot Girl Z+	Gecchan
2015	Hangyakusei Million Arthur	Diva Arthur
2015	Hantsu × Trash	Chisato Hagiwara
2017	The Relative Worlds	Kotori Izumi, Kotoko
2017	Pokémon Generations	Matiere
2017	Onyankopon	Onyankopon
2017	Fox Spirit Matchmaker	Southern Princess
2018	Moshi Moshi, Terumi Desu	Terumi
2018	A.I.C.O. -Incarnation-	Mizuki Ookubo
2018	Isekai Izakaya "Nobu"	Hermina
2018	Sword Gai: The Animation Part II	Himiko
2018	The Idolmaster Cinderella Girls Theater Extra Stage	Ranko Kanzaki
2018	God Eater Reso Nantoka Gekijou	Tiona Vita Lin Toe
2019	Solomon: The Magic King of Wisdom	Solomon
2019	Monster Strike: End Of The World	Solomon
2019	The Disastrous Life of Saiki K. Reawakened	Chisato Mera
2019	Ano Hi no Kokoro wo Toraete	Michi
2019	The Idolmaster Cinderella Girls Tuesday Cinderella Theater	Ranko Kanzaki
2020	Catarina to Manabou	Catarina Claes
2020	Super Dragon Ball Heroes	Saria
2020	Catarina Nounai Kaigi	Catarina Claes
2021	Etotama: Nyankyaku Banrai	Dora-tan
2021	The Way of the Househusband	Cobalt Police
2021	Catarina Nounai Kaigi X	Catarina Claes
2021	Rainbow Finder	Hitomi
2021	Oni no Hanayome wa Taberaretai	Mashiro
2022	Gugumi-chan	Gugumi-chan
2022	Doomsday With My Dog	Master
2022	Cinderella Girls 10th Anniversary Celebration Animation ETERNITY MEMORIES	Ranko Kanzaki
2023	The Way of the Househusband Season 2	Cobalt Police
2023	Kagejitsu!	Nu
2024	The Grimm Variations	Dog
2026	Devils' Crest	Aria Misono

=== Video games ===
Year	Title	Role
2011	Akiba's Trip	Sena Kitada
2011	Gal Gun	Kaoruko Sakurazaki
2011	Dead End: Orchestral Manoeuvres in the Dead End	Kanagi Toin
2012	Akiba's Trip Plus	Sena Kitada
2012	Girl Friend Beta	Nao Miyoshi, Sharo
2012	Ciel Nosurge	Nay
2012	PangYa	Spika
2013	The Idolmaster Cinderella Girls	Ranko Kanzaki
2013	Tears to Tiara II: Heir of the Overlord	Artio
2013	Chain Chronicle	Pirika, Reflette, Lilliluka Arde, Shinonome Hatsuko etc.
2013	Drakengard 3	Zero
2013	Vividred Operation: Hyper Intimate Power	Rei Kuroki
2013	Pretty Rhythm	Wakana Morizono
2014	Ar Nosurge	Nay
2014	Disgaea 4: Return	Nagi Clockwork
2014	Final Fantasy XIV: A Realm Reborn	Iceheart/Saint Shiva
2014	Kai-Ri-Sei Million Arthur	Diva Arthur
2014	Hyperdevotion Noire: Goddess Black Heart	Ester
2014	Date A Live: Arusu Install	Kaguya Yamai
2014	Puzzle & Dragons Battle Tournament	Riona Okita
2014	SHORT PEACE: Ranko Tsukigime's Longest Day	Ranko Tsukigime and other female characters
2014	Phantasy Star Nova	Lutina
2014	Corpse Party: Blood Drive	Magari Mizuki
2014	The Irregular at Magic High School Lost Zero	Mayaka Zerono
2014	Fatal Frame: Maiden of Black Water	Miu Hinasaki
2014	Granblue Fantasy	Ranko Kanzaki, Brunnhilde and Pholia
2014	The Idolmaster One For All	Ranko Kanzaki
2015	Final Fantasy XIV: Heavensward	Iceheart/Saint Shiva
2015	Megadimension Neptunia VII	S-Sha/E-Sha
2015	The Idolmaster Cinderella Girls: Starlight Stage	Ranko Kanzaki
2015	Shironeko Project	Charlotte
2015	Noragami ~Gods and Fate~	Iki Hiyori
2015	Battle Girl High School	Urara Hasumi
2015	Luminous Arc Infinity	Brigitta Earl Age
2015	Date A Live Twin Edition: Rio Reincarnation	Kaguya Yamai
2015	Stella Glow	Popo
2015	MÚSECA	ILLIL
2016	Valkyrie Connect	Envy Scion Esquire, Elf Queen Quarys
2016	Shironeko Tennis	Charlotte
2016	Is the Order a Rabbit?? Wonderful Party!	Sharo Kirima
2016	Lilycle Rainbow Stage!!!	Mai Shiina
2016	Ragnastrike Angels	Izuki Kanomiya
2016	Special Force 2 (MMOFPS Online)	Sophia K/Gothloli (Japanese & Taiwan server only)
2016	Girls' Frontline	CZ-805
2017	Magia Record	Tsukuyo Amane
2017	Fire Emblem Heroes	Sharena
2017	Fire Emblem Warriors	Lianna
2017	Another Eden	Deirdre, Laclair
2017	Magia Record	Tsukuyo Amane
2017	Grisaia Phantom Trigger	Rena Fukami
2017	Project Tokyo Dolls	Yuki
2017	Dragon Quest XI	Veronica, Puff-Puff Girl
2017	Is It Wrong to Try to Pick Up Girls in a Dungeon? Memoria Freese	Liliruca Arde, Kaguya Yamai, Fianna
2017	SINoALICE	Gretel
2018	Grand Chase: Dimensional Chaser	Lire Eryuell
2018	Dead or Alive Xtreme Venus Vacation	Nagisa
2018	Princess Connect! Re:Dive	Maho Himemiya
2018	New Gundam Breaker	Aida Sie
2018	Dragon Quest Rivals	Veronica
2018	Alice Gear Aegis	Sitara Kaneshiya
2019	Shiro Project:RE	"Kimodameshi" Matsue Castle
2019	SaGa: Scarlet Grace – Ambitions	Urpina
2019	Langrisser:Mobile	Almeda
2019	Mahjong Soul	Ichihime
2019	Monster Strike	Solomon
2019	Magatsu Wahrheit	Percy
2019	New Sakura Wars	Hatsuho Shinonome
2019	13 Sentinels: Aegis Rim	Megumi Yakushiji
2019	Azur Lane	Hibiki
2020	Genshin Impact	Fischl
2020	Arknights	Mudrock
2020	Fortune Lover Trial Version	Catarina Claes
2020	Seiken Densetsu 3: Trials of Mana	Fairy
2020	Pokémon Masters EX	Lillie, Matiere
2020	Fate/Grand Order	Pollux
2020	Shadowverse Champions Battle	Kagura Kirisame
2020	Dragalia Lost	Sharena, Annelie
2020	Date A Live: Spirit Pledge	Kaguya Yamai
2020	AFK Arena	Solise
2021	Gal Gun Returns	Kaoruko Sakurazaki
2021	Kuro no Kiseki	Shizuna Rem Misurugi
2021	Identity V	Norman
2021	The Rising of the Shield Hero RERISE	Melty
2021	Alchemy Stars	Leah, Joanie Boom, Gronru
2021	Cookie Run: Kingdom	Pure Vanilla Cookie
2021	The Idolmaster: Starlit Season	Ranko Kanzaki
2021	Domestic Girlfriend	Rui Tachibana
2021	Overlord Mass For The Dead	Melty, Kaguya Yamai
2021	Hunter x Hunter Arena Battle	Alluka
2021	Ni no Kuni: Cross Worlds	Rogue
2021	The Idolmaster: Pop Links	Ranko Kanzaki
2021	Tales of Luminaria	Lydie Delacroix
2022	My Next Life as a Villainess: All Routes Lead to Doom! The Pirate Known as "Trouble"	Catarina Claes
2022	Princess Connect! Grand Masters	Maho
2022	Super Robot Wars DD	Marrybell mel Britannia
2022	PUBG Mobile	Blood-dyed Little Red Riding Hood
2022	MapleStory	Captain (Female), Flame Wizard (Female), Wind Shooter (Female), Oz, Irina
2022	Ikki Tousen: Extra Burst	Vermeil
2022	The Legend of Heroes: Trails Through Daybreak II	Shizuna Rem Misurugi
2022	Valkyrie Elysium	Kristoffer
2022	Alice Gear Aegis CS	Sitara Kaneshiya
2022	The King of Fighters All Star	Pretty Chin Gentsai
2022	Shironeko Golf	Charlotte
2022	Goddess of Victory: Nikke	Epinel, Admi
2022	The Eminence in Shadow: Master of Garden	Nu
2023	Tower of Saviors	Nulla
2023	Helios Rising Heroes	Licht
2023	FITNESS CIRCUIT	JJ
2023	Riichi City	Shiraha Asuka
2023	Tower of Fantasy	Lan
2023	Dislyte	Berenice, Asenath
2023	Code Geass: Lelouch of the Rebellion Lost Stories	Marrybell mel Britannia
2023	Is It Wrong to Try to Pick Up Girls in a Dungeon? Battle Chronicle	Liliruca Arde
2023	The Rising of the Shield Hero: Waves of Calamity	Melty
2023	Neptunia GameMaker R:Evolution	Ethusia
2023	Cubic Stars	Solomon
2023	Azur Lane	Princess Hime
2023	Racing Master	Gloria
2024	Eiyuden Chronicle: Hundred Heroes	Perrielle Grum
2024	Touhou Spell Carnival	Remilia Scarlet
2024	Wizardry Variants Daphne	Lanavaille
2026	Dark Auction	Karla Becker
2026	Neverness to Everness	Esper Zero
2026	Nekopara: Sekai Connect	Yuzuha

=== Drama CDs ===
Year	Title	Role
2012	Sankarea	Rea Sanka
2012	Waratte! Sotomura-san	Mika Haruno
2013	Fushigisou+Jūnin×Jūnin	NANAMI
2013	Pochapocha Swimming Club	Rinko Kaji
2013	Lily Cool -LIly LYric cyCLE-	Mai Shiina
2014	Seiken Tsukai no World Break	Haruka Momochi
2014	Lily Cool -LIly LYric cyCLE-	Mai Shiina
2014	Gonna be the Twin-Tail!!	Twoerle
2014	Rail Wars!	Haruka Koumi
2015	Idolmaster "What would you like to do?"	Ranko Kanzaki
2015	Chaos Dragon	Lou Zhenhua
2015	Odoru Hoshifuru Renesickle	Mizuki Sara
2015	Kai-ri-Sei Million Arthur	Utahime Arthur
2015	Today's Cerberus	Rose
2015	Tsubu Doll	Minami
2015	Phantasy Star Nova	Lutina
2015	KonoSuba	Megumin
2015	Charlotte	Yusa Nishimori, Misa Kurobane
2015	Hantsu x Trash	Hagiwara
2016	Noragami Aragoto	Hiyori Iki
2016	My Sweet Tyrant	Chiho Kagari
2016	Lilycle Rainbow Stage	Mai Shiina
2017	Goblin Slayer	Guild Girl
2018	Is It Wrong to Try to Pick Up Girls in a Dungeon?	Liliruca Arde
2018	Takunomi	Makoto Kiriyama
2019	The Promised Neverland	Norman
2019	In Another World With My Smartphone	Elze Silhoueska
2019	Princess Connect! Re: Dive PRICONNE CHARACTER SONG	Maho
2019	Kabaneri of the Iron Fortress: Denshin Houkoku Suzuki Tanzaemon Satsujinjiken	Ayame
2019	YU-NO: A Girl Who Chants Love at the Bound of this World	Kanna Hatano
2020	My Next Life as a Villainess: All Routes Lead to Doom!	Catarina Claes
2021	The Promised Neverland 2nd Season	Norman
2021	My Next Life as a Villainess: All Routes Lead to Doom! X	Catarina Claes
2021	Saionji Koshodo Kaikitan -San no Hen-	Himejo Saya
2022	Alice Gear Aegis ~Mizugi ni Matsuwaru Etosetora~	Sitara Kaneshiya
2023	Tearmoon Empire Drama CD 2	Miabel Luna Tearmoon
2023	Sweet Reincarnation Drama CD 2	Ruminiito Aidilichpa

=== Dubbing roles ===
Live-action movie

Year	Title	Role	Original Performer	Source
2016	Grandma	Sage	Julia Garner	
2016	Roboshark	Melody	Vanessa Grasse	
2019	The Hurricane Heist	Casey Corbyn	Maggie Grace	
2021	Shang-Chi and the Legend of the Ten Rings	Xialing	Meng'er Zhang	
2021	Dune	Chani	Zendaya	
2021	The Matrix Resurrections	Bugs	Jessica Henwick	
2022	Scream	Sam Carpenter	Melissa Barrera	
2022	Top Gun: Maverick	Natasha "Phoenix" Trace	Monica Barbaro	
2022	The Gray Man	Suzanne Brewer	Jessica Henwick	
2022	Black Adam	Maxine Hunkel / Cyclone	Quintessa Swindell	
2022	Avatar: The Way of Water	Tsireya	Bailey Bass	
2023	Three Wishes for Cinderella	Cinderella	Astrid S	
2023	Mad Heidi	Heidi	Alice Lucy	
2023	Shades of the Heart	Mi-young	Lee Ji-eun	
2023	Scream VI	Sam Carpenter	Melissa Barrera	
2023	RRR	Jennifer "Jenny"	Olivia Morris	
2023	John Wick: Chapter 4	Shimazu Akira	Rina Sawayama	
2024	Dune: Part Two	Chani	Zendaya	
2024	Godzilla x Kong: The New Empire	Laurier	Sophia Emberson-Bain	
2024	Alien: Romulus	Kay	Isabela Merced	
2025	Mickey 17	Kai Katz	Anamaria Vartolomei	
2025	F1	Jodie	Callie Cooke	
2025	Tron: Ares	Eve Kim	Greta Lee	
2025	Avatar: Fire and Ash	Tsireya	Bailey Bass	

Live-action drama

Year	Title	Role	Original Performer	Source
2013	Big	Jang Mari	Bae Suzy	
2013	Nail Salon Paris	Hong Yeo Joo	Park Gyu-ri	
2020	Find Me in Paris	Lena Grisky	Jessica Lord	
2020	#AnneFrank: Parallel Stories	Katerina	Martina Gatti	
2021	A Discovery of Witches	Diana Bishop	Teresa Palmer	
2022	Halo	Kwan Ha Boo	Yerin Ha	
2022	The Terminal List	Katie Buranek	Constance Wu	
2022	The Gilded Age	Marian Brook	Louisa Jacobson	
2022	Killing Eve	Pam	Anjana Vasan	

Animation

Year	Title	Role	Source
2018	Unikitty!	Princess Unikitty	
2020-2022	Jurassic World Camp Cretaceous	Brooklynn	
2024	Jurassic World: Chaos Theory	Brooklynn	
2021	Playmobil: The Movie	Fairy Godmother	
2021	New Gods: Nezha Reborn	Kasha	
2022	Tara Duncan	Tara Duncan	

=== Commercials ===
- Unofficial Sentai Akibaranger「MMZ-01 Moe Moe Zukyun」 (2012)
- Chain Chronicle (2014)
- Millennium War Aigis (2015), Anna
- Meiji「SABAS Milk Grapefruit Flavor」(2015)
- Mitsubishi Jisho Residence (2017)
- Marui no Anime「Neko ga Kureta Maarui no Shiawase」 (2017)
- KADOKAWA「Ikinokori Renkinjutsushi wa Machi de Shizuka ni Kurashitai」#1 (2017)
- Pelack T Tablets (2018)
- Dydo BLEND COFFEE (2018), Kouko Sukita
- Parapara Manga「Midjikana Mono Ni AGC／o Furo Hen」Female ver. (2018)
- SoftBank Giga Kuni Monogatari (2019), Satowa (voice)
- Mon Petit Natural Gourmand Campaign (2019), Cat
- Paiza Learning (2019), Mikage Suzutsuki
- Baby Star Ramen Otsumami (2019)
- Harry Potter: Wizards Unite (2019), Girl Protagonist (Japanese voice)
- HABA Hitoshizu-kun (2020)
- Audio Technica ATH-ANC300TW(Wireless Earphones) (2020)
- Ichijinsha「My Next Life as a Villainess: All Routes Lead to Doom!」 (2020)
- 【Piccoma】Hotto, Hitokoma (2020)
- Baby Star Ramen Otsumami (2020)
- Witch and the Beast (2020)
- Pocari Sweat (2021)
- Weekly Shounen Magazine「Tensei Shitara dai Nana Ouji dattanode, Kimamani Majutsu o Kiwamemasu」 (2021)
- Disney Christmas Movie「the WONDERFUL PRESENT!」 (2021)
- Baby Star Lullaby (2022)
- Choi Hapi Seven Sweets (2022), Aya
- Adachi Mitsuru no Shuutaisei「MIX」 (2022)
- Toyo Suisan「Urusei Yatsura x Maru-chan Red Fox and Green Tanuki」Collaboration Movie (2022), Miyake Shinobu
- 「15 Minutes 'Til They Actually Start Dating」 MV (2023), Natsuha

=== TV programs and internet shows ===
Year	Title	Role	Network	Note
2011	FamitsuTV 3rd Season	Assistant Host	Niconico	
2012–2014	School of God	Personality	Sendai TV	
2013–2014	Hecatoncheire no Sentaku	Assistant Host	AT-X	
2014–2021	Sakura to Uchida no GanGanGA Channel	Host (with Ayane Sakura)	Niconico and YouTube	
2017–2018	Uchida Maaya with you smile	Host	FRESH	
2017–2020	Mouse Computer no aru Seikatsu	Host	YouTube	
2018–2020	MobiFabo	Host (with Kentaro Ito)	TBS	
2019–2023	Say You to Yo Asobi	Host (with Hiro Shimono)	AbemaTV	
2020	Azatokute Nani ga Warui no?	Guest	TV Asahi	One episode
2021–present	MobiKyun	Host (with Daichi Kaneko)	TBS	
2023	Ariyoshi Assists	Host	Netflix	One episode

==== Narration ====
Year	Title	Network	Note	Source
2015–present	MusicRu TV	TV Asahi		
2017	Mōretsu Research! Gyōten Maruchin Ranking	TV Tokyo	One episode	
2018	R-1 Grand Prix 2018 Winner Special Program	Kansai TV		
2019	IPPON Grand Prix	Fuji TV	One episode	
2019–present	Achikochi Audrey 〜Kasuga no mise aitemasu yo?〜	TV Tokyo		
2020–2021	Ninosan	Nippon TV	Eight episodes	
2020–present	Junichi Davidson no Hetana Kyanpude Gomennasai	GAORA		
2021	Fukuoka SoftBank Hawks 2020 Season Review DVD	DVD		
2021	Oshietemorau Mae to Ato	MBS TV		
2021	Kamaigachi	TV Asahi	One episode	
2021	Sekai Marumie! TV Tokusō-bu	Nippon TV	One episode	
2021–present	Kodomo Neta Clinic	NHK E-Tele		
2021–present	KAT-TUN's Food Treasure Gettoon	TBS		
2022	Fukuoka SoftBank Hawks 2021 Season Review DVD	DVD		
2022	Masahiro Nakai no Pro Yakyuu Tamashii	TV Asahi	One episode	
2022–2023	Ii Hanashi ee	TV Tokyo		
2023	Fukuoka SoftBank Hawks 2022 Season Review DVD	DVD		

=== Films ===
Year	Title	Role
2020	Wotakoi: Love Is Hard for Otaku	Herself
2021	Saber + Zenkaiger: Super Hero Senki	Akibaranger Sentai Gear (voice)

=== Television drama ===
Year	Title	Role
2012	Unofficial Sentai Akibaranger	Hiroyo Hakase
2013	Unofficial Sentai Akibaranger: Season Two	Hiroyo Hakase
2013	Meshibana Deka Tachibana	Saya Takeuchi
2014	Unidentified Fantastic Idol	Kakokarin (voice)
2019	Neko Sentai Bitatama	Bitatama Pink, Emi (voice)
2020	Keishichou Sousa Ichikachou 2020	Rika Oita
2020	The Way of the Househusband	Neopolis Girl (voice)
2021	Boku no Satsui ga Koi wo Shita	Hedgehog Detective Harry (voice)

=== Web drama ===
Year	Title	Role
2018	Koe Dake Tenshi	Guest (Ep. 10)

=== Stage ===
Year	Title	Role
2012	Pochitto na -Switching On Summer-	Asuka Enzan
2018	My Tomorrow, Your Yesterday	Emi Fukujo
2018	Love Letters 2018 Autumn Special	Melissa Gardner
2019	Itsumo Pocket ni Chopin	Asako Sue
2019	We Married as a Job	Mikuri Moriyama
2019	Aozora	
2019	My Tomorrow, Your Yesterday	Emi Fukujo
2020	5 Centimeters per Second	Akari Shinohara
2021	We Married as a Job	Mikuri Moriyama
2023	Hajimete no	

== Discography ==
=== Singles ===
#	Single details	Catalog no.		Oricon		Album
#	Single details	Limited	Regular	Peak position	Weeks charted	Album
1st	Soushou Innocence (創傷イノセンス): Released: April 23, 2014	PCCG-01396	PCCG-70207	14	9	PENKI
2nd	Gimme! Revolution (ギミー!レボリューション): Released: October 22, 2014	PCCG-01432	PCCG-70230	12	12	PENKI
3rd	Karappo Capsule (からっぽカプセル): Released: April 1, 2015	PCCG-01469	PCCG-70249	14	4	PENKI
4th	Resonant Heart: Released: May 11, 2016	PCCG-01515	PCCG-70314	13	4	Magic Hour
5th	+INTERSECT+: Released: June 21, 2017	PCCG-01617	PCCG-70399	8	4	Magic Hour
6th	c.o.s.m.o.s: Released: October 25, 2017	PCCG-01625	PCCG-70400	6	4	Magic Hour
7th	aventure bleu: Released: February 14, 2018	PCCG-01639	PCCG-70413	14	4	Magic Hour
8th	youthful beautiful: Released: October 17, 2018	PCCG-01725	PCCG-70435	7	14	HIKARI
9th	Kodou Escalation (鼓動エスカレーション): Released: July 10, 2019	PCCG-01789	PCCG-70456	10	3	HIKARI
10th	No Scenario (ノーシナリオ): Released: March 18, 2020	PCCG-01890	PCCG-70472	12	6	HIKARI
11th	Heartbeat City/Itsuka Kumo ga Haretanara (ハートビートシティ／いつか雲が晴れたなら): Released: November 25, 2020	PCCG-01943	PCCG-70474	14	4	HIKARI
12th	Strobe Memory (ストロボメモリー): Released: May 12, 2021	PCCG-01992	PCCG-01993	10	8	HIKARI
13th	Kikoeru? (聴こえる？): Released: April 20, 2022	PCCG-02133	PCCG-70495	12	5	TOKYO-BYAKUYA
14th	Loud Hailer (ラウドへイラー): Released: January 25, 2023	PCCG-02214	PCCG-02215	14	4	TOKYO-BYAKUYA
15th	Love You Tender! (ラブ・ユー・テンダー!): Released: October 18, 2023	PCCG-02291	PCCG-02292	12	4	TOKYO-BYAKUYA
16th	CHA∞IN: Released: January 17, 2024	PCCG-02319	PCCG-02320	12	5	TOKYO-BYAKUYA

Digital singles

#	Single details	Catalog no.
1st	CHASER GAME: Released: September 16, 2022	PCSP-04469

=== Albums ===
#	Album details	Catalog no.				Oricon	
#	Album details	Canime-Limited	BD-Limited	DVD-Limited	Regular	Peak position	Weeks charted
1st	Penki: Released: December 2, 2015	—	PCCG-01492	PCCG-01493	PCCG-01494	6	7
2nd	Magic Hour: Released: April 25, 2018	—	PCCG-01668	PCCG-01669	PCCG-01670	7	6
3rd	Hikari: Released: October 27, 2021	SCCG-00084	PCCG-02064	—	PCCG-02065	12	3
4th	Tokyo-Byakuya: Released: May 29, 2024		BRCG-00099 (2BD); PCCG-02358 (1BD)	—	PCCG-02359	10	3

=== Mini albums ===
#	Mini album details	Catalog no.			Oricon	
#	Mini album details	BD-Limited	DVD-Limited	Regular	Peak position	Weeks charted
1st	Drive-in Theater: Released: January 11, 2017	PCCG-01566	PCCG-01567	PCCG-01568	6	5
2nd	you are here: Released: October 2, 2019	PCCG-01812	PCCG-01813	PCCG-01814	9	4

=== As a featured artist ===
Release date	Product name	Singers	Song	Note
May 13, 2015	Hajimare, THE GATE!!	Various Artists	Hajimare, THE GATE!!	Animelo Summer Live 2015 -THE GATE- Theme Song
July 12, 2017	Odore! Kyuukyoku Tetsugaku	Uesaka Sumire featuring Uchida Maaya	Saisentan△Girl	
October 25, 2017	Tsubasa wo Motsumono ~Not an angel Just a dreamer~	Various Artists	Tsubasa wo Motsumono ~Not an angel Just a dreamer~	Anime NEXT_100 Project Official Song
May 16, 2018	Stand by...MUSIC!!!	Various Artists	Stand by...MUSIC!!!	Animelo Summer Live 2018 "OK!" Theme Song
July 13, 2022	Dance In The Game	ZAQ featuring Uchida Maaya	Raibu wo Wasureta Otaku ni Sasageru Oratorio	

=== Tie-up songs ===
	Song	Tie-up	Year
1st single	Soushou Innocence	TV Animation「Riddle Story of Devil」Opening Theme	2014
2nd single	Gimme! Revolution	TV Animation「Gonna be the Twin-Tail!!」Opening Theme	2014
3rd single	Karappo Capsule	WEB Animation「Comical Psychosomatic Medicine」Ending Theme	2015
4th single	Resonant Heart	TV Animation「Seisen Cerberus: Ryuukoku no Fatalités」Opening Theme	2016
7th single	aventure bleu	TV Animation「Takunomi」Opening Theme	2018
8th single	youthful beautiful	TV & Movie Animation「SSSS.Gridman」Ending Theme	2018
9th single	Kodou Escalation	TV Animation「Ace of Diamond Act II」Ending Theme	2019
12th single	Strobe Memory	TV & Movie Animation「SSSS.Dynazenon」Ending Theme	2021
13th single	Kikoeru?	TV Animation「Miss Shachiku and the Little Baby Ghost」Ending Theme	2022
Digital single	CHASER GAME	TV Drama「Chaser Game」Opening Theme	2022
14th single	Loud Hailer	TV Animation「The Iceblade Sorcerer Shall Rule the World」Ending Theme	2023
11th single	Heartbeat City	Movie Animation「Gridman Universe」Insert Song	2023
15th single	Love You Tender!	TV Animation「You Were Experienced, I Was Not: Our Dating Story」Opening Theme	2023
16th single	CHA∞IN	TV Animation「Chained Soldier」Ending Theme	2024

== Concerts ==
=== Personal concerts ===
Date	Title	Venue	Source
February 28, 2016	UCHIDA MAAYA 1st LIVE "Hello, 1st contact!"	Nakano Sun Plaza	
February 25–26, 2017	UCHIDA MAAYA 2nd LIVE "Smiling Spiral"	Yoyogi National Gymnasium	
July 1 and 29, 2017	UCHIDA MAAYA 2017 "+INTERSECT SUMMER+"	2 venues: Hibiya Open-Air Concert Hall; NHK Osaka Hall	
June 17 and 24, 2018; July 1, 2018	UCHIDA MAAYA "Magic Number" TOUR 2018	3 venues: Fukuoka Sunpalace; Tokyo International Forum Hall A; Grand Cube Osaka	
January 1, 2019	UCHIDA MAAYA New Year LIVE 2019 "take you take me BUDOKAN!!"	Nippon Budokan	
November 9, 10 and 24, 2019; December 8, 14 and 16, 2019	UCHIDA MAAYA Zepp Tour 2019 "we are here"	5 venues: Zepp Nagoya; Zepp Osaka Bayside; Zepp Fukuoka; Zepp Tokyo; Zepp Sapporo	
July 5, 2020	UCHIDA MAAYA LIVE 2020 "Live For All Stars" (canceled)	Yokohama Arena	
July 5, 2020	"Hello, ONLINE contact!" (online)	Harevutai	
July 3, 2021	UCHIDA MAAYA LIVE 2021 "FLASH FLASH FLASH"	Tachikawa Stage Garden	
February 20, 2022; March 13, 2022	UCHIDA MAAYA LIVE 2022 "MA-YA-YAN Happy Cream MAX!!"	2 venues: Pacifico Yokohama; Grand Cube Osaka	
September 24, 2022	UCHIDA MAAYA "Hello, 1st contact! [Revival]"	Culttz Kawasaki	
September 3, 10, 16, 23 and 24, 2023; October 1 and 15, 2023	UCHIDA MAAYA Live Tour 2023 "Happy Research! -HIKARI-"	7 venues: Zepp DiverCity; Zepp Sapporo; SENDAI GIGS; Zepp Nagoya; Zepp Osaka Bayside; Zepp Fukuoka; KT Zepp Yokohama	

=== Party and events ===
Date	Title	Venue	Source
December 27, 2014	Maaya Happy Birthday Party!!	Yamano Hall	
December 25, 2016	Maaya Happy Birthday & Xmas Party!! 2016	Sagami Women's University Green Hall	
December 27, 2017	Maaya Happy Birthday & Xmas Party!! 2017	Culttz Kawasaki	
October 28, 2018	UCHIDA MAAYA Fan Club Event "LIVE IS LIKE A SUNNY DAY♫" Vol.1	Tsutaya O-East	
April 27–28, 2019	UCHIDA MAAYA Fan Club Event "LIVE IS LIKE A SUNNY DAY♫" Vol. 2	Nakano Sun Plaza; IMP Hall	
December 28, 2019	Maaya Happy Birthday Party!! 2019	Shinjuku Bunka Centre	
April 18 and 26, 2020	UCHIDA MAAYA Fan Club Event "LIVE IS LIKE A SUNNY DAY♫" Vol. 3 (canceled)	Sonic City Hall; Zepp Namba	
December 27, 2020	Maaya Heart Beat Party!!	Matsudo City Cultural Hall	
May 3, 2021	UCHIDA MAAYA Fan Club Event "LIVE IS LIKE A SUNNY DAY♫" Vol.3 (canceled)	Shinjuku Bunka Centre	
December 5, 2021	UCHIDA MAAYA Fan Club Event "LIVE IS LIKE A SUNNY DAY♫" Vol. 3	Shinjuku Bunka Centre	
April 23, 2022	UCHIDA MAAYA Fan Club Event "LIVE IS LIKE A SUNNY DAY♫" Vol. 4	J:COM Hall Hachioji	
December 25, 2022	Maaya XmasParty!! 2022	Kawaguchi Lilia Hall	
April 30, 2023	UCHIDA MAAYA Fan Club Event "LIVE IS LIKE A SUNNY DAY♫" Vol. 5	Nakano ZERO Hall	
December 24, 2023	Maaya XmasParty!! 2023	Pacifico Yokohama	

=== Other concerts ===
Date	Title	Venue	Source
June 1, 2014	@JAM2014	Zepp DiverCity Tokyo	
June 21, 2014	P's Live! 01	Gotanda U-Port Hall	
November 22, 2014	ANIMAX MUSIX 2014 YOKOHAMA	Yokohama Arena	
March 28, 2015	P's Live! 02 ～LOVE&P's～	Yokohama Arena	
August 30, 2015	Animelo Summer Live 2015 -THE GATE-	Saitama Super Arena	
November 21, 2015	ANIMAX MUSIX 2015 YOKOHAMA	Yokohama Arena	
November 28, 2015	P's LIVE! AFA(03)	Suntec Singapore Convention and Exhibition Centre	
January 24, 2016	LisAni! LIVE 2016 [SUNDAY STAGE]	Nippon Budokan	
March 26, 2016	AJ Night 2016	Differ Ariake	
August 27, 2016	Animelo Summer Live 2016 刻-TOKI-	Saitama Super Arena	
October 9, 2016	P's LIVE TORANOMON SP 〜50th Anniversary〜	Nissho Hall	
November 23, 2016	ANIMAX MUSIX 2016 YOKOHAMA	Yokohama Arena	
August 19, 2017	SUMMER STATION Music LIVE	Roppongi Hills Arena	
August 27, 2017	Animelo Summer Live 2017 -THE CARD-	Saitama Super Arena	
November 26, 2017	P's LIVE! 05 Go! Love&Passion!!	Yokohama Arena	
January 28, 2018	LisAni! LIVE 2018 [SUNDAY STAGE]	Nippon Budokan	
March 3, 2018	ANIMAX MUSIX 2018 OSAKA	Osaka-Jo Hall	
April 14, 2018	musicRu FES 2018 – Spring Edition –	Akasaka Blitz	
May 13, 2018	ANiUTa Live 2018 -Aniupa!!-	Makuhari Messe	
August 25, 2018	Animelo Summer Live 2018 "OK!"	Saitama Super Arena	
October 12, 2018	NHK WORLD-JAPAN presents SONGS OF TOKYO	NHK Hall	
March 22, 2019	AJ Night 2019	Zepp DiverCity Tokyo	
September 1, 2019	Animelo Summer Live 2019 -STORY-	Saitama Super Arena	
October 19, 2019	LisAni! LIVE TAIWAN 2019 [SATURDAY STAGE]	Taipei International Convention Center	
November 29, 2019	AFA Singapore 2019	Suntec Singapore Convention and Exhibition Centre	
July 5, 2020	Anime Expo Lite x LisAni! LIVE L.A. (online)	Online	
October 18, 2020	EJ ANIME MUSIC FESTIVAL 2020 (online)	Tokorozawa Sakura Town Japan Pavilion Hall A	
February 27, 2021	LisAni! LIVE 2021	Nippon Budokan	
June 20, 2021	EJ My Girl Festival 2021	Maihama Amphitheater	
August 29, 2021	Animelo Summer Live 2021 "Colors"	Saitama Super Arena	
July 17, 2022	BILIBILI MACRO LINK - STAR PHASE 2022	Makuhari Messe	
August 28, 2022	Animelo Summer Live 2022 "Sparkle"	Saitama Super Arena	
January 29, 2023	LisAni! LIVE 2023	Nippon Budokan	
February 12, 2023	Odaiba!! Hyper Dimensional Music Festival Valentine Festival 2023	Pia Arena MM	
August 27, 2023	Animelo Summer Live 2023 "AXEL"	Saitama Super Arena	
November 18, 2023	ANIMAX MUSIX 2023	Yokohama Arena	
September 28 and 29, 2024	YUMA UCHIDA LIVE “VS YUMA 001- Uchida Maaya”	Pacifico Yokohama	

=== Personal concert video releases ===
#	Details	Catalog no.	
#	Details	BD	DVD
1	UCHIDA MAAYA 1st LIVE「Hello, 1st contact!」: Released: July 20, 2016	PCXP-50400	PCBP-52418
2	UCHIDA MAAYA 2nd LIVE「Smiling Spiral」: Released: September 23, 2017	PCXP-50505	PCBP-53535
3	UCHIDA MAAYA LIVE 2017「+INTERSECT SUMMER+」: Released: November 29, 2017	PCXP-50530	PCBP-53536
4	UCHIDA MAAYA「Magic Number」TOUR 2018: Released: December 12, 2018	PCXP-50609	PCBP-53772
5	UCHIDA MAAYA New Year LIVE 2019「take you take me BUDOKAN!!」: Released: May 22, 2019	PCXP-50649	PCBP-53928
6	UCHIDA MAAYA Zepp Tour 2019「we are here」: Released: April 22, 2020	PCXP-50752	PCBP-54079
7	UCHIDA MAAYA LIVE 2021「FLASH FLASH FLASH」: Released: December 15, 2021	PCXP-50869	PCBP-54452
8	UCHIDA MAAYA LIVE 2022「MA-YA-YAN Happy Cream MAX!!」: Released: July 27, 2022	PCXP-50892	—
9	UCHIDA MAAYA LIVE 2022「Hello, 1st contact! [Revival]」: Released: March 15, 2023	PCXP-50945	—

== Radio programs ==
=== Personal radio programs ===
- Won't You Talk With Uchida Maaya? (内田真礼とおはなししません？) (2015–present)
- M×M×S 内田真礼の「真礼充ラジオ」(2013–present)

=== Other radio programs ===
- Sankarea Radio Hajimemashita (さんかれあラジオはじめました) (2012)
- Ayamaya!? (あやまあ屋!?) with Aya Suzaki (2013)
- Aoharadio (アオハラジオ) with Yuki Kaji (2014)
- Million Arthur Radio! MiriRaji! (ミリオンアーサーRADIO!ミリラジ) with Arisa Suzuki (2015–2020)
- I Reincarnated into an Otome Game as a Radio Personality With Only Destruction Flags...(女ゲームの破滅フラグしかないラジオパーソナリティーに転生してしまった...) (2020–2021)

== Publications ==
=== Photobooks ===
- [2014.12.24] Maaya (まあや)
- [2019.03.25] étoile
- [2023.02.08] Maaya Doki (まあやドキ)

=== Video ===
- [2012.08.27] Akihabara Seiyuu Matsuri: THE MOVIE (秋葉原声優まつり THE MOVIE)
- [2013.02.22] Ura Ai Mai Mi (裏あいまいみー)
- [2013.04.17] Kane-Tomo Seiyuu Lab Vol. 1 (金朋声優ラボ Vol.1)
- [2013.10.21] Takamori Natsumi to Uchida Maaya no Seiyuu Shokugyou Taiken-sho (高森奈津美と内田真礼の声優職業体験所)
- [2013.12.24] Riddle Heart I ~Pension Stone Mountain Satsujin Shiken~ (リドルハートI〜ペンション・ストーンマウンテン殺人事件〜)
- [2014.12.24] Maaya, Okinawa ni Ittekimashita! (まあや、沖縄に行ってきましたっ!)
- [2017.09.24] Uchida Maaya to Ohanashi Shimasen? ～ in Taiwan (内田真礼とおはなししません？～in 台湾)
- [2019.03.25] Maaya, France ni Ittekimashita!! (まあや、フランスに行ってきましたっ!!)
- [2022.03.01] Uchida Maaya to Kyanpu Shimasen? (内田真礼とキャンプしません？)
