= Hikari (Maaya Uchida album) =

HIKARI

Studio album by Maaya Uchida
- Released: October 27, 2021
- Genre: J-pop
- Length: 1:05:51
- Label: Pony Canyon
- Producer: Akihiro Tomita

Maaya Uchida chronology
| you are here (2019) | HIKARI (2021) |

Singles from HIKARI
- 1. "Youthful Beautiful" Released: October 17, 2018; 2. "Kodou Escalation" Released: July 10, 2019; 3. "No Scenario" Released: March 18, 2020; 4. "Heartbeat City/Itsuka Kumo ga Haretanara" Released: November 25, 2020; 5. "Strobe Memory" Released: May 12, 2021

Hikari (stylized in all uppercase) is the third studio album of Japanese voice actress and singer Maaya Uchida, released on October 27, 2021.

== Track listings ==
CD
| No. | Title | Lyrics | Music | Arrangement | Length |
|---|---|---|---|---|---|
| 1. | "Change the world" | Q-MHz | Q-MHz | Q-MHz, y0c1e | 2:43 |
| 2. | "Never ending symphony" | R・O・N | R・O・N | R・O・N | 3:47 |
| 3. | "No Scenario" (ノーシナリオ) | Shou Watanabe | Shou Watanabe | Yusuke Shirato | 4:30 |
| 4. | "youthful beautiful" | RIRIKO | RIRIKO | Yusuke Shirato, RIRIKO | 4:37 |
| 5. | "LIFE LIVE ALIVE" | Asuka Oda (Elements Garden) | Ryutaro Fujinaga (Elements Garden) | Ryutaro Fujinaga (Elements Garden) | 5:23 |
| 6. | "Kodou Escalation" (鼓動エスカレーション) | hotaru | Tom-H@ck | KanadeYUK, Tom-H@ck | 3:52 |
| 7. | "Flash Idea" (フラッシュアイデア) | Junya Maesako, Risa | Junya Maesako, after all | after all | 4:09 |
| 8. | "Heartbeat City" (ハートビートシティ) | Taku Inoue | Taku Inoue | kz(livetune) | 4:17 |
| 9. | "Astra" (アストラ) | Δ | Δ | Δ, y0c1e | 3:41 |
| 10. | "Strobe Memory" (ストロボメモリー) | RIRIKO | RIRIKO | RIRIKO | 4:44 |
| 11. | "Love for All Stars" | ZAQ | ZAQ | Yusuke Shirato | 5:11 |
| 12. | "Itsuka Kumo ga Haretanara" (いつか雲が晴れたなら) | kz(livetune) | kz(livetune) | TAKU INOUE | 4:49 |
| 13. | "Flag Ship" | PA-NON | fu_mou | fu_mou | 4:42 |
| 14. | "YA-YA-YAN Happy Climax!" | Q-MHz | Q-MHz | Q-MHz, Yashikin | 3:45 |
| 15. | "Excite the world!" | Q-MHz | Q-MHz | Q-MHz, Hikaru Sakurazawa | 5:41 |
| Total length: | | | | | 65:51 |

BD・DVD
| No. | Title | Length |
|---|---|---|
| 1. | "Never ending symphony" (MUSIC VIDEO) |
| 2. | "Never ending symphony" (OFF SHOT) |
| 3. | "Never ending symphony" (MAKING) |
| 4. | "LIFE LIFE ALIVE" (MUSIC VIDEO) |
| 5. | "LIFE LIVE ALIVE" (OFF SHOT) |
| 6. | "LIVE LIVE ALIVE" (MAKING) |
| 7. | "youthful beautiful" (MUSIC VIDEO) |
| 8. | "Kodou Escalation" (MUSIC VIDEO) |
| 9. | "No Scenario" (MUSIC VIDEO) |
| 10. | "Heartbeat City/Itsuka Kumo ga Haretanara" (MUSIC VIDEO) |
| 11. | "Strobe Memory" (MUSIC VIDEO) |

Hello, ONLINE contact! Live Video

== Charts ==
| Chart (2021) | Peak position |
|---|---|
| Oricon Weekly Albums Chart | 12 |
| Billboard JAPAN Hot Albums | 10 |
| Billboard JAPAN Top Albums Sales | 12 |

== Event ==
- 『 Maaya Party！13 』 Maaya Uchida 3rd Album Release Event「Maaya Party！13」（December 11, 2021 - December 18, 2021：Online）
