= The Relative Worlds =

Japanese original net animation series

ソウタイセカイ (Sōtai Sekai)
- Original net animation
- Directed by: Yūhei Sakuragi
- Written by: Yūhei Sakuragi
- Music by: Hidehiro Kawai
- Studio: Craftar
- Released: April 28, 2017; May 5, 2017
- Anime film
- Directed by: Yūhei Sakuragi; Hiroki Matsūra (Note: Matsūra and Takae credited as Animation Director (アニメーションディレクター), which is a separate credit from the "sakuga" animation director (作画監督)); Tomoyuki Takae
- Produced by: Tomohiko Ishii
- Written by: Yūhei Sakuragi
- Music by: Hidehiro Kawai
- Studio: Craftar
- Released: January 25, 2019
- Runtime: 93 minutes

The Relative Worlds (Japanese: ソウタイセカイ, Hepburn: Sōtai Sekai) is a Japanese CG original net animation (ONA) series planned and produced by Craftar. The anime is divided into two parts: the first part was released on Hulu Japan on April 28, 2017, with the second part releasing on May 5, 2017.

In October 2018, Craftar revealed that a film adaptation titled Even if the World Will End Tomorrow (Japanese: あした世界が終わるとしても, Hepburn: Ashita Sekai ga Owaru Toshitemo) would be released. The film premiered on January 25, 2019. The film follows a slightly altered plot, with the staff and most of the main cast of the ONA returning to reprise their roles.

== Plot ==
=== Sōtai Sekai ===
The story is set in Japan year 2020. Focuses on Shin Hazama, a third-year high school student who just lost his father. He encounters a version of himself who has spent a different life in another Japan, Jin. That's when he knew that the everyday life he has starts to crack, and battle between another world and another self begins.

=== Ashita Sekai ===
The film centers on Shin and Kotori, who are both third years in high school. Shin lost his mother when he was little, and since then he has a tendency to close himself off. Kotori is his childhood friend who always looks out for him. One day, another "self" from another Japan appears in front of them.

== Cast ==
Shin Hazama (狭間 真, Hazama Shin)
Voiced by: Yūki Kaji (ONA, movie)
Shin is a high school student who recently lost his father and moves in with his uncle Tetsuya. One day, he meets Jin, his other self from a parallel universe who wants to kill Kotori, as it'll end the suppressive reign of Kotori's other self in the parallel world, Princess Kotoko.
Jin Hazama (ハザマジン)
Voiced by: Yūki Kaji (ONA), Yoshiki Nakajima (movie)
Jin comes from an oppressive version of Japan where it is under the ironclad rule of Princess Kotoko. After the death of his father, he sets out to a parallel universe to kill Kotoko's other self while facing obstacles in his way.
Kotori Izumi (泉琴 莉, Izumi Kotori)
Voiced by: Maaya Uchida (ONA, movie)
Kotori is Shin's childhood friend who has always tried to be there for him despite his reluctance. She is the target of the parallel world attacks as her other-self is an oppressive ruler.
Kotoko Izumi (イズミコトコ)
Voiced by: Maaya Uchida (ONA), Sayaka Senbongi (movie)
Princess Kotoko is an ironclad oppressive ruler who controls Japan.
Miko (ミコ)
Voiced by: Aoi Yuki (ONA, movie)
Miko is a fixer who comes into contact and makes a contract with Kotori.
Niko (ニコ)
Voiced by: Aoi Yuki (ONA)
Riko (リコ)
Voiced by: Inori Minase (movie)
Miko's "younger sister" and Kotoko's fixer.
Genji Hazama
Voiced by: Kenjiro Tsuda (movie)
Genji is Shin's father. He is a scientist who suddenly dies from an unnatural cause.
Shū Izumi
Voiced by: Toshiyuki Morikawa (movie)
Shu is Kotori's father. Shin's father works for him.
Yūri
Voiced by: Nana Mizuki (movie)
Yuri is a scientist and the head of a mysterious research project that she is cooperating with Princess Kotoko on, behind the scenes.

== Production ==
Hakuhodo's animation studio, Craftar, planned and produced the series, while Yūhei Sakuragi directed and wrote the screenplay. Hidehiro Kawai composed the music. PALOW. did the character design while Rui Tomono did the concept art. Craftar and Lucky Pictures collaborated on CGI production, where they used the Unity game engine for rendering as well as crowd shots. Three-member unit Reol performed both the opening and ending theme, titled "VIP KID" and "ChiruChiru" (ちるちる), respectively.

Singer Aimyon performed the film's theme song, as well as the insert song Ra, no Hanashi. This marked her debut contributing work for an anime.

== Release ==
The film adpation of The Relative Worlds was screened in competition during the 2019 Annecy International Animated Film Festival.

The film premiered in the UK at Scotland Loves Animation 2019.
