= Doomsday With My Dog =

Japanese manga series

- Cover of Doomsday With My Dog volume 1 by Kadokawa Shoten

世界の終わりに柴犬と (Sekai no Owari ni Shiba Inu to)
- Genre: Post-apocalyptic
- Manga
- Written by: Yū Isihara
- Published by: Kadokawa Shoten
- English publisher: NA: Yen Press
- Imprint: MF Comics
- Magazine: ComicWalker
- Original run: March 2018 – present
- Volumes: 4
- Original net animation
- Directed by: Sorosoro Tanigawa
- Studio: DLE
- Licensed by: Sentai Filmworks
- Released: August 2, 2022 – February 5, 2023
- Runtime: 1-2 minutes
- Episodes: 72

Doomsday With My Dog (世界の終わりに柴犬と, Sekai no Owari ni Shiba Inu to; "At the End of the World With My Shiba Inu") is a Japanese four-panel manga series written and illustrated by Yū Isihara. Originally published as a web manga on Twitter, it was later picked up for serialization by Kadokawa Corporation, who then began serializing the series on their ComicWalker website in March 2018. The series has been compiled into four tankōbon volumes by Kadokawa Shoten as of October 2022. An original net (ONA) anime adaptation by DLE was released on YouTube from August 2022 to February 2023.

== Characters ==
Master (ご主人, Goshujin)
Voiced by: Maaya Uchida
Haru the Dog (ハルさん, Haru-san)
Voiced by: Mutsumi Tamura

== Media ==
=== Manga ===
At Anime Expo 2022, Yen Press announced that they licensed the series for English publication.

No.	Original release date	Original ISBN	English release date	English ISBN
1	November 21, 2018	978-4-04-065026-5	January 17, 2023	978-1-97-536183-9
2	November 22, 2019	978-4-04-064072-3	April 18, 2023	978-1-97-536500-4
3	December 23, 2020	978-4-04-680054-1	August 22, 2023	978-1-97-536502-8
4	October 21, 2022	978-4-04-681708-2	February 20, 2024	978-1-97-537201-9

=== Anime ===
On June 7, 2022, an original net (ONA) anime adaptation was announced. It is animated by DLE and directed by Sorosoro Tanigawa, and was released on YouTube from August 2, 2022, to February 5, 2023. Sentai Filmworks has licensed the series.
