= Chaser Game =

"CHASER GAME"

Single by Maaya Uchida
- Released: September 16, 2022
- Genre: J-Pop
- Length: 3:08
- Label: Pony Canyon
- Songwriters: Meeko Yamamoto y0c1e
- Producer: Akihiro Tomita

Maaya Uchida singles chronology
"Kikoeru?" (2022)	"CHASER GAME" (2022)	"Loudhailer" (2023)

"Chaser Game" (stylized all caps) is a song recorded by Japanese voice actress and singer Maaya Uchida. It will be released on September 16, 2022, as Uchida's first digital single. It is being used as the opening theme for the television drama of the same name. The song was later decided to be included in Uchida's 14th single released on January 25, 2023, Loudhailer.

== Track listings ==
Digital
No.	Title	Lyrics	Music	Arrangement	Length
1.	"CHASER GAME"	Meeko Yamamoto	y0c1e	y0c1e	3:08
Total length:					3:08

== Recorded single ==
Song	Single	Release date	Note
CHASER GAME	『Loudhailer』	January 25, 2023	14th Single
