= Takunomi =

Japanese manga series

- Cover art of the first volume

たくのみ。
- Genre: Comedy, slice of life
- Manga
- Written by: Haruto Hino
- Published by: Shogakukan
- Imprint: Ura Sunday Comics
- Magazine: Ura Sunday; MangaONE
- Original run: August 19, 2015 – May 25, 2018
- Volumes: 7
- Anime television series
- Directed by: Tomoki Kobayashi
- Written by: Katsuhiko Takayama
- Music by: Masato Suzuki
- Studio: Production IMS
- Licensed by: NA: Sentai Filmworks
- Original network: TBS, Sun TV, BS-TBS
- Original run: January 11, 2018 – March 29, 2018
- Episodes: 12

Takunomi (たくのみ。; lit. 'Drinking at Home') is a Japanese four-panel comedy manga series written and illustrated by Haruto Hino. It was serialized on Shogakukan's online app MangaONE and Ura Sunday website from August 2015 to May 2018, with its chapters collected in seven tankōbon volumes. An anime television series adaptation by Production IMS aired from January to March 2018. The anime series was the final one to be produced by Production IMS before its bankruptcy.

== Plot ==
20-year-old Michiru arrives in Tokyo where she will start a new job and big-city lifestyle, moving into Stella House Haruno, a women-only share house. The three other young women there — Kae, Makoto and Nao — welcome her warmly, and as they live their lives they experience a variety of Japanese alcoholic drinks, one featured per episode.

== Characters ==
Michiru Amatsuki (天月 みちる, Amatsuki Michiru)
Voiced by: Ayaka Imamura (Japanese); Juliet Simmons (English)
A woman who moves from the smaller city of Okayama to experience the fashionable Tokyo lifestyle. She is always cheerful, eager to learn and work. She is still discovering alcohol.
Nao Kiriyama (桐山 直, Kiriyama Nao)
Voiced by: Chika Anzai (Japanese); Christina Kelly (English)
A clothing store employee and Makoto's older sister. She is carefree, eager to party, and often drinks to excess.
Kae Midorikawa (緑川 香枝, Midorikawa Kae)
Voiced by: Mikako Komatsu (Japanese); Kara Greenberg (English)
A wedding planner, whose occupation is in sharp contrast to her personal lack of success with men. Being responsible and the house cook, she is a mother figure to the other girls, although alcohol has been shown to bring out her more free-wheeling "Sexy Dynamite Kae" personality. Her favorite drink is wine.
Makoto Kiriyama (桐山 真, Kiriyama Makoto)
Voiced by: Maaya Uchida (Japanese); Kira Vincent-Davis (English)
A university student and Nao's younger sister. In contrast to her sister she is calm and reasoned. She prefers sweet cocktails.

== Media ==
=== Manga ===
Takunomi is written and illustrated by Haruto Hino. It was serialized on Shogakukan's online app MangaONE and Ura Sunday website from August 19, 2015, to May 25, 2018. Shogakukan collected its chapters in seven tankōbon volumes, released from December 18, 2015, to July 12, 2018.

==== Volumes ====
No.	Release date	ISBN
1	December 18, 2015	978-4-09-126685-9
2	June 17, 2016	978-4-09-127309-3
3	December 12, 2016	978-4-09-123817-7
4	August 10, 2017	978-4-09-127745-9
5	December 19, 2017	978-4-09-124180-1
6	February 16, 2018	978-4-09-124283-9
7	July 12, 2018	978-4-09-128420-4

=== Anime ===
An anime television series adaptation directed by Tomoki Kobayashi and produced by Production IMS aired from January 11 to March 29, 2018. The series consists of 15-minute episodes, and ran for 12 episodes, sharing a time-slot with the second season of Dagashi Kashi. Shinpei Kobayashi designed the characters while Katsuhiko Takayama the screenplay. The sound company for the series was Magic Capsule and the music production was by Pony Canyon. The opening theme is "aventure bleu" by Maaya Uchida and the ending theme is "Stoic ni Detox" by Mashinomi. Sentai Filmworks have licensed the series and streamed it on Hidive.

==== Episodes ====
No.	Title (Note: All English episode titles are taken from Hidive.)	Original release date
1	"Yebisu Beer"; Transliteration: "Ebisubīru" (Japanese: エビスビール)	January 11, 2018
2	"Shochu Highball"; Transliteration: "Shōchū haibōru" (Japanese: 焼酎ハイボール)	January 18, 2018
3	"Suiyoubi no Neko"; Transliteration: "Suiyōbi no Neko" (Japanese: 水曜日のネコ)	January 25, 2018
4	"Hyoketsu"; Transliteration: "Hyōketsu" (Japanese: 氷結)	February 1, 2018
5	"Kitty"; Transliteration: "Kiti" (Japanese: キティ)	February 8, 2018
6	"Dassai"; Transliteration: "Dassai" (Japanese: 獺祭)	February 15, 2018
7	"Coffee Rum"; Transliteration: "Kaferamu" (Japanese: カフェラム)	February 22, 2018
8	"Kakubin"; Transliteration: "Kakubin" (Japanese: 角瓶)	March 1, 2018
9	"Otoko Ume Sour"; Transliteration: "Otoko ume sawā" (Japanese: 男梅サワー)	March 8, 2018
10	"Orion Beer"; Transliteration: "Orion bīru" (Japanese: オリオンビール)	March 15, 2018
11	"Daishichi"; Transliteration: "Daishichi" (Japanese: 大七)	March 22, 2018
12	"Asahi Super Dry"; Transliteration: "Asahisūpādorai" (Japanese: アサヒスーパードライ)	March 29, 2018
