= Kodou Escalation =

Single by Maaya Uchida

from the album HIKARI
- B-side: "Flag Ship"
- Released: July 10, 2019
- Genre: J-POP
- Length: 3:52
- Label: Pony Canyon
- Songwriters: hotaru Tom-H@ck
- Producer: Akihiro Tomita

Maaya Uchida singles chronology
"youthful beautiful" (2018)	"Kodou Escalation" (2019)	"No Scenario" (2020)

Music video
- Maaya Uchida "Kodou Escalation" Music Video on YouTube

"Kodou Escalation" (鼓動エスカレーション(), lit. Beating Escalation) is Japanese voice actress and singer Maaya Uchida's 9th single, released on July 10, 2019. The titular song from the single was used as the ending theme for the anime Ace of Diamond Act II.

== Track listings ==
CD
No.	Title	Lyrics	Music	Arrangement	Length
1.	"Kodou Escalation" (鼓動エスカレーション)	hotaru	Tom-H@ck	KanadeYUK, Tom-H@ck	3:52
2.	"Flag Ship"	PA-NON	fu_mou	fu_mou	4:44
3.	"Kodou Escalation" (Instrumental)				3:52
4.	"Flag Ship" (Instrumental)				4:42
Total length:					17:10

DVD (Limited Edition only)
No.	Title	Length
1.	"Kodou Escalation" (MUSIC VIDEO)
2.	"Kodou Escalation" (OFF SHOT)
3.	"Kodou Escalation" (MAKING)

== Charts ==
Chart (2019)	Peak position
Oricon Weekly Singles Chart	10
Billboard JAPAN Hot 100	25
Billboard JAPAN Hot Animation	6
Billboard JAPAN Top Singles Sales	11

== Event ==
- 『 Maaya Party！9』 Maaya Uchida 9th Single Release Event「Maaya Party！9」（July 20, 2019 - July 28, 2019：Osaka, Aichi, Tokyo）

== Album ==
Song	Album	Release date	Note
Kodou Escalation	『HIKARI』	October 27, 2021	3rd Album
Flag Ship	『HIKARI』	October 27, 2021	3rd Album
