= Strobe Memory =

Single by Maaya Uchida

from the album HIKARI
- B-side: "Canary youthful beautiful -y0c1e Remix-"
- Released: May 12, 2021
- Genre: J-POP
- Length: 4:45
- Label: Pony Canyon
- Songwriter: RIRIKO
- Producer: Akihiro Tomita

Maaya Uchida singles chronology
"Heartbeat City/Itsuka Kumo ga Haretanara" (2020)	"Strobe Memory" (2021)	"Kikoeru?" (2022)

Music video
- Maaya Uchida "Strobe Memory" Music Video on YouTube

"Strobe Memory" (ストロボメモリー) is Japanese Voice Actress and singer Maaya Uchida's 12th single, released on May 12, 2021. The titular song from the single was used as the ending theme for the anime SSSS.Dynazenon.

== Track listings ==
CD
No.	Title	Lyrics	Music	Arrangement	Length
1.	"Strobe Memory" (ストロボメモリー)	RIRIKO	RIRIKO	RIRIKO	4:45
2.	"Canary" (カナリア)	Meeko Yamamoto	y0c1e	y0c1e	4:35
3.	"youthful beautiful" (y0c1e Remix)	RIRIKO	RIRIKO	y0c1e	5:17
4.	"Strobe Memory" (Instrumental)				4:45
5.	"Canary" (Instrumental)				4:35
Total length:					23:57

DVD (Limited Edition only)
No.	Title	Length
1.	"Strobe Memory" (MUSIC VIDEO)
2.	"Strobe Memory" (OFF SHOT)
3.	"Strobe Memory" (MAKING)

== Charts ==
Chart (2021)	Peak position
Oricon Weekly Singles Chart	10
Billboard JAPAN Hot Animation	19
Billboard JAPAN Top Singles Sales	10

== Event ==
- 『 Maaya Party！12』 Maaya Uchida 12th Single Release Event「Maaya Party！12」（May 22, 2021 – May 23, 2021：Online）

== Album ==
Song	Album	Release date	Note
Strobe Memory	『HIKARI』	October 27, 2021	3rd Album
