= Youthful Beautiful =

Single by Maaya Uchida

from the album HIKARI
- B-side: "Kimi no Heroine de Irutame ni"
- Released: October 17, 2018
- Genre: J-POP
- Length: 4:37
- Label: Pony Canyon
- Songwriter: RIRIKO
- Producer: Akihiro Tomita

Maaya Uchida singles chronology
"aventure bleu" (2018)	"Youthful Beautiful" (2018)	"Kodou Escalation" (2019)

Music video
- Maaya Uchida "youthful beautiful" Music Video on YouTube

"Youthful Beautiful" (stylized in all lowercase letters) is Japanese voice actress and singer Maaya Uchida's 8th single, released on October 17, 2018. The titular song from the single was used as the ending theme for the anime SSSS.Gridman.

== Track listings ==
CD
No.	Title	Lyrics	Music	Arrangement	Length
1.	"youthful beautiful"	RIRIKO	RIRIKO	Yusuke Shirato, RIRIKO	4:37
2.	"Kimi no Heroine de Irutame ni" (君のヒロインでいるために)	Masayoshi Ōishi	Masayoshi Ōishi	Masayoshi Ōishi	4:37
3.	"youthful beautiful" (Instrumental)				4:37
4.	"Kimi no Heroine de Irutame ni" (Instrumental)				4:35
Total length:					18:26

DVD (Limited Edition only)
No.	Title	Length
1.	"youthful beautiful" (MUSIC VIDEO)
2.	"youthful beautiful" (OFF SHOT)
3.	"youthful beautiful" (MAKING)

== Charts ==
Chart (2018)	Peak position
Oricon Weekly Singles Chart	7
Billboard JAPAN Hot 100	13
Billboard JAPAN Hot Animation	2
Billboard JAPAN Top Singles Sales	8

== Event ==
- 『 Maaya Party！8』 Maaya Uchida 8th Single Release Event「Maaya Party！8」（November 3, 2018 - November 24, 2018：Osaka, Aichi, Tokyo）

== Album ==
Song	Album	Release date	Note
youthful beautiful	『HIKARI』	October 27, 2021	3rd Album
