= No Scenario =

Single by Maaya Uchida

from the album HIKARI
- B-side: "Love for All Stars"
- Released: March 18, 2020
- Genre: J-POP
- Length: 4:31
- Label: Pony Canyon
- Songwriter: Shou Watanabe
- Producer: Akihiro Tomita

Maaya Uchida singles chronology
"Kodou Escalation" (2019)	"No Scenario" (2020)	"Heartbeat City/Itsuka Kumo ga Haretanara" (2020)

Music video
- Maaya Uchida "No Scenario" Music Video on YouTube

"No Scenario" (ノーシナリオ) is Japanese voice actress and singer Maaya Uchida's 10th single, released on March 18, 2020.

== Track listings ==
CD
No.	Title	Lyrics	Music	Arrangement	Length
1.	"No Scenario" (ノーシナリオ)	Shou Watanabe	Shou Watanabe	Yusuke Shirato	4:31
2.	"Love for All Stars"	ZAQ	ZAQ	Yusuke Shirato	5:11
3.	"No Scenario" (Instrumental)				4:31
4.	"Love for All Stars" (Instrumental)				5:10
Total length:					19:23

DVD (Limited Edition only)
No.	Title	Length
1.	"No Scenario" (MUSIC VIDEO)
2.	"No Scenario" (OFF SHOT)
3.	"No Scenario" (MAKING)

== Charts ==
Chart (2020)	Peak position
Oricon Weekly Singles Chart	12
Billboard JAPAN Hot 100	62
Billboard JAPAN Hot Animation	9
Billboard JAPAN Top Singles Sales	12

== Album ==
Song	Album	Release date	Note
No Scenario	『HIKARI』	October 27, 2021	3rd Album
Love for All Stars	『HIKARI』	October 27, 2021	3rd Album
