= Gatchaman Crowds =

Japanese anime television series

- Promotional poster featuring main characters (bottom left to right) Joe, Sugane, Paiman, Hajime, J.J., OD, Utsutsu, (top) Rui and Katze.

ガッチャマン クラウズ (Gatchaman Kurauzu)
- Created by: Tatsunoko
- Anime television series
- Directed by: Kenji Nakamura
- Produced by: Manabu Tamura; Toshio Nakatani; Seiji Yabashi; Atsushi Kirimoto; Ai Morikawa
- Written by: Toshiya Ōno
- Music by: Taku Iwasaki
- Studio: Tatsunoko Production
- Licensed by: AUS: Hanabee; NA: Sentai Filmworks; UK: Animatsu Entertainment
- Original network: Nippon TV
- English network: SEA: Animax Asia
- Original run: July 12, 2013 – September 28, 2013
- Episodes: 12 + OVA
- Anime television series

Gatchaman Crowds Insight
- Directed by: Hideki Itō (Chief); Kenji Nakamura
- Produced by: Seiji Yabashi; Atsushi Kirimoto; Ai Morikawa; Hiroyuki Inage
- Written by: Toshiya Ōno
- Music by: Taku Iwasaki
- Studio: Tatsunoko Production
- Licensed by: AUS: Hanabee; NA: Sentai Filmworks; UK: Animatsu Entertainment
- Original network: Nippon TV
- English network: SEA: Animax Asia
- Original run: July 5, 2015 – September 26, 2015
- Episodes: 12 + Special

Gatchaman Crowds (ガッチャマンクラウズ, Gatchaman Kurauzu) is a 2013 anime television series produced by Tatsunoko Production and directed by Kenji Nakamura. It is a part of the Gatchaman franchise. The first season aired between July 12 and September 27, 2013, and the second season, titled Gatchaman Crowds Insight, started with a prologue episode streamed on Hulu on June 20 before first airing on July 4 and finishing on September 26, 2015.

== Premise ==
=== Crowds ===
Early summer of 2015 in the city of Tachikawa, Japan. A "second metropolis" of Tokyo, Tachikawa is protected by the Gatchaman, warriors who fight in special reinforced suits called NOTE powered by the manifestation of their spiritual powers. After the introduction of their newest member, the energetic and cheerful Hajime Ichinose, the Gatchaman is tasked with fighting against a mysterious alien life form known as MESS and deal with Berg Katze, an enigmatic alien creature who, having destroyed several planets, has turned his attention to Earth.

=== Insight ===
A year has passed since the "Tachikawa Incident" in summer 2015. CROWDS, the system that turns the mentality of humans into physical form that Berg Katze gave to Rui Ninomiya after extracting his NOTE, has spread among the public. Prime Minister Sugayama backs up the plan, but not everyone agrees with his policy. However, A mysterious organization known as VAPE attacks Sugayama's vehicle, marking the start of a series of new conflicts.

== Characters ==
=== Gatchaman ===
Hajime Ichinose (一ノ瀬 はじめ, Ichinose Hajime) /(G-101)
Voiced by: Maaya Uchida (Japanese); Jessica Calvello (English)
A 16-year-old high school girl living in Tachikawa City, who is a new member of the G-Crew. She is lively and energetic, has an artistic spirit and a peculiar way of talking as well as an inventive point of view. She is an avid collector of stationery and usually gets overly excited when she finds an item that piques her interest. She is put under the responsibility of Sugane, but usually disobeys his orders and acts on her own. Her actions, despite seeming irresponsible at first, usually bring positive and unexpected results never before seen in Gatchaman activity as shown when she manages to communicate with the MESS and free all the humans it had previously absorbed. After learning about Berg Katze, she attempts to understand the alien while simultaneously opposing its plan to make the world burn by revealing to the public that the Gatchaman exist and supporting Rui in his attempt to retake control over the CROWDS and X from the alien. Mysteriously, however, she is last shown merged with Berg Katze in the ending of the first season with no explanation provided until the director's cut was released, showing how she was able to catch the alien off guard by finally seeing that it was actually inside everyone the whole time, shearing his long hair with her scissors and then shoving his NOTE into her chest after kissing him.
In Insight she becomes responsible for mentoring Tsubasa as a new Gatchaman. Curiously one of the rare ones (besides Yuruji) to produce a white speech balloon upon Gelsadra using his powers, Hajime shows serious doubts upon learning of Tsubasa and Gelsadra's plan to unite everybody as one mind in order to avoid any form of conflict, eventually teaching them that having individuality and the occasional conflicts that come from it is what makes people human. In order to defeat the seemlingly endless army of Kuu-samas and save Gelsadra, she devises a plan to give the public a live broadcast of Gelsadra being executed by the Gatchaman, as they desired, but in actuality the Gelsadra they witnessed was actually her under a disguise created using Berg Katze's powers, falling into a coma from the serious injuries she sustained. As a result the public realises how drastic their desires have become, killing off the mood, which eliminates most of the Kuu-sama along with it. After a month-long election to allow the public to rethink their views on Gelsadra, which concludes in him being allowed to stay, she wakes up to everyone's happiness.

Hajime's Gatchaman form has the appearance of girl with pink pigtails and fights with large scissors and other stationery-based tools. She possesses the white Designer's NOTE (デザイナーのNOTE, Dezainā no Nōto), and gains Berg Katze's Schadenfreude NOTE after fusing herself with them. Her original NOTE and Gatchaman form takes on red accents after fusing with Katze, and her Gatchaman form's face switches from blue eyes to a red smile when Katze is in command.
Sugane Tachibana (橘 清音, Tachibana Sugane)(G-96)
Voiced by: Ryōta Ōsaka (Japanese); Corey Hartzog (English)
A serious, dutiful young man with a bearing like that of a samurai. He has a strong sense of justice and is devoted to doing his job as a Gatchaman properly at the expense of enjoying his life as much as he could. He always carries his katana. He has been with the G-Crew for five years and is baffled by Hajime when she first joins, leaving him to think of things he had never thought were possible. Initially, he finds Hajime annoying and inconsiderate, but over time he begins to understand her more and become influenced by her behavior to the extent that he later approaches J.J. to tell him they no longer need his predictions as they can handle the situation involving Berg Katze by themselves. Among the members of the G-Crew, he respects Joe greatly and several flashbacks reveal that Joe had saved him from the MESS as a child. The incident left a strong, lasting impression on Sugane when Joe told him to one day save someone like he had done, which led up to Sugane becoming a member of the G-Crew afterward. In the second season, Sugane starts wearing glasses and attends the local university where he has gained a number of female fans, but he later gets disappointed on them upon knowing that they were not their true friends and were just hanging out with him because he was a Gatchaman.
Sugane's Gatchaman form is modeled after a swan and relies on Iaijutsu techniques. His Gatchaman form also displays incredible agility and the ability to stand on walls and ceilings. He possesses the black Infinite Reach NOTE (無限間合のNOTE, Mugen Maai no Nōto).

Joe Hibiki (枇々木 丈, Hibiki Jō)(G-89)
Voiced by: Daisuke Namikawa (Japanese); Ty Mahany (English)
A Tokyo University graduate who has been on the G-Crew for 10 years. He is aloof, cynical, has low self-esteem and seemingly little interest in doing his job as a Gatchaman. He is revealed to have saved Sugane from the MESS and mentoring him when he first joined. After encountering Berg Katze some time after Hajime joins the G-Crew, he realizes the danger the alien poses to humanity and sets out to defeat it. However, he ends up losing badly to Berg Katze in the ensuing fight, and gives up on trying again until Sugane eventually reaches out to him, thanking Joe for saving him and reviving his enthusiasm and passion for work by reminding him of what it means to be a hero. He works for the town hall's "Living Safety Department" during the day, while wearing glasses and maintaining a clean, handsome appearance. However, at night, he lets his hair down (revealing some inner orange hair), removes his glasses, and becomes a heavy drinker and smoker, though he gives up smoking and starts consuming lollipops during Insight. He also plays darts regularly and has stated his dream is world peace. In Insight he has become the mayor's secretary and opposes Rui in allowing the public to use the CROWDS after seeing the harm they are capable of when Rizumu's red CROWDS terrorize a city. As a result, he assists Gelsadra in his run for prime minister in order to abolish them.
Joe's Gatchaman form is modeled after an oni and can manipulate flames, fly using jet propulsion, and launch its forearms. He possesses the red Explosive Flame NOTE (爆炎のNOTE, Bakuen no Nōto)

O.D (O・D, Ō Dī)/(G-12)
Voiced by: Daisuke Hosomi (Japanese); Clint Bickham (English)
A half-alien who runs the CAGE — the Gatchaman base of operations — in addition to being a part of the G-Crew. O.D. usually displays a flamboyant, playful personality when around others, but possesses a grim, serious demeanor that is shown upon discovering Berg Katze has arrived to spread chaos among the human race. O.D. is often accompanied by a cat named Altair (アルタイル, Arutairu), called "Al" for short. O.D. also gets along very well with Utsutsu, who at first opens up only when the two of them are together. They are roommates and seem close like a family.
O.D. has the self-appointed title of "a sad Gatchaman who can't transform", thus rendering the half-alien unable to participate in missions. Later, it is revealed that O.D's Gatchaman powers are so strong, the entire world could be destroyed when they are activated, and those powers were in fact responsible for destroying O.D's parent's planet in the past. O.D. eventually confronts Berg Katze after the alien wreaks havoc in Tachikawa City and uses those powers in the fight against Katze. Despite sustaining heavy injuries in the battle O.D. manages to subdue Berg Katze for a while and retrieve Rui's NOTE in order to return it to Rui and resolve the conflict. O.D. possesses the green NOTE of Destruction (崩壊のNOTE, Hōkai no Nōto). In Insight O.D. has become a regular guest of the popular Millione Show and provides commentary on ongoing issues such as the CROWDS.

Utsutsu Miya (宮 うつつ, Miya Utsutsu)/(G-99)
Voiced by: Kotori Koiwai (Japanese); Carli Mosier (English)
A first-year student attending the Tachikawa Private Academy for the Gifted. She has been part of the G-Crew for two years. She works as a volunteer taking care of the flowers at the Tachikawa City International Greenery Garden. She does not have a very positive image of herself, and fears getting closer to others because she thinks her powers would scare them away. The only one she can initially speak to normally is O.D., with whom she lives, though she eventually warms up to others after Hajime approaches her and encourages her to accept herself. She appears to be fond of making origami, as she is shown happily folding a red piece of paper that Hajime gives her into the shape of a frog. Her catchphrase, and just about the only thing she would originally say to anyone is "I'm gloomy (うつうつします, Utsuutsu shimasu)", which is a pun on her name. She usually wears a bikini while in the Gatchaman's base, the CAGE, and tends to the plants inside. In Insight she assists Paiman in taking care of the children in his new daycare and later goes out to help his political campaign when he tries running for prime minister.
Utsutsu has the ability to create perfect, independent copies of herself, which are connected to her by a mild mental link, effectively allowing her to be in multiple places at once. She also exhibits an ability to drain life energy from living things with her right hand and give it to others with her left, though overusing the latter puts her life at risk unless she takes life force from something else. This trait also carries over to her Gatchaman form, modeled after a girl wearing a hooded outfit, which possesses two extendable arms ending in large, clawed hands. She possesses the chartreuse NOTE of Life and Death (誕生と死のNOTE, Tanjō to Shi no Nōto).

Paiman (パイマン)/(G-3)
Voiced by: Aya Hirano (Japanese); Luci Christian (English)
The team leader, a choleric alien Gatchaman dispatched on Earth by J.J., and the longest running member of the G-Crew, going back hundreds of years. Paiman has complete trust and respect for J.J. and his prophecies and gives the team orders largely based on those prophecies. Paiman demands respect, tact, and obedience from its fellow Gatchaman, but its outbursts of anger are often ignored, especially by Hajime. A heavy drinker, Paiman often drowns its sorrows and confides about its worries to fellow alien and good friend O.D. Paiman has a similar appearance to a panda, but dislikes being referred to as one. Despite this, it has a large collection of panda merchandise stashed in its room.
Its anxiety makes it hard for it to question orders and take action beyond the usual proceedings. Its anxiety worsens when Berg Katze appears because of personal history with the alien. Influenced by its fears, Paiman ran away scared when about to be confronted with Katze, leaving Hajime and Utsutsu behind. However, its determination to protect humankind grows while making friends with the children of a local kindergarten. This determination leads to Paiman charging into battle alongside the team when Tachikawa was under attack by the Neo Hundred CROWDS, with Paiman's eyes notably switching from black to a light grey colour. In Insight it opens up a new daycare center and after seeing Gelsadra, an alien, running for prime minister, Paiman attempts to run as well but gets in trouble for bribing voters with stuffed pandas, and later loses to Gelsadra.

Paiman's Gatchaman form is a large beast that is able to convert to a wheeled vehicle form that travels at high speeds and carries other passengers. Paiman possesses the pink Universal Transformation NOTE (変換自在のNOTE, Henkan Jizai no Nōto)
Rui Ninomiya (爾乃美家 累, Ninomiya Rui)/(G-100)
Voiced by: Ayumu Murase (Japanese); Shannon Emerick (English)
A young adult living on the top floor in the high-class mansion-apartment building Glorious Tower Toyosu in Tokyo's Koto ward. His trump card is his superb intellect. He is trilingual, being able to speak English, Japanese, and Chinese. After educating himself using educational websites and learning how to write code from hackers around the world, he developed the social networking service "GALAX", which gaining widespread popularity over 200 million users worldwide. He believes that the current society is flawed and claims that it is his duty to improve it for the better, thus "upgrading the world". When in public, Rui dresses usually as a blonde girl in punk rocker fashion, and is known by GALAX users as LOAD. Among GALAX users, Rui selected one hundred individuals, known as The Hundred, to use a system known as CROWDS to assist in disasters. Upon meeting Hajime and confirming the existence of Gatchaman, Rui attempts to persuade her, Utsutsu and Sugane to stop being Gatchaman, as the concept of "superheroes" would be obsolete in the upgraded world. Rui also believes that people would become too reliant on Gatchaman to solve problems and prevent disasters. After Katze takes over the GALAX network using his form, Rui joins the Gatchaman in an attempt to thwart him. After Berg Katze is stopped, Rui allows the CROWDS system to be used by any individual, ushering a new time of peace and prosperity for the country, until the appearance of the VAPE organization in Insight, which shows the world the dangers such powers could cause in wrong hands in order to undermine it.
Rui also possesses his own NOTE, with a different logo on the cover due to it being extracted by Berg Katze instead of J.J, but he refrains from using its powers despite Berg's attempts to make him do so. Later on its logo changes to the same one seen on those used by the G-Crew when O.D returns it to him after it was stolen by Berg Katze, indicating he has officially become one of them. As a Gatchaman, Rui has the power to travel instantly from a place to another through communication systems and open portals for the other Gatchamen to use, as well as dealing powerful electric attacks. He possesses the purple Codec NOTE (コーデックのNOTE, Kōdekku no Nōto).

Tsubasa Misudachi (三栖立 つばさ, Misudachi Tsubasa)/(G-60)
Voiced by: Kaori Ishihara (Japanese); Chelsea McCurdy (English)
A 16-year-old second year high school student from Nagaoka in Niigata Prefecture. She joins the G-Crew in the second season and becomes Hajime's new partner. She has an impulsive personality and slips into her home city's dialect when angry. Her dream is to become a pyrotechnician like her great-grandfather. She hates conflict, and as a result of meeting Gelsadra, who shares her ideals, she becomes his best friend and supporter, helping him become and even after he becomes prime minister. However, realizing how her influence caused Gelsadra to produce the Kuu-samas which are doing more harm than good, she seeks advice from her great-grandfather, who points out her greatest flaw was always taking in too much of atmosphere that she does not breathe properly to release the tension and think things through. This flaw was also the cause her being unable to transform into a Gatchaman at will, only subconsciously transforming when she gets angry. After clearing the issue up, she finally manages to properly transform to aid the other Gatchaman in defeating the Kuu-samas.
Her Gatchaman form is modelled after a girl with long black hair, wearing a cat-like helmet. Her powers are based on fireworks, and has the ability to convert herself into the hoverbike-like Matsukaze form. She possesses the blue Flash NOTE (閃光のNOTE, Senkō no Nōto).

J.J. Robinson (J・J・ロビンソン, Jē Jē Robinson)
Voiced by: Katsuji Mori (Japanese); Leraldo Anzaldua (English)
A member of the board of trustees, and the guardian of Earth. He is a man who has looked after lives born in the galaxy for many years. With the power to create NOTES from the essence of other beings, he chooses select individuals to join the Gatchaman and assigns missions to them based on his forecasts. He claims that there is an enemy existence that will be impossible to repel with the powers of science. J.J. is often seen making origami birds, each one representing a member of the G-Crew or another major player in the conflict. J.J. is portrayed by the same actor who voiced Ken the Eagle from the original series in the 1970's.

=== Antagonists ===
Berg Katze (ベルク・カッツェ, Beruku Kattse)
Voiced by: Mamoru Miyano (Japanese); David Wald (English)
An androgynous, mysterious alien, who is named after a main villain from the original series. Katze's main power is to assume any person's identity by kissing them, which the alien uses to frame people for crimes. Paiman and OD know about Katze, and according to them, Berg Katze is a malicious being whose purpose is to destroy every inhabited planet by turning individuals against one another. The one responsible for pulling out Rui's NOTE as well as Rizumu's NOTE from Insight, allowing them to manifest CROWDS and empower ordinary people. Katze speaks in internet slang and an exaggerated and insolent manner, and is almost entirely motivated by schadenfreude. Katze later steals Rui's appearance to take control of X, and by extension GALAX, in order to spread chaos by giving all the people previously placed on a blacklist access to the CROWDS, inciting them to attack governmental buildings to capture the prime minister Sugayama, and then moving on to allowing everyone access to the CROWDS after assuming Sugayama's appearance during a public message. In the end, O.D challenges the alien to a fight that Katze ends up losing due to the greater strength of O.D's powers and is left in a weakened state for a while, during which O.D, who was also badly injured, manages to take back Rui's NOTE and return it to Rui. This leads to restoring calm to the city following Rui's strategic plan of introducing online games to the CROWDS users that focus on helping people by the time Katze recovers. Unable to stir up any further conflict after waking up, Katze seemingly gives up to go on their 'date' with Hajime. Hajime works out how Katze moves around and, after cutting their hair, kisses and then forcibly inserts their NOTE into herself, containing Katze within herself.
Despite being unable to cause trouble, Katze usually still manifests in some way, speaking from within Hajime.

Katze owns the gold-coloured Schadenfreude NOTE (幸災楽禍のNOTE, Kōsairakuka no Nōto) with a unique symbol that reverts to the Gatchaman's original logo after Hajime fuses it into her own body, suggesting she has become its possessor. While transformed, the alien can turn invisible and remain unaffected by any attacks while delivering powerful attacks with either a guitar-like instrument or with the diamond-patterned chains covering Katze's form.
In Insight, Katze is said to have known Gelsadra, and ran away from him in fear.

Rizumu Suzuki (鈴木 理詰夢, Suzuki Rizumu)
Voiced by: Yūichirō Umehara (Japanese); Patrick Poole (English)
A 21-year-old medical student at the University of Tokyo who opposes the CROWDS system, claiming that mankind is not capable of properly making use of it. He is the ringleader of the mysterious terrorist organization "VAPE" (short for "Violent Apes"), composed of individuals using red-colored CROWDS. He also possesses a magenta-colored NOTE that he obtained from Berg Katze just like Rui did, but refrained from using it until the CROWDS system was established, after which he decided to use it in order to bring it down. At first he attempts to assassinate the prime minister Sugayama with the CROWDS while he is on board an airplane but is thwarted by the arrival of the Gatchaman team. Afterward, he attacks the citizens of Shibuya and spreads terror with the help of his CROWDS and compels Rui to surrender his NOTE to him or else he will harm the innocent people being held hostage. Once Rui gives him his NOTE, he proceeds to stab it with his dagger multiple times and nearly kills Rui from the ensuing damage (due to the NOTE being akin to a physical manifestation of the person's soul) until Tsubasa and Gelsadra rush to Rui's rescue, at which point Rizumu quickly surrenders and is apprehended.
After the Kuu-samas came to existence, he gets a call of help from President X, informing him that Rui has fallen victim to them and has become completely mindless and unmotivated. He easily breaks out of jail thanks to a warden who is also a member of VAPE, and has his organisation manipulate the social media to blame Gelsadra for the Kuu-samas' drastic acts of consuming people, while expressing his disappointment to Rui, waking him up. Witnessing the Gatchaman's solution to the problem has the public now properly thinking for themselves, he feels satisfied as he takes his leave.

Kuu-sama (くうさま, Kuusama)
Voiced by: Yurika Kubo, Marie Miyake (Japanese); Tiffany Grant (English)
Mysterious creatures that emerge from red speech balloons that are created when speech balloons leaked from Gelsadra fused with the public's unabsorbed speech balloons. They appear to be friendly, gentle beings that soothe people on an emotional level. They heavily rely on reading the atmosphere to determine their actions, mainly emphatising on the goal of everybody becoming one. They will, however, attack people who defy this belief, sapping away their individual will and eventually causing them to succumb to forever staying their comforts through hugs, or in the case of worse people, swallowing them up whole. It is implied that they are Gelsadra's new ability as a result of being influenced by Tsubasa, however because they act solely on what they think the people want, he has no control over them, eventually being targeted for elimination himself when Rizumu's manipulation of the social media turns the public against him. The Gatchaman attempted to fight them, but seeing that their numbers will not go down so long as the public's desire for Gelsadra's execution remains, Hajime devises a plan to give them what they want, broadcasting a live execution of Gelsadra(actually herself) by the Gatchaman. This made the public realize how horrible they have become, killing off the mood and most of the Kuu-samas as a result. A month later the remaining small population of Kuu-samas are shown to be getting along with the reinstated CROWDS.

=== Other characters ===
President X (総裁X, Sōsai Ekkusu)
Voiced by: Sakura Tange (Japanese); Jenni Strader (English)
X is an artificial intelligence created by Rui to oversee GALAX and perform data mining on all information gathered from its users globally to assist with his plans to update the world. It is a social interactive AI that can readily communicate with all its users. It often provides helpful information, resources or even directly contacts nearby GALAX users to resolve problems. Rui sees it as his friend and the only one he can actually trust. X seems to harbour similar feelings for Rui. When Berg Katze takes advantage of this by hijacking it by stealing Rui's form, X is shown to be surprised and upset at "Rui"'s change and sudden misdeeds. It reunites with Rui again though, after Rui tells it he saw the same sunset as X did before and thought the sky looked beautiful in contrast to the dismissive reply the fake Rui gave it. After Rui becomes an official Gatchaman, X is shown to connect with his transformed form where it provides him with constant support through the display screen on his chest, and is represented by the large X-shaped disc attached to his back. In Insight it has become involved in politics by allowing users to vote on who they want as mayor and even prime minister through their smart phones on GALAX, as well as allow the public to express their approval or disapproval in the current prime minister's actions with a new voting system.
Just like Katze, X is named after Sōsai X, the main villain from the original series and the primary antagonist.

Gelsadra (ゲルサドラ, Gerusadora)
Voiced by: Kana Hanazawa (Child), Tomokazu Sugita (Adult) (Japanese); Bryson Baugus (Child), Chris Patton (Adult) (English)
An alien who makes an emergency landing in a spaceship in front of Tsubasa's house, and becomes attached to her. Gelsadra has the power to materialize speech balloons over people's heads, that change according to their state of mind, with a few unusual exceptions, including Hajime and Yu whose balloons remain consistently grey. He regularly absorbs all the balloons around him in order to gain an understanding of the current situation, and then respond appropriately to improve the atmosphere and achieve a sense of unity. He is known for bringing peace to several planets using his powers and is placed under the protection of the G-Crew. He is named after a character from Gatchaman II.
After Rizumu terrorizes the people of Shibuya with his red CROWDS and harms Rui in the process, Gelsadra realizes the public wants a hero and assists Tsubasa in rescuing Rui to answer their wish. Later on, upon learning of the power and influence that a prime minister possesses, and particularly after Sugayama steps down in order to start another election that is open to anyone to enter, Gelsadra enters the political race with the goal of abolishing the CROWDS after reading the general atmosphere and deciding that people no longer want it. He also ages himself up from the youthful appearance of a child into an adult to instill confidence in the people voting for him. With Joe's help as well as a string of gaffes committed by Sugayama becoming viral, he easily wins the election and then passes a series of revolutionary political and social reforms to please the masses, starting with removing the entire cabinet, to lowering taxes and vastly improving social services.

However, Gelsadra eventually bloats up from the overabsorption of speech balloons, resulting in him being unable to absorb any more, much to his dismay, as well as his body expelling some of the speech bubbles. These speech bubbles would end up fusing with the public's unabsorbed speech bubbles to produce red-white-blue coloured creatures that Gelsadra eventually names "Kuu-sama". After Rizumu's manipulation of the social media turns the Kuu-samas against him, Hajime rescues him, and tells him to start thinking for himself instead of always relying on the public's opinion. Wishing to stay on Earth so he can be with Tsubasa, he releases all the speech balloons he had absorbed and returns to his child form. After Hajime's sacrifice with a month-long election for the public to rethink and decide his fate, he was allowed to stay on Earth.
Millio Toriyama (鳥山 ミリオ, Toriyama Mirio)
Voiced by: Junichi Suwabe
A popular host of the day show "Millione Shop" along with O.D. Millio is showy and speaks frankly.
Yū Misudachi (三栖立 悠, Misudachi Yū)
Voiced by: Shirō Saitō
Tsubasa's 99-year-old great-grandfather and a legendary veteran pyrotechnician. Everyone calls him "Yurujī". He's a bit stubborn and also lively for his age, claiming that Tsubasa is still too inexperienced to take part in his business.

== Episode list ==
The anime is the fifth Japanese-produced animation project and a reboot on the original 1972 anime series Science Ninja Team Gatchaman, and is directed by Kenji Nakamura. The series aired on NTV between July 12 and September 27, 2013, and was simulcast by Crunchyroll. A second season, titled Gatchaman Crowds insight, started airing on July 6, 2015. Animax Asia later aired the second series strarting on December 26, 2016.

The first season has been licensed by Sentai Filmworks and is streaming on The Anime Network. However, this license does not include "Embrace," the home video director's cut of episode 12.

For the first season, the opening theme is "Crowds" by White Ash whilst the ending theme is "Innocent Note" by Maaya Uchida. For the second season, the opening theme is "insight" by White Ash whilst the ending theme is "60 Oku no Tsubasa" (6 Billion Wings) by Angry Frog Rebirth.
