= Kikoeru? =

Single by Maaya Uchida
- B-side: "Sensation Dancin' Show♪"
- Released: April 20, 2022
- Genre: J-POP
- Length: 4:05
- Label: Pony Canyon
- Songwriters: Hideki Hayashi; Junichi Sato (fhana)
- Producer: Akihiro Tomita

Maaya Uchida singles chronology
"Strobe Memory" (2021)	"Kikoeru?" (2022)	"CHASER GAME" (2022)

Music video
- Maaya Uchida "Kikoeru?" Music Video on YouTube

"Kikoeru?" (聴こえる?(), lit. Can You Hear Me?) is Japanese voice actress and singer Maaya Uchida's 13th single, released on April 20, 2022. The titular song from the single was used as the ending theme for the anime Miss Shachiku and the Little Baby Ghost.

== Track listings ==
CD
No.	Title	Lyrics	Music	Arrangement	Length
1.	"Kikoeru?" (聴こえる?)	Hideki Hayashi	Junichi Sato (fhana)	Junichi Sato (fhana)	4:05
2.	"Sensation Dancin' Show♪"	Asuka Oda (Elements Garden)	Seima Kondo (Elements Garden)	Seima Kondo (Elements Garden)	3:55
3.	"Kikoeru?" (Instrumental)				4:05
4.	"Sensation Dancin' Show♪" (Instrumental)				3:54
Total length:					15:59

DVD (Limited Edition only)
No.	Title	Length
1.	"Kikoeru?" (MUSIC VIDEO)
2.	"Kikoeru?" (OFF SHOT)
3.	"Kikoeru?" (MAKING)

== Charts ==
Chart (2022)	Peak position
Oricon Weekly Singles Chart	12
Billboard JAPAN Top Singles Sales	14

== Event ==
- 『 Maaya Party！14』 Maaya Uchida 13th Single Release Event「Maaya Party！14」（May 21, 2022 - May 28, 2022：Osaka, Aichi, Tokyo）
