= Seisen Cerberus =

2011 video game by GREE

聖戦ケルベロス (Seisen Keruberosu)
- Genre: Sword and sorcery
- Video game
- Publisher: GREE
- Genre: Card battle
- Platform: Mobile game
- Released: 2011
- Manga

Seisen Cerberus: Mō Hitori no Eiyū
- Written by: Seijirō Narumi
- Published by: Kodansha
- Magazine: Bessatsu Shōnen Magazine
- Original run: 9 March 2013 – 9 October 2013
- Volumes: 2
- Anime television series

Seisen Cerberus: Ryūkoku no Fatalite
- Directed by: Nobuhiro Kondo
- Produced by: GENCO
- Written by: Hiroshi Ōnogi
- Music by: Hideakira Kimura; Nobuaki Nobusawa
- Studio: Bridge
- Original network: TV Tokyo, TVO, TVA, AT-X
- English network: SEA: Animax Asia
- Original run: 4 April 2016 – 27 June 2016
- Episodes: 13

Seisen Cerberus (聖戦ケルベロス, Seisen Keruberosu; lit. 'Holy War Cerberus') is a Japanese role-playing mobile game released by GREE. The series has been adapted separately into both a manga, titled Seisen Cerberus: Mō Hitori no Eiyū (聖戦ケルベロス～もう一人の英雄～, Seisen Keruberosu ～ Mō Hitori no Eiyū ～), and an anime television series, titled Seisen Cerberus: Ryūkoku no Fatalite (聖戦ケルベロス 竜刻のファタリテ, Seisen Keruberosu Ryūkoku no Fatarite; lit. Holy War Cerberus: Fatalité of Dragon Time). The manga was published by Kodansha in 2013, while the anime aired in 2016.

== Plot ==
On the continent Kunaaan, there are three kingdoms, Saint Amoria, Ishilfeen and Vanlodis, with a fragile power balance that could spell disaster and war at any moment. The evil dragon Daganzord also resides on the continent and no one is powerful enough to stop him from spreading destruction and charred land in his wake. Bairo, Kismitete, and a party of wizards attempted to seal Daganzord, but were foiled and this event was known as the Balbagoa Tragedy. Hiiro, Bairo and Kismitete's son, is saved by Giiru and swears to avenge his parents death by training himself with the sword. After turning sixteen Hiiro, with Giruu accompanying him, sets out on a journey to slay the dragon. Along the way, they meet many types of people and gain companions on their journey.

== Characters ==
Hiiro (ヒイロ, Hiiro)
Voiced by: Yoshitsugu Matsuoka
Son of Bairo and Kismitete, the two who sought years ago to seal Dagan Zot. Hiiro took part in the sealing ritual, but when the ritual failed Hiiro's father used a spell to switch his heart with Dagan Zot's, so that their lives would be bound to one another. Since then Hiiro has been training to become a swordsman and find and defeat Dagan Zot, unaware that Dagan Zot's death means his own, and his death means Dagan Zot's.
Saraato (サラート, Sarāto)
Voiced by: M.A.O
A mysterious girl who encounters Hiiro in the desert. Her exact nature is unknown, though she appears to have some knowledge of Dagan Zot and particularly likes the sound of Hiiro's (Dagan Zot's) heart. She has no external body temperature hence the ability to collect water on her skin from the desert air.
Erin (エリン, Erin)
Voiced by: Maaya Uchida
A cat-like information broker whose exact reason for following Hiiro is unknown.
Giruu (ギルー, Girū)
Voiced by: Taiten Kusunoki
A half-ogre who served Hiiro's parents before the ritual to seal Dagan Zot. After the ritual failed and Hiiro's parents were killed, Girū took care of Hiiro and trained him in swordsmanship.
Palpa (パルパ, Parupa)
Voiced by: Yōji Ueda
Tomitte (トミッテ, Tomitte)
Voiced by: Arisa Ogasawara
A young urchin who leads a gang of young thieves.
Nanbuuko (ナンブーコ, Nanbūko)
Voiced by: Shunsuke Sakuya
A weapons broker with immense power and influence across the kingdoms. He deliberately fans the flames of war and uses a mixture of swindling and simple coercion to convince his many clients to use any means necessary to pay his high prices, even if the cost is the entire wealth of the region and all the clients' subjects. He is a ruthless man who will never hesitate to take any opportunity to develop better merchandise, no matter how many lives are lost or doomed to torment in the process.
Sharisharu (シャリシャルー, Sharisharū)
Voiced by: Mariya Ise
A love crazy magic user, who would do anything for her love, Nanbuuko. Because of her love, she agreed to be experimented on, and combined with her pet.
Mumuu (ムムー, Mumū)
Voiced by: Manami Numakura
Mumuu is a rabbit like girl, who is easily influenced by money.
Bachroppa (バッハロッパ, Bahharoppa)
Voiced by: Masayuki Omoro

== Media ==
=== Game ===
Game producer GREE released the role-playing card battle game as a mobile game in 2011.

=== Manga ===
A manga adaptation by Seijirō Narumi, titled Seisen Cerberus: Mō Hitori no Eiyū (聖戦ケルベロス～もう一人の英雄～), was serialized in Kodansha's shōnen manga magazine Bessatsu Shōnen Magazine from 9 March to 9 October 2013. (Note: Finished in the magazine's November 2013 issue, released on 9 October of that same year.) Kodansha collected its chapters in two tankōbon volumes, released on 9 August and 9 December 2013.

| No. | Japanese release date | Japanese ISBN |
|---|---|---|
| 1 | 9 August 2013 | 978-4-06-394905-6 |
| 2 | 9 December 2013 | 978-4-06-394980-3 |

=== Anime ===
The game received an anime television adaptation to celebrate its fifth anniversary. The series is directed by Nobuhiro Kondo and written by Hiroshi Ōnogi, with animation by the studio Bridge. Character designs for the series are provided by Gō Tōgetsu, and Noboru Haraguchi served as the sound director at Tohokushinsha Film. Hideakira Kimura and Nobuaki Nobusawa provided the anime's music.

The opening theme song is "Resonant Heart" by Maaya Uchida, while the closing theme is "Xenotopia" by Suzuko Mimori.

The series premiered on 4 April 2016, and was broadcast on TV Tokyo, TV Osaka, TV Aichi, and AT-X. It was streamed on iQIYI, which co-produced the series. The series was simulcast by Crunchyroll under the title Cerberus.

| No. | Title | Original release date |
|---|---|---|
| 1 | "The Lord of the Dark Dragons"; Transliteration: "Rōdo Obu Dākudoragon" (Japanese: ロード・オブ・ダークドラゴン) | 4 April 2016 |
| 2 | "The Dark Crystal"; Transliteration: "Dāku Kurisutaru" (Japanese: ダーク・クリスタル) | 11 April 2016 |
| 3 | "The Hidden Fortress"; Transliteration: "Hidun fōtoresu" (Japanese: ヒドゥン・フォートレス) | 18 April 2016 |
| 4 | "An Expected Journey"; Transliteration: "Ekusupekuteddo jānī" (Japanese: エクスペクテッド・ジャーニー) | 25 April 2016 |
| 5 | "The Sense"; Transliteration: "Sensu" (Japanese: センス) | 2 May 2016 |
| 6 | "Strange Love"; Transliteration: "Sutorenji rabu" (Japanese: ストレンジ・ラブ) | 9 May 2016 |
| 7 | "Transform"; Transliteration: "Toransufōmu" (Japanese: トランスフォーム) | 16 May 2016 |
| 8 | "The Dark Shadow"; Transliteration: "Dāku shadō" (Japanese: ダーク・シャドウ) | 23 May 2016 |
| 9 | "Signs"; Transliteration: "Sain" (Japanese: サイン) | 30 May 2016 |
| 10 | "The Omen"; Transliteration: "Ji ōmen" (Japanese: ジ・オーメン) | 6 June 2016 |
| 11 | "Fury Road"; Transliteration: "Fyūrī rōdo" (Japanese: フューリー・ロード) | 13 June 2016 |
| 12 | "Return of the Dark Dragon"; Transliteration: "Ritān Obu dākudoragon" (Japanese: リターン・オブ・ダークドラゴン) | 20 June 2016 |
| 13 | "Dragon's Heart"; Transliteration: "Doragon hāto" (Japanese: ドラゴン・ハート) | 27 June 2016 |
