= Heartbeat City/Itsuka Kumo ga Haretanara =

Single by Maaya Uchida

from the album HIKARI
- A-side: "Heartbeat City; Itsuka Kumo ga Haretanara"
- Released: November 25, 2020
- Genre: J-POP
- Length: 4:17 (#1); 4:52 (#2)
- Label: Pony Canyon
- Songwriters: Taku Inoue kz(livetune)
- Producer: Akihiro Tomita

Maaya Uchida singles chronology
| "No Scenario" (2020) | "Heartbeat City/Itsuka Kumo ga Haretanara" (2020) | "Strobe Memory" (2021) |

Music video
- Maaya Uchida "Heartbeat City/Itsuka Kumo ga Haretanara" Music Video on YouTube

"Heartbeat City/Itsuka Kumo ga Haretanara" (ハートビートシティ/いつか雲が晴れたなら, lit. Someday When the Clouds Clear) is Japanese voice actress and singer Maaya Uchida's 11th single, released on November 25, 2020.

== Track listings ==
CD
| No. | Title | Lyrics | Music | Arrangement | Length |
|---|---|---|---|---|---|
| 1. | "Heartbeat City" (ハートビートシティ) | Taku Inoue | Taku Inoue | kz(livetune) | 4:17 |
| 2. | "Itsuka Kumo ga Haretanara" (いつか雲が晴れたなら) | kz(livetune) | kz(livetune) | Taku Inoue | 4:52 |
| 3. | "Heartbeat City" (Instrumental) | | | | 4:17 |
| 4. | "Itsuka Kumo ga Haretanara" (Instrumental) | | | | 4:52 |
| Total length: | | | | | 18:18 |

DVD (Limited Edition only)
| No. | Title | Length |
|---|---|---|
| 1. | "Heartbeat City/Itsuka Kumo ga Haretanara" (MUSIC VIDEO) |
| 2. | "Heartbeat City" (OFF SHOT) |
| 3. | "Itsuka Kumo ga Haretanara" (OFF SHOT) |
| 4. | "Heartbeat City/Itsuka Kumo ga Haretanara" (MAKING) |

== Charts ==
| Chart (2020) | Peak position |
|---|---|
| Oricon Weekly Singles Chart | 14 |
| Billboard JAPAN Top Singles Sales | 15 |

== Event ==
- 『 Maaya Party！11』 Maaya Uchida 11th Single Release Event「Maaya Party！11」（December 19, 2020 - December 26, 2020：Online）

== Album ==
| Song | Album | Release date | Note |
|---|---|---|---|
| Heartbeat City | 『HIKARI』 | October 27, 2021 | 3rd Album |
| Itsuka Kumo ga Haretanara | 『HIKARI』 | October 27, 2021 | 3rd Album |
