= You Are Here (Maaya Uchida album) =

EP by Maaya Uchida
- Released: October 2, 2019
- Genre: Jpop
- Length: 26:19
- Label: Pony Canyon
- Producer: Akihiro Tomita

Maaya Uchida chronology
Magic Hour (2018)	You Are Here (2019)	HIKARI (2021)

Music video
- "Maaya Uchida "Seasons Come, Seasons Go" Music Video short ver." on YouTube

You Are Here is Japanese voice actress and singer Maaya Uchida's second mini album, released on October 2, 2019.

== Track listings ==
CD
No.	Title	Lyrics	Music	Arrangement	Length
1.	"Naminori Carry On" (波乗りキャリーオン)	TAKE (FLOW)	TAKE (FLOW)	TAKE (FLOW)	3:50
2.	"Kyomei Raison D'etre" (共鳴レゾンデートル)	Tomoya Tabuchi	Tomoya Tabuchi	Shouta Horie	4:20
3.	"Girl is fun"	y0c1e	y0c1e	y0c1e	3:47
4.	"Kimi Iki Express" (キミ行きEXPRESS)	Meeko Yamamoto	Yosuke Yamamoto	Yashikin	4:56
5.	"Anohito ni Aitai" (あの人に会いたい)	Keiichi Sokabe	Keiichi Sokabe	Keiichi Sokabe	4:06
6.	"Seasons Come, Seasons Go"	Jun Maeda	Jun Maeda	y0c1e	5:20
Total length:					26:19

BD・DVD
No.	Title	Length
1.	"Seasons Come, Seasons Go" (MUSIC VIDEO)
2.	"Seasons Come, Seasons Go" (OFF SHOT)
3.	"Seasons Come, Seasons Go" (MAKING)

== Charts ==
Chart (2019)	Peak position
Oricon Weekly Albums Chart	9
Billboard JAPAN Hot Albums	10
Billboard JAPAN Top Albums Sales	7
