= Ace of Diamond Act II season 2 =

Anime series

Ace of Diamond Act II
- Season 2

Release
- Original network: TX Network
- Original release: 5 April 2026

Series chronology
- ← Previous; Ace of Diamond Act II Next → N/A

Ace of Diamond is an anime series based on the manga by Yuji Terajima serialized in Weekly Shōnen Magazine. In May 2024, it was announced that the sequel series would receive a second season. It premiered on 5 April 2026 on TV Tokyo and its affiliates.

Currently, the second season has one opening and one ending themes. The opening theme is "Let's Go Crazy" by Baby Canta while the ending theme is "Number" by SUPER★DRAGON.

== Episodes ==
| No. overall | No. in season | Title | Original air date |
|---|---|---|---|
| 179 | 1 | "To What Lies Ahead"; Transliteration: "Sono saki e" (Japanese: その先へ) | April 5, 2026 |
"More important than the future where we might mess up—what matters is this moment, where we might mess up! I'm going to let them hit hard, so I'm counting on everyone in the field!" The fifth round of the All-Japan High School Baseball Championship to decide the West Tokyo representative: Seidou vs. Norikane. Starting pitcher is Sawamura Eijun, who will be wearing the ace number from this summer. This is his last summer playing on a team with the third-year students like Miyuki. Play ball!
| 180 | 2 | "For The Team"; Transliteration: "Chīmu no tame ni" (Japanese: チームの為に) | April 12, 2026 |
Under a clear blue sky, the battle between Ichidai Sankou and Yakushi High School began. Yakushi's starting pitcher was freshman Tomobe, with Sanada batting third and playing left field. Sankou's starting pitcher was ace Amahisa. Can Yakushi's slugger, Todoroki Raichi, overcome the genius Amahisa? Raichi's bat will be the key to the game!
| 181 | 3 | "The Path of the Victor"; Transliteration: "Shōsha no michi" (Japanese: 勝者の道) | April 19, 2026 |
Ichidai Sankou vs. Yakushi High School. In the bottom of the third inning, Yakushi's ace, Sanada, took the mound. Ichidai Sankou had succeeded in forcing their ace out early in the game. At the end of the seventh inning, Ichidai Sankou led 2-0. Amahisa was playing smoothly. However, there was no way Raichi would give up here!
| 182 | 4 | "Roar!"; Transliteration: "Gōon" (Japanese: 轟音) | April 26, 2026 |
The matches to determine the top four teams are beginning one after another. Seikou vs. Inashiro Industrial. Narumiya, reigning like a king on the Inashiro mound, delivers an overwhelming pitching performance. And Seido's next opponent is Sosei High School. Furuya takes the mound as the starting pitcher. How will his start go...?
| 183 | 5 | "Something Off"; Transliteration: "Iwakan" (Japanese: 違和感) | May 3, 2026 |
Sawamura, scheduled to start against Seido's next opponent, Ichidai Sankou, was practicing his pitching motion and new pitches with Okumura. He mentioned that he had several grips he wanted to try to increase his repertoire of pitches (numbers). Meanwhile, Kawakami was experiencing a strange sensation in his right arm…
| 184 | 6 | "The Unveiling"; Transliteration: "Ohirome" (Japanese: お披露目) | May 10, 2026 |
The game between Seido and Ichidai Sankou begins. Sawamura takes a deep breath and steps up to the mound. "I'm going to strike them out as much as I can, so I'm counting on everyone in the field!" The pitching duel between Sawamura and Amahisa, with a spot in the finals on the line, has begun.
| 185 | 7 | "What's Built Up"; Transliteration: "Tsumiagete kita mono" (Japanese: 積み上げてきたもの) | May 17, 2026 |
In the top of the second inning, Ichidai Sankou had a chance to score the first run. With no outs and a runner on second base, the batter up to bat was number 5, Sasaki. Both teams wanted to score first, so how would Sankou's offense fare? Could the battery of Sawamura and Miyuki hold them off?!
| 186 | 8 | "The Mentality of the Ace"; Transliteration: "Ēsu no rinen" (Japanese: エースの理念) | May 24, 2026 |
The game remained a close contest with both teams scoreless. In the top of the fourth inning, as Sankou's offense began, Sawamura pitched smoothly, and a runner advanced to second base on an error by first baseman Maezono. The batter up to bat was, once again, cleanup hitter Hoshida. Sankou had another chance to score the first run.
| 187 | 9 | "High Voltage" | May 31, 2026 |
Seido conceded the first run. In the bottom of the fourth inning, Seido wanted to tie the game, and with runners on first and second base, their slugger Miyuki stepped up to the plate. Amahisa, who had been in good form up to this point, threw a powerful cutter ball. Miyuki's bat connected with the ball, but...
| 188 | 10 | "My Fight"; Transliteration: "Ore no tatakai" (Japanese: 俺の戦い) | June 7, 2026 |
Sawamura and Amahisa engage in a pitching duel with neither giving an inch. In the bottom of the seventh inning, Seidou has a chance to counterattack with no outs and a runner on first base. Toujou steps up to the plate, aiming for a safety bunt. The next batter is Yuuki Masashi, whose strong point is his powerful full swing, unusual for a first-year student!
| 189 | 11 | "As a Partner"; Transliteration: "Aibō to Shite" (Japanese: 相棒として) | June 14, 2026 |
| 190 | 12 | "The Next Stage"; Transliteration: "Tsugi no Sutēji" (Japanese: 次のステージ) | June 21, 2026 |
| 191 | 13 | "The Road is Endless"; Transliteration: "Michi Hateshinaku" (Japanese: 道果てしなく) | June 28, 2026 |
