= Ace of Diamond Act II =

Anime series

- No. of episodes: 52

Release
- Original network: TX Network
- Original release: 2 April 2019 – 31 March 2020

Series chronology
- ← Previous; Ace of Diamond season 2 Next → Ace of Diamond Act II season 2

Ace of Diamond is an anime series based on the manga by Yuji Terajima serialized in Weekly Shōnen Magazine. An anime adaptation of Ace of Diamond Act II has been announced, and it premiered on April 2, 2019. The series is listed for 52 episodes.

Six pieces of theme music are used for the episodes: two opening and four ending themes. From episodes 127–155, the opening theme is "Hajimari no Uta (はじまりのうた)" by GLAY while the ending themes are "Golden After School (ゴールデンアフタースクール)" by OxT and "Kodō Escalation (鼓動エスカレーション)" by Maaya Uchida. From episode 156 onwards, the second opening theme is "Ryūsei no Howl (流星のHOWL)" by GLAY while the ending themes are "Chance! (チャンス！)" by Suzuko Mimori and "Everlasting Dream" by OxT.

== Episodes ==
No. overall	No. in season	Title	Original air date
127	1	"Beyond the Dream"; Transliteration: "Yume no Saki" (Japanese: 夢の先)	April 2, 2019
The first day of the Spring Koshien has come! Making his debut in the nationals, Sawamura is determined to show off what he had achieved, only to fail dramatically. Meanwhile, Hongou Masamune of Komadai Fujimaki takes the stadium to storm.
128	2	"Wanna Take The Mound"; Transliteration: "Hayaku Tachitai" (Japanese: 早く立ちたい)	April 9, 2019
Seidō High School plays against Nihon Shōno for the second round of Senbatsu. Seidō wins and advances to the quarterfinals. The remaining seven schools to compete for the quarterfinals are also decided. A few of the teams are Yakushi High School, which appears in nationals for the first time and comes from West Tokyo like Seidō; Hakuryū High School, famous for their team's mobility; and the current national champion, Komadai Fujimaki High School.
129	3	"Blessed by the Baseball Gods"; Transliteration: "Yakyū no Moshigo" (Japanese: 野球の申し子)	April 16, 2019
The quarterfinals match between Komadai Fujimaki High School and Seidō High School starts. Both teams start with their respective aces, Hongō Masamune and Furuya Satoru, who both have attracted the media's attention for their blazing fast pitches.
130	4	"The Day It Began"; Transliteration: "Hajimari no Hi" (Japanese: はじまりの日)	April 23, 2019
The quarterfinals match between Komadai Fujimaki High School and Seidō High School enters the final stage. Seidō's batting line up has only gotten one hit so far, courtesy of Miyuki. As if in response to Hongō's pitching, Furuya reaches a higher level of pitching.
131	5	"Joining"; Transliteration: "Gōryū" (Japanese: 合流)	April 30, 2019
With their defeat against Komadai Fujimaki High School, Seidō High School's Senbatsu is over. Now back in Tokyo, the team members reflect on each of their performances. Meanwhile, new first year members are welcomed into the team.
132	6	"Go Straight"	May 7, 2019
A new tournament season begins and Seidō High School, having rested enough being a seeded team, plays in the third round against Eigen High. Spectators fill the stadium with hopes of witnessing Furuya pitch after making a name at Senbatsu. Kawakami is the starting pitcher before switching with Sawamura.
133	7	"KING"	May 14, 2019
Spectators fill the Jingu Second Stadium to capacity to witness Senbatsu semi-finalist Yakushi High School and Summer Koshien runner-up Inashiro Industrial face off against each other. The match starts with a stalemate until Inashiro shows again their strength.
134	8	"Camphor"; Transliteration: "Kanfuru-zai" (Japanese: カンフル剤)	May 21, 2019
The match between Inashiro and Yakushi concludes. Meanwhile, at Seidō, the first years struggle to keep up with the level of high school baseball. Two spots of the first string are currently open. The third years who face their last summer in the team, the second years, and the first years alike vie for the two open spots.
135	9	"Battle, Battle"; Transliteration: "Batoru×Batoru" (Japanese: バトル×バトル)	May 28, 2019
As the Tokyo Spring tournament continues, Furuya's ball control is starting to become noticeably inconsistent. First years Masashi Yuki and Kaoru Yui take the numbers #19 and #20, filling in the last two spots on the first string team. The episode also highlights the tenacity of non-chosen second years like Hiroomi, power-hungry and craving a spot on the first string. Meanwhile, Sawamura tries helping his first year roommate Asada to settle into the dorm life and clashes with Okumura in the process.
136	10	"Debut"; Transliteration: "Uijin" (Japanese: 初陣)	June 4, 2019
Teito defeats Ugumori and advances in the Spring Tournament. Sawamura complains about the hard to deal with Okumura and gets reminded by Miyuki of his own skirmishes during his first year(challenging Asuma and angering Miyuki by complaining about Chris) and his tendency to rub people the wrong way. Miyuki advises Sawamura to leave Okumura to him and should rather focus on pitching for the game against east Tokyo's powerhouse Kasuga First. Hints of Sawamura's 'Numbers' and along with Yuki (the younger brother) makes a debut in the game.
137	11	"Where You Look"; Transliteration: "Shisen no Saki" (Japanese: 複線の先)	June 11, 2019
With Yuki's homerun Seido ended with 8-0 and advances to the Semifinals. Ichidai Third along with Inashiro Industrial and Teito High will also be competing in the semifinals, the best two teams from the finals will be able to compete in the Kanto Tournament.
138	12	"Selfish"; Transliteration: "Wagamama" (Japanese: ワガママ)	June 18, 2019
Back at the dorms, tensions are rising between Sawamura and Furuya with their first year catchers Yui and Okumura. Miyuki advises lone wolf Okumura to reflect on his behaviour as a catcher and it's their job to make the pitches throw their best, regardless if Okumura is playing in the game or not. After being told by Miyuki that his conflict with Sawamura could affect his pitching performance and the team, Okumura begins to reflect on his actions. Uneasy with Furuya's mental state, Miyuki agrees to Furuya's request for pitching practice before Sawamura (despite Sawamura asking him first). He finds out Furuya's feels responsible for losing at Koshien Stadium and passionately wants to improve his pitching even further, choosing to walk that thorny path. While watching the practice Sawamura complains he's not being prioritized by Miyuki because he isn't the ace, to his surprise, Okumura offers to catch for him instead. Possibly as a gesture to make amends, Sawamura accepts the offer and pitches to Okumura.
139	13	"Batting First"; Transliteration: "Senkō" (Japanese: 先攻)	June 25, 2019
Sawamura practices with Okumura and showcases his iconic 'Numbers'. It is revealed that depending on his grip, Sawamura is able to throw various types of pitches. Throughout all the grips Miyuki and Sawamura tested during off-season, they labelled numbers to the grips that were consisted enough. Sawamura pitches number 7: cut ball kai and shocks the first years. (Although he doesn't pitch all the grips, presumably, Sawamura is able to pitch seven different grips).
140	14	"Presence"; Transliteration: "Kehai" (Japanese: 気配)	July 2, 2019
Seido vs Ichidai Third. Seido decides to face Amahisa head-on by batting first. However, playing as the ace, Furuya's inconsistent ball control is rearing its head. Paralleling Narumiya's state last fall, Furuya is self-aware that he's bearing the weight of the burden as 'Ace'. Will Furuya overcome the hurdles or be crushed under the pressure?
141	15	"My Role"; Transliteration: "Jibun no Yakuwari" (Japanese: 自分の役割)	July 9, 2019
After performing poorly and allowing too many runs, Furuya is subbed out for Sawamura. Sawamura overwhelms the stadium with his confidence and fiery pitches as the pinch pitcher, proving himself as a reliable presence for the team. Coach Kataoka apologizes and thanks Sawamura for saving the game. To which he brushes off saying the game isn't over.
142	16	"Only After You've Won"; Transliteration: "Katte koso" (Japanese: 勝ってこそ)	July 16, 2019
Enraged at the fact Kataoka apologized to him. Sawamura is frustrated over the fact Furuya was able to stay for so many innings despite performing poorly. He understood should the same occur to him, he'd be immediately subbed out because he's not the Ace. A fire is lit in Sawamura when taking his turn to bat, surprisingly he hits the ball and reaches the second base. As the game progressed, Ichidai Third's Ace Amahisa proved too strong for Seido's batters and ends the game 5-3. Afterwards Amahisa approaches Sawamura, intrigued by his cutball kai pitch, to the point of talking casually and asking for his LINE. To which is rare, as Amahisa doesn't usually take interest in another team's pitcher, according to Ichidai Third players.
143	17	"Three Months"; Transliteration: "3-Kagetsu" (Japanese: 3か月)	July 23, 2019
Inashiro Industrial and Teito High clashes in a battle between Aces. Narumiya uses all his best pitches to ultimately shuts out Teito Highschool. As a result from the loss, Sawamura becomes more motivated to prove his pitches in order to become Seido's Ace. Ochiai points out Kataoka's reluctancy to sub out Furuya costed the game. He acknowledges despite Sawamura's strong defence, it is futile to win games unless the Seido's batters, the only form of offence must improve in order to do so. Miyuki reflects to himself on Sawamura's growth, admitting Sawamura's performance today befits him wearing the Ace number. Gazing at the sunset bittersweetly, Miyuki affirms he's left with only three months to play baseball with Sawamura and Furuya.
144	18	"Something to Find Out"; Transliteration: "Tashikameitai mono" (Japanese: 確かめたいもの)	July 30, 2019
Kataoka discards jersey numbers to assemble a fresh new first string team, stating whoever proves themselves in their performance during the next three months will be chosen. Sawamura takes initiative and wants to understand Miyuki's game calling and pitching sequence. Inashiro Industrial wins the Spring Tournament after Ichidai Third couldn't sub in Amahisa. Okumura tells Sawamura he's not worthy of catching his pitches and promises to do so after becoming a first string member.
145	19	"Competitive Streak"; Transliteration: "Tatakau Shisei" (Japanese: 戦う姿勢)	August 6, 2019
Kataoka calls for an Intrasquad game as an opportunity for the other members perform and be picked for either the First String or Second String team. Deciding to pit the first years against the remaining second and third years. Kukki and Asada pitches for the first years.
146	20	"Self-Assertive"; Transliteration: "Jikoshuchō" (Japanese: 自己主張)	August 13, 2019
Okumura and Takuma outplays the second and third years while batting by working together and using Daikyo Senior's 'thinking baseball' strategies. Which was taught by their coach that shortly left the team for stronger teams. The 'thinking baseball' strategies as Okumura describes, comes naturally to him as his coach's words constantly haunts him and is deeply rooted in his body. Yui and Yuki also appealed to Kataoka and requests to join the first years playing against the second/third years.
147	21	"Out of Time"; Transliteration: "Jikanganai" (Japanese: 時間がない)	August 20, 2019
Three schools from Western Tokyo will be playing in the Kanto Tournament, Inashiro, Ichidai and Yakushi. We also find out Mimura, Kawashima and Takatsu join Seido's first string. While Kukki, Kagami, Seto and Okumura make second string. The anxiety of getting a spot on the first string grows, as the third years are feeling intimidated by some of the prodigeous first years. Kanemaru upsets Takatsu as a result of miscommunication, coming across as talking down to him rather than congratulating him. Comically, the second years receive Kataoka as their Modern Japanese teacher (as he originally is a teacher). Sawamura notes he'll be dead if he falls asleep in this class.Yui joins Miyuki's cram school amongst the catchers and pitchers. Miyuki also encourages Sawamura and Furuya to practice with the first year catchers in order to build relationship and knowledge. He also expresses he'll help the two as best as he can. Miyuki offers to help with their pitches any time they ask.
148	22	"Designated"; Transliteration: "Shimei" (Japanese: 指名)	August 27, 2019
Okumura declines Sawamura's request to pitch for him as he wants to uphold the pledge, that he'll earn the right to catch his pitch only and only when he's on the first string. While accepting Furuya's request out of curiosity and wants to see the second year ace's pitches up close. Okumura's ability as a catcher shines in the bullpen, as Furuya also notes he feels comfortable with his catching. While waiting for Miyuki to help him practice, Sawamura for once feels bad for interrupting his batting practice. Reasoning he rarely sees Miyuki practice so hard. Miyuki encourages Sawamura, explaining that he too wants to go all out in the Golden Week games. The 'numbers' practice between Miyuki and Sawamura are overseen by Kataoka, learning that pitches after Number 7 lack control. It is after this, Kataoka decides on Sawamura as the starter for the practice game against Senbatsu's Hakuryu in 3 days. The strongest team out of all the practice games.
149	23	"One Pitch, One Second"; Transliteration: "Ichi-kyū Ichi-byō" (Japanese: 一球一秒)	September 3, 2019
It is now the Golden week and the high school teams throughout the nation participates in practice games against powerhouse schools. In order to prepare themselves for the upcoming Summer Tournament. Furuya's ball control is still erratic and the teaching staff are worried whether or not, Furuya will overcome this in time. At the end of the episode we are introduced to Hakuryu, a team known for their calculative tactics and fast runners.
150	24	"Incomplete"; Transliteration: "Mikansei" (Japanese: 未完成)	September 10, 2019
Seidou starts off their game against Hakuryu with Sawamura as their starting pitcher. In the early innings, Hakuryu's quick baserunning pressures Seidou's defense, but Seidou's batters put up just as much pressure against Hakuryu's defense. On top of the third, Sawamura and Miyuki's cooperation makes it difficult for Hakyuru to score any runs, even when Mima is up to bat.
151	25	"Unleashed"; Transliteration: "Kaikin" (Japanese: 解禁)	September 17, 2019
Seidou holds out against Hakuryu well, with neither team being able to gain a sizeable lead. Sawamura's pitching makes it difficult for Hakuryu's batters to get on base, rendering their quick baserunning useless. In the middle innings, Hakuryu changes up their batting strategy in an attempt to trip up Sawamura's pitching, and Sawamura is forced to walk Mima. However, Sawamura remains calm and continues to pitch strikes.
152	26	"Beneath the Same Banner"; Transliteration: "Onaji Hata no Shita" (Japanese: 同じ旗の下)	September 24, 2019
In Seido's second string practice game against Ichidai Sakurai, Okumura has shown himself to be a competent catcher. Meanwhile, in the Seido vs Hakuryu game, Seido manages to score 2 runs in the 6th inning after changing up their batting strategy, while Hakuryu struggles to score even one run. Seido ultimately wins the match against Hakuryu. Even after pitching all 9 innings and holding Hakuryu to just 1 run, Sawamura still isn't satisfied with his performance. Seido goes on to win all of their golden week practice games.
153	27	"The Note"	October 1, 2019
Seido's first string returns from the golden week practice games. Due to Sawamura's outstanding performance in the Hakuryu match, an article about him was published, making his presence known. Coach Kataoka hands out baseball journals with some comments about the practice games written in them. Sawamura's comments from the coach serve to motivate him to work harder, while Furuya's compels him to do some self-reflection. The team practices fielding with the coach.
154	28	"I'm Not Stopping"; Transliteration: "Toman'ne~ekara na" (Japanese: 止まんねぇからな)	October 8, 2019
Seidou continues to practice for the upcoming Summer Tournament. Furuya is determined to overcome his weaknesses, but discovers that he has an injury.
155	29	"After Spring Comes"; Transliteration: "Haru, Soshite―" (Japanese: 春、そして―)	October 15, 2019
Flashback episode that looks back on all the previous episodes this season.
156	30	"Bloom of Youth"	October 22, 2019
Seidou has practice games against Naruta Industrial and Asari High school. Furuya is put on a special training regimen until his injury heals.
157	31	"Kind of Like a Promise"; Transliteration: "Chikai no Yōna mono" (Japanese: 誓いのようなもの)	October 29, 2019
The Seidou team continues to practice in preparation for the Summer Tournament. During pitching practice, Okumura still refuses to catch for Sawamura until he is on the first string, even when he is ordered to by coach Kataoka. Furuya practices fielding since he is still not well enough to pitch yet.
158	32	"Hunger"; Transliteration: "Katsubō" (Japanese: 渇望)	November 5, 2019
Furuya prepares for his comeback as a pitcher for the second-string. Meanwhile, Inashiro Industrial wins the Kantou Tournament, defeating Hakuryū High School, 5-3.
159	33	"Heat Transfer"; Transliteration: "Den'netsu" (Japanese: 伝熱)	November 12, 2019
Seidou continues to play practice games with different schools in preparation for the Summer Tournament. Furuya pitches in a second-string game for the first time in weeks since the discovery of his injury, with Okumura catching for him. Later, Okumura is finally placed in the first string after a discussion between Miyuki, the coaches, and Rei.
160	34	"Competition"; Transliteration: "Kyōen" (Japanese: 競演)	November 19, 2019
Sawamura and Furuya send off Miyuki, who is going to Inashiro to practice with the other high schoolers chosen to form the team that will be taking on the American team. Miyuki is not really needed as a catcher, so he plays first baseman instead, and catches for Shunshin in the bullpen for practice. Back at Seidou, Okumura catches for Sawamura, and struggles to stay grounded in the first string.
161	35	"Because He's Awesome"; Transliteration: "Sugē Yatsudakara" (Japanese: スゲー奴だから)	November 26, 2019
While the Tokyo high school team was playing against a university team for practice, the American team finally arrive to Inashiro. The awaited game between the Japanese team and the American team begin, with Shunshin starting on the mound.
162	36	"As a Catcher"; Transliteration: "Hoshi to shite" (Japanese: 捕手として)	December 3, 2019
At Inashiro, the American team sends out a new pitcher who is highly skilled. The Japanese team takes this opportunity to send out Narumiya in response. At Seidou, Furuya pitches in a practice game against a team that frequents Koshien, with Ono as his battery partner since Miyuki is still at Inashiro.
163	37	"Invincible Mentality"; Transliteration: "Jōshō Shikō" (Japanese: 常勝思考)	December 10, 2019
Ono is injured by one of Furuya's pitches, and he is switched out with Yui. The main catcher on the Japanese team also gets injured, so Miyuki is sent in as a replacement catcher, even though doing so will allow him to see Narumiya's pitching from up close.
164	38	"Fragile"; Transliteration: "Furajairu" (Japanese: フラジャイル)	December 17, 2019
The games at Inashiro as well as Seidou continue. Furuya struggles to pitch well in the practice game after the switch in catchers.
165	39	"I'm Counting on You"; Transliteration: "Tanonda zo" (Japanese: 頼んだぞ)	December 24, 2019
Furuya and Yui are switched out for Okumura and Kaneda, but Seidou still ends up losing the practice game, cutting their winning streak short. In the next practice game, Okumura and Sawamura form a battery.
166	40	"Expression"; Transliteration: "Tsuragamae" (Japanese: 面構え)	January 7, 2020
Okumura and Sawamura continue working together as a battery to win their practice game.
167	41	"Shared Fate"; Transliteration: "Unmei Kyōdōtai" (Japanese: 運命共同体)	January 14, 2020
Yuuki hits a home run, and Seidou finishes off their practice game with a win. At Inashiro, two games were played, the first was a tie, and the second was won by the American team.
168	42	"20 People"; Transliteration: "20-ri" (Japanese: 20人)	January 21, 2020
On the train home after the Tokyo Invitational game, Miyuki meets Narumiya and gives him some honest advice. They promise an intense battle in the summer tournament. Meanwhile, the fierce game against Seiho on Seido's practice field has come to an end. The Seido nine reflect on their challenges to address, including those from their loss to Yamamori Academy. It's now time to decide the twenty players who will make the roster for the summer tournament.
169	43	"Summer Training Camp"; Transliteration: "Natsu Gasshuku" (Japanese: 夏合宿)	January 28, 2020
The Seido baseball team is holding their summer training camp. The managers are working hard to prepare onigiri for them to eat. Sawamura is trying to eat natto, his least favorite food, in order to gain the stamina to pitch for nine innings without getting tired. The players are keenly interested in who will perform well in the training camp and earn a numbered jersey for the summer tournament. Will Sawamura, Furuya or Kawakami earn the right to wear the ace number?
170	44	"Setting Sail"; Transliteration: "Kōshin" (Japanese: 航進)	February 4, 2020
It's the final day of the summer training camp. The batters of the Seido nine are doing all they can to prepare to face top-tier pitchers like Narumiya and Amahisa. That evening, Coach Kataoka starts fielding drills that work the players to the bone. The next day is the drawing to decide which block each school will play in for the summer tournament. What teams will Seido High School be up against?
171	45	"Go EXCEED!!"	February 11, 2020
Showing the sum total of his pre-tournament training, Sawamura pitches impressively against powerhouse school Kokonoe, holding them to two runs in eight innings. Meanwhile, Ochiai still holds esteem for Furuya who wore the ace number and still continues to improve. Will Seido's ace for this summer be Sawamura, or Furuya? What will Kataoka decide?
172	46	"Encouragement"; Transliteration: "Gekirei" (Japanese: 激励)	February 18, 2020
Seido awaits their first game of the summer tournament. Sawamura wants to get used to wearing the ace number and so begins to sleep in his uniform, earning him a teasing from his roommates. Coach Kataoka receives an stimulating call from his former mentor Coach Sasaki, the coach of Yura Sogo Engineering High School who they are about to face. Yura Sogo competes in the first round anticipating their game against the seeded Seido. What does the cunning Coach Sasaki have up his sleeve?
173	47	"Under the Feet"; Transliteration: "Ashimoto" (Japanese: 足元)	February 25, 2020
Seidou watches the record of Inashiro's match in the evening. Ichidaisan, Seiko and Yakushi also won their opening matches handily. At night the players try to get their premature adrenaline in check. The next day the match Yura vs Seidou starts. Right at the beginning Sawamura makes a fielding error and is affected by it which enables Yura to score. Seidou gets out of the 1st inning with two lost runs.
174	48	"Get Back"	March 3, 2020
In the bottom of the 1st inning Kuramochi scores Seidou's 1st run with the help of Haruichi. The first inning ends with 2 runs for Yura and 1 run for Seidou. Coach Kataoka explains that this is the result of the opponent going all out. They should switch gears and move on. He tells Sawamura that he is counting on him. In the 2nd and 3rd inning neither Seidou nor Yura scores a run. At the top of the 4th inning after throwing 4 balls Seidou is switching pitchers.
175	49	"Seido Goes All Out"; Transliteration: "Honki no Seidō" (Japanese: 本気の青道)	March 10, 2020
Kawakami takes over and tells Sawamura that his feelings reached everyone and asks him to let them handle the rest. The 3rd year battery then shows a perfect relief, preventing Yura from grabbing the momentum. At bottom of the 4th inning, Miyuki manages to hit a homerun and thus equals the score. With Zono Seidou takes the lead and with Toujou they score their 3rd run in the same inning. Kawakami holds Yura off until the 6th inning without losing any runs. Masashi slams a 2 run home run in the 7th inning and it's a called game. Seidou wins and moves to watch Hachiya Ouji's game.
176	50	"FIRE AGE"	March 17, 2020
Seido has defeated Yura Sogo in a called game. Reflecting on their inability to establish a rhythm in the early innings, Seido begins to analyze and strategize against their next opponent, Hachiya Oji. Of particular interest is their captain, second baseman Kawabata. Kuramochi and Haruichi are fired up to face their rival fielder. Meanwhile, Kataoka calls Sawamura to his office after the coach's meeting and tells him to make the most of his experience from the first game.
177	51	"That's The Reason Why"; Transliteration: "Sorede koso" (Japanese: それでこそ)	March 24, 2020
It's Seidou's match against Hachiya Ouji. Furuya's control isn't perfect but he doesn't miss the mark that much nevertheless. He even sets a personal speed record with 155 km/h with one of his pitches, getting his 10th strikeout during the 5th inning. Sawamura looks happy to see a revived Furuya. At the bottom of the 5th inning, Seidou's batters show their worth and score 5 runs. Till the 7th inning, they widen the gap 0-8.
178	52	"Ace of Diamond"; Transliteration: "Daiya no Ēsu" (Japanese: ダイヤのA(エース))	March 31, 2020
It's the top of the seventh inning in Seido's game against Hachiya Oji. Hachiya Oji has to score this inning or else the game will be called. Kawabata fought his way to a base, but it would be Hachiya Oji's last offensive. Seido's victory is imminent. After hearing Furuya say he'd get to play the next game, Sawamura watches the game from the bench, the number one on his back. The story of these two players vying for the title of the ace will continue.
