= Ace of Diamond season 2 =

Season of anime series

Ace of Diamond
- Season 2
- No. of episodes: 51

Release
- Original network: TX Network
- Original release: 6 April 2015 – 28 March 2016

Series chronology
- ← Previous; Season 1 Next → Ace of Diamond Act II

Ace of Diamond is an anime series based on the manga by Yuji Terajima serialized in Weekly Shōnen Magazine. The second season started airing soon after on April 6, 2015, on TX Network stations and later on AT-X. Like its predecessor, the episodes were simulcast in the aforementioned countries by Crunchyroll with English and German subtitles.

Six pieces of theme musics are used for the episodes: two opening and four ending themes. From episodes 76–88, the opening theme is "HEROES" by GLAY, while the ending themes are "KIMERO!!" by OxT and "BLUE WINDING ROAD" by Ryōta Ōsaka, Nobunaga Shimazaki, Natsuki Hanae, Shouta Aoi and Yoshitsugu Matsuoka. From episodes 89–126, the opening theme is "Sora ga Aozora de Aru Tame ni" (空が青空であるために, lit. 'For The Sky Is Blue') by GLAY, while the ending themes are "BLOOM OF YOUTH" by OxT and "BRAND NEW BLUE" by Ryōta Ōsaka featuring Masayoshi Ōishi of OxT.

== Episodes ==
No. overall	No. in season	Title	Original air date
76	1	"Howling In The Summer"; Transliteration: "Manatsu no Houkou" (Japanese: 真夏の咆哮)	April 6, 2015
With the upcoming Fall Tournament approaching, Monthly Baseball Kingdom recaps the Summer Tournament trying to figure out whom the dark horses will be. The recap begins with the Seido vs Yakushi game.
77	2	"The Summer Heat Haze"; Transliteration: "Manatsu no Kagerou" (Japanese: 真夏の陽炎)	April 13, 2015
Monthly Baseball Kingdom continues their recap of the Summer Tournament by reviewing the Tokyo West regional championship game between Seido vs Inashiro. The recap covers until Eijun Sawamura heads to the mound.
78	3	"The Kings of Summer"; Transliteration: "Manatsu no Ouja" (Japanese: 真夏の王者)	April 20, 2015
Monthly Baseball Kingdom finishes their recap of the Summer Tournament by finishing the review on the Seido vs Inashiro regional championship game. The recap covers all of Eijun's pitches right up until Inashiro gets the game-winning hit off of Norifumi Kawakami.
79	4	"The Fall Tournament Begins!"; Transliteration: "Iza, Aki Tai!" (Japanese: いざ, 秋大!)	April 27, 2015
Seido ends up in the fall's most competitive bracket. In order to have any chance to advance, they will have to overcome regular national tournament participant Teito, a school that has advanced to nationals 27 times and won in twice. As if that weren't enough, Teito has an unrivaled first year pitcher who can see the strike zone three dimensionally. Coach Kataoka comes up with a strategy that could give Seido the ability to advance if they can pull it off, and he delivers a few words to Sawamura when Sawamura asks if he can switch to being a sidearm pitcher.
80	5	"The Cold Rain"; Transliteration: "Tsumetai Ame" (Japanese: 冷たい雨)	May 4, 2015
Seido and Teito begin playing in the rain. Every time Seido goes out to field, the rain seems to pick up. Making things harder is Teito's pitcher is using his 3D strike zone to its fullest, keeping Seido from getting on base. As things pick up in the sixth inning, the rain gets heavier. Satoru Furuya gets in the zone and throws his best pitches of the day. Everyone thinks Furuya will be unbeatable, but as the top of the sixth ends, a pause is called for, ruining all of Furuya's focus.
81	6	"Out of Order"; Transliteration: "OUT OF ORDER" (Japanese: Out of Order)	May 11, 2015
The game resumes in the bottom of the sixth. Kazuya Miyuki gets on with a lead-off double, but Furuya misses the signal and pops out to the third baseman. In the end Miyuki advances to third, but Seido fails to score. At the top of the seventh, Furuya walks the lead-off batter and gives up three consecutive hits. Seido gets one out, but Furuya falls behind again 2–0. Coach Kataoka decides to change pitchers and inserts Sawamura, whom has been warming up in the bullpen during the entire rain delay. Teito's batters try to focus on Sawamura's inside pitch but are shocked with Sawamura's crazy smile and all his outside pitch focus. Sawamura manages to strike out the first batter and gets the next one to ground out to third, halting Teito's momentum with only 1 run.
82	7	"Where I Am"; Transliteration: "Genzaichi" (Japanese: 現在地)	May 18, 2015
Sawamura's arrival causes a slight change of pace in the game. Mukai begins throwing more balls and Seido finally manages to start getting on base more consistently. However, the weather continues to hamper Seido, even leading to a bunt failure from Sawamura. Sawamura counters by continuing to pitch to the outside and forcing 1-2-3 innings until the top of the eighth. A double with two outs gives Teito a chance to increase their lead, but Sawamura forces a ground out to first base to end the inning. At the bottom of the eighth, Mukai forces the first two batters out before giving up a single to Hideaki Tojo and a double to Yoichi Kuramochi. Not wanting to risk a turnaround, Teito walks Haruichi Kominato to load the bases and face off against Kenta Maezono who is hitless on the day.
83	8	"Scenario"; Transliteration: "Sujigaki" (Japanese: 筋書き)	May 25, 2015
Kenta Maezono faces off with Teito and Mukai's 3D strike zone. When he is able to make contact with a couple of outside pitches, Teito decides to try and confuse him by changing it up with an inside pitch. Kenta manages to hit a double, scoring three runs for Seido. All the scouts are shocked to see it is Kenta who gets the hit that seems to turn the game around. For the ninth inning, Sawamura is subbed out and Kawakami is brought in. Kawakami gives up a couple of unexpected timely hits, but some calm words from Miyuki changes his pace and determines the game's final outcome. As the game ends, the sun breaks out on to the field, signifying it approves of whom has won and advanced. After the game, Hiromitsu Ochiai questions Coach Kataoka on why he made some of the moves he did during the game. He realizes Kataoka's coaching style if slowly evolving him and realizes if he doesn't start giving input now, Kataoka may very well not be leaving the team's head coach position.
84	9	"My Path"; Transliteration: "Wagamichi" (Japanese: 我が道)	June 1, 2015
Seido prepares for the second round by moving the batting cages and giving the players a different type of practice than they are used to. Despite the change in practice style, the entire team is aware that if they win their next game a rematch with Inashiro could await them in the third round. Coach Kataoka decides to change up the line-up to confuse their second round opponent, Nanamori. Furuya is placed in left field, but whom will get the starters role? Meanwhile Sawamura practices late into the night trying to regain his use of the inside pitch. Miyuki also decides to ask Watanabe Hisashi to act as the new manager for Seido, replacing Chris.
85	10	"Did You Just Pitch..."; Transliteration: "Nagetayona" (Japanese: 投げたよな)	June 8, 2015
Sawamura is given his first start against Nanamori. Before the game commences, he pitches against Kuramochi and shocks everyone by pitching inside. Meanwhile, Mei Narumiya trains his backup from left field. The episode rotates between Inashiro and Seido matches. Seido gets out to a 5-0 lead as Sawamura comes to the mound. Sawamura accidentally beans the first batter before loading the bases. Nanamori realizes Sawamura is focusing on outside pitches and decides to target them, so Sawamura waves of one call and asks to throw an inside pitch.
86	11	"The Underdog Story"; Transliteration: "Gekokujou" (Japanese: 下克上)	June 15, 2015
Sawamura regains the use of his inside pitch to stun Nanamori. Nanamori is forced to leave the bases loaded in the first inning. Afterwards, Seido's batters continue to dominate the plate, and Sawamura refuses to let anyone on base. Seido ends with a called 11-0 game in 5 innings. After the game, Miyuki comes up to Sawamura and announces he can finally contend for the ace spot. Over at another stadium, Hisashi Watanabe watches the Inashiro game against Ugumori and is stunned to see Inashiro has only scored 1 run. Seiichi Umemiya's aggressive yet reckless plays seems to spark Ugumori as the game goes on, despite him being picked off at the plate on what would be the tying run. As Inashiro reaches the seventh with a batter of second, Umemiya, who has pitched nothing but a slow curve, is forced to unveil his power curve, which the opposition thinks is a slider. The pitch stuns Inashiro and forces a quick 3-outs. The two teams head into the eighth with the score 1-0 and the winner getting Seido in the next round.
87	12	"Self-Destruction"; Transliteration: "Jikai" (Japanese: 自壊)	June 22, 2015
Inashiro asks for a change in player, replacing Hirano as pitcher with Narumiya. With the new team in Inashiro, there is a lack of leader, and coach is thinking of making Narumiya as the team captain. Narumiya strikes out the first batter on his first pitch. Ugumori's player Gacchan manage a steal. Inashiro sends in a messenger. Inashiro teammates reconfirm confidence in Narumiya, but he doesn't seem to need it, he is already confident enough. Narumiya pitches, and resulting in two foul, the catcher called for change-up but Narumiya denies, the cather then called for a forkball but Narumiya refuse, they can't seem to agree on the pitch. Narumiya decides they can force their way with a fastball, but the batter hits resulting in a 2 run for Ugumori. In Seido, Sawamura tells Ochiai that being unable to pitch and walk away is scarier than pitching an inside ball. While Sawamura was looking forward to the rematch he will have with Inashiro, the team gets a call informing them that Inashiro lost. Coach Kunitomo tells Narumiya that an ace who pitches for himself is not a true ace.
88	13	"Fissure"; Transliteration: "Kiretsu" (Japanese: 亀裂)	June 29, 2015
Ugumori celebrates their win over Inashiro Industrial. While at Seido, a fallout ensues between Miyuki and Maezono. On the day of the match, Sawamura, Furuya, and Haruichi encounter Umemiya in the washroom.
89	14	"On My Shoulders"; Transliteration: "Seou Mono" (Japanese: 背負うモノ)	July 6, 2015
Third round of the fall tournament begins. There is an air of tension in Seido's dugout after the fallout between Miyuki and Maezono the night before. However, Miyuki is quick to remind the team to focus on beating the opponent and they agree. At game time, Furuya recalls what Umemiya had told him in the washroom just before their match, and disobeys Miyuki's lead.
90	15	"Persistent and Diligent"; Transliteration: "Nebari Tsuyoku Tantan to" (Japanese: 粘り強く淡々と)	July 13, 2015
Miyuki and Maezono set aside their misunderstanding in order to win. On the other hand, Ugumori team remains cheerful despite being down on runs. Moreover, they make Furuya throw a lot and his pitch count reaches a hundred. However, he is persistent and diligent, pitching low strikes consistently to out the batters.
91	16	"Chain Reaction"; Transliteration: "Rensa Hannou" (Japanese: 連鎖反応)	July 20, 2015
Seido continues to expand their lead. But despite being down by five, Ugumori's team remain unperturbed and cheerful. Finding inspiration from Matsubara's strong will he's continued to show the team, and the cheering crowd behind them, Ugumori's batters attack relentlessly with no plans of stopping.
92	17	"Shut Him Down!!"; Transliteration: "Nejifuseru" (Japanese: ねじ伏せろ!!)	July 27, 2015
After Seido's failed attempt for a double play, the team is in a pinch with bases loaded and no outs. Yet, Seido decides to face Ugumori's momentum head on. However, Ugumori doesn't back down and manage to scale down Seido's lead to one. Coach Kataoka decides to leave the eighth inning to Furuya, then have Sawamura pitch in the ninth.
93	18	"This Guy's Pretty Good"; Transliteration: "Yaruze, Koitsu" (Japanese: やるぜ, コイツ)	August 3, 2015
Sawamura replaces Furuya on the ninth, but feels overwhelmed by the cheering crowd and Umemiya's fighting spirit. Aware of Sawamura's state of mind but at full count, Miyuki takes the time to decide what pitch to call. He thinks of Kataoka's strategy before their defense, but Miyuki calls for a pitch to the inside to strike Umemiya out.
94	19	"An Uncompromising Challenge"; Transliteration: "Dakyounaki Chousen" (Japanese: 妥協なき挑戦)	August 10, 2015
Seido pulls off a double play to beat Ugumori. In a different stadium, Shunshin of Akikawa decides to face Raichi Todoroki of Yakushi head-on at the bottom of the eighth. He corners him but Raichi eventually hits a home run. The Ugumori team reflects on the last pitch and remain optimistic for the summer. At Seido, Miyuki and Maezono are still at odds, and Furuya's injury is discovered.
95	20	"With Heads Held High"; Transliteration: "Ue o Muite Arukou" (Japanese: 上を向いて歩こう)	August 17, 2015
With Miyuki and Maezono still at odds, Jun Isashiki talks to Maezono, while Miyuki seeks Tetsuya Yuki's advice. Coach Kataoka informs the team of Furuya's condition, and Sawamura feels the team's fate is now in his hands. During practice, Watanabe tells Maezono that he is satisfied with how things are, while Ochiai observes the players then thinks of his future coaching plans.
96	21	"Whispers of the Devil?"; Transliteration: "Akuma no Sasayaki?" (Japanese: 悪魔のささやき?)	August 24, 2015
Days before the quarter-finals, the Ouya and Seido baseball teams prepare for their upcoming match. At Ouya, the team practice seemingly in a hurry. While at Seido, Ochiai expresses his disappointment in Miyuki and teaches Sawamura a breaking ball.
97	22	"Winging It"; Transliteration: "Buttsuke Honban" (Japanese: ぶっつけ本番)	August 31, 2015
Sawamura is able to throw his own unique changeup. At game time, Miyuki calls for the change-up after Sawamura strikes out Ouya's first and second hole. Will Sawamura be able to throw it successfully in a real game?
98	23	"School Academic Level"; Transliteration: "Hensachi" (Japanese: 偏差値)	September 7, 2015
Ouya scores two runs at the bottom of the first and seems to have Seido all figured out. However, Sawamura did a good job keeping Ouya to two runs. On top of the sixth and thanks to Watanabe's scouting talent, Seido have a plan to use against Ouya.
99	24	"Individual Minds"; Transliteration: "Sorezore no Zunou" (Japanese: それぞれの頭脳)	September 14, 2015
Aided by Watanabe's keen observation on Ouya's plays, Seido scores two runs on top of the sixth. Coach Araki is quick to notice Seido's strategy and comes up with a counter.
100	25	"Zeal"; Transliteration: "Yakudou" (Japanese: 躍動)	September 21, 2015
Sawamura successfully throws the changeup and the pitch combined with Miyuki's clever game calling makes it difficult for Ouya's batters to focus on a pitch. At the bottom of the ninth, with Ouya failing to turn the game around, Seido takes the win.
101	26	"The Conceited Underclassman"; Transliteration: "Namaiki na Kouhai" (Japanese: 生意気な後輩)	September 28, 2015
Following Seido's win against Ouya, Seiko Academy wins against Sensen Academy. Meanwhile, Inashiro Industrial have a scrimmage against Kokaidai Sagara.
102	27	"Step By Step"; Transliteration: "Ippo... Mata Ippo to" (Japanese: 一歩... また一歩と)	October 5, 2015
Sawamura receives praise from the coaching staff and his teammates for his performance in the last match, and motivates Furuya who asks Ochiai to teach him a breaking ball. Meanwhile, Kawakami wants to keep up and thinks of throwing sinkers again. At practice, seeing that the non-regulars try their best to earn a regular spot, Coach Kataoka proposes an intra-squad match between the first string and the second string.
103	28	"The Resilient Second-String"; Transliteration: "Hikae no Iji" (Japanese: 控えの意地)	October 12, 2015
The intra-squad match begins with Sawamura pitching for Team B. Ochiai, in charge of Team A, makes Haruichi use a metal bat instead of his signature wooden bat and then instructs the team to go for Eijun's high change-ups.
104	29	"Demon Child"; Transliteration: "Akudou" (Japanese: 悪童)	October 19, 2015
The intra-squad game continues. Kataoka's former coach Eijiro Sakaki arrives and observes the team, joining Haruno Yoshikawa and Club President Ota Kazuyoshi in the staff room, and tells the story of Kataoka when he was just 15 years old and was then called the "Demon Child".
105	30	"The Kings' Roar"; Transliteration: "Ouja no Kakegoe" (Japanese: 王者の掛け声)	October 26, 2015
The top four teams of the Fall Tokyo Tournament: Seiko High, Yakushi High, Ichidaisan High, and Seido High make their preparations for the semi-final match-ups.
106	31	"The Courage He Gave Me"; Transliteration: "Kare ga Kureta Yūki" (Japanese: 彼がくれた勇気)	November 2, 2015
The game between Seido High vs Seiko Academy begins. Seido scores early in the game and expands their lead, prompting Seiko to switch their ace with Tsunematsu Ogawa. Ogawa prevents Seido from scoring more than five runs and at the bottom of the third, Seiko's batters swing strongly affecting Furuya's pitching.
107	32	"The Resolve for Responsibility"; Transliteration: "Seou Kakugo" (Japanese: 背負う覚悟)	November 9, 2015
Seido successfully prevents Seiko from scoring on top of the fourth with a double play. However, Furuya's injury seem to be hurting which Kudo notices. Coach Kataoka wants to switch him out but Furuya is determined to continue pitching.
108	33	"The Ace's Instinct"; Transliteration: "Ēsu no Hon'nō" (Japanese: エースの本能)	November 16, 2015
Seiko scores another run on top of the seventh. At the bottom, Seiko's battery continue to strategically walk Miyuki. The next inning, Nagata hits a two-run home run off Sawamura. Will the home run affect Sawamura's confidence?
109	34	"Innocent"; Transliteration: "Inosento" (Japanese: イノセント)	November 23, 2015
Sawamura manages to prevent Seiko from scoring additional runs. And at the bottom of the eighth, Seido fails to score. The next inning, Ogawa runs straight to the plate and tackles Miyuki, shocking everyone.
110	35	"The World Beyond"; Transliteration: "Sono Saki no Sekai" (Japanese: その先の世界)	November 30, 2015
Seiko vs Seido match reaches its conclusion. Seiko Academy is defeated and Seido High advances to the finals.
111	36	"Rematch"; Transliteration: "Natsu no Tsudzuki" (Japanese: 夏の続き)	December 7, 2015
The second match of the semifinals is a rematch between Yakushi High and Ichidaisan High. With Ichidaisan's returnee and new ace, Amahisa Kosei, can the team avenge their bitter Summer loss?
112	37	"Priorities"; Transliteration: "Yūsen Jun'i" (Japanese: 優先順位)	December 14, 2015
With Ichidaisan on the lead and a confident Amahisa on the mound, Yakushi sends Shunpei Sanada to pitch, and the score is put to a standstill. On top of the eighth, runners on base and Raichi at-bat, can Yakushi turn the game around?
113	38	"One Pitch"; Transliteration: "Ma no Ichi-kyū" (Japanese: 魔の一球)	December 21, 2015
Amahisa strikes out Raichi but Sanada changes the flow of the game. Amahisa is switched out and despite Ichidaisan's efforts, they lost to Yakushi for the second time.
114	39	"Meeting Expectations"; Transliteration: "Kitai ni Kotaetai" (Japanese: 期待に、応えたい)	January 4, 2016
The Seido High players looks forward to the finals match against Yakushi High. While Furuya is determined to play, Kataoka leaves it to the doctors opinion. At Yakushi, the players share their goals to the third years.
115	40	"Play Ball"; Transliteration: "Maku wa Matana" (Japanese: 幕は待たない)	January 11, 2016
Kuramochi talks to Kenjiro Shirasu about Miyuki's injury, while the coaching staff talks about the possibility of Furuya not playing, and the pitcher order: Kawakami will start, then Sawamura. On the day of the finals, Kuramochi confronts Miyuki.
116	41	"The Lead-off Man"; Transliteration: "Toppakō" (Japanese: 突破口)	January 18, 2016
The finals match begin with Seido's offense. Kuramochi shows his prowess as Seido's lead-off, but despite making it to third, Seido doesn't score. At the bottom, Kawakami starts for Seido and Miyuki calls for the sinker.
117	42	"Fastball, Featuring Todoroki"; Transliteration: "Todoroki Kyū" (Japanese: 轟 球)	January 25, 2016
Seido scores the first run of the game with Maezono's bat while Kawakami pitches strongly at the bottom. On top of the third, Seido on scoring position and Miyuki at-bat, Yakushi Coach Raizou Todoroki makes his move to send Raichi to the mound to face Miyuki.
118	43	"To This Side"; Transliteration: "Kotchi-gawa e" (Japanese: こっち側へ)	February 1, 2016
Kawakami continues to hold Yakushi's batters down. At the bottom, at-bat, he faces off against Raichi. Kawakami hits but the strength of Raichi's pitch numbs his hand. Will this affect Kawakami's pitching?
119	44	"The Best Fastball"; Transliteration: "Saikō no Sutorēto" (Japanese: 最高のストレート)	February 8, 2016
Thinking that it's too early to walk off the mound, Kawakami pitches and the batter hits the ball and Kuramochi thinks that they can get a double play if he stops it, but just as the ball is passing the mound, Kawakami interferes with the ball's course and taps it away from its original path towards Kuramochi. Quickly alters his path to follow the ball, Kuramochi catches it and throws backwards to Haruichi who catches it and throws it to first successfully completing the double play. With two outs, Nori consecutively walks two batters. In the dugout, Coach Kataoka tells Shinji Kanemaru to fetch Sawamura. The scene pans to the Yakushi dugout where Raizou reveals that the reason why Kawakami is messing up is because he probably can't feel anything with his fingertips from the impact of Raichi's pitches. Feeling the pressure of being on the mound, Kawakami pitches but the batter connects to it and the second-base runner ties the game. Sawamura walks out to the field and towards the mound where, after giving words of encouragement to Sawamura, Kawakami walks back to the dugout. Sawamura pitches against Akiba who is unable to hit the first pitch. The next pitch is a ball to the outside and Akiba jams the final pitch. However, the third-baseman fails to catch the ball and the runner scores causing Yakushi to take the lead. Sawamura pitches again and Yakushi makes their move, both runners try to steal, but Masuda fouls the pitch and the following pitches. When the batter chokes up on the bat in preparation for a change-up, Miyuki notices and tells Sawamura to pitch his best fastball, one that he had been practicing a ton the night before. The pitch becomes a swinging strikeout. Becoming too excited with wanting to bat Sawamura's pitches, Raichi loses his previous pitch control and walks Haruichi. But when Miyuki walks up to bat, Raichi suddenly fixes his control and strikes Miyuki out with the latter unable to make any contact with the ball. Walking back to the dugout, Miyuki apologizes to Maezono. Everyone is shocked that Miyuki was unable to touch the ball in such a critical moment and questions what might have happened to him. Maezono goes up to bat and wonders why Miyuki apologized and then realizes that Miyuki might be injured from the tackle in the game against Seiko.
120	45	"The Field"; Transliteration: "Soko ni Tassha" (Japanese: そこに立っ者)	February 15, 2016
At the top of the fifth, Maezono is up to bat with one out, bases loaded. The first pitch is a ball, the second is a foul, then another ball, another foul, and the last ball makes it a full count. Finally, hitting the ball, Maezono pops a fly, but Kuramochi makes it back home and scores, tying the game. Shirasu gets a base on balls and the bases are loaded again. Now realizing what kind of place the mound is, Raichi's pitching fails to advance the game. Having no other choice, Raizou swaps the players around. Raichi covers third, and in turn the third baseman, Mishima covers first and the first baseman. Sanada is pitching. The count is two outs, one ball, and the bases are loaded. Mine observes the switch and comments that it is Yakushi's best formation. Knowing that Seido is going to bat aggressively, Akiba wants to get Higasa to hit an infield grounder. Sanada pitches and Higasa hits it to third base where Raichi is. He catches the ball and throws it to Mishima at first, who barely catches the throw, but nevertheless gets the out. Maezono, overly concerned about Miyuki, pesters him, asking him if he's sure he's okay. Kuramochi tells him to stop, but Maezono doesn't. Coach Kataoka then asks Miyuki if he is fine, and Miyuki tells if it looks like he is dragging the team down with his play, then to switch him out. Kataoka agrees and says he'll switch him out no matter how they feel if they're hurting the team, or themselves. Yakushi is up the bat with the next batters being the clean-up. Sawamura's first pitch is a strike and Mishima fouls the next one. Miyuki calls for the next pitch and thinks that instead of being afraid of dragging everyone's morale down, he should have been more straightforward. Sawamura then pitches, and it's a change-up, which strikes out Mishima. Next up to bat is Raichi.
121	46	"The Decision" (Japanese: 独断)	February 22, 2016
Raichi is up to bat and Sawamura greets him with a fastball to the inside which Raichi hits into left field. Up next to bat is Sanada, to whom Miyuki calls for a moving fastball to the outside. Raichi goes for the steal and manages to get it. In between that play, Miyuki catches the pitch and throws it to Kuramochi on second, but misthrows and the ball falls short of Kuramochi's mitt. Calling for a time-out, Miyuki tells Sawamura to focus on the batter and that the plan is to pitch one to the inside before finishing Sanada with a change-up. Giving a few words to Miyuki, they get back in positions and Miyuki calls for Sawamura to pitch a cutter to the batter's chest. Feeling determined, Sanada hits the cutter and it goes into center field. Now there's one out with runners on first and third. Seido brings in their infielders a bit and Raizou tells Hirahata to believe in his swing. Miyuki wants to make Hirahata hit a grounder, but instead, the latter decides to bunt. The second pitch is a ball but on the third one Hirahata bunts again, this time it succeeds and Raichi runs home, putting Yakushi back into lead. The count is now two strikes with a runner on second. Batting seventh, Yakushi hits a grounder to second and gives up their third out. At the top of the sixth, Yakushi is in the lead, 4 to 3, and batting first is Sawamura. Meanwhile, Miyuki is getting checked out by a doctor who says that while nothing's broken, his oblique muscles might be injured. Rei Takashima reprimands Miyuki that she knows very well what happened to Chis when he was injured. Miyuki says that he's left the decision on whether or not he stays on the field to Kataoka and as long he out on there, he'll do his best. Back to the game at hand, Aso barely makes it to first base and Kuramochi is up next and he strikes out. Toujou is up next and he also gets out, making that the third out. Sawamura is back up to pitch and strikes out all three batters getting a three for three. Neither team scores in the sixth inning and they head into the seventh.
122	47	"Partnership" (Japanese: パートナーシップ)	February 29, 2016
At the top of the seventh, Haruichi is up to bat. Sanada throws a powerful shootball that breaks Haruichi's wooden bat and he is out on first. Miyuki bats next but before that, Yakushi's former pitcher Mino recalls a conversation he had with Sanada and believes they can make it to the Nationals. Back to the game, Miyuki is out on a grounder to third while Maezono struck out with a cutter to the outside. Bottom of the seventh, Sawamura gets the first out by jamming Masuda. Batting next is Mishima. Sawamura quickly gets two strikes, frustrating Mishima. He fights it out with fouls before getting on base with a hit into left field. Raichi is at-bat next and Seido's battery decides to face him head-on. The first pitch is the change-up and Raichi went for it, but is a foul. The second pitch is another change-up and another foul. The third pitch is a pitch that Raichi has been waiting for, but it's a swing and miss. Two outs and a runner on base, up to bat is Sanada. Sawamura opens up with a change-up for the first strike. The second and third pitch are fastballs which are supposed to be balls but Sanada swings anyway. The fourth pitch is a change-up, a swing and miss for Sanada and that's the third out. Yakushi once again, fail to score additional runs.
123	48	"Party Boys" (Japanese: お祭り男ども)	March 7, 2016
After the Miyuki and Sawamura battery prevail against Yakushi's clean-up batters, Sawamura receives compliment from his teammates for his performance. And Coach Kataoka entrusts him in the eighth inning. Wakana, shown watching from the bleachers, has a flashback of Sawamura mailing her details of Seido's victory against Ouya. Wakana sends a message saying that she wanted to see Sawamura's daily growth in person— a mail that Sawamura is yet to see. Back to the game, Coach Kataoka tells his players to be aggressive, swing hard and pressure hard. At the top of the eighth, Shirasu is up to bat. He stands on the line to pressure Sanada and to seal inside pitches. Sanada doesn't back down, throwing an inside pitch for the first strike. The second pitch, Shirasu is out on a liner to first. Batting seventh is Seido's pinch hitter Kanemaru. The first pitch is a ball. Kanemaru hits afterwards and the ball goes over Raichi to left field. He gets a double. Sawamura is up, bunting to advance Kanemaru to third. Batting ninth is Asou, who stands away from the plate. He baits an inside pitch but gets out on first. Nonetheless, he receives praise from his teammates. Bottom of the eighth, Yakushi leads by one, Sawamura hold the Yakushi batters down. At the top of the ninth, Coach Raizou gives his players words of encouragement. Seido is back to the top of their batting order. Kuramochi hits right to the second baseman, taking him down for the first out. Batting second is Tojo who is very determined to get on base.
124	49	"Just You Wait!" (Japanese: 待ってろ!)	March 14, 2016
Continuing at the top of the ninth, Kuramochi feels down that he wasn't able to get on base. Sawamura approaches him asking to play catch ball and they join Furuya and Ono at the bullpen. Back to the game with no runners on base and one out, it's Tojo's turn at-bat. The first pitch is a ball. The second pitch, Tojou hits a grounder to the shortstop but is out on first. Yakushi is now one out away from winning the game, and both Furuya and Sawamura cheer the batters. Following Tojou is Haruichi. He hits the shootball, and the ball goes into centerfield. He makes it to first base and looks to steal second. Batting next is Miyuki who hasn't had a hit yet. The first pitch is a strike but Haruichi manages to steal second. The second pitch is a ball to the outside followed by another wide pitch. Raizou is feeling more tense and calls for the time-out. A messenger is sent to the mound telling the team that they may concede a run for they still have the bottom of the inning. The game resumes, Miyuki fights with fouls and eventually an infield hit between short and second. He gets to first while Haruichi advances to third. Batting fifth is Maezono and the outfielders have moved out expecting a big hit. The first pitch is a swing and miss on Maezono but Miyuki steals second. The second pitch however, is another strike, this time on the outside. With their backs to the wall, will Maezono land a hit?
125	50	"Last Inning" (Japanese: ラストイニング)	March 21, 2016
At the top of the ninth, after two outs, Seido managed to put Miyuki and Haruichi on base. However, Maezono is cornered at 0-2 and a single strike can end the game. Sanada throws to the outside and Maezono fights with fouls. Maezono eventually hits with the ball going over the second baseman. Haruichi scores from third base tying the game at 4-4. Mimura notices the fielder didn't catch well, and signals Miyuki to run all the way through. He gets to the plate and scores giving Seido the lead. Following the 2-RBI from Maezono, Sanada retires Shirasu for the third out then he apologize to his team. Bottom of the ninth, Sawamura asks Coach Kataoka to let him pitch. However, Kataoka decides to send Furuya instead. The crowd cheers, and so does Sawamura who impress both Miyuki and Furuya with his attitude. On the mound, Furuya asks Miyuki if he's alright. Miyuki tells the pitcher doesn't have to worry. Furuya is relieved remarking that he can go all out, surprising Miyuki and he leaves the mound giggling to the surprise of many. As he returns to his position, he thinks to himself that he can't be a good captain, not willing to give up his position to anyone. At game time, Akiba's at bat, Miyuki calls the first pitch, a fastball to the inside.
126	51	"Seek Diamonds!"	March 28, 2016
Furuya cleanly closes out the match before Raichi gets to bat, ending the match with Seido's victory. At the lineup, Sanada realizes Miyuki has been injured all this time and feels frustrated that they failed to notice. Mishima apologizes to Raichi for not getting the fourth batter the chance to bat. Raichi smiles saying that he wanted to face Furuya and didn't want the match to end, bringing Mishima to tears. Behind the dugout, Coach Kataoka apologizes to Miyuki for prioritizing the win thus letting Miyuki play, despite an initial plan of switching Miyuki out the last inning. Miyuki is happy that he was able to help the team, and he is then sent to the hospital accompanied by Maezono, Kuramochi and Rei. Out of the stadium, the third years congratulate the team, and Coach Kataoka is brought to tears as he tells the seniors that they are part of the reason they won and thanks them. Meanwhile, Haruichi, Furuya and Sawamura leave the stadium later than their teammates. As they near the exit, Sawamura declares he will steal the ace number from Furuya, who smiles in response and says that he won't lose.
