= Ace of Diamond season 1 =

Ace of Diamond
- Season 1
- No. of episodes: 75

Release
- Original network: TX Network
- Original release: 6 October 2013 – 29 March 2015

Season chronology
- Next → Season 2

Ace of Diamond is an anime series based on the manga by Yuji Terajima serialized in Weekly Shōnen Magazine. The TV series was produced by Madhouse and Production I.G and began airing on October 6, 2013, on TX Network stations and later on AT-X. The episodes were simulcast in the United States, Canada, United Kingdom, Ireland, Australia, New Zealand, South Africa, Denmark, Finland, Iceland, the Netherlands, Norway, Sweden, Central and South America, Spain, Brazil, and Portugal by Crunchyroll with English and German subtitles. The series was initially planned to be 52 episodes but was extended until March 2015 for a total of 75 episodes.

Nine pieces of theme musics are used for the episodes: three opening and six ending themes. From episodes 1–25, the opening theme is "Go EXCEED!!" by Tom-H@ck featuring Masayoshi Ōishi, while the ending themes are "Seek Diamonds" by Yōko Hikasa and "Glory!" (グローリー！) by Suzuko Mimori. From episodes 26–51, the opening theme is "Perfect HERO" by Tom-H@ck featuring Masayoshi Ōishi, while the ending themes are "Mirai e Tsunage" (未来へつなげ) by DŌP and "CLOUD NINE" by Ryōta Ōsaka, Nobunaga Shimazaki, and Natsuki Hanae. From episodes 52–75, the opening theme is "Hashire! Mirai" (疾走れ！ミライ; Run Ahead Toward the Future!) by GLAY, while the ending themes are "PROMISED FIELD" by Ryōta Ōsaka, Nobunaga Shimazaki, and Natsuki Hanae and "FINAL VICTORY" by Ryōta Ōsaka featuring the Seido High School Baseball Team.

== Episodes ==
No.	Title	Directed by	Written by	Original air date
1	"The One Pitch"; Transliteration: "Unmei no Ikkyū" (Japanese: 運命の一球)	Hironori Aoyagi	Kenji Konuta	October 6, 2013
Eijun Sawamura, the pitcher of a novice junior high baseball team, meets with a bitter walk-off loss. For Sawamura, the loss becomes his last game in junior high, so he sets a new goal of going to the nationals in high school with his teammates. As he begins his hard quest on studying, a guest arrives unannounced. Her name is Rei Takashima. Rei had been watching his last game and believes Sawamura has a gift. She is the assistant director of the prestigious Seido High School Baseball Team, and she invites Sawamura to Seido after seeing his potential. Sawamura's reply shocks her, but Takashima refuses to give up and tricks Sawamura into a visit.
2	"Partner"; Transliteration: "Aibō" (Japanese: 相棒)	Tatsuya Shiraishi	Kenji Konuta	October 13, 2013
Kazuya Miyuki becomes the catcher for Sawamura in a contest against Seido's dangerous clean-up batter, Kiyokuni Azuma. As Eijun tries to pitch down the middle, he finds himself tense and unable to control the ball. Kazuya immediately calls time and comes out to give him some words of encouragement. The words have the desired effect as Eijun finds more control than ever before and unveils a dangerous weapon he did not know he had. Seeing how people like Kazuya can alter his pitching, Eijun decides to come to Seido as long as he can become the ace of the team.
3	"Not Qualified to Be a Pitcher?"; Transliteration: "Tōshu Shikkaku?" (Japanese: 投手失格？)	Mitsutaka Noshitani	Junichi Fujisaku	October 20, 2013
Eijun is nervous about rooming with older teammates, but they make him feel a too little at home on his first night. Eijun ends up oversleeping and shows up late when it's time to meet Coach Tesshin Kataoka, a former Japanese professional pitcher. Miyuki also shows up late, but he uses Sawamura as a decoy to sneak into his line. Kataoka shows no mercy and says Eijun will never become a pitcher if he can't show up on time. Kataoka also makes Miyuki run laps, as well as Eijun's two roommates for allowing him to oversleep. Sawamura is determined to prove he can be the ace though, so Coach Kataoka gives him a special challenge, saying until he can complete this challenge, he can't play in a baseball game for Seido.
4	"Are You Like Me?"; Transliteration: "Onaji Taipu?" (Japanese: 同じタイプ？)	Shinichi Shimizu	Daishirō Tanimura	October 27, 2013
Seidou faces off against Ichidai Third High School, the school that beat them last year. While their top-level offense rakes in runs, the ace Tanba struggles, and the game turns into a batting contest. However Sawamura isn't present. Instead he is training back at school. During his training Furuya, another first-year pitcher, approaches him. Showing sympathy to Sawamura's peculiar training method, Furuya offers to play catch with him. Sawamura is in a cheery mood with Furuya's kindness, but the speed of Furuya's throws far exceeds his expectations.
5	"A Clash"; Transliteration: "Gekitotsu" (Japanese: 激突)	Akira Kusune	Takahiro Udagawa	November 3, 2013
Coach Kataoka, or "Shades" as Sawamura calls him, organizes a game between the first years and the non-starters on the second and third year teams. The goal is to determine who will join the starters for upcoming practice games. When Sawamura comes across Kataoka in the bath, the coach gives him one final chance to answer his question. After the answer is given, Sawamura is allowed into the upcoming game, but when he starts as an outfielder, it could spell doom for any chance he has on the varsity team.
6	"Head to Head!"; Transliteration: "Makkō Shōbu" (Japanese: 真っ向勝負！)	Yukio Nishimoto	Takahiro Udagawa	November 10, 2013
Thanks to the words of fellow first year Haruichi Kominato, Eijun makes it on base. Next, Haruichi promises to bring him home and get the first years a run. Haruichi proves to be a brilliant batter, and thanks to his spring Eijun scores. However the first years quickly get three outs, and Coach Kataoka says he will call it a game unless all the first years agree to continue. Most want to drop out, but thanks to words of encouragement from Eijun they decide to continue. Eijun is placed on the mound, and Hariuchi is placed at shortstop. The two seem to be working effectively together against the older students until Eijun's upperclassman roommate Masuko comes to the plate. Can Eijun find a way to strike out his roommate, who is the #5 hitter for the JV team?
7	"The Two Batteries"; Transliteration: "Futatsu no Batterī" (Japanese: ふたつのバッテリー)	Jun Nakagawa	Daishirō Tanimura	November 17, 2013
The game concludes, and Furuya and Masuko are promoted to varsity while Eijun and Haruichi are promoted to JV. Along with the promotion comes additional pitchers training for Furuya and Eijun. However, their training can only be done with the partners that Coach Kataoka assigns them. Furuya is assigned to work with Miyuki, while Sawamura is assigned to work with Chris Yu Takigawa. However, instead of catching Eijun's pitch, Chris continually gives him additional work that isn't pitching, making Eijun think the coach has gotten the last laugh and that he won't succeed at Seido. This episode covers chapters 17 to 19.
8	"The Truth About Chris"; Transliteration: "Kurisu no Shinjitsu" (Japanese: クリスの真実)	Itsuro Kawasaki	Kenji Konuta	November 24, 2013
Chris continues to leave practice early and gives Eijun additional workouts. Eijun believes Chris is slacking off and has given up on making the first string, but what makes him mad the most is when Chris tells him he will never be the ace as long as Furuya is on the team. Rei Takashima reveals she was the one who assigned Eijun to work with Chris because of his knowledge of the game, and when Eijun badmouths Chris, he ticks off Miyuki. Rei ends up taking Eijun to see one of Chris rehab practices and reveals he is the only man Miyuki has never beaten. She reveals that Chris is recovering from a shoulder injury he caused to worsen by continuing to play while he was hurt. The workouts he assigns Eijun before leaving for the day are to strengthen and protect him. Eijun realizes Chris was trying to make it where he wouldn't get hurt and begs Chris to teach him baseball.
9	"With Chagrin in His Heart"; Transliteration: "Kuyashisa, Mune ni Kizande" (Japanese: 悔しさ、胸に刻んで)	Shū Watanabe	Junichi Fujisaku	December 1, 2013
Sawamura begins to follow Chris everywhere to try to learn more about baseball. He also sits out of some practices so he can learn how the communication of a team works. Chris finally gives in to Eijun's persistence and catches a few of his pitches. After catching them, Chris informs Eijun he must find his specialty if he is to be truly effective as a pitcher. At first, Sawamura is confused. He knows his speed isn't the best and he can't throw breaking balls, so what could be his specialty. Eventually Sawamura decides his specialty is his control, but focusing solely on control lowers his speed and allows him to get slaughtered in weekend a game. Can Sawamura figure out what his specialty truly is before being demoted?
10	"Hone Your Moving Fastball"; Transliteration: "Migake, Kusedama" (Japanese: 磨け、クセ球)	Takeyuki Sadohara	Junichi Fujisaku	December 8, 2013
Chris finally tells Eijun what sets him apart is his moving fastball. He reveals all the training he's given Eijun could make him the ace if he does it regularly for one year. However, Eijun wants to thank Chris personally by delivering his best pitch to him in a game. One night when he's doing secret practices, Coach Kataoka catches him and threatens to split him up from Chris. When Eijun tells him his reason for practicing this way at night, he recommends Eijun start a towel exercise that will improve his flexibility and control. Now with his speed back and his movement becoming better than ever, Sawamura is ready for his final JV game. The only question is will there be a catcher available to help him and catch his moving fastball?
11	"Chris to the Field!"; Transliteration: "Kurisu Shutsujin!" (Japanese: クリス出陣！)	Shinichi Shimizu	Kenji Konuta	December 15, 2013
Eijun appears to have greater speed on his moving fast ball than ever before. However, his control has gone hectic. After walking the bases loaded with no outs, Coach Kataoka signals for a change. Most of the team believes it will be Eijun getting subbed out. Instead, Chris is inserted into the game. He calls all the infield together and reveals a plan that he believes will turn the momentum around completely. The only question is whether or not Eijun will be able to do so with all his wild pitches.
12	"Target"; Transliteration: "Tāgetto" (Japanese: ターゲット)	Mitsutaka Noshitani	Takahiro Udagawa	December 22, 2013
Chris has Miyuki join him and Sawamura in the bullpen as they try to master Sawamura's new pitching form and get him to start throwing strikes with it. Chris's father Jorge "Animal" M. shows up at the game and tries to get Chris to stop playing, believing his shoulder isn't healed yet and that he will only cause further damage to himself. In order to stop Seido's momentum, Naoyuki Zaizen suggests they change the target from trying to destroy Sawamura to trying to destroy Chris.
13	"You're in the First-String"; Transliteration: "Ichigun Shōkaku" (Japanese: 一軍昇格)	Tomoya Tanaka	Daishirō Tanimura	December 29, 2013
To stop the attacks on Chris, Sawamura reverts to his original pitching form while maintaining the wall against the dangerous Naoyuki Zaizen. The results not only improve Sawamura's speed, but they start putting pressure on Zaizen and reveal an injury he had earlier. With Chris and Zaizen being of equal strength now, the momentum swings back to Seido. After 3 innings, Chris and Sawamura are pulled from the game. The game concludes and the Coach calls everyone together. Two players are moved up to the varsity team, and many third years have their hearts broken. While Chris isn't brought up to play, he is brought up as a manager for the varsity team.
14	"Training Camp Begins!"; Transliteration: "Gasshuku Sutāto!" (Japanese: 合宿スタート！)	Yoshihisa Matsumoto	Daishirō Tanimura	January 12, 2014
Sawamura continues to train hard, but when Chris notices he is overworking, he has Miyuki pull him into the indoor training facility for some pickoff training and leg positioning training so he won't get hurt. Furuya is reminded he must trim his nails and is also forced to start pickoff training. Furuya tells Miyuki he has a twisted personality. Tanba watches his rivals and vows not to give the ace number to anyone else. As hell week begins, Tanba and Kawakami are sent to the bullpen while Sawamura and Furuya are forced to work on fielding practice and base coverage scenarios. Once their coverage scenarios are done they are sent out for outfield catching. In the bullpen, Tanba works on a secret pitch with Miyauchi, a secondary varsity catcher. When the 100 yard sprints start and the night workouts increase, Sawamura realizes him and his fellow first years haven't prepared for anything like this.
15	"Lead With Your Plays!"; Transliteration: "Purē de Hippare!" (Japanese: プレーで引っぱれ！)	Yoriyasu Kogawa	Kenji Konuta	January 19, 2014
As day two of training camp begins, Sawamura is in the batting circle, but all the balls are at his feet. Sawamura is sent out to do fielding practice without having made a single hit, but he blames it all on being tired. As the training camp continues, Sawamura finds himself slowly improving, though he is removed from outfield practice due to his horrible plays. Chris lets him pitch, though only into the net. Unknown to everyone, the Coach arranges three practice games for the weekend to see how everyone will do at maximum fatigue. Sawamura and Furuya are scheduled to pitch the game held on Saturday, while Tanba and Kawakami are scheduled to do Sunday's double header. After practice Furuya and Eijun find themselves called into Miyuki's room. Upon entering, they see all the varsity team upper classman relaxing. At first, Eijun thinks they are going to beat him for taking Chris's roster spot, but Miyuki's motive is to get the two freshmen pitchers to spend time with the upper classmen who will be fielding behind them. As Day 5 hits, Sawamura and Furuya are sent into the bullpen to pitch and told they will pitch both batting practice and in the bullpen on Day 6 to get ready for their game on Day 7. Meanwhile the coach starts to punish the upper classman in fielding practice by taking over the batting practice.
16	"Challenge"; Transliteration: "Shiren" (Japanese: 試練)	Mitsuko Ōya	Takahiro Udagawa	January 26, 2014
The practice game between Seido and Osaka Kiryu begins with Furuya determined not to give up any hits after remembering the coaches words, "go get obliterated today." The first batter nails his fastball deep to the outfield. A bases loaded walk gives Kiryu a 3-0 lead and prompts a visit to the mound by Miyuki. The visit reminds Furuya to trust in the fielders around him. Furuya begins to intentionally give up hits so his outfielders can cover for his current weakness.
17	"Games Are Fun"; Transliteration: "Shiai wa Tanoshii" (Japanese: 試合は楽しい)	Tatsuya Shiraishi	Junichi Fujisaku	February 2, 2014
Kiryu's ace, Hiromi Toshi, continues to dominate Seidou's batters as his speed increases as the game goes on. Miyuki decides to play a game with Toshi and has Furuya pitch full out with the goal of striking out the ace. To show off more of his dominance, Furuya hits a homer off of Toshi in the bottom of the fifth. As the two teams appear to become even, we reach the sixth inning. Sawamura is brought in to pitch the remaining four innings while Furuya is sent to the outfield to give him fielding practice and additional at bats. Takahiro Matsumoto gets pissed, thinking his team is merely practice targets for Seidou's first years. Sawamura experiences pitching problems similar to Furuya's. However because his previous team was weak, he is used to such situations and quickly begins to adjust.
18	"I Hate It, But..."; Transliteration: "Mukatsuku kedo" (Japanese: ムカつくけど)	Akira Shimizu	Junichi Fujisaku	February 9, 2014
Miyuki continues to try to get Sawamura to pitch inside and gain additional control, but his motivational speeches seem to have little to no effect on Sawamura. Sawamura begins to try to trust in his infielder's, and as he does so he sees his pitching begin to improve. While many runs are given up, both Sawamura and Furuya learn the lessons the coach hoped to have them learn in the training camp. After the game Coach Matsumoto acknowledges Sawamura's ability and praises how it can be a secret weapon if it is utilized correctly, but only with a little refining.
19	"Fate"; Transliteration: "Innen" (Japanese: 因縁)	Itsuro Kawasaki	Daishirō Tanimura	February 16, 2014
A 3-set of matches takes place to end the training week of hell as Inashiro Industrial vs. Seidou, Inashiro Industrial vs. Shuuhoku, and Shuuhoku vs. Seidou on Seidou's field. Kawakami pitches the game vs. Inashiro Industrial with Miyauchi while Tanba is forced to work with Miyuki. None of the starters play in the match vs. Inashiro Industrial, though Furuya is positioned in left field for the entire game. Inashiro Industrial brings out their starters for the second game, including southpaw ace Narumiya Mei. Mei already has a wicked slider, curve ball, and fast ball, but in the game he debuts a change up pitch that could make him unbeatable. Finally we start the Shuuhoku vs. Seidou match. Through 6 innings Miyuki has Tanba throw nothing but curveballs and fastballs, but in the seventh inning Tanba debuts his new fork ball.
20	"Emergency"; Transliteration: "Kinkyū Jitai" (Japanese: 緊急事態)	Shigeru Yamazaki	Takahiro Udagawa	February 23, 2014
The second half of the Seidou, Shuuhoku match begins with Tanba unveiling his fork ball. Combined with his fastball and his curve ball Seidou seems to have a new found sense of confidence. As Tanba comes to bat however, Shuuhoku's pitcher loses control of one pitch and forces an emergency cancellation of the game and leads to something that could ruin Seidou's season. As the players are feeling depressed, the summer tournament bracket is revealed. In order to play Inashiro Industrial, Seidou will have to make it to the Tokyo Final. Sawamura is told to get better with his control and also told he'll debut when the time is right. Additional training is given to Sawamura and Furuya while some of the seniors are forced to start pitching training to help motivate them and prepare them should 3 pitchers not be enough.
21	"To the Dream Stage"; Transliteration: "Yume no Butai e" (Japanese: 夢の舞台へ)	Takeyuki Sadohara	Kenji Konuta	March 2, 2014
Kanemaru helps Sawamura get ready for the exams. Until Sawamura passes all his exams, he will be ineligible to play in a game. After a few practices, he manages to get a 30, two 35's, and a 36 on his test making him eligible for the tourney. As Chris watches Sawamura pitch into the net, he secretly thinks up how he can fine tune Sawamura's grip into a great weapon that no one will be able to defeat. Furuya isn't as lucky and is forced to take the makeup test. Everyone receives their numbers. The opening ceremonies are held for the Tokyo Tournament. Only two schools, those whom make the championship game, will be able to go on to the National Tournament. After the Opening Ceremony, Seidou returns to their practice facility. Furuya and Sawamura get used to the fielding, but Kawakami appears to be struggling. Realizing it's time to boost Kawakami's confidence, the Coach takes him aside and announces he will be their ace closer and to not worry about having to start. Furuya is named the starter. Seidou opens its first match against Maimon West, who is about to see what Furuya's fastball is all about.
22	"Calling for Attention"; Transliteration: "Apīru Taimu" (Japanese: アピールタイム)	Tomoya Tanaka	Takahiro Udagawa	March 9, 2014
Seidou shows Maimon West that they are underestimating no one in the tournament. After being retired 1-2-3 in the top of the first, Seidou manages to score 3 in the top of the second. Meanwhile Furuya continues to strike out batter after batter with his high fastball. Seidou goes on to continue punishing Maimon West, gaining a 15-0 lead.
23	"First Official Appearance"; Transliteration: "Kōshikisen Debyū" (Japanese: 公式戦デビュー)	Makoto Fuchigami	Daishirō Tanimura	March 16, 2014
With a 15-0 lead in place, Seidou brings in Sawamura to pitch inning 4. The game ends up being called, and Seidou advances with ease. Seeing how high Furuya's ball was, Chris takes Sawamura aside and teaches him how to hold the ball and turn his pitch into a fine weapon no one will be expecting. Seidou then participates in their second game of the tournament against Puplic Murata East High School.
24	"Clockwork"; Transliteration: "Seimitsu Kikai" (Japanese: 精密機械)	Yoshihisa Matsumoto	Junichi Fujisaku	March 23, 2014
The match between Seidou and Puplic Murata East ends with Seidou getting another called game, 10-0 after 5 innings. Seidou sticks around to watch the next game and sees Akikawa Academy's Shunshin Yeung and his clockwork control. Yeung pitches mostly to the outside corners, and his rotation of the spots makes it hard for batters to predict where it will be. Seidou begins planning immediately to combat it. Scouts and magazine writers head to Seidou to watch Furuya pitch. However Miyuki realizes Furuya's body isn't used to Tokyo's heat after coming down from Hokkaido and limits him to 10 pitches. Everyone that sticks around gets to watch Sawamura work on his inside control with Kanemaru in the batting circle. The next day the reporters head to Akikawa where they are shocked to see Yeung is the pitcher for the practice sessions. They also see the pitching machine turned up full throttle so Akikawa's players can get used to seeing the speed with their eyes, even if they can't hit it.
25	"Anti-Furuya Strategy"; Transliteration: "Furuya Kōryaku" (Japanese: 降谷攻略)	Mitsuko Ōya	Kenji Konuta	March 30, 2014
The night before the game, Coach Kataoka stands in the batters box and has Sawamura pitch to him. Sawamura's pitch decides his fate for the Akikawa game. As the game begins, Furuya once again pitches full out. However Akikawa reveals a plan to wear him out through bunts and forcing more lack of control. Miyuki realizes their plan and comes up with a counterattack, but will Furuya be able to execute it?
26	"Miracle Akikawa"; Transliteration: "Mirakuru Akikawa" (Japanese: ミラクル明川)	Mitsutaka Noshitani	Takahiro Udagawa	April 6, 2014
In the top of the first, Shunshin Yeung comes to the plate and forces Furuya to throw a meat ball which he nails to left, giving Akikawa a 2-0 lead early on. With the lead Yeung heads to the mound and is able to start his precision throwing. Yeung comes up with a plan that he believes will destroy Seidou if it is executed to perfection, but it requires getting one more run off of Furuya.
27	"I'm Not Running"; Transliteration: "Nigenē zo" (Japanese: 逃げねえぞ)	Jun Nakagawa	Junichi Fujisaku	April 13, 2014
As the heat continues to increase, Coach Kataoka declares that if Furuya even lets one batter on base, he will switch him out. At first this declaration provides Furuya the motivation he needs to get stronger, and his pitch gets faster. However Akikawa begins to use their bunt plan efficiently forcing Furuya to tire himself even more. With no other choice, a pitcher change is called for. Sawamura is called into action. After nearly throwing the ball away on a toss to first base, Miyuki calls for a four-seam fastball to the inside, the exact pitch Sawamura used against the coach the night before. We see the results of that pitch. Akikawa hesitates being unable to see Sawamura's pitch due to his form, and Sawamura forces a pop out to third to get out of the 4th inning.
28	"Path, Eijun Sawamura to the Scorching Mound"; Transliteration: "Kiseki Sawamura Eijun Nettō no Maundo e" (Japanese: 軌跡 沢村栄純 熱闘のマウンドへ)	Jun Nakagawa	Kenji Konuta	April 20, 2014
This episode serves as a recap of the first 27 episodes, showing how Eijun Sawamura joined the Seidou High School Baseball team, his struggles with the JV, and his eventual rise to play in the tournament all while hoping to become the ace of the team.
29	"Neck and Neck"; Transliteration: "Kikkō" (Japanese: 拮抗)	Shū Watanabe	Daishirō Tanimura	April 27, 2014
Sawamura's moving fastball and four seamer continue to cause problems for Akikawa's batters. As Seidou's batters start to get on base, Miyuki comes to the plate and is able to predict the pitches Shunshin Yeung will make. Miyuki's at bat not only helps Seidou's batters improve, but Tanba is sent to the bullpen to warm-up and cause an additional scare for Akikawa's batters. Will it all be enough to reverse the score and give Seidou the lead?
30	"Winner and Loser"; Transliteration: "Shōsha to Haisha" (Japanese: 勝者と敗者)	Mitsutaka Noshitani	Daishirō Tanimura	May 4, 2014
Ichidai continues to watch the game between Seidou and Akikawa, declaring the next team to score will win in this 2-2 tie. Coach Kataoka inserts Haruichi as a pinch hitter, and he responds by getting on base. Sawamura's bunt gets Haruichi to second base and brings up the lead-off batter, Kuramochi. Kuramochi makes it to first base, ushering Haruichi to third. Following Kuramochi, Ryosuke squeezes and the team gets two runs from Haruichi and Kuramochi. In the end, Seidou wins 7-2. Regardless, Yeung is happy that he finally got to play the style of Japanese baseball he loved in his last summer of play.
31	"Dark Horse"; Transliteration: "Dāku Hōsu" (Japanese: ダークホース)	Makoto Fuchigami	Takahiro Udagawa	May 11, 2014
After winning their match, Seidou stays behind to watch Manaka's pitching in hopes of gaining a slight advantage in the quarterfinal game. Tanba remembers his past ties with Manaka and swears to return in that quarterfinal match. However Yakushi has made many changes to their lineup, including three first years in the 3, 4, and 5 spots. When the first of these first years arrives, Raichi Todoroki, he nails Manaka's best fastball out of the stadium to give his team the early 1-0 lead. Ichidai is forced to make an early pitching change, with Manaka moving to the outfield, and the game becomes a slugging contest. As inning 5 approaches, Manaka demands to return to the mound so his team can move on to the quarterfinals. Ichidai gives in, and Manaka returns with better control than before.
32	"Summers"; Transliteration: "Sorezore no Natsu" (Japanese: それぞれの夏)	Tomoya Tanaka	Kenji Konuta	May 18, 2014
Raichi returns to the batters box for a second match against Manaka. While Manaka gets some good pitches in and appears to have the advantage, and unfortunate bounce leads to an injury to Manaka. Without Manaka the team's pitching begins to struggle. The outcome of the Yakushi/Ichidai game shocks the members of Seidou as Raichi's hits decide the outcome. Now Seidou must prepare for a team they have no advance data on, out of having watched one match. As Seidou's first years attempt to make their way back to the bus, they come across Raichi and Raizou in the back practicing. When Raizou says there are no other pitchers that Raichi needs to worry about until they face Narumiya Mei, it gets Sawamura and Furuya's blood boiling. Kominato tells the rest of the team what happened the next day when they see Sawamura and Furuya practicing so hard, it gets the team's entire blood boiling. Tanba asks the cleanup batters to help him get ready for the next game in simulation practices as Seidou's preparations start to go to work.
33	"Money Tree"; Transliteration: "Kane no Naru Ki" (Japanese: 金のなる木)	Jun Nakagawa	Junichi Fujisaku	May 25, 2014
The episode begins with Chris coaching the team on Yakushi's batting power and their true ace, Sanada, who comes out of the bullpen and throws a shootball. Seeing their methods, Kataoka decides to take action. Kataoka calls Sawamura, Furuya, and Kawakami into his office and tells them that Tanba isn't ready to pitch in the next game. Instead he decides they will go with Furuya for innings 1-3, Sawamura for 4-6, and Kawakami for 7-9. After he leaves them he approaches Tanba and tells him to start getting ready in the bullpen in inning 5 and that he will likely play in the game. As game day arrives the entire Seidou team stares down Yakushi, mostly focusing their stares on Raichi Todoroki. When the lineups are revealed though, coach Raizou Todoroki has made some adjustments. Raichi has been moved and is now the first batter.
34	"Reliable Teammates"; Transliteration: "Tayoreru Senpai-tachi" (Japanese: 頼れる先輩達)	Mitsutaka Noshitani	Junichi Fujisaku	June 1, 2014
Raichi faces Furuya and manages to get a double. The next batter hits a single allowing Raichi to score and give Yakushi a 1-0 lead. Miyuki quickly reminds Furuya that he has reliable teammates behind him, and after a marvelous caught steal on Yakushi, Miyuki gives Seidou the confidence it needs. Seidou responds in the bottom of the first, and thanks to a 2-run homer by Masuko, Seidou takes a 3-1 lead. Seeing that his careful planning won't be enough, Raizou prepares to insert Sanada in the lineup earlier than usual and plans to have Raichi crush Furuya on his second at bat.
35	"Potential"; Transliteration: "Potential" (Japanese: ポテンシャル)	Akira Mano	Takahiro Udagawa	June 8, 2014
Furuya comes up to bat in the 7-spot and hits a solo homerun to make it 4-1 in the top of the 3rd. In the bottom of the third inning Coach Kataoka decides to make his move and bring in Sawamura while Furuya moves out to left field. At first Sawamura pitches the ball straight down the middle, but a throwback from Miyuki makes Sawamura remember it is a team game and not a one-on-one contest. Sawamura is able to trick Raichi and get him behind with some outside pitches into a 1-2 count. Finally Sawamura unleashes his 4-seam fastball to the inside and gets Raichi to pop out. As Seidou comes to bat in the top of the fourth a double from the captain gives them a 5-1 lead. Seeing that they can't fall behind any more, Raizou calls for a pitches change and brings in Sanada.
36	"The Ace Walks On"; Transliteration: "Ace Toujou" (Japanese: エース登場)	Makoto Fuchigami	Kenji Konuta	June 15, 2014
Sanada comes on and reveals he has a dangerous cutter, shutting down Seidou's batting strength. Chris tries to figure out why Sanada isn't being used from the start of games. Ichidai players continue to slowly join in and are shocked to see that Seidou has shut down Yakushi so far and leads 5-1. Tanba starts warming up in the 5th inning in the bullpen, giving Seidou an additional threat. Yakushi's batters are unable to figure out the timing of Sawamura's pitch. Seeing no other choice, Raizou recommends they each get two strikes to get used to the speed of his pitch before swinging. The #8 man gets on base. Then the #9 batter calls for a bunt, the first bunt Yakushi has made in the tournament. Raichi now comes up for his third at bat. A homerun will make it 5-3 and could ruin Seidou's momentum. People in the stands begin to wonder if Sawamura will be switched out. As Raichi comes to bat, a mysterious foot comes out of the dugout. Is Sawamura's day over?
37	"Burst!"; Transliteration: "Burst!" (Japanese: バースト！)	Mitsuko Ōya	Daishirō Tanimura	June 29, 2014
Sawamura is given the role of pitching one more inning. After two outside pitches to Raichi, Sawamura finds himself up in the count. Miyuki calls for a high, inside four-seam fastball to get Raichi out, but Raichi sends it out of the park and cuts the lead down to 5–3. After walking the next two batters, Sawamura is pulled from the game. Yakushi's batters manage to connect with Kawakami's pitches and score one more run. However a dramatic catch by Masuko leads to a dramatic double play and Seidou gets out of the inning with a 5–4 lead. Sanada is asked to continue through the end game to give Yakushi a fighting chance. In the bullpen Tanba continues to warm up, and Miyauchi thinks to himself that it is the best Tanba has pitched since getting back.
38	"Roles"; Transliteration: "Sorezore no Yakuwari" (Japanese: それぞれの役割)	Jun Nakagawa	Daishirō Tanimura	July 6, 2014
After the captain hits a home run off Sanada, Seidou once again leads by two runs. They reach the bottom of the eighth inning, and Kawakami is struggling. He insists on connecting to Tanba in the next game, but when Raichi is walked and manages to steal second base he finds himself in a pinch. Kawakami is able to get two outs, but Raichi scores, making it 6-5, and Yakushi has runners on first and third. Kataoka steps up and calls for a pitching change. In comes Tanba with two outs for his first appearance for an ace vs. ace showdown.
39	"Expectations of an Ace"; Transliteration: "Kitai o Seotte" (Japanese: 期待を背負って)	Shū Watanabe	Takahiro Udagawa	July 13, 2014
Tanba takes to the mound. After two fastballs Tanba has an 0–2 count lead. Miyuki calls for a curveball, but the curve proves to be low and inside, coming close to a passed ball. Miyuki makes a dramatic save, keeping the one-run lead for Seidou. Seeing that Tanba had the pitch, even though he did not have the control, Miyuki calls for another curve and gets Sanada to strike out. In the top half of the ninth Seidou manages to score two runs, going up 8-5. After Furuya grounds into a double play, Kataoka decides to gamble. Furuya is pulled from the game. Tanba is left to face the bottom of the order with a 3-run lead. If even one runner gets on board though, Tanba will have to face off with Raichi. Will Tanba manage to hold on?
40	"The Winning Shot"; Transliteration: "Winning Shot" (Japanese: ウィニングショット)	Tomoya Tanaka	Kenji Konuta	July 20, 2014
The top of the ninth takes place as the battle between Seidou and Yakushi reaches its climax with a battle between Tanba and Raichi. Tanba makes the count 2-2 when Miyuki finally calls for the forkball to make its debut. Will Raichi have success against the forkball, or will the pressure get to him? The winner advances to the semifinals as the loser ponders how they can improve for next season.
41	"It's the Semifinal"; Transliteration: "Iza, Junkesshou" (Japanese: いざ、準決勝)	Tatsuya Shiraishi	Junichi Fujisaku	July 27, 2014
The results of the quarterfinals are shown. Seidou learns they will be facing a giant who is a curve ball specialist in the semifinals. Furuya is informed he won't pitch in the semifinal. Instead they hope he recovers from his fatigue. The team only has one day to prepare for the semifinal match. In an effort to help the team advance, the seniors raise the mound and the coach acts as the pitcher for a special batting practice. As the morning of gameday arrives, one of Seidou's players accidentally shaves his head bald. Sawamura also learns his friends from home will be attending the semifinal to root for him. Meanwhile Haruchi's brother reveals only 18 players can move on to nationals, and he reveals if he doesn't make it to nationals, he will retire from baseball.
42	"The Giant Looks Down"; Transliteration: "Sobieru Dai Kyojin" (Japanese: そびえる大巨人)	Yoshito Hata	Daishirō Tanimura	August 3, 2014
The battle between Sensen and Seidou gets underway. Sawamura's friends arrive in the fourth inning to see that Seidou trails 1–0. In the fourth Seidou begins to make contact with Hino's curve ball. Seidou manages to load the bases, but a dramatic double play fly out, tag out at home keeps Seishun locked at zero. As we reach the sixth inning Ryousan gets on base. Haruchi is told to start warming up his batting skills, and Sawamura is told to warm up in the bullpen. Ryousan manages to steal home on a ground ball to third, tying the score at 1 a piece.
43	"Revenge"; Transliteration: "Revenge" (Japanese: リベンジ)	Makoto Fuchigami	Takahiro Udagawa	August 10, 2014
Haruchi replaces Tanba in the batting lineup with the bases loaded in a 1-1 game in the top of the sixth. Haruchi falls behind 0-2, but Hino gets greedy and throws a curve ball which Haruchi smacks into left center field for a 3-RBI double, giving Seidou a 4–1 lead. Sawamura replaces Tanba as the pitcher and walks the leadoff batter. A quick short field hit gets over Ryousan's head, giving Sensen two runners on. Seidou sacrifices a run, making it 4-2, to get the first out, but now Hino comes to the plate with runners and second and third and only one out. After a quirky relay message is sent to Sawamura, all the players relax and Sawamura vows he will never let Miyuki say some words to him again that were shared after the last game.
44	"Best Pitch"; Transliteration: "Kimedama" (Japanese: 決め球)	Mihiro Yamaguchi	Junichi Fujisaku	August 17, 2014
Sawamura faces off with Hino in a match-up that come determine the end result of the game. In the showdown Sawamura develops a new pitch, the crossfire pitch. Seidou advances with an 8-3 win after Nori gives up an additional run. Sawamura gets to meet briefly with his friends before the team heads inside to watch the other semifinal match.
45	"Pitching of Despair"; Transliteration: "Zetsubou o Yobu Toukyuu" (Japanese: 絶望を呼ぶ投球)	Akira Mano	Kenji Konuta	August 24, 2014
The second semifinal takes place as Inashiro Vocational battles a surprise dark horse in Sakurazawa High. Sakurazawa had 20 consecutive seasons of first round exits until some surprise first years arrived. Inamooto Masaaki, Hitokoro Yoshimi, and Nagao Akira arrived. Akira brought in the same enthusiasm as Sawamura, but while his pitch looked super slow, the erratic pattern confused many players. Masaaki surprises everyone by getting the top of Inashiro's order out with his knuckle ball, but when Mei takes the mound and strikes out the side Sakurazawa begins to realize how little a chance they have of advancing.
46	"Fantasy"; Transliteration: "Yume Monogatari" (Japanese: 夢物語)	Mitsuko Ōya	Takahiro Udagawa	August 31, 2014
The pitching duel between Nagao Akira and Narumiya Mei continues with neither team able to consistently get on base. Akira begins to lose his calm when Inashiro's batters begin to figure out his knuckle ball. Unfortunately it's right as Inashiro's cleanup batter, Harada, arrives. A home run gives Inashiro the lead, leading to an 8-run fourth inning, and Mei continues to strike out the side as Inashiro easily advances to the finals with a called game 11-0 after 5.
47	"That Summer"; Transliteration: " ... Ano Natsu" (Japanese: ...あの夏)	Jun Nakagawa	Junichi Fujisaku	September 7, 2014
Despite seeing Mei's pitching, Sawamura declares that they will be the ones to advance to Nationals. When the first years need to use the restroom after the match, Kazuya decides to escort them so they won't get lost like usual. While waiting for the first years to finish, Kazuya and Mei meet face-to-face, and we learn that Mei had tried to recruit Kazuya to Inashiro to form the strongest team in the nation. Instead of joining them, Kazuya vowed to beat them and form the strongest team elsewhere.
48	"At the Dorm..."; Transliteration: "Ryou nite..." (Japanese: 寮にて....)	Mitsutaka Noshitani	Junichi Fujisaku	September 14, 2014
Seidou returns to their dorms where each player comes up with his own conditioning and training to take place over the three days leading up to the championship.
49	"A Nostalgic Face"; Transliteration: "Natsukashii Kao" (Japanese: 懐かしい顔)	Tomoya Tanaka	Kenji Konuta	September 21, 2014
Kiyokuni Azuma returns to force Seidou into some fielding practice against strong hitters. Little does he know that a rematch with Sawamura is on the horizon, and Azuma comes to realize that this version of Seidou could be the strongest in the history of the school.
50	"Footsteps to Tomorrow"; Transliteration: "Asu e no Ashiato" (Japanese: 明日への足跡)	Tatsuya Shiraishi	Daishirō Tanimura	September 28, 2014
After the intense practice with Azuma, the coach sends the first years off the field and forces the infielders into their own brutal training with him. Rei Takashima takes this opportunity to teach the first years and Kawakami what the third years were like in their first season at Seidou. At the end of the episode the starting lineups for the game against Inashiro are revealed.
51	"The Battle Begins!"; Transliteration: "Kessen Kaishi" (Japanese: 決戦開始!)	Shū Watanabe	Kenji Konuta	October 5, 2014
Seidou battles Inashiro for the right to go to Nationals. Mei overthinks his opening battle with Kuromichi and walks him. Kuromichi steals second base standing up, a sacrifice bunt from Kominato moves him to third, and a base hit from Isashiki gives Seidou a 1-0 lead. Seeing nothing to lose, Mei decides to battle Yuuki one-on-one as the rest of Seidou watches wondering if Mei is losing it.
52	"I Don't Want to Lose"; Transliteration: "Maketakunai" (Japanese: 負けたくない)	Makoto Fuchigami	Takahiro Udagawa	October 12, 2014
Mei battles Yuuki one-one-one. Then it's time for Furuya to shine. Furuya throws his own team for a loop when he thanks them for helping him be successful. He then proceeds to strike out the side. Miyuki and Mei go head-to-head, and Mei gives Miyuki exactly what he wants in a change-up, but with no one on it turns into an easy out. Furuya comes out for the second and strikes out the clean-up and #6 batters, though Mei manages to pop out to third instead of striking out. With Furuya throwing with more control and speed than ever, Inashiro realizes they will have to change something up to be successful. It's the end of two, and Seidou leads 1-0.
53	"Change Gears"; Transliteration: "Gia Chenji" (Japanese: ギアチェンジ)	Kiyoshi Murayama	Junichi Fujisaku	October 19, 2014
After three innings the game remains close. Next up is the cleanup, Yuki, and Narumiya changes his gears. Baiting with the changeup, he strikes out Yuki with a fastball, creating momentum for Inashiro. Seidou realizes Narumiya is only going all out for Yuki, but will this lead to them having a mental blow or lead to them being more determined than ever to defeat Narumiya?
54	"Entrusted Faith and the Courage to Perform"; Transliteration: "Takusu Shinrai, Kotaeru Yuuki" (Japanese: 託す信頼、応える勇気)	Jun Nakagawa	Takahiro Udagawa	October 26, 2014
In the top of the fifth Furuya gets a hit off of Narumiya, leading to a chance to tie the game with Shirasu. The only problem- Shirasu bats ninth. Will Shirasu make it on base, and what will Inashiro do when Tanba takes the mound in the bottom of the fifth?
55	"Strong Men"; Transliteration: "Tsuyoi Otoko" (Japanese: 強い男)	Mitsuko Ōya	Junichi Fujisaku	November 2, 2014
Inashiro manages to load the bases with two outs against Tanba, but Tanba pulls through to get Seidou going. To counter Seidou's potential momentum Narumiya and Harada change their pitching pattern frequently, confusing Seidou's batters. As the innings change and the Seidou players walk out to the field, Kuramochi stops Ryosuke to ask him about his injury and whether or not he can go on.
56	"Decision"; Transliteration: "Ketsudan" (Japanese: 決断)	Akira Mano	Kenji Konuta	November 9, 2014
Inashiro continues to get hits off of Tanba and put Seidou in tight spots. Most of the spectators think the game is all but decided. In the bottom of the seventh Tanba's leg begins to cramp. Feeling there is no other possibility if they are to have a chance to win, Coach Kataoka puts Sawamura out on the mound to face off with Narumiya!
57	"Reliable Underclassmen"; Transliteration: "Tanomoshii Kouhai-tachi" (Japanese: 頼もしい後輩達)	Tomoya Tanaka	Takahiro Udagawa	November 23, 2014
As Seidou's players continue to get confused by Narumiya's pitches, Coach Katoka comes up with a dangerous plan. He tells his batters to give up on the change-up. Seidou begins their rally with the underclassmen. Furuya gets on base, Eijun moves him to second, and Kuramochi gets on bringing Ryosuke to bat. Inashiro's defense begins to shift for the threat, but they are all shocked when Ryousuke asks Katoka to replace with a pinch hitter.
58	"The Three-Hole"; Transliteration: "Mae o Utsu Otoko" (Japanese: 前を打つ男)	Tatsuya Shiraishi	Junichi Fujisaku	November 30, 2014
Haruichi replaces his brother to bat and gets on base, scoring Furuya. Narumiya then walks Isashiki to load the bases. Yuki. comes to bat with a chance to change the game with one swing, but with Narumiya going all out against him everyone realizes this could decide the game.
59	"Fearless"; Transliteration: "Kowai Mono Shirazu" (Japanese: 怖いもの知らず)	Kiyoshi Murayama	Kenji Konuta	December 7, 2014
Yuki and Narumiya faceoff to determine who has the superior strength in what could be the game's final determining showdown. Will Seidou be able to take their first lead and change the pace of the game?
60	"Lonely Sun"; Transliteration: "Kodokuna Taiyō" (Japanese: 孤独な太陽)	Shū Watanabe	Takahiro Udagawa	December 14, 2014
After giving up the lead, Narumiya remembers how he cost Inashiro's at last year's Koshien. With renewed confidence, Narumiya decides to show Seidou what a true ace is composed of.
61	"Determined"; Transliteration: "Shūnen" (Japanese: 執念)	Tomoko Hiramuki	Junichi Fujisaku	December 21, 2014
After shutting down Seidou, Inashiro decides to go all out and put the pressure on Eijun. Eijun continues to get out most of Inashiro's batters, but when the top of the order comes around Eijun participates in an event that could cost his team the game.
62	"Victory or Defeat"; Transliteration: "Tennōzan" (Japanese: 天王山)	Akira Mano	Kenji Konuta	December 28, 2014
A hit batter shakes Eijun's confidence, and he begins to walk Inashiro's hitters. Coach Katoka and Miyuki realize Eijun is in no condition to continue, and Kawakami is sent to the mound. Kawakami gets down to the final out. Which team will triumph, and which team will face defeat?
63	"Lingering Feelings"; Transliteration: "Zankyō" (Japanese: 残響)	Mitsuko Ōya	Kenji Konuta	December 28, 2014
The long 2 hours and 53 minutes of desperate struggles ends. Inashiro celebrates their victory, while Seidou laments for their loss. Seidou thanks their fans for supporting them, but in the bus the third years let their true feelings finally be shown.
64	"Restart"; Transliteration: "Risutāto" (Japanese: リスタート)	Tomoya Tanaka	Junichi Fujisaku	January 11, 2015
Sawamura and Furuya try to move on from the loss, but Kawakami struggles. Only a few weeks are left before the spring tournament. The seniors are forced to retire and focus on their studies. Miyuki is chosen as the new captain, with Kuramochi and Maezono as the new vice-captains. Kataoka submits his resignation, but asks to stay on until the seniors graduate.
65	"In The Sun"; Transliteration: "Hi no Ataru Basho" (Japanese: 日の当たる場所)	Jun Nakagawa	Takahiro Udagawa	January 18, 2015
Seidou begins practice games to get their new roster made before the spring tournament. Inashiro shuts down their opposition and reaches the Koshien finals, only having given up runs to Seidou. The upperclassmen try to ignore what is going on with Inashiro to avoid getting more depressed.
66	"Outsider"; Transliteration: "Yosomono" (Japanese: よそ者)	Mitsutaka Noshitani	Kenji Konuta	January 25, 2015
Inashiro loses by 1 at the Koshien Finals, but the game still doesn't deliver the excitement of the Seidou vs Inashiro showdown. At Seidou, Hiromitsu Ochiai observes many of their practices before approaching Coach Katoka. Many players begin to wonder who this gentleman is and if he could possibly be a spy.
67	"The Kick"; Transliteration: "Happun Zairyou" (Japanese: 発奮材料)	Tatsuya Shiraishi	Junichi Fujisaku	February 1, 2015
Only two games remain before the final drawings for the spring tournament will occur, but when Yakushi calls Coach Katoka and asks for a practice game, Katoka realizes he needs to make his team realize how far they need to grow if they are to have any chance of winning the spring tournament. An unexpected double header is made for the final day of practice games.
68	"The Ace Title"; Transliteration: "Ace no Za" (Japanese: エースの座)	Makoto Fuchigami	Takahiro Udagawa	February 8, 2015
Yakushi and Seidou battle again, this time in a practice game. Furuya strikes Raichi out to hold Yakushi scoreless. Sawamura gets impatient and asks permission from Kataoka to pitch, but Kataoka declines, calling Sawamura a relief pitcher and admitting that this game will determine whom the team's ace will be for the spring.
69	"Can't Lose!"; Transliteration: "Makerannee!" (Japanese: 負けらんねぇ!)	Tomoya Tanaka	Kenji Konuta	February 15, 2015
After pitching 5 innings instead of three, Furuya is sent to left field and Sawamura is brought in to pitch. Sawamura has his regular amount of power but he appears to have lost what little control he had. Katoka and Miyuki realize that Eijun has the yips.
70	"Next Stage"	Shū Watanabe	Junichi Fujisaku	February 22, 2015
Sawamura concedes 3 runs and gets 0 outs, giving the lead up to Yakushi. Sawamura begins to feel he will never be able to pitch again and wonders what has happened to his control and his confidence.
71	"September Sky"; Transliteration: "9-gatsu no Sora no Shita" (Japanese: 9月の空の下)	Tomoko Hiramuki	Takahiro Udagawa	March 1, 2015
Instead of letting Sawamura pitch with the ball, Katoka sends him out to another field to focus on running during their practices. Sawamura continues to act like a zombie and a hindrance to the team. Miyuki, Haruichi, and many of Sawamura's friends from the team have the faith that he will return, but instead of trying to figure out how they can help him, they focus on strengthening their own chances of being on the spring tourney roster.
72	"The Final Lesson"; Transliteration: "Saigo no Oshie" (Japanese: 最後の教え)	Mitsutaka Noshitani	Kenji Konuta	March 8, 2015
Miyuki continues to watch Sawamura fall into a state of endless depression. He approaches Chris with a solution and asks Chris to present it to Sawamura. Chris agrees and teaches Sawamura how to pitch low and outside, giving him a new weapon that will drive batters crazy if used correctly.
73	"Inheritance"; Transliteration: "Keishō" (Japanese: 継承)	Jun Nakagawa	Takahiro Udagawa	March 15, 2015
Yuki learns of Kataoka's pending resignation and shares the news with the third years. The third years come up with a plan that could change Kataoka's mind, if executed correctly. As Kataoka puts the team through the newest version of hell week, Maezono gives words of wisdom to the players who are slacking. Miyuki is impressed with how dependable Maezono has become and wonders why Coach Kataoka seems to be keeping a secret.
74	"Guiding Light"; Transliteration: "Michishirube" (Japanese: 道しるべ)	Mitsuko Ōya	Junichi Fujisaku	March 22, 2015
The seniors convince Coach Kataoka to let them have their graduation game before the upcoming tournament and before the tourney drawings take place. Kataoka asks them if they are just impatient, but Yuki tells him this final game is the only way to give the new team the strength they will need to move on. Kataoka realizes the seniors have one final lesson to share, and the game begins. Sawamura wonders if he will be able to pitch.
75	"In Pursuit"; Transliteration: "Sono Basho o Mezashite" (Japanese: その場所を目指して―)	Tatsuya Shiraishi	Kenji Konuta	March 29, 2015
The game remains close at 3-1. In the bottom of the eighth, the 1st and 2nd year players manage to tie the game up. Miyuki brings in Sawamura to play in the ninth inning. Sawamura's first opponent ends up being none other than the subbing in Chris. Sawamura pitches to his best ability as a thanks to Chris for teaching him all he knows. Two teams remain tied at 3 at the end of ninth. Kataoka calls for the game to continue until all the seniors have played, allowing Sawamura the chance to master his new pitch during the seniors final game.
