= Ace of Diamond =

Japanese manga series and its adaptations

- First tankōbon volume cover, featuring Eijun Sawamura

ダイヤのA (Daiya no Ēsu)
- Genre: Sports
- Manga
- Written by: Yuji Terajima
- Published by: Kodansha
- English publisher: NA: Kodansha USA (digital); Mad Cave Studios (print)
- Imprint: Shōnen Magazine Comics
- Magazine: Weekly Shōnen Magazine
- Original run: 17 May 2006 – 14 January 2015
- Volumes: 47
Further information
Anime television series
Directed by	Mitsuyuki Masuhara
Written by	Kenji Konuta
Music by	Frying-Pan
Studio	Madhouse; Production I.G
Licensed by	Crunchyroll
Original network	TXN (TV Tokyo)
English network	PH: Yey!
Original run	3 October 2013 – 28 March 2016
Episodes	126 + 5 OVA
Manga
Ace of Diamond Act II
Written by	Yuji Terajima
Published by	Kodansha
English publisher	Kodansha (digital)
Imprint	Shōnen Magazine Comics
Magazine	Weekly Shōnen Magazine
Original run	19 August 2015 – 26 October 2022
Volumes	34
Anime television series
Ace of Diamond Act II
Directed by	Mitsuyuki Masuhara (S1); Hideaki Ōba (S2)
Written by	Kenji Konuta
Music by	Hajime Hyakkoku
Studio	Madhouse (S1); OLM Team Yoshioka (S2)
Licensed by	Crunchyroll; SA/SEA: Muse Communication (S2)
Original network	TXN (TV Tokyo)
Original run	2 April 2019 – present
Episodes	53
Manga
Cat of Diamond
Written by	Yuki Okada
Published by	Kodansha
Magazine	Magazine Pocket
Original run	12 January 2022 – 30 November 2022
Volumes	3
Manga
Ace of the Diamond Act II Side Story: Teito vs Ugumori
Written by	Yuji Terajima
Published by	Kodansha
English publisher	Kodansha (digital)
Imprint	Shōnen Magazine Comics
Magazine	Weekly Shōnen Magazine
Original run	25 December 2024 – 5 March 2025
Volumes	1
- icon

Ace of Diamond (Japanese: ダイヤのA, Hepburn: Daiya no Ēsu) is a Japanese baseball-themed manga series written and illustrated by Yuji Terajima. It was serialized in Kodansha's shōnen manga magazine Weekly Shōnen Magazine from May 2006 to January 2015, with its chapters collected in 47 tankōbon volumes. A sequel titled Ace of Diamond Act II was serialized from August 2015 to October 2022, with its chapters collected in 34 tankōbon volumes.

A 126-episode anime television series adaptation, animated by Madhouse and Production I.G, aired from October 2013 to March 2016. A 52-episode anime television series adaptation of Ace of Diamond Act II, animated by Madhouse, aired from April 2019 to March 2020; a second season, animated by OLM, airs in two split cours, with the first cours airing from April to June 2026, and the second cours premiering in October of the same year.

By July 2025 the manga had over 45 million copies in circulation. In 2008, Ace of Diamond received the 53rd Shogakukan Manga Award for the shōnen category. In 2010, it won the 34th Kodansha Manga Award for best shōnen manga.

== Plot ==
The series follows Eijun Sawamura, a baseball pitcher with an unusual pitching style that naturally causes the ball to move unpredictably at the plate. Sawamura plans to go with his friends to a local high school and play baseball to the best of their abilities. However, one scout from the prestigious Seido High School approaches him and offers him a scholarship and a chance to make it to the nationals. Sawamura decides to pay a visit to the school, and it changes his entire outlook on the future. Seido and their main rivals attempt to help the upperclassmen make it to nationals during the summer tournament. Once the summer tournament ends, the upperclassmen will be forced to retire, but Sawamura will help them to success, despite his lack of control. Some time later, Sawamura and his teammates, Furuya Satoru, Kominato Haruichi and Miyuki Kazuya, lead a new team, along with a few returning faces, through the fall tournament. Their overly ambitious goal is to go to nationals during the fall tournament and convince Coach Kataoka that he does not have to resign.

Ace of Diamond Act II continues to follow Sawamura and the team as they prepare to compete for the summer tournament. With a new year, new faces appear and join the Seido baseball club. Sawamura and Furuya compete with national level teams, being able to identify their own strengths and weaknesses and further mature their pitching style, all the while they are competing with each other to earn the title. Simultaneously, the Seido batters are improving themselves to become as fearsome as the batting talent of their previous year's first-string team. With all of these preparations, Seido is aiming to win the summer tournament before the upperclassman have to graduate.

== Media ==
=== Manga ===
Written and illustrated by Yuji Terajima, Ace of Diamond was serialized in Kodansha's Weekly Shōnen Magazine from 17 May 2006 (Note: The series started in the magazine's 24th issue of 2006 (cover date 31 May), released on 17 May of the same year.) to 14 January 2015. Kodansha collected the chapters into 47 tankōbon volumes, published from 15 September 2006 to 17 August 2015.

A sequel manga, titled Ace of Diamond Act II was serialized in the same magazine from 19 August 2015 to 26 October 2022. Kodansha collected its chapters in 34 tankōbon volumes, released from 17 November 2015 to 17 May 2023.

Kodansha USA has licensed the series for a digital release in English, with the first volume published on 7 March 2017. Kodansha started publishing Ace of the Diamond Act II on its K Manga digital service in May 2023. In August 2026, Mad Cave Studios announced that it would release Ace of Diamond in a 3-in-1 volume omnibus edition through its Nakama Press imprint, with the first volume set to release on 23 March 2027.

==== Spin-offs ====
A comedic spin-off, titled Daiya no B!, about the same characters, at the same school, but in a brass high school band, was published on Kodansha's Magazine Pocket web platform from 2015 to 2016. It was collected in three volumes, released from 17 November 2015 to 17 August 2016.

Another spin-off manga, titled Cat of Diamond, by Terajima's wife Yuki Okada, was serialized on Magazine Pocket app and website from 12 January to 30 November 2022. Its chapters were collected in three volumes, released from 17 June 2022 to 17 February 2023.

A short side story to Ace of Diamond Act II, subtitled Teito vs Ugumori, was serialized in Weekly Shōnen Magazine for ten consecutive weeks from 25 December 2024 to 5 March 2025. Kodansha simultaneously published the manga in English on its K Manga digital service. The collected volume was released on 16 May 2025.

=== Anime ===
==== Ace of Diamond ====
The TV series was produced by Madhouse and Production I.G and began airing on 6 October 2013 on TX Network stations and later on AT-X. The episodes were simulcast in the US, Canada, UK, Ireland, Australia, New Zealand, South Africa, Denmark, Finland, Iceland, the Netherlands, Norway, Sweden, Central and South America, Spain, Brazil, and Portugal by Crunchyroll with English and German subtitles. The series was initially planned to be 52 episodes but was extended and ended in March 2015. A second season started airing soon after on 6 April 2015 on TX Network stations and later on AT-X. Like its predecessor the episodes were simulcast in the aforementioned countries by Crunchyroll with English and German subtitles. Two original animation DVDs were bundled with the fourth and fifth volumes of the Ace of Diamond Act II manga; the first was released on 15 July 2016 and the second was released on 16 September 2016.

==== Ace of Diamond Act II ====
An anime adaptation of Ace of Diamond Act II was announced in November 2018. The cast and staff reprised their roles from the previous series, with Madhouse returning for animation production. The series was broadcast for 52 episodes from 2 April 2019 to 31 March 2020.

In May 2024, it was announced that the series would receive a sequel. The second season of Ace of Diamond Act II airs in two split cours, with the first cours airing from 5 April to 28 June 2026 on TV Tokyo and its affiliates, and the second cours premiering on October 11 of the same year. The second season is animated by OLM, with Hideaki Ōba serving as the new director, with Kenji Konuta returning to oversee the series scripts, Yasukazu Shōji serving as character designer, and Hajime Hyakkoku returning to compose the music. Muse Communication has licensed it in South and Southeast Asia.

== Reception ==
Ace of Diamond received the 53rd Shogakukan Manga Award for the shōnen category in 2008. It also won the 34th Kodansha Manga Award for the shōnen category in 2010.

By March 2015, the first 45 volumes of the series have sold over 22 million copies. By November 2015, the manga had over 25 million copies in print. By August 2021, the manga had over 40 million copies in print. By July 2025, it had over 45 million copies in circulation.

Ace of Diamond was the 25th best selling manga in 2011, with 1,711,607 copies sold. Nikkei Entertainment magazine published a list of top 50 manga creators by sales since January 2010, in its September 2011 issue; Yuji Terajima, the author of Ace of Diamond was ranked 20th, with 2,792,000 copies sold. It was the 27th best selling manga in 2012, with 1,685,194 copies sold. In 2013 Ace of Diamond became the 23rd best selling manga, with 2,010,045 copies sold.
