= Yuji Terajima =

Japanese manga artist (born 1974)

- Born: 10 May 1974 (age 52) Mannō, Nakatado District, Kagawa, Japan
- Areas: Writer, manga artist
- Notable works: Ace of Diamond
- Awards: 53rd Shogakukan Manga Award for shōnen manga – Daiya no Ace

Yūji Terajima (Japanese: 寺嶋 裕二, Hepburn: Terajima Yūji; born 10 May 1974) is a Japanese manga artist, born in Mannō, Kagawa. He is the writer and illustrator of the baseball manga Ace of Diamond which won the 2008 Shogakukan Manga Award in the shōnen category. In 2010, it won the 34th Kodansha Manga Award in the shōnen category.
