= Penki =

Penki may refer to:

- Penki, Perm Krai
- Penki, Vladimir Oblast
- Penki (album)
