= Gimme! Revolution =

Single by Maaya Uchida

from the album PENKI
- B-side: "Aimai☆Shaky Heart"
- Released: October 22, 2014
- Genre: J-POP
- Length: 3:55
- Label: Pony Canyon
- Songwriters: Saori Kodama; Tomoya Tabuchi
- Producer: Akihiro Tomita

Maaya Uchida singles chronology
"Soushou Innocence" (2014)	"Gimme! Revolution" (2014)	"Karappo Capsule" (2015)

Music video
- Maaya Uchida "Gimme! Revolution" Music Video on YouTube

"Gimme! Revolution" (ギミー!レボリューション) is a Japanese song performed by Maaya Uchida for the second single released on October 22, 2014. The song was used as the opening theme for the anime series Gonna be the Twin-Tail!!.

== Track listings ==
CD
No.	Title	Lyrics	Music	Arrangement	Length
1.	"Gimme! Revolution" (ギミー!レボリューション)	Saori Kodama	Tomoya Tabuchi	Yashikin	3:55
2.	"Aimai☆Shaky Heart" (アイマイ☆シェイキーハート)	y0c1e	y0c1e	R・O・N	3:53
3.	"Gimme! Revolution" (Instrumental)				3:55
4.	"Aimai☆Shaky Heart" (Instrumental)				3:52
Total length:					15:35

DVD (Limited Edition only)
No.	Title	Length
1.	"Gimme! Revolution" (MUSIC VIDEO)	4:08
2.	"Gimme! Revolution" (MAKING)
3.	"Gimme! Revolution" (OFF SHOT)

== Charts ==
Chart (2014)	Peak position
Oricon Weekly Singles Chart	12
Billboard JAPAN Hot 100	18
Billboard JAPAN Hot Animation	5
Billboard JAPAN Top Singles Sales	10

== Event ==
- 『 Maaya Party！Vol.2』 Maaya Uchida 2nd Single Release Event「Maaya Party！Vol.2」（November 1, 2014 - November 8, 2014：Tokyo, Aichi, Osaka）

== Album ==
Song	Album	Release date	Note
Gimme! Revolution	『PENKI』	December 2, 2015	1st Album
