= Drive-in Theater =

EP by Maaya Uchida
- Released: January 11, 2017
- Genre: J-POP
- Length: 25:15
- Label: Pony Canyon
- Producer: Akihiro Tomita

Maaya Uchida chronology
PENKI (2015)	Drive-in Theater (2017)	Magic Hour (2018)

Music videos
- "Maaya Uchida "Shiny drive, Moony dive" Music Video short ver." on YouTube
- "Maaya Uchida "Smiling Spiral" Music Video short ver." on YouTube

"Drive-in Theater" is Japanese voice actress and singer Maaya Uchida's 1st mini album, released on January 11, 2017.

== Mini album contents ==
CD
No.	Title	Lyrics	Music	Arrangement	Length
1.	"Shiny drive, Moony dive"	Tomoya Tabuchi	Tomoya Tabuchi	Yashikin	4:14
2.	"Moratorium Dance Floor" (モラトリアムダンスフロア)	Masayoshi Ōishi	Masayoshi Ōishi	Masayoshi Ōishi	3:48
3.	"Moment"	Mayuko Maruyama	Mayuko Maruyama	Mayuko Maruyama	4:42
4.	"5:00AM"	Maaya Uchida, akane	mochilon	mochilon, y0c1e	4:26
5.	"Crossfire" (クロスファイア)	Meeko Yamamoto	Katsuhiko Kurosu	Katsuhiko Kurosu	3:30
6.	"Smiling Spiral"	Tomoya Tabuchi	Tomoya Tabuchi	eba	4:32
Total length:					25:12

BD・DVD
No.	Title	Length
1.	"Shiny drive, Moony dive" (MUSIC VIDEO)
2.	"Shiny drive, Moony dive" (OFF SHOT)
3.	"Shiny drive, Moony dive" (MAKING)
4.	"Smiling Spiral" (MUSIC VIDEO)
5.	"Smiling Spiral" (OFF SHOT)
6.	"Smiling Spiral" (MAKING)

== Charts ==
Chart (2017)	Peak position
Oricon Weekly Albums Chart	6
Billboard JAPAN Hot Albums	8
Billboard JAPAN Top Albums Sales	6
