= Penki (album) =

PENKI

Studio album by Maaya Uchida
- Released: December 2, 2015
- Genre: J-pop
- Length: 50:52
- Label: Pony Canyon
- Producer: Akihiro Tomita

Maaya Uchida chronology
PENKI (2015)	Drive-in Theater (2017)

Music videos
- "Maaya Uchida "Gimme! Revolution" Music Video" on YouTube
- "Maaya Uchida "Karappo Capsule" Music Video" on YouTube
- "Maaya Uchida "Soushou Innocence" Music Video" on YouTube
- "Maaya Uchida "Hello, future contact!" Music Video short ver." on YouTube

Singles from PENKI
- 1. "Soushou Innocence" Released: April 23, 2014; 2. "Gimme! Revolution" Released: October 22, 2014; 3. "Karappo Capsule" Released: April 1, 2015

PENKI is Japanese voice actress and singer Maaya Uchida's first album, released on December 2, 2015.

== Track listings ==
CD
No.	Title	Lyrics	Music	Arrangement	Length
1.	"Hello, 1st contact!"	Tomoya Tabuchi	Tomoya Tabuchi	Yashikin	1:09
2.	"Gimme! Revolution" (ギミー！レボリューション)	Saori Kodama	Tomoya Tabuchi	Yashikin	3:55
3.	"Karappo Capsule" (からっぽカプセル)	Shou Watanabe	Shou Watanabe	Katsuhiko Kurosu	4:38
4.	"Craft Sweet Heart" (クラフト スイート ハート)	Shou Watanabe	Shou Watanabe	Katsuhiko Kurosu	3:27
5.	"Distorted World"	y0c1e	y0c1e	y0c1e	4:15
6.	"North Child"	Ryosuke Shigenaga	Ryosuke Shigenaga	Ryosuke Shigenaga	4:41
7.	"Soushou Innocence" (創傷イノセンス)	Chiaki Ishikawa	R・O・N	R・O・N	3:45
8.	"Winter has come"	Saori Kodama	R・O・N	R・O・N	4:10
9.	"Watashi no Stage" (わたしのステージ)	Maaya Uchida, shiori	Shinya Saito	Shinya Saito	4:14
10.	"Takanari no Solfege" (高鳴りのソルフェージュ)	Saori Kodama	y0c1e	R・O・N	4:15
11.	"Sekai ga Katachi Nakushitemo" (世界が形失くしても)	samfree, Yosuke Sawa	samfree	Ryo Takahashi	3:30
12.	"Kiniro no Yuuki" (金色の勇気)	Natsumi Watanabe	fu_mou	fu_mou	3:48
13.	"Hello, future contact!"	Tomoya Tabuchi	Tomoya Tabuchi	Yashikin	4:58
Total length:					50:52

BD・DVD
No.	Title	Length
1.	"Hello, 1st contact!" (MUSIC VIDEO)	1:09
2.	"Gimme! Revolution" (MUSIC VIDEO)	3:54
3.	"Karappo Capsule" (MUSIC VIDEO)	4:37
4.	"Soushou Innocence" (MUSIC VIDEO)	3:44
5.	"Sekai ga Katachi Nakushitemo" (MUSIC VIDEO)	3:27
6.	"Hello, future contact!" (MUSIC VIDEO)	4:58
7.	"Sekai ga Katachi Nakushitemo" (MAKING)
8.	"Hello, future/1st contact!" (MAKING)
9.	"Sekai ga Katachi Nakushitemo" (OFF SHOT)
10.	"Hello, future contact!" (OFF SHOT)

== Charts ==
Chart (2015)	Peak position
Oricon Weekly Albums Chart	6
Billboard JAPAN Hot Albums	9
Billboard JAPAN Top Albums Sales	3

== Event ==
- 『 Maaya Party！Vol.4 』 Maaya Uchida 1st Album Release Event「Maaya Party！Vol.4」（December 5, 2015 - December 12, 2015：Tokyo, Aichi, Osaka）
