= Soushou Innocence =

Single by Maaya Uchida

from the album PENKI
- B-side: "Takanari no Solfege"
- Released: April 23, 2014
- Genre: J-POP
- Length: 3:46
- Label: Pony Canyon
- Songwriters: Chiaki Ishikawa; R・O・N
- Producer: Akihiro Tomita

Maaya Uchida singles chronology
"Soushou Innocence" (2014)	"Gimme! Revolution" (2014)

Music video
- Maaya Uchida "Soushou Innocence" Music Video on YouTube

"Soushou Innocence" (創傷イノセンス, lit. Wound Innocence) is Japanese voice actress and singer Maaya Uchida's debut single, released on April 23, 2014. The titular song from the single was used as the opening theme for the anime Riddle Story of Devil.

== Track listings ==
CD
No.	Title	Lyrics	Music	Arrangement	Length
1.	"Soushou Innocence" (創傷イノセンス)	Chiaki Ishikawa	R・O・N	R・O・N	3:46
2.	"Takanari no Solfege" (高鳴りのソルフェージュ)	Saori Kodama	y0c1e	R・O・N	4:16
3.	"Soushou Innocence" (Instrumental)				3:46
4.	"Takanari no Solfege" (Instrumental)				4:13
Total length:					16:02

DVD (Limited Edition only)
No.	Title	Length
1.	"Soushou Innocence" (MUSIC VIDEO)
2.	"Soushou Innocence" (MAKING)
3.	"Soushou Innocence" (OFF SHOT)

== Charts ==
Chart (2014)	Peak position
Oricon Weekly Singles Chart	14
Billboard JAPAN Hot 100	17
Billboard JAPAN Hot Animation	6
Billboard JAPAN Top Singles Sales	11

== Event ==
- 『 Maaya Party！Vol.1 』 Maaya Uchida 1st Single Release Event「Maaya Party！Vol.1」（May 3, 2014 - May 11, 2014：Tokyo, Aichi, Osaka）

== Album ==
Song	Album	Release date	Note
Soushou Innocence	『PENKI』	December 2, 2015	1st Album
Takanari no Solfege	『PENKI』	December 2, 2015	1st Album
