= Magic Hour (Maaya Uchida album) =

Studio album by Maaya Uchida
- Released: April 25, 2018
- Genre: J-pop
- Length: 53:44
- Label: Pony Canyon
- Producer: Akihiro Tomita

Maaya Uchida chronology
Drive-in Theater (2017)	Magic Hour (2018)	You Are Here (2019)

Music videos
- "Maaya Uchida "Setsuna Ring a Bell" Music Video short ver." on YouTube
- "Maaya Uchida "Resonant Heart" Music Video" on YouTube
- "Maaya Uchida "+INTERSECT+" Music Video" on YouTube
- "Maaya Uchida "c.o.s.m.o.s" Music Video" on YouTube
- "Maaya Uchida "aventure bleu" Music Video" on YouTube

Singles from Magic Hour
- 1. "Resonant Heart" Released: May 11, 2016; 2. "+INTERSECT+" Released: June 21, 2017; 3. "c.o.s.m.o.s" Released: October 25, 2017; 4. "aventure bleu" Released: February 14, 2018

Magic Hour is Japanese voice actress and singer Maaya Uchida's second album, released on April 25, 2018.

== Track listings ==
CD
No.	Title	Lyrics	Music	Arrangement	Length
1.	"My Star is Here!!"	ZAQ	ZAQ	y0c1e	2:03
2.	"+INTERSECT+"	ZAQ	ZAQ	Takeshi Masuda	4:39
3.	"aventure bleu"	meg rock	Rasmus Faber	Rasmus Faber	3:24
4.	"Resonant Heart"	Genki Mizuno	y0c1e	Shouta Horie	4:15
5.	"Agitato"	Saori Kodama	Kentarou Sonoda	Kentarou Sonoda, Tsubasa Ito	4:12
6.	"Romantic Dancer" (ロマンティックダンサー)	5u5h1	5u5h1	5u5h1	3:38
7.	"Setsuna Ring a Bell" (セツナ Ring a Bell)	Tomoya Tabuchi	Tomoya Tabuchi	R・O・N	4:38
8.	"TickTack…Bomb"	Meeko Yamamoto	Michiru	Michiru	4:41
9.	"Symbolic View" (シンボリックビュー)	Shou Watanabe	Shou Watanabe	Shou Watanabe	3:22
10.	"magic hour"	Maaya Uchida, Katsuhiko Kurosu	Katsuhiko Kurosu	Katsuhiko Kurosu	4:54
11.	"c.o.s.m.o.s"	Shou Watanabe	Shou Watanabe	Mito	4:36
12.	"take you take me BANDWAGON"	Tomoya Tabuchi	Tomoya Tabuchi	Ryosuke Shigenaga	4:14
13.	"Step to Next Star!!"	ZAQ	ZAQ	ZAQ	5:03
Total length:					53:44

BD・DVD
No.	Title	Length
1.	"Setsuna Ring a Bell" (MUSIC VIDEO)	4:39
2.	"Setsuna Ring a Bell" (OFF SHOT)	1:42
3.	"Setsuna Ring a Bell" (MAKING)	12:48
4.	"Resonant Heart" (MUSIC VIDEO)	4:22
5.	"+INTERSECT+" (MUSIC VIDEO)	5:29
6.	"c.o.s.m.o.s" (MUSIC VIDEO)	4:38
7.	"aventure bleu" (MUSIC VIDEO)	3:29

== Charts ==
Chart (2018)	Peak position
Oricon Weekly Albums Chart	7
Billboard JAPAN Hot Albums	7
Billboard JAPAN Top Albums Sales	7
