= Photo Kano =

2012 Japanese video game

- Cover of PlayStation Portable game, featuring Haruka Niimi.

フォトカノ
- Genre: Romance
- Manga

Photo Kano: Sweet Snap
- Written by: N' Yuzuki
- Published by: ASCII Media Works
- Magazine: Dengeki Maoh
- Original run: November 27, 2011 – present
- Volumes: 3
- Video game
- Developer: Dingo; Enterbrain
- Publisher: Kadokawa Games
- Genre: Dating sim
- Platform: PlayStation Portable
- Released: February 2, 2012
- Manga

Photo Kano: Your Eyes Only
- Written by: Nylon
- Published by: Hakusensha
- Magazine: Young Animal
- Original run: February 24, 2012 – November 29, 2013
- Volumes: 4
- Manga

Photo Kano: Memorial Pictures
- Written by: Taichi Amasora
- Published by: Earth Star Entertainment
- Magazine: Comic Earth Star
- Original run: March 12, 2012 – July 12, 2013
- Volumes: 3
- Manga

Photo Kano: Happy Album
- Written by: Kaisanbutsu
- Published by: Enterbrain
- Magazine: Gianism
- Original run: March 30, 2012 – October 25, 2013
- Volumes: 2
- Manga

Photo Kano: Love Album
- Written by: Takao Hino
- Published by: Enterbrain
- Magazine: Famitsu Comic Clear
- Original run: June 22, 2012 – October 25, 2013
- Volumes: 2
- Anime television series
- Directed by: Akitoshi Yokoyama; Akira Mano (assistant)
- Produced by: Atsushi Yoshikawa; Gou Tanaka; Gorou Shinjuku; Masashi Takatori; Youhei Hayashi; Ayuri Taguchi; Masako Takayama
- Written by: Akitoshi Yokoyama
- Music by: Mina Kubota
- Studio: Madhouse
- Licensed by: AUS: Hanabee; NA: Sentai Filmworks; UK: MVM Entertainment
- Original network: TBS, MBS, CBC, BS-TBS
- English network: SEA: Animax Asia; US: Anime Network
- Original run: April 5, 2013 – June 28, 2013
- Episodes: 13
- Video game

Photo Kano Kiss
- Developer: Dingo; Enterbrain
- Publisher: Kadokawa Games
- Genre: Dating sim
- Platform: PlayStation Vita
- Released: April 25, 2013

Photo Kano (フォトカノ, Foto Kano; lit. Photo Girlfriend) is a Japanese dating sim game developed by Dingo Inc. and Enterbrain, and was released for the PlayStation Portable on February 2, 2012. Due to Enterbrain's involvement, Photo Kano is considered the spiritual successor to KimiKiss and Amagami despite having no recurring staff except for Ichirō Sugiyama who was the producer for KimiKiss. An enhanced version titled Photo Kano Kiss was released on April 25, 2013, for the PlayStation Vita. There have been five manga adaptations, and an anime television series produced by Madhouse began airing on April 5, 2013, on TBS.

== Plot ==
Kazuya Maeda is a second-year high school student who takes pictures of girls with his camera that he received from his dad. The game focuses on his romantic encounters with various girls at his school. The anime adaptation goes across each girl, following a common arc until episode 4, which serves as the branching off point for each route; each route is an episode long (except for Haruka's, which received a two-part treatment), when one is completed, the next episode reverts to a certain point in time and goes down another route.

== Characters ==
=== Main characters ===
Kazuya Maeda (前田 一也, Maeda Kazuya)
Voiced by: Nobunaga Shimazaki
Kazuya is the main protagonist of the story. He has tried and given up on many different kinds of activities including playing guitar and darts, among other things. His current hobby, sparked by the gift of his father's old digital camera, is photography.

Haruka Niimi (新見 遙佳, Nīmi Haruka)
Voiced by: Kanae Itō
Haruka is the protagonist's classmate. She is very popular among both boys and girls, has good grades and plays tennis very well. She can handle everything with ease but is not the type to show initiative herself. She is the protagonist's childhood friend; but, because he became conscious of her developing body, her beauty, as well as the gossip regarding the two of them once they reached middle school, he has distanced himself from her, much to her disappointment. Because of this, she has grown cold towards him, and even mocks him on occasion.

Hikari Sanehara (実原 氷里, Sanehara Hikari)
Voiced by: Kaori Mizuhashi
Hikari is a member of the photo club. She chooses not to take portrait shots, specializing instead in landscape/scenery and astronomy photos. She is not the type to engage in small talk and therefore is mostly seen by herself. She rarely smiles and is prone to sarcastic comments.

Aki Muroto (室戸 亜岐, Muroto Aki)
Voiced by: Mai Nakahara
Aki is a third-year student with a rather stern personality, earning her the reputation as the "Captious Student Council President". Her grades are outstanding, the best Kouga Academy has ever seen, and was formerly a member of the swim club, specifically as a diver.

Nonoka Masaki (間咲 ののか, Masaki Nonoka)
Voiced by: Chiwa Saitō
Nonoka has below average grades, is extremely athletic and has an upbeat personality that allows her to have a lot of friends of both genders. She is the ace pitcher of the softball club. Love is the last thing on her mind. She has been the protagonist's friend since middle school and has frequently given him nicknames based on his interests at the time; the one she uses most frequently is "Darts'un" from the time the protagonist tried playing darts.

Mai Sakura (早倉 舞衣, Sakura Mai)
Voiced by: Hisako Kanemoto
Mai is a classmate of the protagonist's little sister, Kanon. Her personality is on the meek and shy side. She has average grades but is rather athletic. She engaged in gymnastics during middle school but switched to rhythmic gymnastics in high school.

Rina Yunoki (柚ノ木 梨奈, Yunoki Rina)
Voiced by: Asuka Ōgame
Rina has a very gentle demeanor and is in the same school year as the protagonist. Her grades are quite good even with the careless mistakes that she often makes. She likes cooking and is the lone member of the Cooking Research Society.

Tomoe Misumi (深角 友恵, Misumi Tomoe)
Voiced by: Miyuki Sawashiro
Tomoe is a girl with a rather plain personality who easily blends into the background in the protagonist's class. Her grades are about average and she is not very athletic either. She always distances herself from her other classmates and would react timidly should anyone attempt to start a conversation with her. This shyness comes from having moved many times due to her father's work and not having been able to make fast friends as a result.

=== Supporting characters ===
Kanon Maeda (前田 果音, Maeda Kanon)
Voiced by: Mariya Ise
Kanon is the protagonist's younger stepsister. She loves to sing and dance and dreams of becoming an idol. She often poses or reenacts scenes she has seen in shōjo manga or anime. She has average grades but is athletic. She joined the tennis club since she looks up to Haruka. She is rarely seen without a smile on her face. When they were children, she promised to be her stepbrother's true little sister, but secretly feels that Kazuya is her ideal man. In the game, she has her own route after completing the seven other girls' routes.

Hiromichi Kudō (九堂 博道, Kudō Hiromichi)
Voiced by: Hikaru Midorikawa
Hiromichi is the president of the Photography Club. He pursues a wide range of photos from the female students going about their daily lives to the borderline eroticism stuff. Possibly because of this that he is thoroughly hated by every girl in the school, but he seems not to mind.

Itta Nakagawa (中川 行太, Nakagawa Itta)
Voiced by: Minoru Shiraishi
He is the diminutive Photography Club member from class 2-A, and self-proclaimed specialist of low-angle shots, hence his nickname "Low-Angle Nakagawa".

Takashi Azuma (東 孝, Azuma Takashi)
Voiced by: Nobuhiko Okamoto
Another member of the Photography Club, also from class 2-A. He is rather tall and therefore his specialty is the high-angle shot, and his nickname is "Boob-Glimpse Azuma".

Yuko Uchida (内田 有子, Uchida Yūko)
Voiced by: Ayahi Takagaki
The lone female member of the club, from class 1-C, her nickname is "Stealth", because of her specialty in photographing unsuspecting subjects. Due to the mole below her left eye as well as other clues, it is hinted that she is the popular cosplayer, Alice. Rina appears to be aware of this fact but keeps it quiet at Yuko's request. Yuko and Hikari are friends of hers, even though they belong to different clubs. She is an unlockable character.

Katsumi Kurebayashi (紅林 かつみ, Kurebayashi Katsumi)
Voiced by: Kaoru Mizuhara
Katsumi was the ace of the volleyball club until she injured her ankle during her freshman year, forcing her to retire. She is now the president of the Photo Club (not to be confused with the Photography Club), which takes all of the school's official photos. Katsumi created the Photo Club because she was rejected by Hiromichi for membership in the Photography Club (likely due to disagreeing with him on the issue of erotic photography). Since her injury, she has been learning about cameras, using them to record other students' dreams while cheering them on. Her interest in photography was sparked by a senpai with an interest in photography (who was also a friend of Kudō's) who cheered her up when she was disheartened after her injury. It is not specified if the boyfriend seen after her beach volleyball match partnered with Ruu is the same person. Katsumi is loved by all of the girls involved in club activities, especially those in the sports clubs.

Ruu Narita (成田 瑠宇, Narita Ruu)
Voiced by: Akiko Hasegawa
Ruu is the up and coming star of the volleyball club. She joined Kōga Academy in order to play with Katsumi, the object of her admiration, but Katsumi was forced to retire due to injury. Disappointed but unable to erase her feelings for Katsumi, she also joined the Photo Club. She is an unlockable character in the game.

Misa Kitagawa (喜多川 美紗, Kitagawa Misa)
Voiced by: Saori Seto
Misa is the protagonist's homeroom teacher. She teaches English. She considers teaching to be her calling in life and therefore she is very thorough in guiding her students. A harsh personality coupled with being somewhat untidy result in zero happenings in her love life. Momoko Ōtani is currently under her supervision.

Momoko Ōtani (大谷 桃子, Ōtani Momoko)
Voiced by: Aya Endō
She is a student teacher who came to Kouga Academy in the new term as a math teacher. With the exception of university, she has never been to a school with boys (having always attended all-girls' schools). Since she has a rather upbeat personality, her students often call her informally, which she does not object to and therefore naturally results in her high popularity among the student body. Like Yuko and Ruu, Momoko is an unlockable character.

== Media ==
=== Video games ===
Photo Kano was developed by Dingo and Enterbrain and was distributed by Kadokawa Games. After the production team missed their initial released date on September 29, 2011 the game release was delayed until February 2, 2012, on the PlayStation Portable. It was later released as a download version on the PlayStation Network on February 29, 2012. An enhanced version titled Photo Kano Kiss for the PlayStation Vita was released on April 25, 2013, and features improved graphics and game mechanisms, alongside a new story arc.

=== Manga ===
A manga adaptation, illustrated by N' Yuzuki and titled Photo Kano: Sweet Snap, began serialization in the January 2012 issue of ASCII Media Works' Dengeki Maoh. The first tankōbon volume for Sweet Snap was released on July 27, 2012. The second adaptation, illustrated by Nylon and titled Photo Kano: Your Eyes Only, began serialization in the fifth issue of 2012 from Hakusensha's Young Animal magazine; its first volume was released on August 24, 2012. The third adaptation, illustrated by Taichi Amasora and titled Photo Kano: Memorial Pictures, began serialization the April 2012 issue of Earth Star Entertainment's Comic Earth Star magazine; its first volume was released on October 12, 2012. The fourth adaptation, illustrated by Kaisanbutsu and titled Photo Kano: Happy Album, began serialization in volume two of Enterbrain's Gianism magazine, sold on March 30, 2012. The first volume of Happy Album was released on March 25, 2013. The fifth adaptation, illustrated by Takao Hino and titled Photo Kano: Love Album, began serialization in Enterbrain's Famitsu Comic Clear on June 22, 2012. The first volume of Love Album was released on March 25, 2013.

=== Books and publications ===
Enterbrain published two volumes of a light novel series titled Photo Kano: Pentaprism Memories, written by Fumihiko Shimo and illustrated by Natsume Shimano, between March and June 2012. Enterbrain published the guide book Photo Kano Official Complete Guide on March 5, 2012. Enterbrain also published two fan books: Photo Kano Love & Happy Book on January 19, 2012, and Photo Kano Visual Works on August 31, 2012.

=== Anime ===
A 13-episode anime television series adaptation, produced by Madhouse and written and directed by Akitoshi Yokoyama, began airing on April 5, 2013. Mae Shimada is responsible for the character designs. The opening theme is "Koisuru Lens" (恋するレンズ, Koisuru Renzu; "Loving Lens") by Hayato Kaori, and the ending theme is "Smile F" (スマイルF, Sumairu Efu) by Uta Kano, composed of Kanae Itō, Mai Nakahara, Hisako Kanemoto, Kaori Mizuhashi, Chiwa Saitō, Asuka Ōgame and Miyuki Sawashiro. The anime has been licensed by Sentai Filmworks for digital and home video release in 2014.

==== Episode list ====
No.	Title	Character arc	Directed by	Written by	Original release date
1	"Meeting"; Transliteration: "Deai" (Japanese: 出会い)	Common	Akitoshi Yokoyama	Akitoshi Yokoyama	April 5, 2013
As summer vacation ends and the new semester starts, Kazuya Maeda father gives him a camera and he begins to discover the joys of photography. His childhood friend and school idol, Haruka Niimi, and another friend, Nonoka Masaki, encourage him take photos of them, and he meets his sister's friend, Mai Sakura, with whom he gets along. This brings him to the attention of the president of the Photography Club, Hiromichi Kudou. But the president of the Photo Club, Katsumi Kurebayashi, tries to convince him to join their club. In the end, Kazuya chooses the Photography Club. That evening, after meeting and exchanging a few words with another Photo Club member, Hikari Sanehara, Kazuya sees Tomoe Misumi sitting and crying at Haruka's desk in their classroom and promises her that he'll keep it a secret.
2	"School Heaven"; Transliteration: "Gakuen Tengoku" (Japanese: 学園天国)	Common	Fumio Maezono	Akitoshi Yokoyama	April 12, 2013
Having learned that Tomoe was sitting at Haruka's desk because she is envious of her, Kazuya keeps his promise. After giving Nonoka his notes for the next lesson, Kazuya has two encounters with the Student Council President, Aki Muroto, who lectures him on school rules. Later, Haruka proposes that Kazuya take pictures of her sometime and he agrees, and drags her away from the club members, Nakagawa and Azuma, who were trying to take pictures of her from embarrassing angles. Still later, Mai tells Kazuya that members of the Photography Club are banned from taking pictures of the Rhythmic gymnastic club members but asks their club president to make an exception for him. At the club meeting the following day, Kudou announces the identity of Miss Photogenic for the current school year (a club tradition for the school festival) - Haruka. Later, Kazuya catches Aki in the act of climbing over the wall to avoid being marked down as being late and promises her that he will not to tell on her or show the pictures to anyone.
3	"Profusion of Flowers"; Transliteration: "Hyakka Ryouran" (Japanese: 百花繚乱)	Common	migmi	Akitoshi Yokoyama	April 19, 2013
Kazuya experiences a couple of accidents that day: Nonoka crashes into him while rushing down a stairwell (and they share their first kiss as a result) and Nakagawa pushes Kazuya into Rina Yunoki causing him to accidentally grope her swimsuit-clad chest. Mai tells Kazuya that he has received permission from the rhythmic gymnastic club to photograph them, which Uchida overhears and passes on to the club. Then Uchida, Nakagawa and Azuma give him some "dirty" magazines as a source of inspiration, much to his discomfort. The next day, Kazuya sees Aki diving and blackmails her into allowing him to take pictures of her in her swimsuit, for which Kudou congratulates him. Later, after the photo shoot with Aki and helping Rina with her club, while on class cleaning duty with Haruka, Kazuya remembers that the Photography Club will be taking embarrassing pictures of her and he tries to think of a way to sabotage their attempts. The following day, he manages to foil their attempt, but in a rather embarrassing fashion. Since the Photography Club will not give up on their Miss Photogenic tradition, Kazuya declares to himself that he'll protect Haruka. At the end of the day, he takes some pictures of Mai.
4	"My Feelings Henceforth"; Transliteration: "Korekara no Omoi" (Japanese: これからの想い)	Common	Jun Fukuta	Akitoshi Yokoyama	April 26, 2013
The following day, Kazuya calms a frantic Kanon over a bee and later defends Kanon and Nonoka from Kaichou Aki who was scolding them for playing baseball in the hallway. He even gets her to help him with his homework. After club activities, Nakagawa asks Kazuya to return his magazines and Kazuya attempts to do so, but Haruka appears suddenly and, not wanting to get caught with contraband, Kazuya diverts her attention by walking her home. During their walk, they reminisce over the past. The next day, Kanon finds his pictures of Aki on his camera but he manages to divert her suspicions on Midou. That evening, as Kazuya tries to give Nakagawa back the magazines, Mai learns about them and he promises to do anything for her in exchange for her not telling about the magazines (which she keeps). That weekend the Photography Club hones their photography skills at a cosplay event. The following Monday, as Haruka, Hikari, Kanon, Aki, Nonoka, Mai, Rina, Tomoe, Katsumi and Ruu stretch before gym class, Kurebayashi asks Kazuya to photograph the girls and offers to give him pointers. As Kazuya snaps a shot of Uchida, he notices a mole at the corner of her eye that seems familiar.
5	"Conflict of Love"; Transliteration: "Koi no Kakechigai" (Japanese: 恋の掛け違い)	Haruka Niimi arc	Koji Sawai	Akitoshi Yokoyama	May 3, 2013
Some time later, Kazuya find Haruka has collapsed in the hall and takes her to the infirmary to rest. Seeing her like this reminds Kazuya of when they were children and how Haruka would sometimes have a similar reaction when they were playing. That evening he walks her home and she reiterates her offer to pose for him. The following day both he and Uchida overhear some girls talking about him and Haruka. The rumors going around school about them reminds him of middle school when the same thing happened, which was the cause of the distance between them. Later Kazuya overhears the ace of the Soccer Club proposing that Haruka stay away from Kazuya and date him, but she demurs. Haruka then finds out that Kazuya heard everything and tries to tell him to forget it, but he tells her that she should go for it which angers Haruka, who runs off with tears in her eyes. Both Kazuya and Haruka are upset and do not see each another for several days until Kanon shows up at the club room and asks Kazuya if he knows where Haruka is since she hasn't been attending club activities lately and isn't answering her phone. Realizing that Haruka maybe in the same situation as earlier, Kazuya rushes out to search for her, while the two Photography clubs also keep an eye for her. While searching for Haruka, Kazuya remembers scenes from their childhood as well as more recent memories and comes to realize her feelings. That evening, in the rain, Kazuya is relieved to find Haruka safe at home. The following day, the members of both Photography clubs, and some others, decide to help fix the problem. That evening, Kazuya messages Haruka and asks to meet at the "place where their memories are".
6	"Distant Thoughts"; Transliteration: "Omoi Haruka ni" (Japanese: 想いはるかに)	Haruka Niimi arc	Shinichi Masaki	Sōtarō Hayashi	May 10, 2013
Haruka shows up at the "place where their memories are" - the same playground where they played together as children. They reminisce about the fun times they had and Kazuya apologizes. When he promises to never leave her again, an overjoyed Haruka forgives him. While enjoying their renewed relationship, Kazuya asks Haruka to come visit the Photography Club's exposition at the school fair where his photos will be displayed. While playing soccer at the beach, Kazuya remembers hitting her in the chest as kids and freezes, prompting Haruka to scold him for treating her too gently. On the day of the school festival, the Photography club present Haruka with the title of "Miss Photogenic". To her surprise, their display is filled with photos of her, all taken in secret, with the exception of those taken by Kazuya. They offer to remove the photos if she wishes. A flattered Haruka declines. That evening, Kazuya finally confesses his feelings for Haruka which she accepts and they share a kiss, fulfilling a childhood promise they made to one another.
7	"A Star's Smile"; Transliteration: "Hoshi no Egao" (Japanese: 星の笑顔)	Hikari Sanehara arc	Kōichi Machida	Sōtarō Hayashi	May 17, 2013
After an encounter with Hikari Sanehara, Kazuya asks her if her can take photos of her, which she agrees to. During their session, Hikari mentions to Kazuya that she does not like to smile or have her picture taken. While discussing their photography styles, Hikari states that people smile on instinct when they see a camera, and that you cannot tell whether that smile is true or fake. This convinces Kazuya that he must get her to take pictures of people and tries numerous times to get her to laugh over the next few days, with a notable lack of success. However, after a little help of the Photography club, Kazuya finally manages to see Hikari laugh. The following day Kazuya invites Hikari out on a date to an amusement park where they enjoy themselves. Later that evening, Hikari asks Kazuya to accompany her to a special place — a viewing platform where they catch flowers glowing under the stars. Hikari then reveals why she doesn't like smiles - in middle school she associated with some popular girls but their relationship gradually turned sour and they began to bully her. She avoided their bullying as much as she could until they framed her for stealing a classmate's wallet. As a result she was scolded by her teachers and shunned by her classmates which caused her to stop trusting people. Kazuya is the first person since that time that she has felt she could open up to and smile in front of. As time passes, they continue taking pictures together and their relationship progresses and the following spring they begin to date.
8	"Look at My Bare Face"; Transliteration: "Sugao o Mitsumete" (Japanese: 素顔を見つめて)	Aki Muroto arc	Fumio Maezono	Yoshitaka Shishido	May 24, 2013
One rainy day after he took pictures of Aki Muroto, Kazuya notices her on the roof skipping classes and decides to cheer her up. He convinces her to leave the school grounds and takes her to the local arcade. While on their date, Aki tells Kazuya about herself: since childhood, she has studied hard to become a doctor like her father. She has taken extra classes, even on weekends and holidays, despite her love for swimming. Even though she quit the swim team to study more, Aki says that she's at her limit and she's "not cut out" to be Student Council President or a doctor. While Aki is convinced that she is not a great person, an older lady notices her and thanks her for saving an old man's life by arranging for him to be treated at her family's hospital. Kazuya realizes that the incident the woman is referring to occurred on the day that he took the photos of her and that she could have entered through the front gate had she not wanted to draw attention to herself. As the date ends, Kazuya realizes that the only thing holding their relationship together is his photos of her illicit entry, so he invites her on a real date. They go to an aquarium where he learns of Aki's love of dolphins. Their beautiful swimming encouraged her when she was young and now she wants Kazuya to encourage her. Kazuya helps her to come to the conclusion she needs to accept all aspects of herself and the two confess their love for each other and become a couple. Aki later rejoins the swim team and allows Kazuya to take photos of her diving. They continue dating even after Aki graduates.
9	"A Challenge Of Love"; Transliteration: "Koi no Hatashijou" (Japanese: 恋の果たし状)	Nonoka Masaki arc	Tatsufumi Itō	Sōtarō Hayashi	May 31, 2013
It starts when Kazuya joined the Photography club in spring and started helping Nonoka Masaki with her morning practices. One day, hearing that no one would model for him, Nonoka proposes to model for him if he will help her to throw risers as good as the top pitchers from other schools, to which Kazuya agrees. Since Nonoka agreed to model for him, Kazuya goes to one store to study up on his photography skills, with Nonoka tagging along. A few days later, Nonoka becomes jealous of how Kazuya gets along with Haruka after seeing how Kazuya complemented Haruka for resewing Nonoka's sports bag, even after their first kiss (seen in episode 3). So Nonoka waits for Kazuya on the roof to "challenge" him, to which he doesn't have a clue. She even confesses to him and that she wants to prove she can be the perfect girl for him, to which Kazuya accepts the challenge. So as they practice and take pictures on summer holidays, Kazuya keeps scolding Nonoka for being obvious on various occasions, like clothing and food, so they decide to do a photo session on the beach where they enjoy taking photos, until Nonoka mentions nude photography which drags attention of two guys, resulting Kazuya to protect Nonoka. As the new semester started, Nonoka realizes that if she masters her pitching, she won't be with Kazuya anymore, which makes her sad and quit her practices. Then Kazuya decides to cheer her up by making a picture of her "pitching". At the day of the school festival, Kazuya confesses his love for Nonoka and his loss in the challenge, to which Nonoka accepts. After that they become a couple.
10	"An Angel's Dance"; Transliteration: "Tenshi no Mai" (Japanese: 天使の舞い)	Mai Sakura arc	Tamaki Nakatsu; Hideki Takayama	Sōtarō Hayashi	June 7, 2013
After finding those "dirty" magazines with Kazuya, Mai Sakura begins to blackmail him into doing her favours like tasting various food for her since she's on a diet, in order to keep fit for a competition. She has him explain all the flavors and she fantasies her routine to food, that she even bites him one day. However, it does not help because she falters on the first part of her routine on the day of the qualifiers, but Kazuya gives her words of encouragement and she finishes it. Afterwards Kanon gets "sick" and convinces Kazuya to go to the pool in her place with Mai in order to cheer her up, since she did not qualify for the fall competition. Even though Kazuya is not oblivious he accepts and the date. Afterwards Kazuya realizes he is drawn to Mai because of her hard work ethic. He dedicates most of his time to improve his photography and help Mai diet. Eventually Mai returns the magazines to Kazuya, also putting a love letter addressed to him into them. One day after school, Kanon almost caught Kazuya and Mai in an inappropriate position in his room. After one day that Mai told Kazuya that she was chosen as an alternative for the team, he continues to help and cheer her up until one day they confess their love for each other and become a couple. In the end, they began to date each other and take pictures together.
11	"Wife of the Academy"; Transliteration: "Gakuen no Oyomesan" (Japanese: 学園のお嫁さん)	Rina Yunoki arc	Koji Sawai	Yoshitaka Shishido	June 14, 2013
As Kazuya finds it difficult to advertise the Cooking Research Society for Rina Yunoki's sake and not Rina herself, she's been giving her best to prepare food and gathering new members for the club till the day of the school festival and Kazuya decides to make a poster of her cooking. On one fall day, after Kazuya gets mistaken by the girls for the one from the Photography club who tried to sneak into the vaulting horse and beaten up in front of Rina, he is relieved after Rina cleared of the misunderstanding in front of them and when she asked Kazuya to help her find a four-leaf clover. When Rina spots Uchida, she insisted that the other one to help out with the cooking, to which to Uchida reluctantly agrees. After the cooking, Kazuya notices that the food Rina made doesn't look good on the camera, he tries to figure a way to make it look good while Rina keeps making new food, but all to no success. One day Kazuya decides to take Rina to a fun park since she's looking for a "change of pace", but on the next day Rina's little sister Erina tags along. While having lunch, Erina notices how close the pair are, hinting that they look like newlyweds. Then Rina comes up with a new idea of cooking a "Sunflower burger" for the recruiting poster to submit to the Student Council with Kazuya helping her. On the day of the school festival, Rina along with Kanon and Nonoka cosplay in the cafe where the popular cosplayer Alice-chan arrives to help Rina. After the festival, Rina tells Kazuya that five freshman girls came to join the Cooking Research Society club and now the club won't be disbanded, much to Rina's joy. Then Kazuya and Rina confess their love for each other and become a couple. Afterwards, Rina begins to teach new club members new stuff.
12	"Photograph Memory"; Transliteration: "Foto Gurafu Memori" (Japanese: フォトグラフメモリー)	Tomoe Misumi arc	Akira Mano; Akitoshi Yokoyama	Yoshitaka Shishido	June 21, 2013
One day, when Kazuya finds Tomoe Misumi trying making different faces in front of the river, it begins to rain and Kazuya takes Tomoe under his umbrella and escorts her to somewhere to wait for the rain to stop. There, they chat over Kazuya's relationship with Haruka. On next day after school, Tomoe drags Kazyua to one place where she gives him cupcakes as thanks for the other day. After hearing from Kazuya that her cupcakes are good, Tomoe becomes so shy that Kazuya wants to take a picture of it, but she declines, thinking that she isn't good enough for him. However Kazuya tries to reconvince her and tells her that she is pretty which makes her happy. After that, Kazuya started taking pictures of Tomoe whenever he saw her (skipping the scenes where he took the blackmail photos of Aki's swimsuit, where Nonoka clashed into him, where he helped Rina with her stuff). But one day, Tomoe tells him that she's transferring schools after the school festival due to her dad's job, and tells him to leave her alone. But Kazuya declines the idea and decides to be friends with her until after the festival, much to her joy. They decided to take more pictures in order to make good memories of her life in their school (with Haruka, Kanon, Nonoka, Rina, Katsumi, Ruu, Hikari, Aki and Mai tagging along) and outside school. Eventually, she told everyone that she'll be transferring and she became surrounded by people. As the day of the school festival came, the day of Tomoe's transferring approached, Kazuya prepared the photo album with the pictures that he made with and for Tomoe, and gave it to her by the time her train was about to leave. Thankfully, all her friends, even the Photography Club and Photo Club came to say goodbye. As the train leaves Kazuya promises Tomoe that they'll see each other soon.
13	"Loving Each Other"; Transliteration: "Omoi Ai" (Japanese: 想い合い)	Kanon Maeda arc	Toshihiro Nagao	Sōtarō Hayashi	June 28, 2013
One day, Kanon won a trip to Europe for their parents' honeymoon, so the Maeda siblings stay at home. At first Kazuya thought that it would be good with his sister, but later he becomes uneasy with it (due to the previous incidents in the first four episodes). When the Photography Club finds out about this, they insist that he must use Kanon as a photo-subject, much to his chagrin. However, Kazuya sees how much Kanon has grown up while making good pictures of her, which were complimented by Katsumi, much to Ruu's chagrin. While making photos with Kanon for her audition for a temporary idol union to celebrate a movie premiere, Kazuya makes a photo of Kanon confessing in love, which, unknown to him, is addressed to him, that makes him even more uneasy. Everything becomes more difficult for him, when Kanon returns the "dirty" magazines to Nakagawa and Azuma in an apron at their home, and when their mom tells them that their dad came down with a fever and that they are gonna stay together a little longer, so Kazuya is not sure if he should tell her that they are not blood related, meanwhile Kanon is aching for him. On Sunday, Kazuya and Kanon decided to go to the beach where they have fun, take pictures and cheer for Katsumi and Ruu at the volleyball tournament, who later lost. When Ruu tells the Maeda siblings that Katsumi has a boyfriend and that staying with her is enough for her, Kanon and Kazuya think to much about it. When Kazuya sees a sand castle that Kanon makes, he remembers the day when they first met, when he gave her that jingle-bell and made a promise to be good siblings for each other. And now looking back, they still remember it and still care for each other as siblings. After their parents return from the trip, Kazuya finally gives her the photo album of her childhood and her real mother as he promised to her father, his stepfather. Afterwards Kanon gives Kazuya a love letter and she asks that he not read it till her graduation. He shows her the opened envelope on the day of her graduation, in which she confesses her love for him. The last scene has her running into his waiting arms.

== Reception ==
Photo Kano Kiss on the PlayStation Vita sold 30,172 physical retail copies during the first week of release in Japan. By mid-May 2013, the number of retail sales rose to 46,167 copies. As of December 2015, both games have sold a combined total of 200,000 copies across the PSP and Vita platforms.
