= Dingo Inc. =

Japanese video game developer (1998–2017)

Dingo Inc. 株式会社ディンゴ
- Type: Kabushiki gaisha
- Industry: Video games
- Founded: August 14, 1998
- Defunct: March 21, 2017
- Fate: Bankruptcy
- Headquarters: Shibuya, Tokyo, Japan
- Key people: Tatsuya Shōji (Representative director)
- Number of employees: 51 (as of June 2015)
- Website: www.dingo.co.jp

Dingo Inc. (株式会社ディンゴ, Kabushiki gaisha Dingo) was a Japanese video game developer founded on August 14, 1998, in Shibuya, Tokyo, Japan. Dingo was primarily known for the Hatsune Miku: Project DIVA PlayStation Portable games.

== Games ==
- Online Striker (Microsoft Windows)
- Bleach: Hanatareshi Yabou (PS2, 2006)
- Fire Emblem: Radiant Dawn (Wii, 2007)
- Cluster Edge: Kimi wo Matsu Mirai e no Akashi (PS2, 2007)
- Chō Kōsoku Card Racer (Arcade, 2007)
- Pokémon Battrio (Arcade, 2007)
- Pictdot (2008)
- Kanji Kurouto (2008)
- Kanakuro (2008)
- Number Place (2008)
- Pokémon Battrio 2 (Arcade, 2008)
- Mr. Driller Online (XBLA, 2008)
- Oden-kun: Tanoshii Oden Mura (NDS, 2008)
- Kimo Kawa E! (NDS, 2009)
- PokéPark Wii: Pikachu's Adventure (Wii, 2009)
- Hatsune Miku: Project DIVA series
  - Hatsune Miku: Project DIVA (PSP, 2009)
  - Hatsune Miku: Project DIVA 2nd (PSP, 2010)
  - Hatsune Miku: Project DIVA Extend (PSP, 2011)
- Photo Kano series
  - Photo Kano (PSP, 2012)
  - Photo Kano Kiss AR (Vita, 2012)
  - Photo Kano Kiss (Vita, 2013)
- Shoukan × Shingeki × Monsters!! (Android, 2012)
- Hikōkai (PSP, 2013)
- Occult Maiden (Android/iOS, 2013)
- Love Live! School Idol Paradise series
  - Love Live! School Idol Paradise Vol. 1: Printemps Unit (Vita, 2014)
  - Love Live! School Idol Paradise Vol. 2: BiBi Unit (Vita, 2014)
  - Love Live! School Idol Paradise Vol. 3: Lily White Unit (Vita, 2014)
- Reco Love series
  - Reco Love: Blue Ocean (Vita, 2016)
  - Reco Love: Golden Beach (Vita, 2016)
- Ragnastrike Angels (Android/iOS, 2016)
