= Intersect (song) =

"+INTERSECT+"

Single by Maaya Uchida

from the album Magic Hour
- B-side: "Majo ni Naritai Hime to Hime ni Naritai Majo no Rhapsody feat. Uesaka Sumire"
- Released: June 21, 2017
- Genre: J-pop
- Length: 4:41
- Label: Pony Canyon
- Songwriter: ZAQ
- Producer: Akihiro Tomita

Maaya Uchida singles chronology
"Resonant Heart" (2016)	"+INTERSECT+" (2017)	"c.o.s.m.o.s" (2017)

Music video
- “+INTERSECT+” on YouTube

"Intersect" (stylized as "+INTERSECT+") is Japanese voice actress and singer Maaya Uchida's 5th single, released on June 21, 2017. The coupling song "Majo ni Naritai Hime to Hime ni Naritai Majo no Rhapsody" is a duet song with voice actress, Sumire Uesaka.

== Track listings ==
CD
No.	Title	Lyrics	Music	Arrangement	Length
1.	"+INTERSECT+"	ZAQ	ZAQ	Takeshi Masuda	4:41
2.	"Majo ni Naritai Hime to Hime ni Naritai Majo no Rhapsody feat. Uesaka Sumire" (魔女になりたい姫と姫になりたい魔女のラプソディー feat.上坂すみれ)	ZAQ	ZAQ	ZAQ	5:32
3.	"+INTERSECT+" (Instrumental)				4:41
4.	"Majo ni Naritai Hime to Hime ni Naritai Majo no Rhapsody feat. Uesaka Sumire" (Instrumental)				5:29
Total length:					20:23

DVD (Limited Edition only)
No.	Title	Length
1.	"+INTERSECT+" (MUSIC VIDEO)
2.	"+INTERSECT+" (OFF SHOT)
3.	"+INTERSECT+" (MAKING)

== Charts ==
Chart (2017)	Peak position
Oricon Weekly Singles Chart	8
Billboard JAPAN Hot 100	21
Billboard JAPAN Hot Animation	4
Billboard JAPAN Top Singles Sales	10

== Album ==
Song	Album	Release date	Note
+INTERSECT+	『Magic Hour』	April 25, 2018	2nd Album
