= Ragnastrike Angels =

Japanese media franchise

- Ragnastrike Angels Promotional Image

ラグナストライクエンジェル (Raguna Sutoraiku Enjeruzu)
- Genre: Fantasy; Action
- Anime television series
- Directed by: Junichi Wada
- Written by: Takeshi Kikuchi
- Studio: Satelight
- Original network: Tokyo MX, Tochigi TV, Gunma TV, BS11
- Original run: April 3, 2016 – June 19, 2016
- Episodes: 12
- Video game
- Developer: Dingo Inc.
- Genre: Action
- Platform: iOS, Android, PC
- Released: December 15, 2016

Ragnastrike Angels (ラグナストライクエンジェルズ, Raguna Sutoraiku Enjeruzu) is a Japanese short anime series airing on TV consisting of 12, 30-second long episodes airing from April 3 to June 19, 2016. It is based on the video game of the same name released on December 15, 2016, in Japan for iOS, Android, PC; and ended its service on December 31, 2017.

== Plot ==
The year is 2035 E.R. Giant living creatures called Fiarem have suddenly appeared on Earth.

Although mankind tries to oppose them by releasing a large number of Ectis, a type of battle android, they are undeniably inferior to face the Fiarem, which are over 50 metres or 160 feet tall and overwhelmingly powerful.

In order to overcome this situation, the Japanese Diet makes the decision to use Cell Growth Factor CGF-3 technology, which enlarges living beings, for military motives and send humans into battle as giant weapons.

Six heroines are selected as appropriate subjects for enlargement, and enter the Anti-Fiarem Specialists Unit, Ragna Strikers. These young women, trusting their bonds with the secret government agency, head into battle with their powerful enemies.

== Characters ==
=== Heroines ===
Ayano Anemori (姉守 綾乃, Anemori Ayano)
Voiced by: Tomoyo Kurosawa
Free-spirited and skilled at being spoiled. Her fault is that she's a shut-in who loves her house so much that she never wants to go outside. She has a strong sense of justice and decided to fight the Fiarem to protect the world.
She is 156.5 cm (5 ft 2 in) at her normal height and 38 metres or 125 feet in Giant Mode. Her main weapon is a blaster rifle.
Moka Mihime (美姫 もか, Mihime Moka)
Voiced by: Inori Minase
Pure and innocent, she's the team mascot and is loved by everyone in the team like a younger sister. She's aiming to become an idol and never misses a lesson. A cosplay maniac.
She is 148 cm (4 ft 10 in) at her normal height and 37.6 metres or 123 feet in Giant Mode. Her main weapon are a set of gloves.
Nagisa Nanami (那波 ナギサ, Nanami Nagisa)
Voiced by: Ayane Sakura
She may look cold but really she's a pure and innocent girl, and a late bloomer when it comes to romance. Everything she knows about love comes from books and dramas, so whenever she's alone with a guy she freaks out and ends up acting audaciously. A genius with an IQ of 200.
She is the tallest of the Ragna Strikers, being 163 cm (5 ft 4 in) at her normal height and 39.6 metres or 130 feet in Giant Mode. Her main weapon is a cannon.
Izuki Kanomiya (華ノ宮 伊月, Kanomiya Izuki)
Voiced by: Maaya Uchida
The only daughter of the famous Kanomiya family. Her actions are that of a noble lady and she thinks she always has to be the best at everything. Brimming with curiosity and able to quickly take action, she's also fascinated by the commoners' way of life.
She is 160 cm (5 ft 3 in) tall at her normal height and 38.8 metres or 127 feet in Giant Mode. Her main weapon is a sword.
Hinata Tōjō (東条 ひなた, Tōjō Hinata)
Voiced by: Mai Fuchigami
A ball of sunshine, calm and kind to anyone and everyone. She's skilled at a variety of household tasks, but she's always worrying the other members with her unique creative cuisine.
She is 157 cm (5 ft 2 in) tall at her normal height and 38.1 metres or 125 feet in Giant Mode. Her main weapons are a bow and arrows.
Kasumi Barnette Midō (御堂 かすみ バーネット, Midō Kasumi Bānetto)
Voiced by: Aoi Yūki
A former member of the military who applied to be part of the enlargement experiment but for some reason it failed and turned her into a fourteen year old girl. She hates being treated as a younger person and she frequently gets angry. Her sense of responsibility and justice is stronger than others, and she gets angry at her fellow members' slovenliness.
She is the shortest of the Ragna Strikers, being 141 cm (4 ft 8 in) at her normal height and 34.2 metres or 112 feet in Giant Mode. Her main weapon is a giant hammer.

=== Commanders ===
Rio Hiiragi (柊理緒, Hīragi Rio)
Voiced by: Mai Nakahara
The commander of the Ragna Strikers.
Erenoa Sonoda (エレノア・ソノダ)
Voiced by: Ami Koshimizu
Rio's aide, she is sloppy at her job and has a drinking problem. She is a caring person and is endeared to everyone like an older sister whom they can consult.

== Development ==
The series was made by Satelight, and was produced by Aniplex and Dingo Inc. as the original creators and DMM as distributor of the game. Voice actress Tomoyo Kurosawa as protagonist Ayano Anemori sings the theme song "Kizuna no Chikara" (絆のチカラ).

== Media ==
=== Anime ===
The anime was directed by Junichi Wada whilst the script was written by Takeshi Kikuchi with character designs by Tōru Imanishi.

==== Episode list ====
No.	Title	Original release date
1	"Chance Encounter" "Purorōgu -Kaikō-" (プロローグ ―邂逅―)	April 3, 2016
The episode starts with a starry sky with a comet flying across it and the sound of it striking the ground can be heard. Out of it rises a giant black knight looking figure in wielding a giant black lance. Ayano is then shown before speaking the word "Fiarem" as she gazes upon hundreds of these comets striking the ground, causing massive destruction. A comet then lands a few meters in front of her causing an explosion and a pendant above her ear to start glowing. She turns around to talks to an unseen figure, stating that they will meet again and that they can become one.
2	"The Sleep-inducing Kotatsu" "Madoromi no Kotatsu" (まどろみの炬燵)	April 10, 2016
The command room receives a report that a Fiarem has been spotted. In response, Rio orders the observer to contact Ayano. It then cuts to Ayano, who is half-asleep underneath her kotatsu, much to Rio's shock. Her socked feet are outside of the kotatsu, making her cold, so she tucks her feet in, but this makes her too hot. She then precedes to remove her socks with her toes which, according to her, "feels good". The observer reports to the clearly agitated Rio that she has fallen asleep.
3	"It's Nice and Warm" "Attakain desu" (あったかいんです)	April 17, 2016
Hinata arrives in Ayano's room, telling her that she needs to wake up. However, Ayano is not responding to her, causing Hinata try to wake her up by tickling her, starting a tickle fight. This, however, ends up exhausting them, causing both of them to fall asleep. In the command room, Rei orders Kasumi to go wake them both up, to which she complies.
4	"Ayano, Moving Out!" "Ayano, ikimasu!" (綾乃、いきます！)	April 24, 2016
Kasumi arrives in the command room with Ayano and Hinata, having woken them up by her by hitting them on the head. Rio tells Ayano to get ready for an emergency dispatch. Ayano moves to a platform while complaining she'd rather be home, but before she can finish the platform opens, causing her to fall. She lands in a giant bath while a device called the "Deva System" appears above her and fires a laser at her. She then emerges from the bath as a giant and stretches her body.
5	"We're Still Girls, Y'know" "Datte Onna no Ko Da Mon" (だって女の子だもん)	May 1, 2016
Ayano changes into her combat suit along with Moka and Izuki. Izuki scolts Ayano for being late, for which she apologizes. The three continue to talk while the normal sized male staff members struggle not to peep at the giant girls. Moka, being out of lip balm, asks Ayano for hers. However, as she is about to give to give it to her, the giant can of lip balm slips out of Ayano's hand and falls to the ground, causing huge chaos among the staff below her, for which she also apologizes. After they finish changing, the three girls head out and Ayano asks the people in the command room to wish them good luck.
6	"Fiarem Counterattack" "Fiaremu Geigeki-sen" (フィアレム迎撃戦)	May 8, 2016
A Fiarem terrorizes the city until Ayano arrives and kicks it in its face, causing it to crash in a nearby building. She is soon joined by Moka and Izuki. The Fiarem counterattacks by firing a laser from its eye at them. From the command room, Rio orders the three to try to keep the local damage to a minimum. Moka states that it'll be no problem just as she accidentally hits a nearby building with her elbow, destroying it, much to Rio's annoyance. Ayano then gets serious.
7	"Soldiers Need to Take Baths, Too!" "Senshi ni Datte Ofuro wa Hitsuyō Nandesu" (戦士にだってお風呂は必要なんです!)	May 15, 2016
Following the battle, the Ayano, Moka and Izuki are relaxing in a bath house. Kasumi then suddenly barges in and hits them on the head. She then reveals that the three did in fact not defeat the Fiarem but ran away. Her complains are, however, shut down by Nagisa, whom states that in order to use their powers they must form bonds with "the Spec Ops Officer". Ayano and Moka try to use this as an excuse for running away, however, Kasumi tells them that if that is the case they will try a "simulation", confusing everyone present. Meanwhile, Hinata is getting electrocuted in a galvanic bath.
8	"Nice Small Talk!!" "Naisutōku!!" (ナイストーク!!)	May 22, 2016
Ayano, Izuki, Nagisa and Kasumi are seen in a living room with Hinata in the background and Moka disguised as a stuffed animal. Kasumi starts the "simulation" by trying to have a "nice small talk". Kasumi, pretending to be "the Spec Ops Officer", introduces herself to Nagisa and tells her to give a reply. However, her reply is like something out of a romance novel. While Ayano thinks it went well, Kasumi states it didn't. Erenoa is then seen observing the "simulation" while taking bath with Rio, also thinking it went well.
9	"Achoo" "Pushī" (ぷしっ)	May 29, 2016
Kasumi continues the "simulation". Once again pretending to be the "Spec Ops Officer", she invites the others to a one on one training section. However, all of them turn down the invitation, Hinata because she doesn't want to become a giant, Izuki isn't interested and makes up an excuse, Moka just states she doesn't want to and Ayano doesn't answer at all and slips under her kotatsu, pretending to be asleep. Annoyed by this, Kasumi tells them to take the "simulation" more seriously. At that moment the alarm suddenly goes off and the TV screen in living room shows that a new Fiarem has appeared.
10	"To Protect Everything" "Subete o Mamoru Tame ni" (すべてを守るために)	June 5, 2016
In response to the appearance of the new Fiarem, all of the Ragna Strikers are sent out to face it. However, upon arrival they find that, even from their perspective, the new Fiarem is huge. Nagisa and Hinata try to hurt it but their attacks have no effect. The Fiarem then hits the ground, causing a huge shock wave that blows Ayano back. In the command room, Erenoa tells the girls to come back alive.
11	"A Sky of Despair" "Zetsubō no Sora" (絶望の空)	June 12, 2016
The Ragna Strikers continue to fight the huge Fiarem. Moka and Kasumi manage to block its attack and push it off balance. Seeing this opening, Izuki tells Nagisa and Hinata to once again attack it, actually hurting it this time. Ayano, whom is still on the ground from the Fiarem's previous attack, is told be Kasumi to get up and provide support. However, at that moment even more Fiarem start to appear, raining down from the sky like shooting stars. Meanwhile, in the command room, "the Spec Ops Officer" finally arrives.
12	"Hope -Ragnastrikers-" "Kibō" (希望)	June 19, 2016
Overwhelmed, most of the Ragna Strikers start to lose hope. Ayano, however, refuses to give up. Suddenly Ayano's hair clips start to glow. Rio then informs the girls that "the Spec Ops Officer" has arrived and that they'll be initiating the "Mind Drive", fusing his mind with theirs, making them "invincible". With this the girls begin their counterattack.

=== Video game ===
The anime is based on a 3D real-time battle action game of the same name for iOS, Android, and PC. Players assumes the role of the "Spec Ops Officer" of the girls' Ragnastrikers unit to fight the mysterious enemy Fiarem. The game was launched on December 15, 2016, as a Japan exclusive. On December 31, 2017. Ragnastrike Angels officially terminated its service.
