= Resonant Heart =

Single by Maaya Uchida

from the album Magic Hour
- B-side: "TickTack…Bomb"
- Released: May 11, 2016
- Genre: J-POP
- Length: 4:15
- Label: Pony Canyon
- Songwriters: Genki Mizuno y0c1e
- Producer: Akihiro Tomita

Maaya Uchida singles chronology
"Karappo Capsule" (2015)	"Resonant Heart" (2016)	"+INTERSECT+" (2017)

Music video
- Maaya Uchida "Resonant Heart" Music Video on YouTube

"Resonant Heart" is Japanese voice actress and singer Maaya Uchida's 4th single, released on May 11, 2016. The titular song from the single was used as the opening theme for the anime Seisen Cerberus: Ryuukoku no Fatalités.

== Track listings ==
CD
No.	Title	Lyrics	Music	Arrangement	Length
1.	"Resonant Heart"	Genki Mizuno	y0c1e	Shouta Horie	4:15
2.	"TickTack…Bomb"	Meeko Yamamoto	Michiru	Michiru	4:41
3.	"Resonant Heart" (Instrumental)				4:15
4.	"TickTack…Bomb" (Instrumental)				4:41
Total length:					17:51

DVD (Limited Edition only)
No.	Title	Length
1.	"Resonant Heart" (MUSIC VIDEO)
2.	"Resonant Heart" (OFF SHOT)
3.	"Resonant Heart" (MAKING)

== Charts ==
Chart (2016)	Peak position
Oricon Weekly Singles Chart	13
Billboard JAPAN Hot 100	26
Billboard JAPAN Hot Animation	10
Billboard JAPAN Top Singles Sales	14

== Event ==
- 『 Maaya Party！Vol.5』 Maaya Uchida 4th Single Release Event「Maaya Party！Vol.5」（May 21, 2016 - May 29, 2016：Tokyo, Aichi, Osaka）

== Album ==
Song	Album	Release date	Note
Resonant Heart	『Magic Hour』	April 25, 2018	2nd Album
TickTack...Bomb	『Magic Hour』	April 25, 2018	2nd Album
