= Aventure Bleu =

"aventure bleu"

Single by Maaya Uchida

from the album Magic Hour
- B-side: "Applause"
- Released: February 14, 2018
- Genre: J-POP
- Length: 3:23
- Label: Pony Canyon
- Songwriters: meg rock Rasmus Faber
- Producer: Akihiro Tomita

Maaya Uchida singles chronology
| "c.o.s.m.o.s" (2017) | "aventure bleu" (2018) | "youthful beautiful" (2018) |

Music video
- Maaya Uchida "aventure bleu" Music Video on YouTube

"aventure bleu" is Japanese voice actress and singer Maaya Uchida's 7th single, released on February 14, 2018. The titular song from the single was used as the opening theme for the anime Takunomi.

== Track listings ==
CD
| No. | Title | Lyrics | Music | Arrangement | Length |
|---|---|---|---|---|---|
| 1. | "aventure bleu" | meg rock | Rasmus Faber | Rasmus Faber | 3:23 |
| 2. | "Applause" | PA-NON | fu_mou | y0c1e, fu_mou | 4:52 |
| 3. | "aventure bleu" (Instrumental) | | | | 3:23 |
| 4. | "Applause" (Instrumental) | | | | 4:50 |
| Total length: | | | | | 16:28 |

DVD (Limited Edition only)
| No. | Title | Length |
|---|---|---|
| 1. | "aventure bleu" (MUSIC VIDEO) |
| 2. | "aventure bleu" (OFF SHOT) |
| 3. | "aventure bleu" (MAKING) |

== Charts ==
| Chart (2018) | Peak position |
|---|---|
| Oricon Weekly Singles Chart | 14 |
| Billboard JAPAN Hot 100 | 27 |
| Billboard JAPAN Hot Animation | 7 |
| Billboard JAPAN Top Singles Sales | 14 |

== Event ==
- 『 Maaya Party！7』 Maaya Uchida 7th Single Release Event「Maaya Party！7」（February 24, 2018 - March 11, 2018：Tokyo, Aichi, Osaka）

== Album ==
| Song | Album | Release date | Note |
|---|---|---|---|
| aventure bleu | 『Magic Hour』 | April 25, 2018 | 2nd Album |
