= C.o.s.m.o.s =

"c.o.s.m.o.s"

Single by Maaya Uchida

from the album Magic Hour
- B-side: "Symbolic View"
- Released: October 25, 2017
- Genre: J-POP
- Length: 4:35
- Label: Pony Canyon
- Songwriter: Shou Watanabe
- Producer: Akihiro Tomita

Maaya Uchida singles chronology
| "+INTERSECT+" (2017) | "c.o.s.m.o.s" (2017) | "aventure bleu" (2018) |

Music video
- Maaya Uchida "c.o.s.m.o.s" Music Video on YouTube

"c.o.s.m.o.s" is Japanese voice actress and singer Maaya Uchida's 6th single, released on October 25, 2017.

== Track listings ==
CD
| No. | Title | Lyrics | Music | Arrangement | Length |
|---|---|---|---|---|---|
| 1. | "c.o.s.m.o.s" | Shou Watanabe | Shou Watanabe | Mito | 4:35 |
| 2. | "Symbolic View" (シンボリックビュー) | Shou Watanabe | Shou Watanabe | Shou Watanabe | 3:20 |
| 3. | "c.o.s.m.o.s" (Instrumental) | | | | 4:35 |
| 4. | "Symbolic View" (Instrumental) | | | | 3:19 |
| Total length: | | | | | 15:49 |

DVD (Limited Edition only)
| No. | Title | Length |
|---|---|---|
| 1. | "c.o.s.m.o.s" (MUSIC VIDEO) |
| 2. | "c.o.s.m.o.s" (OFF SHOT) |
| 3. | "c.o.s.m.o.s" (MAKING) |

== Charts ==
| Chart (2017) | Peak position |
|---|---|
| Oricon Weekly Singles Chart | 6 |
| Billboard JAPAN Hot 100 | 15 |
| Billboard JAPAN Hot Animation | 5 |
| Billboard JAPAN Top Singles Sales | 7 |

== Album ==
| Song | Album | Release date | Note |
|---|---|---|---|
| c.o.s.m.o.s | 『Magic Hour』 | April 25, 2018 | 2nd Album |
| Symbolic View | 『Magic Hour』 | April 25, 2018 | 2nd Album |
