= Karappo Capsule =

Single by Maaya Uchida

from the album PENKI
- B-side: "Life is like a sunny day"
- Released: April 1, 2015
- Genre: J-POP
- Length: 4:39
- Label: Pony Canyon
- Songwriters: Shou Watanabe; Katsuhiko Kurosu
- Producer: Akihiro Tomita

Maaya Uchida singles chronology
"Gimme! Revolution" (2014)	"Karappo Capsule" (2015)	"Resonant Heart" (2016)

Music video
- Maaya Uchida "Karappo Capsule" Music Video on YouTube

"Karappo Capsule" (からっぽカプセル, lit. Empty Capsule) is Japanese voice actress and singer Maaya Uchida's 3rd single, released on April 1, 2015. The titular song from the single was used as the ending theme for the anime Comical Psychosomatic Medicine.

== Track listings ==
CD
No.	Title	Lyrics	Music	Arrangement	Length
1.	"Karappo Capsule" (からっぽカプセル)	Shou Watanabe	Shou Watanabe	Katsuhiko Kurosu	4:39
2.	"Life is like a sunny day"	Saori Kodama	y0c1e	Katsuhiko Kurosu	3:50
3.	"Karappo Capsule" (Instrumental)				4:39
4.	"Life is like a sunny day" (Instrumental)				3:48
Total length:					16:58

DVD (Limited Edition only)
No.	Title	Length
1.	"Karappo Capsule" (MUSIC VIDEO)
2.	"Karappo Capsule" (MAKING)
3.	"Karappo Capsule" (OFF SHOT)

== Charts ==
Chart (2015)	Peak position
Oricon Weekly Singles Chart	14
Billboard JAPAN Hot 100	31
Billboard JAPAN Hot Animation	4
Billboard JAPAN Top Singles Sales	11

== Event ==
- 『 Maaya Party！Vol.3』 Maaya Uchida 3rd Single Release Event「Maaya Party！Vol.3」（April 11, 2015 - April 18, 2015：Tokyo, Aichi, Osaka）

== Album ==
Song	Album	Release date	Note
Karappo Capsule	『PENKI』	December 2, 2015	1st Album
