= Hatsune Miku: Project Diva (video game) =

2009 video game

Hatsune Miku: Project DIVA
- Developers: Sega; Crypton Future Media; Dingo
- Publishers: Sega; Dwango Music Entertainment
- Series: Hatsune Miku: Project DIVA
- Engine: Alchemy
- Platforms: PlayStation Portable; PlayStation 3 (Dreamy Theater)
- Release: JP: July 2, 2009
- Genre: Rhythm game
- Mode: Single-player

Hatsune Miku: Project DIVA (初音ミク -Project DIVA-) is a 2009 rhythm game created by Sega and Crypton Future Media for the PlayStation Portable (PSP). The game was first released on July 2, 2009 in Japan with no international release. The game primarily makes use of Vocaloids, a series of singing synthesizer software, and the songs created using these Vocaloids, most notably Hatsune Miku. The game is the first video game to utilize the Vocaloid software developed by the Yamaha Corporation.

In addition, Sega has released Hatsune Miku: Project DIVA Dreamy Theater, a downloadable game on the PlayStation Network (PSN) for the PlayStation 3 (PS3). It allows players to play Project DIVA on the PS3 with updated visuals, requiring a PSP or PlayStation Vita with a copy of the original game to be plugged into the PS3 via a USB cable.

== Gameplay ==
As the first installment in the series, Project DIVA has a gameplay similar to that of the rest of the series, albeit without some of the current features in the series. The game features three difficulty modes: Easy, Medium, and Hard, as opposed to the four difficulty modes of the series forgoing the Extreme difficulty, which was only added in the sequel, Hatsune Miku: Project DIVA 2nd.

== Song list ==
There are a total of 77 songs available in Hatsune Miku: Project DIVA. 36 songs are obtained normally by playing through the game, 14 songs are only available through Edit Mode, and 27 songs need to be purchased from the PlayStation Network (PSN).

Song List
Song Title	Performed by	Producer
World is Mine (ワールドイズマイン, Wārudo Izu Main)	Hatsune Miku	ryo
The Rebel (ひねくれ者, Hinekure Mono)	Hatsune Miku	ryo
Love Is War (恋は戦争, Koi wa Sensō)	Hatsune Miku	ryo
That One Second Slow Motion (その一秒スローモーション, So no Ichibyō Surō Mōshon)	Hatsune Miku	ryo
Melt (メルト, Meruto)	Hatsune Miku	ryo
Far Away	Hatsune Miku	kz
Strobo Nights (ストロボナイツ, Sutorobo Naitsu)	Hatsune Miku	kz
Star Story	Hatsune Miku	kz
Last Night, Good Night	Hatsune Miku	kz
packaged	Hatsune Miku	kz
Sweet*Drops After the Rain (雨のちSweet*Drops, Ame Nochi Suīto*Doroppusu)	Hatsune Miku	OSTER Project
Miracle Paint (ミラクルペイント, Mirakuru Peinto)	Hatsune Miku	OSTER Project
Bad Mood Waltz (フキゲンワルツ, Fukigen Warutsu)	Hatsune Miku	OSTER Project
Marginal (マージナル, Mājinaru)	Hatsune Miku	OSTER Project
Dreaming Leaf -Dreaming Words- (Dreaming Leaf -ユメミルコトノハ-, Dorīmin Rīfu -Yume Miru Kotonoha-)	Hatsune Miku	OSTER Project
Song of Wastelands, Forests, and Magic (荒野と森と魔法の歌, Kōya to Mori to Mahō no Uta)	Hatsune Miku	Travolta-P
Song of Wastelands, Forests, and Magic (Len Version) (荒野と森と魔法の歌 (レンVer.), Kōya to Mori to Mahō no Uta (Ren Bājon))	Kagamine Len	Travolta-P
Song of Wastelands, Forests, and Magic (Rin Version) (荒野と森と魔法の歌(リンVer.), Kōya to Mori to Mahō no Uta (Rin Bājon))	Kagamine Rin	Travolta-P
White Dove (ハト, Hato)	Hatsune Miku	Hadano-P
moon	Hatsune Miku	iroha(sasaki)
Beware of Miku Miku Bacteria♪ (みくみく菌にご注意♪, Miku Miku Kin ni Gochūi♪)	Hatsune Miku	Hayaya-P
Song of Life (いのちの歌, Inochi no Uta)	Hatsune Miku	Travolta-P
Song of Life (Len Version) (いのちの歌(レンVer.), Inochi no Uta (Ren Bājon))	Kagamine Len	Travolta-P
Song of Life (Rin Version) (いのちの歌(リンVer.), Inochi no Uta (Rin Bājon))	Kagamine Rin	Travolta-P
The secret garden	Hatsune Miku	Otomania, Kosaki Satoru
Dear cocoa girls	Hatsune Miku	Deadball-P, Kosaki Satoru
Velvet Arabesque (天鵞絨アラベスク, Birōdo Arabesuku)	Hatsune Miku	Yasuo-P, Namiki Koichi
Updating Your Love List? (ラブリスト更新中？, Rabu Risuto Kōshin Chū?)	Hatsune Miku	Otomania, Namiki Koichi
Rain of Cherry Blossoms -standard edit- (桜ノ雨 - standard edit -, Sakura no Ame -Sutandādo Editto-)	Hatsune Miku	halyosy
Loving VOC@LOID (恋スルVOC@LOID, Koi Suru Bōkaroido)	Hatsune Miku	OSTER Project
Ievan Polkka	Hatsune Miku	Otomania
Your Diva (あなたの歌姫, Anata no Utahime)	Hatsune Miku	azuma
Electric Angel (えれくとりっく・えんじぇぅ, Erekutorikku Enjeu)	Hatsune Miku	Yasuo-P
The Disappearance of Hatsune Miku (初音ミクの消失, Hatsune Miku no Shōshitsu)	Hatsune Miku	cosMo
Golden Holy Night Rotting into the Frost and Snow (Requiem for the Phantasma) (金の聖夜霜雪に朽ちて, Kogane no Seiya Sōsetsu ni Kuchite)	Hatsune Miku	Deadball-P
I'll Miku-Miku You♪ [For Reals] (みくみくにしてあげる♪【してやんよ】, Miku Miku ni Shite Ageru♪ (Shite Yan yo))	Hatsune Miku	ika
I'm Going to Do the Rin-Rin-Rin♪ (リンリンリンってしてくりん♪, Rin Rin Rintte Shite Kurin♪)	Kagamine Rin	Jevanni-P
Cool-[Len] Love Song (イケ恋歌, Ike Renka)	Kagamine Len	Lelele-P
Double Lariat (ダブルラリアット, Daburu Rariatto)	Megurine Luka	Agoaniki-P
Thousand Year Solo (千年の独奏歌, Sennen no Dokusōka)	KAITO	yanagi-P
Oblivion in my Heart (忘却心中, Bōkyaku Shinjū)	MEIKO	OPA
Soar	Hatsune Miku	minato
The Farthest Ends (サイハテ, Saihate)	Hatsune Miku	Kobayashi Onyx
SETSUNA	Hatsune Miku	SHIKI
Sunset Nostalgic -remix- (夕暮れノスタルジック -remix-, Yūgure Nosutarujikku -Rimikkusu-)	Hatsune Miku	guriplus
Love it -Radio Edit-	Hatsune Miku	Clean Tears
Can You Hear It... (キコエテイマスカ..., Kikoete Imasuka...)	Hatsune Miku	G@POPO
Shooting Star Prologue	Hatsune Miku	SOSOSO-P
Tell Me!! The Magical Lyrics (教えて！！魔法のLyric, Oshiete!! Mahō no Ririkku)	Hatsune Miku	Chom-P
starise	Hatsune Miku	Yodare-P
Though a Song is Formless (歌に形はないけれど, Uta ni Katachi wa Nai Keredo)	Hatsune Miku	doriko
celluloid	Hatsune Miku	baker, aether_eru
1/6 -d2 mix-	Hatsune Miku	Vocaliod-P
Two-Faced Lovers (裏表ラバーズ, Uraomote Rabāzu)	Hatsune Miku	wowaka
Two Breaths Walking (二息歩行, Nisoku Hokō)	Hatsune Miku	DECO*27
Puzzle (パズル, Pazuru)	Hatsune Miku	Kuwagata-P
SPiCA	Hatsune Miku	Toku-P
Alice -DIVA mix-	Hatsune Miku	Furukawa-P
*Hello, Planet. (I.M.PLSE-EDIT) (＊ハロー、プラネット。(I.M.PLSE-EDIT), *Harō, Puranetto. (Inparusu Editto))	Hatsune Miku	sasakure.UK
RINGxRINGxRING	Kagamine Rin	OSTER Project
Li-li-li-li, I like you, I love you (すすすす、すき、だあいすき, Susususu, Suki, Dāisuki)	Kagamine Rin	Jevanni-P
MobiRe:SenS@tion (C.A.LLME-EDIT) (モバイリ：センセーション (C.A.LLME-EDIT), Mobaeri:Sensēshon (Kōru Mī Editto))	Kagamine Rin	sasakure.UK
Self-Hatred (自己嫌悪, Jiko Ken'o)	Kagamine Rin	Ginsaku
Transmit	Kagamine Rin	Signal-P
Why Haven't You Called Me Yet? (レンラクマダー？, Renraku Madā?)	Kagamine Rin	Live-P
To Beyond a Duodecillion (那由他の彼方まで, Nayuta no Kanata Made)	Kagamine Len	Tsurishi-P
I'll Make You Crazy♪ (ぶっちぎりにしてあげる♪, Butchigiri ni Shite Ageru♪)	Kagamine Rin	Bucchigiri-P
Sandscraper -The Desert Line Express- (サンドスクレイパー -砂漠の特急線-, Sandosukureipā -Sabaku no Tokkyūsen-)	Kagamine Len	Mikusagi-P
RIP=RELEASE	Megurine Luka	minato
Palette	Megurine Luka	Yuyoyuppe
The Wanderlast (A.R.MAGE-EDIT)	Megurine Luka	sasakure.UK
Red Leaf (紅一葉, Akahitoha)	Megurine Luka	Kurousa-P
Princess Round Dance Songs (巡姫舞踊曲, Meguri Hime Buyō Kyoku)	Megurine Luka	No.D
filozofio	Megurine Luka	Pandolist-P
Luka Luka★Night Fever (ルカルカ★ナイトフィーバー, Ruka Ruka★Naito Fībā)	Megurine Luka	samfree
No Logic	Megurine Luka	JimmyThumb-P
Toeto (トエト, Toeto)	Megurine Luka	Travolta-P

- Songs with a grey background can only be played in Edit Mode.
- Songs with an orange background are DLC and must be purchased from the PlayStation Network.

== Notes ==
1.Unlocked by completing the Hatsune Miku version of this song twice on Normal difficulty, with a "Standard" or "Great" rating.

2.Unlocked by completing the Hatsune Miku version of this song three times on Normal difficulty, with a "Standard" or "Great" rating.

== DLC ==
Two sets of downloadable content were released for Hatsune Miku: Project DIVA. The first set features Hatsune Miku and the second set features Kagamines Len and Rin, and Megurine Luka.

DLC Set #1 - Miku Uta, Okawari

- 9 songs sung by Hatsune Miku
- High-quality polygon PVs of all the songs (can only be viewed)
- 'Hello Planet' Miku 8-bit minigame
- Special Miku theme for PSP XrossMediaBar menu

DLC set #2 - Motto Okawari, Rin, Len, Luka

- 18 songs sung by Kagamines Len and Rin, and Megurine Luka
- High-quality polygon PVs of all the songs (can only be viewed)
- 'Toeto' Luka minigame
- Special Len/Rin and Luka themes for PSP XMB menu

== Dreamy Theater ==
Hatsune Miku: Project DIVA Dreamy Theater is a downloadable game for the PlayStation 3 that enables the game to be played on the console, with the use of a PlayStation Portable (PSP), that was released on June 24, 2010. The game can be downloaded from the PlayStation Store and must be installed on both the PS3 and PSP to facilitate connectivity between the two devices. The game features exactly the same gameplay as the portable version but with upgraded graphics that are on par with an average PS3 game. The game however requires the PSP to be plugged into the PS3 at all times whilst playing the game.
