= Hatsune Miku: Project Diva 2nd =

2010 video game

Hatsune Miku: Project DIVA 2nd
- Developers: Sega; Crypton Future Media; Dingo
- Publisher: Sega
- Series: Hatsune Miku: Project DIVA
- Engine: Alchemy
- Platforms: PlayStation Portable; PlayStation 3 (Dreamy Theater 2nd)
- Release: JP: July 29, 2010
- Genre: Rhythm game
- Mode: Single-player

Hatsune Miku: Project DIVA 2nd (初音ミク -Project DIVA- 2nd) is a 2010 rhythm game created by Sega and Crypton Future Media for the PlayStation Portable. The game is a sequel to the 2009 video game, Hatsune Miku: Project DIVA, and was released on July 29, 2010 in Japan with no international release. Like the original the game primarily makes use of Vocaloids, a series of singing synthesizer software, and the songs created using these vocaloids most notably the virtual-diva Vocaloid Hatsune Miku.

== Gameplay ==
The game primarily uses the same gameplay mechanics from the original game albeit with several changes. Most notable of which is that the game now uses the D-pad (arrow buttons) and a "hold and release" function for the face buttons in addition to the normal gameplay. Similar to the symbols of the first game, the game now includes colored arrows for example a blue arrow pointing downwards, this indicates that the player has to press "down" on the D-Pad and the "Cross" face button at the same time. The game also add a fourth difficulty, Extreme, to songs that is more difficult than the hard difficulty in the first game. The game will also introduce duets, as compared to only having solo songs in the first game, thus allowing players to select two modules instead. This also carries on into the Edit Mode of the game allowing players to create PVs for duets with two modules in them.

== Song list ==
A total of 72 songs are available in the game; 52 songs (30 new and 22 old) are obtained normally by playing through the game, while 9 songs are only available through Edit Mode, and 11 songs are downloadable content available from the PlayStation Network.

Song List
Song name	Performed by	Producer
Ievan Polkka (tutorial and edit mode only)	Hatsune Miku	Otomania
Romeo and Cinderella (ロミオとシンデレラ, Romio to Shinderera)	Hatsune Miku	doriko
magnet	Hatsune Miku; Megurine Luka	minato
Love Words (愛言葉, Ai Kotoba)	Hatsune Miku	DECO*27
Sound (サウンド, Saundo)	Hatsune Miku	baker
Heart (ココロ, Kokoro)	Kagamine Rin	Travolta-P
packaged	Hatsune Miku	kz
Butterfly on Your Right Shoulder (右肩の蝶, Migikata no Chō)	Kagamine Len	Nori-P
Marginal (マージナル, Mājinaru)	Hatsune Miku	OSTER Project
The secret garden	Hatsune Miku	Kosaki Satoru
Just Be Friends	Megurine Luka	Dixie Flatline
Strobo Nights (ストロボナイツ, Sutorobo Naitsu)	Hatsune Miku	kz
Clover♣Club (クローバー♣クラブ, Kurōbā♣Kurabu)	Hatsune Miku	Yuuyu-P
from Y to Y	Hatsune Miku	JimmyThumb-P
Updating Your Love List? (ラブリスト更新中？, Rabu Risuto Kōshin Chū?)	Hatsune Miku	Namiki Koichi
Yellow	Hatsune Miku	kz
Song of Life (いのちの歌, Inochi no Uta)	Hatsune Miku	Travolta-P
Change Me	MEIKO	shu-t
Vegetable Juice (ぽっぴっぽー, Poppippō)	Hatsune Miku	Lamaze-P
Cantarella (カンタレラ, Kantarera)	KAITO; Hatsune Miku (guest)	Kurousa-P
When the First Love Ends (初めての恋が終わる時, Hajimete no Koi ga Owaru Toki)	Hatsune Miku	ryo
Song of Wastelands, Forests, and Magic (荒野と森と魔法の歌, Kōya to Mori to Mahō no Uta)	Hatsune Miku	Travolta-P
Dear cocoa girls	Hatsune Miku	Kosaki Satoru
Gigantic Girl (巨大少女, Kyodai Shōjo)	Hatsune Miku	40meterP
Dear	Hatsune Miku	19's Sound Factory
Gemini (ジェミニ, Jemini)	Kagamine Rin; Kagamine Len	Dixie Flatline
VOiCE -DIVA MIX-	Hatsune Miku	Lovely-P
World is Mine (ワールドイズマイン, Wārudo Izu Main)	Hatsune Miku	ryo
Miracle Paint (ミラクルペイント, Mirakuru Peinto)	Hatsune Miku	OSTER Project
moon	Hatsune Miku	iroha(sasaki)
Velvet Arabesque (天鵞絨アラベスク, Birōdo Arabesuku)	Hatsune Miku	Namiki Koichi
Innocence	Hatsune Miku	Kazu-P
Meltdown (炉心融解, Roshin Yūkai)	Kagamine Rin	iroha(sasaki)
I Understand the Truth (ほんとは分かってる, Honto wa Wakatteru)	Hatsune Miku	Funakoshi-P
Melt (メルト, Meruto)	Hatsune Miku	ryo
Love-colored Ward (恋色病棟, Koiiro Byōto)	Hatsune Miku	OSTER Project
Finder (DSLR remix‐re:edit) (ファインダー (DSLR remix‐re:edit, Faindā (Dī Esu Eru Āru Rimikkusu‐Ri:Editto)	Hatsune Miku	kz
Promise	Kagamine Rin; Hatsune Miku	samfree
Beware of Miku Miku Bacteria♪ (みくみく菌にご注意♪, Mikumiku-kin ni Gochuui♪)	Hatsune Miku	Hayaya-P
The First Sound (ハジメテノオト, Hajimete no Oto)	Hatsune Miku	malo
White Dove (ハト, Hato)	Hatsune Miku	Hadano-P
The Farthest Ends (サイハテ, Saihate)	Hatsune Miku	Kobayashi Onyx
Look this Way, Baby (こっち向いてBaby, Kotchi Muite Bebī)	Hatsune Miku	ryo
Colorful × Melody (カラフル×メロディ, Karafuru×Merodī)	Hatsune Miku; Kagamine Rin	Team MOER
Double Lariat (ダブルラリアット, Daburu Rariatto)	Megurine Luka	Agoaniki-P
I'll Miku-Miku You♪ [For Reals] (みくみくにしてあげる♪【してやんよ】, Miku Miku ni Shite Ageru♪ (Shite Yan yo))	Hatsune Miku	ika
The Singing Passion of Hatsune Miku (初音ミクの激唱, Hatsune Miku no Gekishō)	Hatsune Miku	cosMo
Endless Nightmare	Megurine Luka	EM
Cardioid	Hatsune Miku	DATEKEN
EXtend	Hatsune Miku	FB777
Hometown	MEIKO	SuzukazeP
Why? (なんで？, Nande?)	Kagamine Len	Rerulili
Hallo World	Kagamine Rin	duron777
I'm Crazy For You	Hatsune Miku	SABA.U1
The Cat-like You (猫なキミ, Neko na Kimi)	Hatsune Miku	774P
Soft at times, Dark at times (時にはsoftに、時にはdarkに, Toki ni wa Sofuto ni, Toki ni wa Dāku ni)	Hatsune Miku	NAV
The Disappearance of Hatsune Miku (初音ミクの消失, Hatsune Miku no Shōshitsu)	Hatsune Miku	cosMo
StargazeR	Hatsune Miku	Kotsuban-P
GO MY WAY!!	Hatsune Miku	Otomania
relations	Kagamine Rin; Megurine Luka	Haro-P
Golden Holy Night Rotting into the Frost and Snow (Requiem for the Phantasma) (金の聖夜霜雪に朽ちて, Kogane no Seiya Sōsetsu ni Kuchite)	Hatsune Miku	Deadball-P
Butterfly on Your Right Shoulder -39's Giving Day Edition- (右肩の蝶 -39's Giving Day Edition-, Migikata no Chō -Sankusu Gibingu Dē Edishon-)	Kagamine Len; Kagamine Rin	Nori-P
Your Diva (あなたの歌姫, Anata no Utahime)	Hatsune Miku	azuma
Stardust Utopia (星屑ユートピア, Hoshikuzu Yūtopia)	Megurine Luka	Otetsu
Electric Angel (えれくとりっく・えんじぇぅ, Erekutorikku Enjeu)	Hatsune Miku	Yasuo-P
Time Limit (タイムリミット, Taimu Rimitto)	Hatsune Miku	Tatami-P

- Songs with a light blue background are returning songs from Hatsune Miku: Project DIVA.
- Songs with a grey background can only be played in Edit Mode.
- Songs with an orange background are DLC which returned as playable songs in Hatsune Miku: Project DIVA Extend.
- Songs with a yellow background are DLC which are only available in the game.

== DLC ==
Various packs of DLC were released for the game, including new modules, new rooms, new room items, and new songs and stages:

- July 29, 2010 - The first DLC pack was released, containing two additional posters for room decoration.
- August 26, 2010 - In observance of Hatsune Miku's 3rd birthday, a themed DLC pack was released, containing a themed room, two additional room items, and a poster room decoration.
- August 31, 2010 - A new module, taken from the cover of the Hatsune Miku Append Vocaloid software, was released.
- September 30, 2010 - The songs "The Disappearance of Hatsune Miku" and "StargazeR" were released.
- October 28, 2010 - The "Hatsune Miku: Project DIVA 2nd x THE iDOLM@STER SP Collaboration" DLC packs were released, containing modules from THE iDOLM@STER SP for Miku, Rin, and Luka, Vocaloid versions of the franchise songs "GO MY WAY!!" and "relations", a 765 Production room and item, an THE iDOLM@STER character doll, and new room posters.
- November 4, 2010 - In observance of MEIKO's 6th birthday, a themed DLC pack was released, including a themed room, a birthday cake room item, an "i Cup" room item, and a kimono module.
- November 30, 2010 - Christmas modules for each character were released.
- December 22, 2010 - A Christmas/Kagamine Rin and Len themed pack was released, containing a variety of Christmas themed items and room, a room poster and room item, the "-39's Giving Day Edition-" version of the song "Butterfly on Your Right Shoulder". The songs "Your Diva" and "Requiem for the Phantasma" were also released.
- January 27, 2011 - In observance of Megurine Luka's 2nd birthday, a themed DLC pack was released, including a themed room, a birthday cake room item, a doll room item, a room poster and the song "Stardust Utopia". A winter-themed Miku module was also released.
- February 17, 2011 - In observance of KAITO's 5th birthday, a themed DLC pack was released, including an ice-cream themed room and room decoration, a "Happy Birthday" ice cream cone room decoration, a poster, and a white suit module. The songs "Electric Angel" and "Time Limit" were also released.

== Dreamy Theater 2nd ==
Similar to Hatsune Miku: Project DIVA, a companion game for the PlayStation 3, Hatsune Miku: Project DIVA Dreamy Theater 2nd, was released digitally via the Japanese PlayStation Store on August 4, 2011. Like its predecessor, the game features updated high-definition visual improvements over its respective PSP game while featuring the same content and PlayStation Trophies support, and requires the player to connect the PSP (with Project DIVA 2nd) to the PS3 via USB to access the content in the game. Notable differences from the first game are that the player need only connect their PSP system once to transfer a save file rather than having it constantly connected via USB cable, as well as the addition of stereoscopic 3D for compatible TVs. Once the game has been unlocked by transferring a save file, all unlocked content from the player's PSP system will be available to play along with the songs from the first game as an added bonus.

== Hatsune Miku: Project Diva Extend ==
Hatsune Miku: Project DIVA Extend
- Developers: Sega; Crypton Future Media; Dingo
- Publishers: Sega; Dwango Music Entertainment
- Series: Hatsune Miku: Project DIVA
- Engine: Alchemy
- Platforms: PlayStation Portable; PlayStation 3 (Dreamy Theater Extend)
- Release: JP: November 10, 2011
- Genre: Rhythm game
- Mode: Single-player

Hatsune Miku: Project DIVA Extend (初音ミク -Project DIVA- extend) is a 2011 rhythm game created as an expansion to Project DIVA 2nd by Sega and Crypton Future Media for the PlayStation Portable. It was released on November 10, 2011 in Japan with no international release. Like the original, the game primarily makes use of Vocaloids. Rock band Gacharic Spin served as motion capture models. One of Miku's outfits is based on the Fei-Yen mecha from Virtual On, and this model would later be adapted into a real-life toy.

There are a total of 50 songs available in Hatsune Miku: Project DIVA Extend; 45 songs (14 new and 31 old) are obtained normally by playing through the game, and 5 songs are only available through Edit Mode.

Song List
Song Name	Performed By	Producer
Ievan Polkka (tutorial and edit mode only)	Hatsune Miku	Otomania
Cat Ears Switch (ねこみみスイッチ, Nekomimi Suitchi)	Hatsune Miku	daniwellP
End of Solitude (孤独の果て, Kodoku no Hate)	Kagamine Rin; Kagamine Len	Hikari Shuuyou
Palette	Megurine Luka	Yuyoyuppe
SPiCa -39's Giving Day Edition- (Note: This song is based on Miku no Hi Kanshasai 39's Giving Day (ミクの日感謝祭 39's Giving Day) at Zepp Tokyo, held on March 9, 2010.)	Hatsune Miku	Toku-P
Starduster	Hatsune Miku	JimmyThumb-P
To Beyond a Duodecillion (那由他の彼方まで, Nayuta no Kanata Made)	Kagamine Len	Tsurishi-P
Stardust Utopia (星屑ユートピア, Hoshikuzu Yūtopia)	Megurine Luka	Otetsu
Time Limit (タイムリミット, Taimu Rimitto)	Hatsune Miku	Tatami-P
Though A Song Is Formless (歌に形はないけれど, Uta ni Katachi wa Nai Keredo)	Hatsune Miku	doriko
Meltdown (炉心融解, Roshin Yūkai)	Kagamine Rin	iroha(sasaki)
Electric Angel (えれくとりっく・えんじぇぅ, Erekutorikku Enjeu)	Hatsune Miku	Yasuo-P
Yellow	Hatsune Miku	kz
Thousand-Year Solo (DIVA edit) (千年の独奏歌 (DIVA edit), Sennen no Dokusōka (DIVA edit))	KAITO	Yanagi-P
Butterfly on Your Right Shoulder -39s Giving Day Edition- (右肩の蝶 -39's Giving Day Edition-, Migikata no Chō -39's Giving Day Edition-)	Kagamine Len	Nori-P
Your Diva (あなたの歌姫, Anata no Utahime)	Hatsune Miku	azuma
Puzzle (パズル, Pazuru)	Hatsune Miku	Kuwagata-P
Oblivion in my Heart (忘却心中, Bōkyaku Shinjū)	MEIKO	OPA
Rin Rin Signal -Append Mix- (リンリンシグナル -Append Mix-, Rin Rin Shigunaru -Append Mix-)	Kagamine Rin; Kagamine Len	Signal-P
Just Be Friends	Megurine Luka	Dixie Flatline
melody...	Hatsune Miku	Mikuru396
Pair of Wintry Winds (番凩, Tsugai Kogarashi)	KAITO; MEIKO	sigotositeP
Colorful × Melody (カラフル×メロディ, Karafuru x Merodi)	Hatsune Miku; Kagamine Rin	Team MOER
Luka Luka★Night Fever (ルカルカ★ナイトフィーバー, Ruka Ruka★Naito Fībā)	Megurine Luka	samfree
StargazeR	Hatsune Miku	Kotsuban-P
Golden Holy Night Rotting into the Frost and Snow (Requiem for the Phantasma) (金の聖夜霜雪に朽ちて, Kogane no Seiya Sōsetsu ni Kuchite)	Hatsune Miku	Deadball-P
Iroha Song (いろは唄, Iroha Uta)	Kagamine Rin	Ginsaku
*Hello, Planet. (I.M.PLSE-EDIT) (＊ハロー、プラネット。(I.M.PLSE-EDIT), *Harō, Puranetto. (I.M.PLSE-EDIT))	Hatsune Miku	sasakure.UK
Close and Open, Demons and the Dead (結んで開いて羅刹と骸, Musunde Hiraite Rasetsu to Mukuro)	Hatsune Miku	Hachi
The Disappearance of Hatsune Miku (初音ミクの消失, Hatsune Miku no Shōshitsu)	Hatsune Miku	cosMo
Paradichlorobenzene (パラジクロロベンゼン, Parajikurorobenzen)	Kagamine Len	Owata-P
Two-Faced Lovers (裏表ラバーズ, Ura-Omote Rabāzu)	Hatsune Miku	wowaka
Look this Way, Baby (こっち向いて Baby, Kotchi Muite Bebī)	Hatsune Miku	ryo
The Singing Passion of Hatsune Miku (初音ミクの激唱, Hatsune Miku no Gekishō)	Hatsune Miku	cosMo
Colorful × Sexy (カラフル×セクシィ, Karafuru×Sekushī)	Megurine Luka; MEIKO	Team MOER
Rolling Girl (ローリンガール, Rōrin Gāru)	Hatsune Miku	wowaka
Cumulonimbus Cloud Graffiti (積乱雲グラフィティ, Sekiran'un Gurafiti)	Hatsune Miku	ryo
Start of Rainbow ~first step~	Hatsune Miku	Sugiyama Keiichi/Dixie Flatline
The Date of Indigo, fly sky ~second flight~ (藍色の日、空翔ける ~second flight~, Aiiro no Hi, Sora Kakeru ~second flight~)	Hatsune Miku	Sugiyama Keiichi/baker
Prayer of Love ~extend your wave~ (恋の祈り ~extend your wave~, Koi no Inori ~extend your wave~)	Hatsune Miku	Sugiyama Keiichi/YUMIKO/wowaka

- Songs with a light blue background are returning songs with charts ported over from Hatsune Miku: Project DIVA 2nd.
- Songs with a gray background can only be played in Diva Room and Edit Mode.

=== Dreamy Theater Extend ===
Similar to Project DIVA and Project DIVA 2nd, a companion game for the PlayStation 3, Hatsune Miku: Project DIVA Dreamy Theater Extend, was released digitally via the Japanese PlayStation Store on September 13, 2012. Like its predecessors, the game features updated high-definition visual improvements over its respective PSP game while featuring the same content and PlayStation Trophies support, and requires the player to connect the PSP (with Project DIVA Extend) to the PS3 via USB to access the content in the game. In addition, the game also supports stereoscopic 3D.

=== Live Concert Mode song list ===
Dreamy Theater Extend features a new mode called Live Concert Mode, which allows players to watch music videos of eleven songs being performed at a virtual reconstruction of the stage of Tokyo Dome City Hall, where the Hatsune Miku Concert: Saigo no Miku no Hi Kanshasai Final (発音ミクコンサート 最後のミクの日感謝祭 ファイナル) concert was held at in real-life on March 9, 2012, as the second part of Miku no Hi Dai Kanshasai (ミクの日大感謝祭); in addition, the characters also perform exactly as they did in the concert. While watching a video, the camera can be controlled to change viewing angles by using the analogue sticks and shoulder buttons.

Song List
Song Name	Performed By	Producer
Electric Angel (えれくとりっく・えんじぇぅ, Erekutorikku Enjeu)	Hatsune Miku	Yasuo-P
Meltdown (炉心融解, Roshin Yūkai)	Kagamine Rin	iroha(sasaki)
StargazeR	Hatsune Miku	Kotsuban-P
End of Solitude (孤独の果て, Kodoku no Hate)	Kagamine Rin; Kagamine Len	Hikari Shuuyou
The Disappearance of Hatsune Miku (初音ミクの消失, Hatsune Miku no Shōshitsu)	Hatsune Miku	cosMo
Time Limit (タイムリミット, Taimu Rimitto)	Hatsune Miku	Tatami-P
Butterfly on Your Right Shoulder (右肩の蝶, Migikata no Chō)	Kagamine Len; Kagamine Rin	Nori-P
Puzzle (パズル, Pazuru)	Hatsune Miku	Kuwagata-P
Just Be Friends	Megurine Luka	Dixie Flatline
SPiCa	Hatsune Miku	Toku-P
World's End Dancehall (ワールズエンド・ダンスホール, Wāruzu Endo Dansuhōru)	Hatsune Miku; Megurine Luka	wowaka
