= Penki, Perm Krai =

Penki Пеньки
- Village
- Location within Perm Krai Location within Russia
- Coordinates: 58°19′N 56°25′E
- Country: Russia
- Region: Perm Krai
- District: Dobryansky District
- Time zone: UTC+5:00

Penki (Russian: Пеньки) is a rural locality (a village) in Dobryansky District, Perm Krai, Russia. The population was 29 as of 2010. There are 4 streets.

== Geography ==
Penki is located 34 km south of Dobryanka (the district's administrative centre) by road. Lazarevsky is the nearest rural locality.
