= Penki, Vladimir Oblast =

Penki Пеньки
- Village
- Location within Vladimir Oblast Location within Russia
- Coordinates: 55°58′N 40°44′E
- Country: Russia
- Region: Vladimir Oblast
- District: Sudogodsky District
- Time zone: UTC+3:00

Penki (Russian: Пеньки) is a rural locality (a village) in Golovinskoye Rural Settlement, Sudogodsky District, Vladimir Oblast, Russia. The population was 15 as of 2010.

== Geography ==
Penki is located on the Soyma River, 9 km northwest of Sudogda (the district's administrative centre) by road. Soyma is the nearest rural locality.
