= Samfree =

samfree 佐野貴幸
- Also known as: samfree, SAM
- Born: Takayuki Sano; September 9, 1984; Niigata, Niigata, Japan
- Died: September 24, 2015 (aged 31)
- Genres: EDM, techno, rock, Eurobeat
- Occupations: Musical composer, arranger
- Years active: 2007–2015
- Website: nationone.jp

Takayuki Sano (佐野貴幸, Sano Takayuki; September 9, 1984 – September 24, 2015), more commonly known as samfree or SAM, was a Japanese music producer heavily involved in composing and arranging songs using Vocaloid software. He was also notably involved in producing theme songs for various anime television series.

== Biography ==
Samfree first came into prominence releasing various Vocaloid-based music online; his song Luka Luka Night Fever, released on Nico Nico Douga in February 2009, quickly became popular on the website and remains one of his most notable works today. Having written both the music composition and lyrics for the song, samfree utilised the voice of Megurine Luka using the Vocaloid software to create the vocals. Within the span of a year, the original song received over 1.7 million views on Nico Nico Douga. The song would later on form part of samfree's "Night Series" of Vocaloid music tracks. The song was also featured at Miku Expo 2014.

Following a series of agreements with various studios, samfree composed and arranged character songs, opening and closing theme songs for anime series such as Wish Upon the Pleiades, Mushibugyo, Good Luck Girl!, Tegami Bachi: Reverse and Katanagatari. His sixth album, titled Fever, was released in September 2011. In 2012, samfree composed promotional music for convenience store chain Lawson. In addition, his music tracks have been featured in video games such as the Hatsune Miku: Project DIVA series. Samfree made live performances during various Vocaloid concert events, including 39's Giving Day Live Concert in 2010 and 2012.

Samfree died on September 24, 2015, at the age of 31; while the precise cause of death has not been publicly revealed, an announcement made by his family stated that it was a "sudden death that was not due to external causes".

== Discography ==
=== Original releases ===
#	Title	Release date	Notes
1st	Daybreak	March 23, 2008	Twelve-track album.
2nd	Missing	August 16, 2008	Ten-track album first distributed at Comiket 74.
3rd	Akaimihajiketa/emorabu (赤い実はじけた/えもラブ)	November 30, 2008	Special event CD for THE VOC@LOiD M@STER6.
4th	Story	September 6, 2009	Ten-track album.
5th	Crime	August 14, 2010	Twelve-track album first distributed at Comiket 78.
6th	Fever	September 4, 2011	Fifteen-track album.

=== Singles ===
Year	Title
2007	"tender wind"
2007	"daybreak"
2007	"CHAIN"
2008	"promise"
2008	"Powder Snow"
2008	"missing"
2008	"HAPPY SUNDAY"
2009	"Bye-Bye Lover"
2009	"Luka Luka★Night Fever"
2009	"Tako Luka★ Maguro Fever"
2009	Megu Megu☆ Fire Endless Night
2009	"Rainbow"
2009	"Bye-Bye"
2009	"Gravity=Reality"
2009	"Prism Heart"
2009	"Miki Miki Romantic Night"
2010	"Lily Lily ★ Burning Night"
2012	"IA IA ★ Night of Desire"
2012	"Teto Teto ★ in the wonder Night"
2013	"Zola Miku ★ Eccentric Future Night"
2014	"Yuka Yuka ☆ Heavenly night"
2015	"Mind Voice"

=== Collaboration works ===
Album artist/record label	Title	Release date	Notes
Exit Tunes	Exit Tunes Presents Stardom 2	August 19, 2009	Vocaloid compilation album.
Heartfull Entertainment	SAM Project vol.1	May 4, 2010	Anime theme song remix album.
A-One	Toho Eurobeat Vol.1	August 14, 2010	Touhou Project Eurobeat arrangement album released at Comiket 78.
Poyahchio	Cheerful 77degree rise (ゴキゲン77°↑)	August 14, 2010	Vocal album by Nanahira, released at Comiket 78.
Chroma of Wall	Plustellia	August 15, 2010	Vocaloid electronica album released at Comiket 78.
Celo Project	Trasognata	November 14, 2010	Vocaloid compilation album.
Innocent Key	Koko Boku MUSIC PARTY (ココボクMUSICPARTY)	December 30, 2010	Original vocal album released at Comiket 79.
A-One	Toho Eurobeat Vol.2	December 30, 2010	Touhou Project eurobeat arrangement album released at Comiket 79.
A-One	Toho Eurobeat Vol.3	March 13, 2011	Touhou Project eurobeat arrangement album released at Reitaisai 8.
Dwango/Sony Music	VOCALOID BEST from Nico Nico Douga (Red) (VOCALOID BEST from ニコニコ動画(あか))	June 22, 2011	Compilation album of Vocaloid tracks from Nico Nico Douga, created by Sony Music.
Innocent Key	TOUHOU∀KB (東方∀ＫＢ)	August 13, 2011	Touhou Project arrangement album released at Comiket 80.
A-One	Toho Eurobeat Vol.4	August 13, 2011	Touhou Project eurobeat arrangement album released at Comiket 80.
Yamaha	THE VOCALOID produced by Yamaha	September 14, 2011	Vocaloid compilation album.
5pb.	Science Adventure Dance Remix	September 21, 2011	Remix album for Chaos;Head and Steins;Gate published by 5pb. Records and commercially distributed by Media Factory.
Sony Music	Hatsune Miku Project DIVA extend Complete Collection (初音ミク Project DIVA extend Complete Collection)	November 9, 2011	Original soundtrack for the game Hatsune Miku: Project DIVA Extend.
A-One	The Best Of Non-Stop Toho Eurobeat 2011	December 30, 2011	Touhou Project eurobeat arrangement album released at Comiket 81.
Innocent Key	Touhou Yaminabe (東方闇鍋)	December 30, 2011	Touhou Project arrangement album released at Comiket 81.
EMI Music Japan	VOCALODANCE	February 29, 2012	Vocaloid compilation album.
Avex Trax	SEB presents SUPER HATSUNE BEAT vol.1	March 14, 2012	Vocaloid eurobeat album, part of the Super Eurobeat compilation by Avex Entertainment.
A-One	Super Euro Smash Vol.1	April 28, 2012	Eurobeat compilation album.
EMI Music Japan	Vocalo Super Mix feat. Hatsune Miku (ボカロ超ミックス feat. 初音ミク)	September 26, 2012	Vocaloid compilation album.
Poyahchio	Petit Rhythm 7 (プチリズム７♭)	October 27, 2013	Collaborative vocal album released at M3-32, performed by Nanahira.
Confetto	Love Chu! (らぶちゅ！)	April 27, 2014	Collaborative vocal album released at M3-33.

=== Other releases ===
==== Anime television series ====
Record label	Vocals	Title	Series	Release date	Notes
Ki/oon Music	Piko	Wasurenagusa (勿忘草)	Tegami Bachi: Reverse	December 8, 2010	First ending theme song. Composition and arrangement by samfree.
Ki/oon Music	Piko	Sakurane (桜音)	Yorinuki Gintama-san	March 9, 2011	Ending theme vocal single. Composition and arrangement by samfree.
Ki/oon Music	Piko	Make my day!	Good Luck Girl!	August 15, 2012	Opening theme vocal single. Composition and arrangement by samfree.
Ki/oon Music	Piko	Kotonoha (言ノ葉)	Katanagatari	June 5, 2013	Ending theme vocal single. Composition, arrangement and lyrics by samfree.
Avex Trax	FREEDOM (FREE蛇'M)	Denshin Unchained (伝心∞アンチェインド)	Mushibugyo	September 4, 2013	Opening theme vocal single. Composition, arrangement and lyrics by samfree.
Warner Bros.	Sachika Misawa	Links	Toaru Kagaku no Railgun S	August 21, 2013	B-side track "Relievers" composed and arranged by samfree.
Warner Bros.	Kano (鹿乃)	Stella-rium	Wish Upon the Pleiades	May 20, 2015	Opening theme vocal single. Music arrangement by samfree.

==== Video games ====
Game	Tracks
Dance Evolution	Luka Luka Night Fever; Gravity=Reality; Megumegu Fire Endless Night
Hatsune Miku: Project DIVA series: Hatsune Miku: Project DIVA; Hatsune Miku: Project DIVA 2nd; Hatsune Miku: Project DIVA Extend; Hatsune Miku: Project DIVA Arcade; Hatsune Miku: Project DIVA F 2nd; Hatsune Miku: Project Diva Future Tone	Promise; Luka Luka Night Fever
Hatsune Miku: Colorful Stage!	Luka Luka Night Fever
Miku Flick/02	Promise; Luka Luka Night Fever
Reflec Beat Colette	Luka Luka Night Fever
Megpoid the Music#	Megumegu Fire Endless Night
Taiko No Tatsujin series: Taiko No Tatsujin Wii U 3: Atsumete Tomodachi Daisakusen; Taiko no Tatsujin White Version; Taiko no Tatsujin Red Version; Taiko no Tatsujin Blue Version; Taiko no Tatsujin Yellow Version; Taiko no Tatsujin Green Version; Taiko no Tatsujin Murasaki Version; Taiko no Tatsujin (March 2020 Version)	Luka Luka Night Fever
