= Unison Square Garden =

Japanese pop rock band

- Origin: Japan
- Genres: Rock
- Years active: 2004–present (on Hiatus Since 2026)
- Label: Toy's Factory
- Member of: Kosuke Saito; Tomoya Tabuchi; Takao Suzuki
- Website: unison-s-g.com

Unison Square Garden (stylized as UNISON SQUARE GARDEN, or USG) is a Japanese Rock band signed to Toy's Factory. The band includes Kosuke Saito (vocals/guitar), Tomoya Tabuchi (bass/backing vocals), and Takao Suzuki (drums/backing vocals).

== Career ==
In July 2004, the band formed under the name "Unison" (ユニゾン) and later renamed the band name to "Unison Square Garden". They took part in Teens 'Music Festival Musical Instrument Store Competition, and won the Grand Prix. On July 23rd, 2008, they made their major debut under Toy's Factory with their first single "Sentimental Period". In 2009, they released their first full album "Unison Square Garden", and went on tour. In February 2014, they gave their first televised performance on Music Station. In July 2015, they released the anniversary album "Dugout Accident", and held a "Unison Square Garden Live Special 'fun time 724'" at Nippon Budokan. In July 2019, they released a 15th anniversary coupling best album "Bee-Side Sea-Side: B-side Collection Album", and held a concert 『Program 15th』 at Maishima Sports Island. The band celebrated its 20th anniversary in July 2024, and on July 24th the concert "Unison Square Garden 20th Anniversary LIVE "Rock Band is fun"" was held at Nippon Budokan. On the same day, they released "Sub Machine, Best Machine".

On April 27th, 2026, it was announced by the band on their official website that drummer Takao Suzuki will leave the band, and the band would go on hiatus after their July 15 performance at Makuhari Messe titled UNISON SQUARE GARDEN LIVE 2026「Sentimental Period」.

== Discography ==
=== Studio albums ===
Release date	Title	Peak position
Release date	Title	JPN
April 15, 2009	Unison Square Garden	20
April 7, 2010	Jet Co.	24
July 6, 2011	Populus Populus	18
February 6, 2013	Cider Road	9
August 27, 2014	Catcher in the Spy	5
July 6, 2016	Dr. Izzy	3
January 24, 2018	Mode Mood Mode	2
September 30, 2020	Patrick Vegee	2
April 12, 2023	Ninth Peel	1

=== Mini albums ===
Release date	Title	Peak position
Release date	Title	JPN
January 16, 2008 Re-released: July 3, 2019	Shin Sekai Note (新世界ノート)	25
January 16, 2008 Re-released: July 3, 2019	Ryusei Zenya (流星前夜)	24

=== Anniversary albums ===
Release date	Title	Peak position
Release date	Title	JPN
July 22, 2015	Dugout Accident	2
July 3, 2019	Bee Side Sea Side: B-side Collection Album	5
July 24, 2024	Sub Machine, Best Machine	4

=== Compilation albums ===
Release date	Title
October 11, 2019	Unison Square Garden The 1st Collection for Streaming

=== Video albums ===
Release date	Title	Peak position	
Release date	Title	JPN DVD	JPN Blu-ray
February 6, 2013	UNISON SQUARE GARDEN ONEMAN TOUR 2012 SPECIAL ~Spring Spring Spring~ at ZEPP TOKYO 2012.04.21	9	—
November 6, 2013	UNISON SQUARE GARDEN TOUR 2013 CIDER ROAD TOUR at NHK HALL 2013.04.10	8	—
January 27, 2016	UNISON SQUARE GARDEN LIVE SPECIAL "fun time 724" at Nippon Budokan 2015.7.24	4	—
May 17, 2017	UNISON SQUARE GARDEN TOUR 2016 “Dr.Izzy” at Yokosuka Arts Theatre 2016.11.21	7	9
December 26, 2018	UNISON SQUARE GARDEN TOUR 2018 MODE MOOD MODE at Omiya Sonic City 2018.06.29	6	10
December 25, 2019	UNISON SQUARE GARDEN 15th Anniversary Live『Program 15th』 at Osaka Maishima 2019.07.27	9	6
June 24, 2020	UNISON SQUARE GARDEN「Bee-side Sea-side U-side」at Zepp Tokyo 2019.10.16	6	4
May 26, 2021	UNISON SQUARE GARDEN TOUR 2021「Normal」at KT Zepp Yokohama 2021.03.02	6	10
October 6, 2021	UNISON SQUARE GARDEN Revival Tour “Spring Spring Spring” at TOKYO GARDEN THEATER 2021.05.20	6	3
December 29, 2021	UNISON SQUARE GARDEN Revival Tour “CIDER ROAD” at TOKYO GARDEN THEATER 2021.08.24	16	8
July 6, 2022	UNISON SQUARE GARDEN TOUR 2021-2022『Patrick Vegee』at TOKYO GARDEN THEATER 2022.01.26	6	9
January 18, 2023	UNISON SQUARE GARDEN TOUR 2022『kaleido proud fiesta』at Fuchu no Mori Arts Theater 2022.09.20	8	7
October 25, 2023	UNISON SQUARE GARDEN TOUR 2023 “Ninth Peel” at TOKYO GARDEN THEATER 2023.07.01	6	7
March 26, 2025	UNISON SQUARE GARDEN 20th Anniversary LIVE "ROCK BAND is fun" 2024.07.24 / "Orchestra Wo Mini Ikou" 2024.07.25 at Nippon Budokan	5	3
July 2, 2025	UNISON SQUARE GARDEN TOUR 2024「20th BEST MACHINE」at Utsunomiya city Cultural Hall 2024.10.01		

=== Singles ===
Release date	Title	Peak position	Album
Release date	Title	JPN	Album
July 23, 2008	"Sentimental Period" (センチメンタルピリオド)	109	Unison Square Garden
January 28, 2009	"Master Volume" (マスターボリューム)	49	Unison Square Garden
February 10, 2010	Cody Beats	38	Jet Co.
November 24, 2010	"Scarsdale" (スカースデイル)	35	Populus Populus
May 11, 2011	"Orion o Nazoru" (オリオンをなぞる)	14	Populus Populus
July 25, 2012	"Ryusei-no Squall" (流星のスコール)	21	Cider Road
September 19, 2012	"Linear Blue o Kikinagara" (リニアブルーを聴きながら)	8	Cider Road
November 6, 2013	"Sakura no Ato (All Quartets Lead to The?)" (桜のあと (all quartets lead to the?))	10	Catcher in the Spy
February 5, 2014	"Harmonized Finale"	8	Catcher in the Spy
May 20, 2015	"Sugar Song and Bitter Step" (シュガーソングとビターステップ)	5	Dr. Izzy
August 9, 2017	"10% Roll, 10% Romance"	3	Mode Mood Mode
November 8, 2017	"Invisible Sensation"	5	Mode Mood Mode
November 15, 2017	"Fake Town Baby"	6	Mode Mood Mode
March 7, 2018	"Haru Ga Kite Bokura" (春が来てぼくら)	5	Patrick Vegee
November 7, 2018	"Catch Up, Latency"	3	Patrick Vegee
October 11, 2019	"Phantom Joke"	5	Patrick Vegee
April 13, 2022	"Kaleido Proud Fiesta"	4	Ninth Peel
October 19, 2022	"Chaos Ga Kiwamaru" (カオスが極まる)	7	Ninth Peel
September 27, 2023	"Ikenai Fool Logic" (いけないfool logic)	5	
October 2, 2024	"Bōjaku No Charisma" (傍若のカリスマ)	7	
January 21, 2026	"Uruwashi"/"Azalea no Kaze" (うるわし/アザレアの風)	5	
